= Cuisine of the Southern United States =

Regional cuisine of the United States

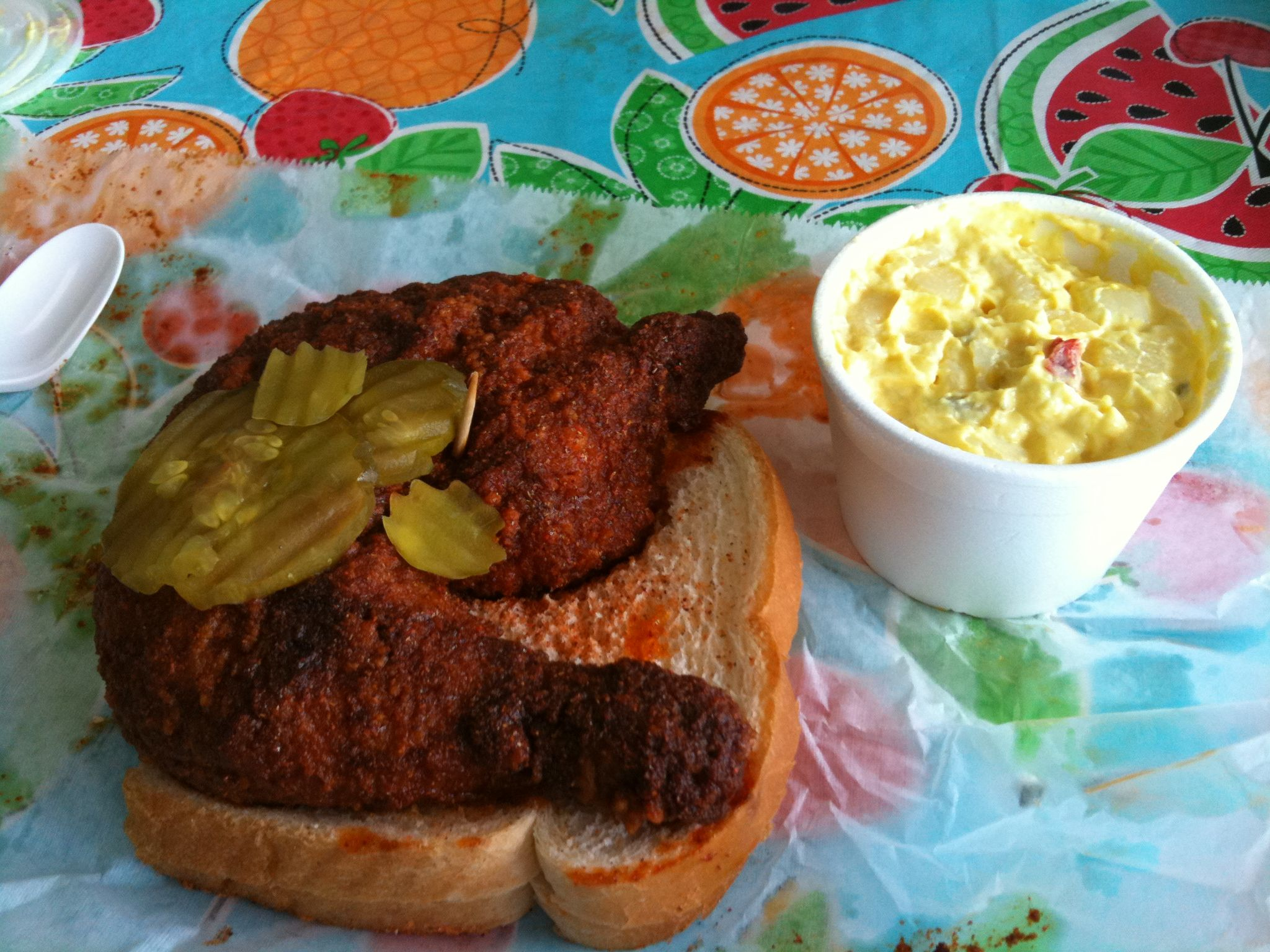
Prince's hot chicken, garnished with pickle slices and served on sliced bread with a side of potato salad. Hot chicken, referred to by The New York Times as "Nashville-Style" chicken, is the signature food of Nashville, Tennessee, and is a popular menu item in the city.

The cuisine of the Southern United States encompasses diverse food traditions of several subregions, including the cuisines of Southeastern Native American tribes, Tidewater, Appalachian, Ozarks, Lowcountry, Cajun, Creole, African American cuisine and Floribbean, Spanish, French, British, Ulster-Scots, German, Italian and Middle Eastern cuisine. Elements of Southern cuisine have spread to other parts of the United States, influencing other types of American cuisine.

Many elements of Southern cooking—tomatoes, squash, corn (and its derivatives, such as hominy and grits), and deep-pit barbecuing—are borrowings from Indigenous peoples of the region (e.g., Cherokee, Caddo, Choctaw, and Seminole). From the Old World, European colonists introduced sugar, flour, milk, eggs, and livestock, along with a number of vegetables; meanwhile, enslaved West Africans trafficked to the North American colonies through the Atlantic slave trade introduced black-eyed peas, okra, eggplant, sesame, sorghum, melons, and various spices. Rice also became prominent in many dishes in the Lowcountry region of South Carolina because the enslaved people who settled the region (now known as the Gullah people) were already familiar with the crop.

Many Southern foodways are local adaptations of Old World traditions. In Appalachia, many Southern dishes are of Scottish or English Border origin. For instance, the South's fondness for a full breakfast derives from the full breakfast or fry-up. Pork, once considered informally taboo in Scotland, has taken the place of lamb and mutton. Instead of chopped oats, Southerners have traditionally eaten grits, a porridge normally made from coarsely ground, nixtamalized maize, also known as hominy.

Certain regions have been infused with different Old World traditions. Louisiana Creole cuisine draws upon vernacular French cuisine, West African cuisine, and Spanish cuisine; Floribbean cuisine is Spanish-based with obvious Caribbean influences; and Tex-Mex has considerable Mexican and Indigenous influences with its abundant use of New World vegetables (such as corn, tomatoes, squash, and peppers) and barbecued meat. In southern Louisiana, West African influences have persisted in dishes such as gumbo, jambalaya, and red beans and rice. Native American and French Creole dishes also influence the food.

== History ==
=== Indigenous cuisine before colonization ===
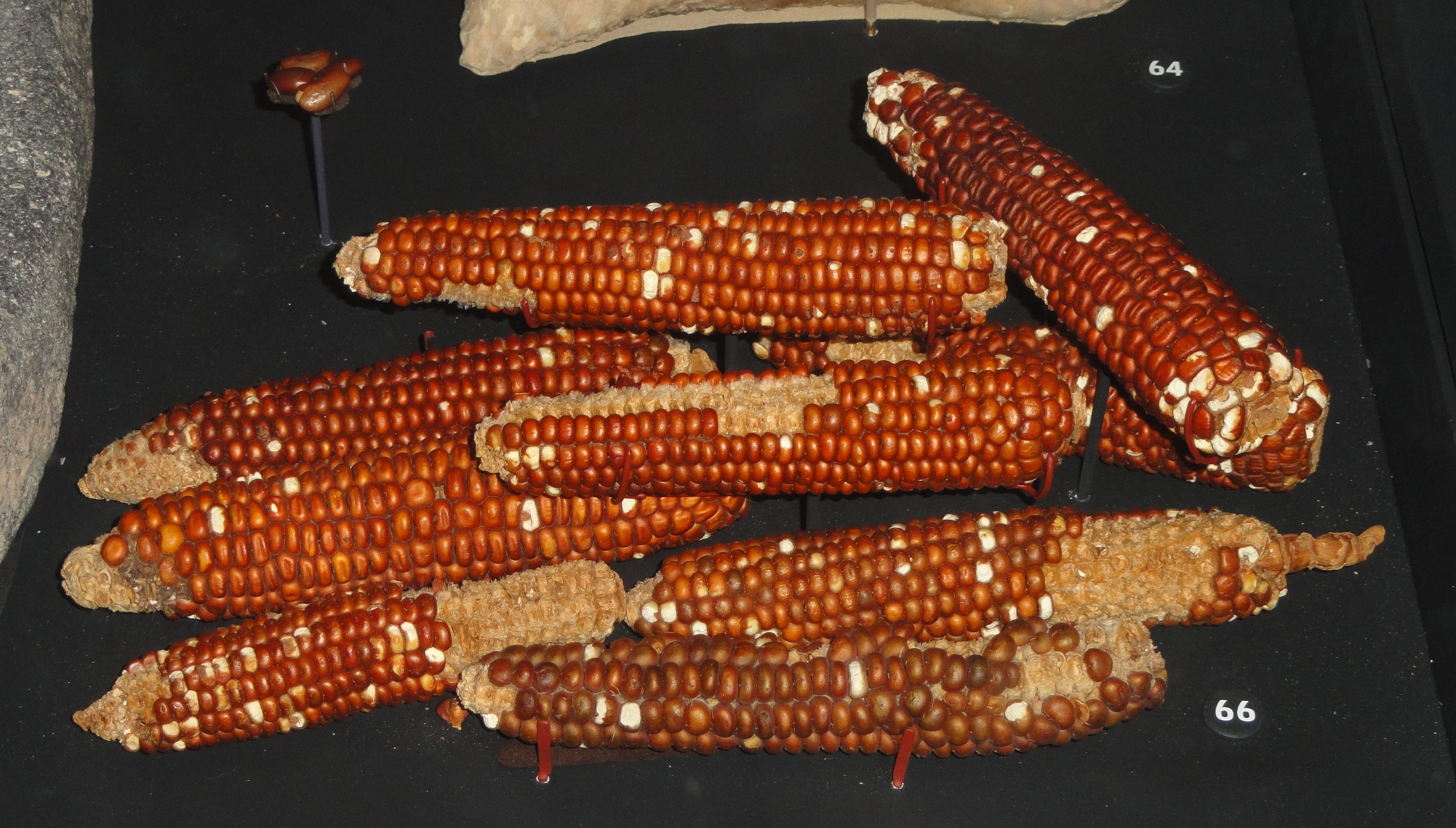
Corn was a vital source of food for Indigenous communities across the Northern Hemisphere. Sophisticated farming techniques were used to cultivate the crop throughout the American continent.

Native Americans utilized a number of cooking methods in early American cuisine that have been blended with the methods of early Europeans to form the basis of what is now Southern cuisine. Prior to the 1600s, native peoples lived off the land in very diverse bioregions and had done so for thousands of years, often living a nomadic life where their diet changed with the season.

Many practiced a form of agriculture revolving around the Three Sisters, the rotation of beans, maize, and squash as staples of their diet. Wild game was equally a staple of nearly every tribe: deer, elk, and bison were staples, as were rabbits and hare. The Cherokee of the Southern Appalachians used blowguns made of an indigenous type of bamboo to hunt squirrels.

Native Americans introduced the first non-Native American Southerners to many other vegetables still familiar on southern tables. Squash, pumpkin, beans, peppers, and sassafras all came to the settlers via Indigenous peoples. The Virginia Algonquian word pawcohiccora means hickory-nut meat or a nut milk drink made from it.

Many fruits are available in this region. Muscadines, blackberries, raspberries, and other wild berries were part of Southern Native Americans' diet.

To a far greater degree than anyone realizes, several of the most important food dishes of the Southeastern Indians live on today in the "soul food" eaten by both black and white Southerners. Hominy, for example, is still eaten ... Sofkee lives on as grits ... cornbread [is] used by Southern cooks ... Indian fritters ... variously known as "hoe cake", ... or "Johnny cake." ... Indians boiled cornbread is present in Southern cuisine as "corn meal dumplings", ... and as "hush puppies", ... Southerns cook their beans and field peas by boiling them, as did the Indians ... like the Indians they cure their meat and smoke it over hickory coals.

— Charles Hudson, The Southeastern Indians

=== Colonial era 1513 to 1776 and Antebellum era 1776 to 1861 ===
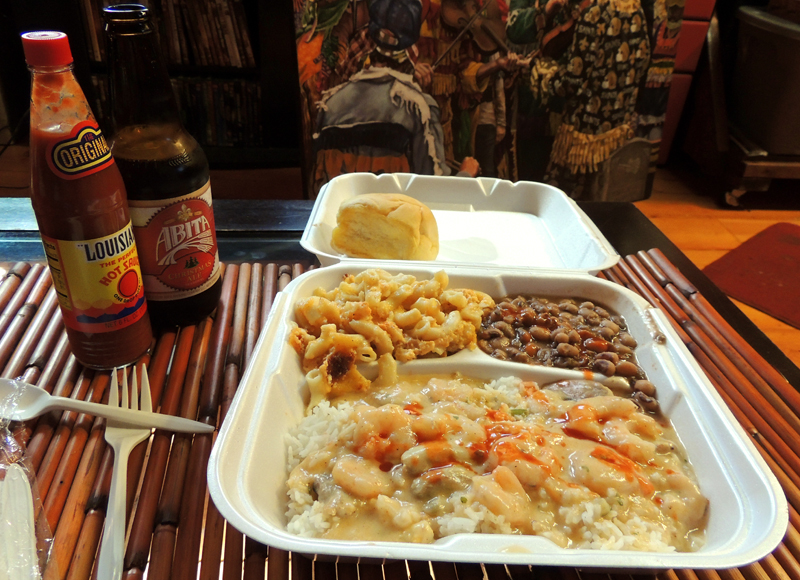
Shrimp and Crab Étouffée plate showing global influences of Southern food. Macaroni and cheese is a British dish. Black-eyed peas are from West Africa. Rice dishes were prepared by enslaved African Americans, Europeans, and Native Americans.

Southern food has influences from Native American, European, and West African cuisines and foods. From corn, Southeastern Native American tribes made grits, cornmeal mush, corn chowder, hush puppies, and cornbread that were adapted by European settlers and enslaved Africans. Another Native American influence in Southern cuisine is fried green tomatoes. Squash was - and continues to be - cooked by Native Americans and has a long shelf life when not cooked, and because of its long shelf-life African Americans and European Americans placed it in their kitchens. An additional Native American influence in Southern cuisine is the use of maple syrup. Settlers used honey and Indigenous people used maple syrup to sweeten and add flavor to dishes; this influenced the foodways of enslaved Africans and European settlers as they used maple syrup to sweeten their dishes and poured syrup over pancakes and other breakfast foods.

Other Indigenous influences are dried meats, smoked fish, and preparing meals with deer, rabbit, turtle, catfish, and eating local strawberries, blueberries, blackberries, raspberries, and cranberries. Foods cultivated by Indigenous people in the Western Hemisphere influenced Southern and global cuisine.

The first European nation to colonize the mainland portion of North America was Spain in the early 16th century in the year 1513 under Juan Ponce de León. In the year 1565, Spanish explorer Pedro Menéndez de Avilés established a settlement in St. Augustine, Florida and was accompanied by free and enslaved Africans. Two Spanish expeditions encountered the Apalachee in the first half of the 16th century. The expedition of Pánfilo de Narváez entered the Apalachee domain in 1528, and arrived at a village, which Narváez believed was the main settlement in Apalachee. The Apalachee Indigenous people influenced the foodways of Spanish colonists in Florida. Apalachee people prepared meals with hunted animals such as deer, rabbit, raccoon, and turkey (a bird indigenous to North America). They grew in their gardens corn, beans, squash, and sunflowers, and foraged for wild berries and nuts. From these food sources the Apalachee made stews and sweet flavored dishes. Spanish colonists enjoyed Native American cacina tea and turkey.

New Spain was in the present-day southern states of Florida and Louisiana. An article from the Florida Department of State explains the influence of the Spaniards in Southern cuisine: "The Spanish brought many foods to Florida (and the Americas) that are commonly eaten today. One major change to the landscape of Florida was the Spanish introduction of domesticated animals to provide favored meats, like beef, pork, and chicken! Olive oil and wine (brought over to the colonies in large earthenware jars) were essential staples for any Spanish kitchen. Fruits (like peaches, figs, and watermelons), nuts and beans (like almonds, field peas, and garbanzo beans) and spices (like saffron, cinnamon, and different types of peppers) were brought to Florida from all over the world."

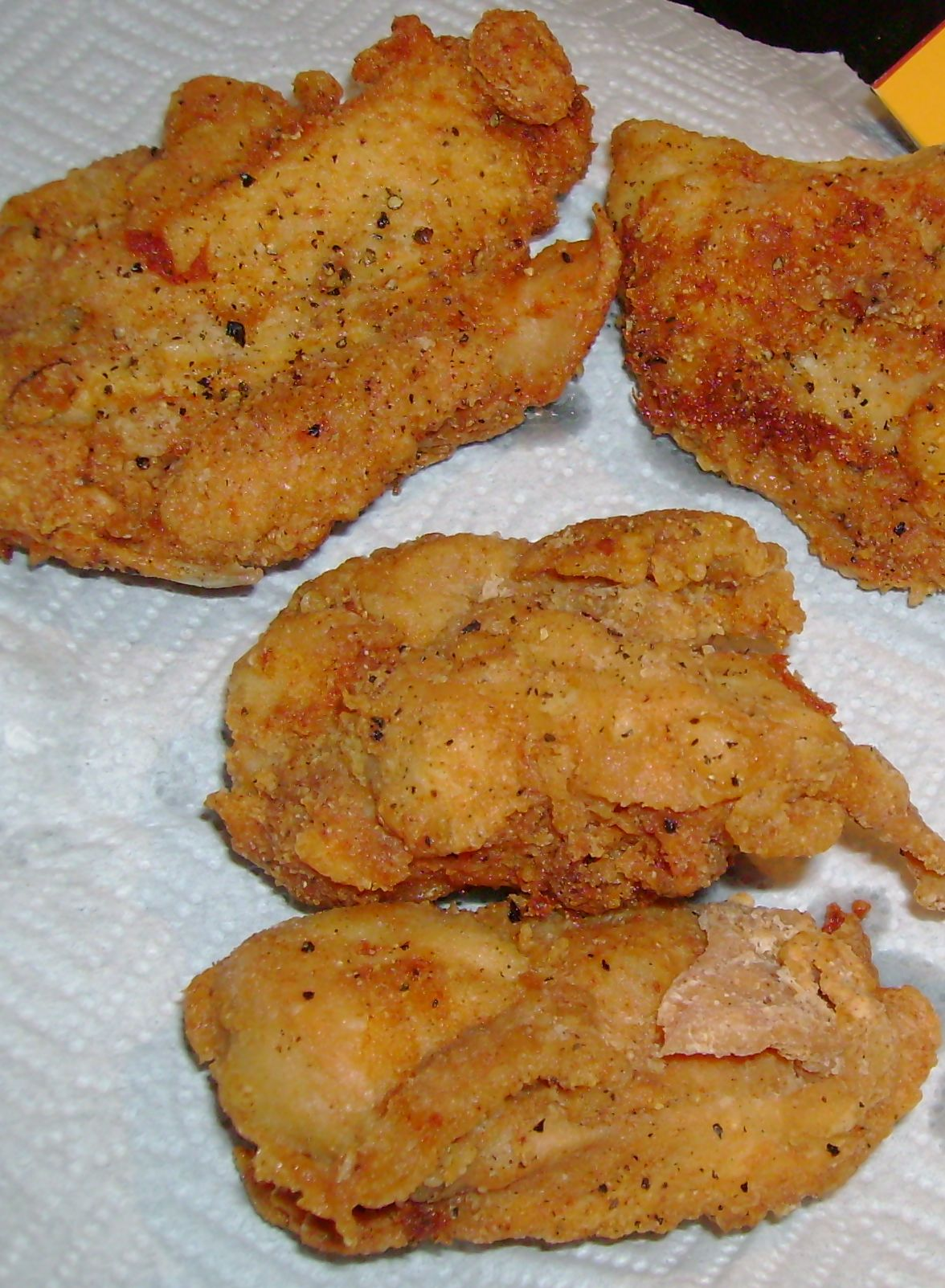
Southern American fried chicken have Scottish and West African influences.

The British established a permanent settlement in Jamestown, Virginia in 1607. They brought food traditions from London that also influenced Southern cuisine. British cuisine used cured and aged ham and English bread. These foods were augmented in colonial Jamestown with North American ingredients. As examples, the ham from Britain evolved into Virginia hams, and English breads became hot breads and other sweets. The predominant cooks in Virginia's kitchens were enslaved African Americans. Enslaved cooks in white plantation homes combined food traditions from West Africa with Native American and European cooking methods and prepared new dishes that influenced Southern cuisine, such as fried okra.

The origin of fried chicken in the southern states of America has been traced to precedents in Scottish and West African cuisine. Scottish fried chicken was battered with seasonings and cooked in lard. West Africans fried chicken with different seasonings, battered it and cooked in palm oil. Scottish frying and seasoning techniques and African seasoning techniques were used in the American South by enslaved Africans. At Monticello in Virginia, President Thomas Jefferson noted how the enslaved prepared meals with the African crop sesame seeds. Enslaved people ate sesame raw, toasted, or boiled. They prepared stews, baked breads and boiled their greens with sesame seeds. They made sesame pudding. European colonists used sesame seeds to make baked breads.

In the 17th and 18th centuries, English colonists in Virginia came into contact with Powhatan Indigenous people and adapted corn into their cuisine. Johnny cakes, corn pone, and fry bread became a part of their diet. English settlers at Jamestown were not prepared to survive in Virginia's wilderness. Settlers experienced the "starving time" in the winter of 1609 to 1610. Powhatan people taught the English how to hunt, fish and grow corn to survive. The food and survival skills English settlers learned from Natives became a part of their daily lives. However, most Jamestown's residents did not survive that winter because of dwindling food supplies.

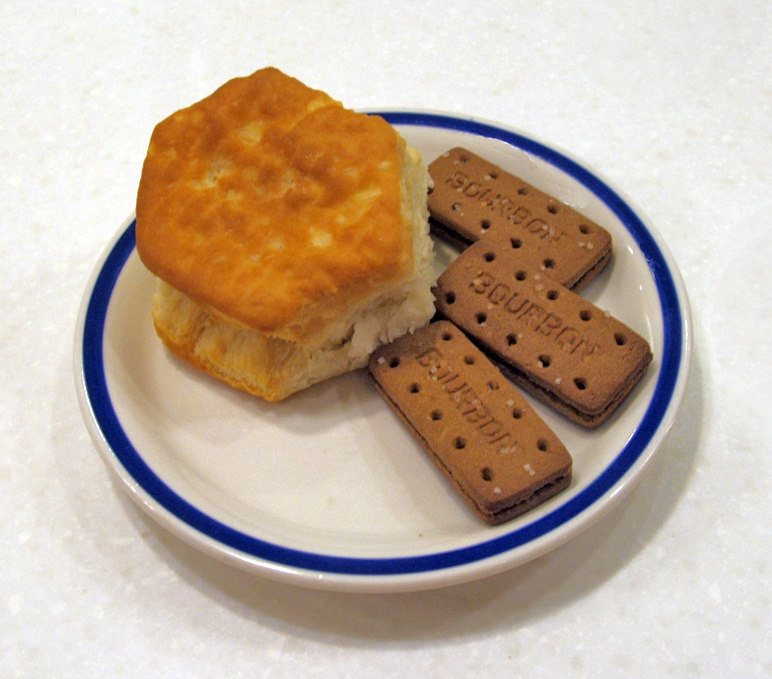
A Southern American biscuit (left) and British biscuits (right)

Colonial Williamsburg, Virginia was founded in 1632 by the English. Historians at Colonial Williamsburg researched colonial records and found what colonists in Williamsburg ate. The dishes colonial cooks prepared for Williamsburg's upper class included roast pigeon, fried ox tongue, mince pies and meat dishes from beef, lamb, pork and chicken. They made fish with vegetables, and baked breads. They drank coffee, tea and hot chocolate. An article in the newspaper, The Warren Record, explains the influence of the English and Scottish on Southern American food: "English settlers in the South baked yeast bread, made savory puddings and drank beer...." "Settlers from lowland Scotland brought with them a tradition of cooking a kale soup and drinking distilled beverages."

English and Scottish settlers introduced biscuits into Southern breakfast. In England and Ireland people ate scones as part of a meal and were taken aboard ships during long voyages because they lasted longer and did not spoil like other foods. In the Southern United States, Americans evolved the scone recipe and made fluffier biscuits and poured gravy, honey and jam over them which became a popular breakfast item. Biscuits and Scones share similar ingredients, but differ in that biscuits are layered with butter, and scones do not use buttermilk as an ingredient.Biscuits were an economical food for Southerners after the mid-19th century as they were made with simple ingredients of flour, baking powder, salt, butter, and milk.

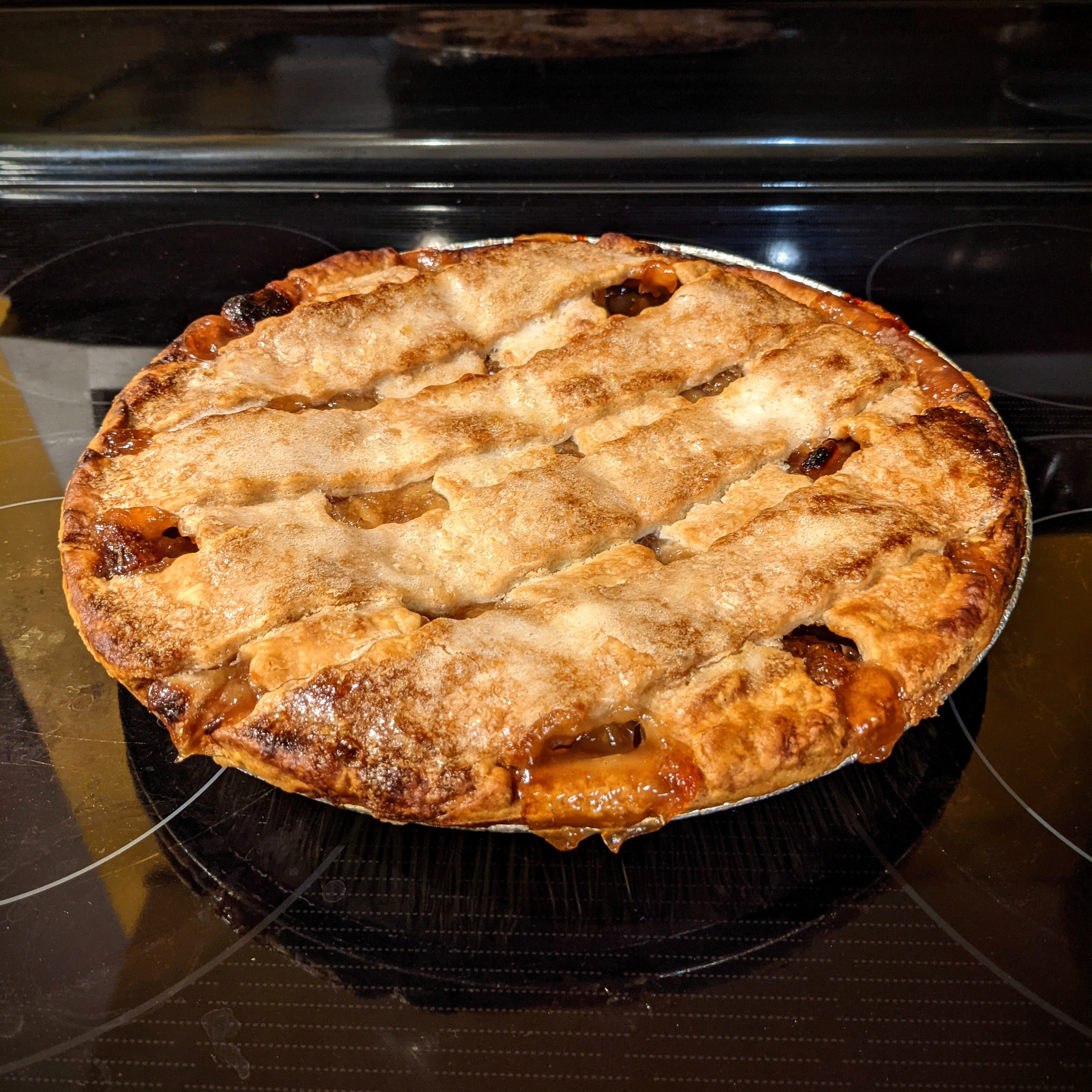
European cuisine influenced the American pie tradition

In 1614, the Dutch East India Company established several settlements in Maryland and other Northern colonies. In 1625 Dutch New Amsterdam was incorporated in what today is New York City.Dutch colonists introduced pancakes, waffles, doughnuts, cookies, coleslaw and pretzels into the cuisine of the Thirteen Colonies. Colonial records showed Dutch people brought their waffle irons from the Netherlands to colonial America. The English and Dutch introduced pies which enslaved African Americans and other Southerners adapted into their cuisine. European settlers prepared pies because they preserved food. They made meat and sweet pies using local ingredients and other ingredients from foreign countries. An article from Southern Living Magazine explains the history of the Southern American pie tradition: "The mixture of eggs, butter, sugar, vanilla, and flour made its way to the American South from England. It became popular in Virginia and has had many incarnations, from the Classic Chess Pie to fruity versions, like Lemon Chess Pie."

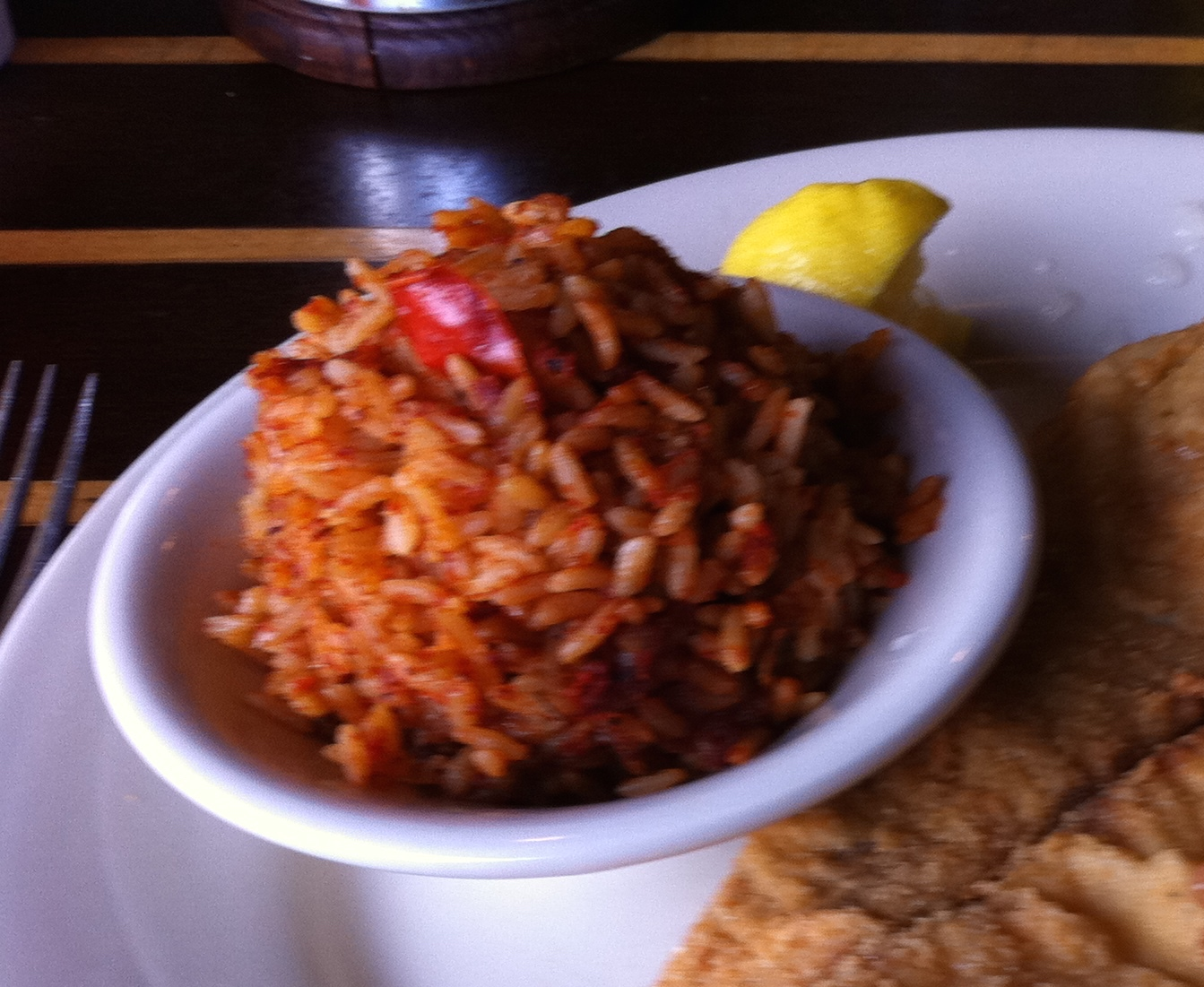
Charleston red rice in South Carolina originated from West African jollof rice.

Enslaved Africans influence in Southern cuisine are food items from West Africa such as okra, black-eyed peas, one-pot rice cooking methods to make stews that influenced the making of gumbo and jambalaya, and adding a variety of spices and hot and sweet sauces to Southern dishes. West-Central Africans were trafficked to the South as early as 1526 under Spanish explorers to the colonies of South Carolina and Georgia called San Miguel de Gualdape, and enslaved people from Angola were brought to colonial Virginia in 1619. Other foods brought from West Africa during the slave trade that influenced Southern cuisine were guinea pepper, gherkin, sesame seeds, kola nuts, eggplant, watermelon, rice, and cantaloupe.

Gullah Geechee people in the Sea Islands of South Carolina and Georgia influenced some of the Southern rice-based dishes. West Africans in the rice growing regions of present-day Senegal, Sierra Leone, and Liberia cultivated African rice for about 3,000 years. African rice is a species related to, yet distinct from, Asian rice. It was originally domesticated in the inland delta of the Upper Niger River. Once Carolinian and Georgian planters in the American South discovered that African rice would grow in that region, they often sought enslaved Africans from rice-growing regions because they had the skills and knowledge needed to develop and build irrigation, dams and earthworks. Rice-based dishes created by Gullah people are Charleston red rice and Hoppin' John. Enslaved African Americans grew collard greens in their gardens. They incorporated collards in their soups and stews a tradition that came from West Africa. As the National Museum of African American History and Culture explained that African Americans in the American South spread the recipe of collard greens to other parts of the United States when they left the South during the Great Migration.

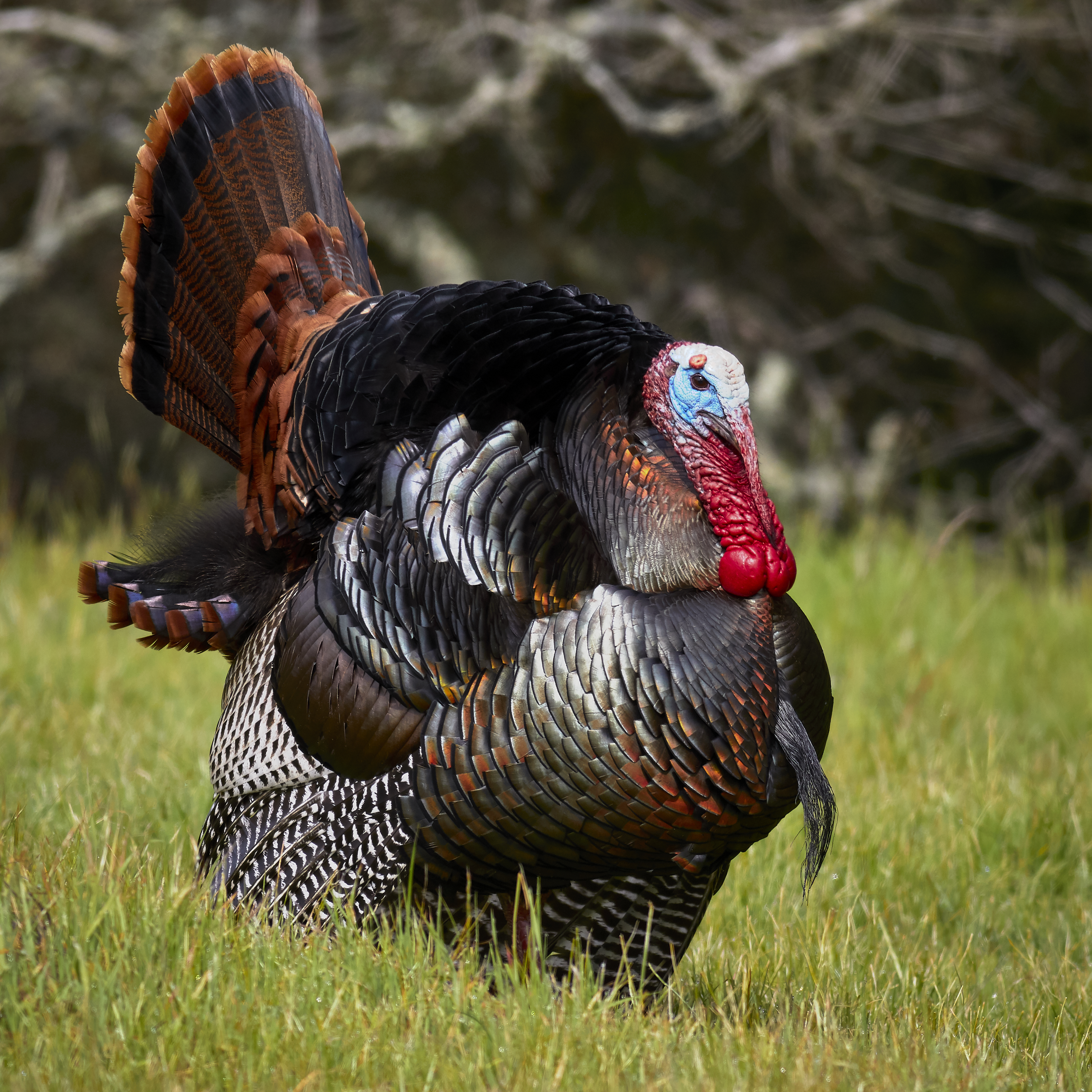
Turkeys are indigenous to North America and were hunted by Native Americans for food. Turkey recipes in Southern cuisine were influenced by Indigenous people.

The French established a permanent settlement in the South in present-day New Orleans, Louisiana in 1718. French colonists relied on Indigenous people to survive. Historian Gwendolyn Midlo Hall explained how the French learned from the Chitimacha and other Indigenous people about the flora and fauna, topography of the land, how to build boats and navigate the waters, how to preserve food, and cultivate corn, squash, potatoes, and other indigenous crops. The first enslaved Africans to arrive in Louisiana came in 1719 aboard two slave ships that brought several barrels of rice seeds. African rice became a staple in Louisiana cuisine cultivated by enslaved people from West Africa's rice growing regions.

French people incorporated roux into Louisiana cuisine that influenced the making of gumbo. Another French influence is mirepoix made with carrots, celery, and onion that became a Creole and Cajun version in Louisiana called the "holy trinity" made with bell peppers, celery and onions. Indigenous peoples of Louisiana during the colonial period (and into present day) made fry bread and Indian tacos. They also prepared meals with hunted animals such as turkey and deer and caught fish. Native Americans in Louisiana influenced the foodways of African Americans and European Americans as non-Natives prepared their meals with turkey, cornbread, and other Indigenous staples.

Spaniards and enslaved West Africans influenced the making of jambalaya in New Orleans. Some historians suggest jambalaya has its roots in West African cuisine. The French introduced the tomato (a food native to the Americas) to West Africans, and they incorporated the food into their one-pot rice cooking meals and enhanced jollof rice and created jambalaya. Author Ibraham Seck, director of research at the Whitney Plantation Slave Museum in St. John the Baptist Parish, suggests jambalaya originated on the Senegalese coast of West Africa. Senegalese people had knowledge of rice cultivation and created dishes using rice and meats that were brought to Louisiana during the era of the slave trade. About sixty percent of enslaved Africans brought to Louisiana came from Senegambia. Senegambians had knowledge of rice cultivation and prepared meals using rice and other grains adding meat and vegetables into one pot. An article from the United Nations states that the cuisines of Nigeria, Senegal, Guinea, and Benin influenced the development of jambalaya: "Jambalaya (mixed rice, meat and vegetables), feijoada (black beans and meat), gombo(okra), and hopping johns (peas) are all dishes that have been re-adapted from Senegal, Nigeria, Guinea and Benin. You will find variations of these dishes in America and the Caribbean region."

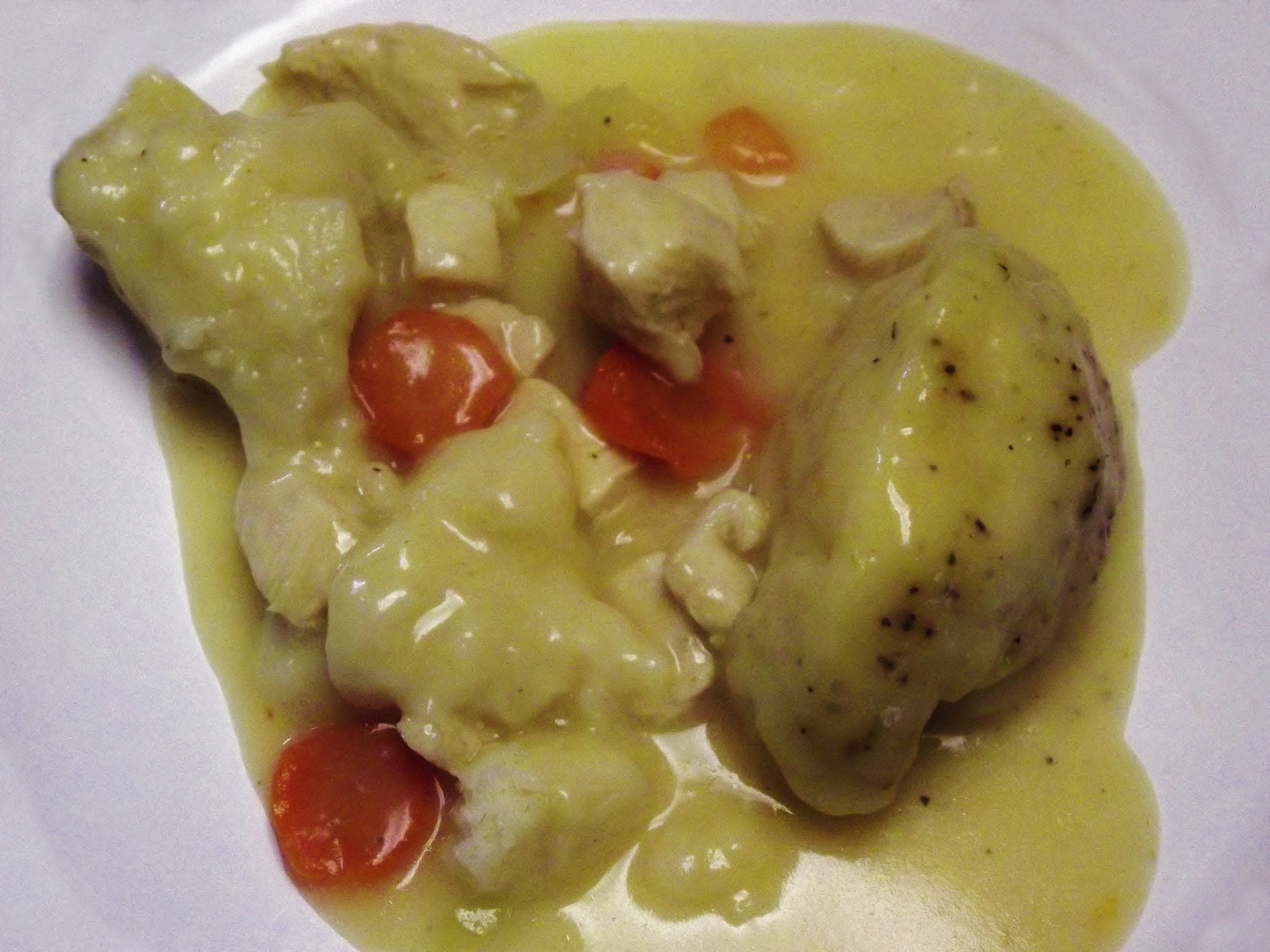
German cuisine influenced the making of chicken and dumplings.

German immigrants came to colonial America beginning in 1608 and helped to start the colony of Jamestown, Virginia and established settlements in the Shenandoah Valley. They brought food traditions from Germany and influenced cuisine in America. The classic southern dish chicken and dumplings have origins in German cuisine. "...the famous southern dish, Chicken and Dumplings, received its birth from the German influence of Spaetzel, which are small potato dumplings, even smaller than its Italian cousin, gnocchi." Other German influences are beef liver dishes, German sausages, and liver dumplings. German people also influenced cuisine in Louisiana after their arrival to the colony in 1722.For example, "German sausage making is called andouille. Andouille sausage is a combination of pork, pork fat, salt, garlic, red pepper and black pepper, all packed into a sausage casing, which is smoked over sugar cane and pecan logs. When smoked, the sausage becomes very dark in color." This method of preparation of sausage is found in between St. Charles and St. John Baptist parishes. (There is great debate regarding whether Andouille sausage has German roots. Most sources state the sausage began, and was named in France, after the Andouilette sausage of the Champaign region).German foods such as marinated meats, pastries, sour flavors, and wursts were assimilated into the Southern diet and they became classic American foods that are eaten today in the form of hot dogs and hamburgers.

The Southern side dish potato salad has German influence. An article from South Carolina National Public Radio (NPR) explains:

"The earliest written recipes for American potato salad date to the mid-19th century. Cooked potatoes were typically dressed with oil, vinegar and herbs, which culinary historians believe were introduced by German immigrants who had a penchant for sour, sweet and spicy ingredients such as vinegar, sugar and coarse mustard. Hot potato salad, usually made with bacon, onion and vinegar dressing, was so closely associated with German immigrants that it was called 'German potato salad.'"

Culinary historians do not know who added mayonnaise to potato salad. Mayonnaise became available to purchase in the early 1900s. By the 1920s and 1930s, people were adding mayonnaise to potato salad.

=== American Civil War (1861 to 1865) ===
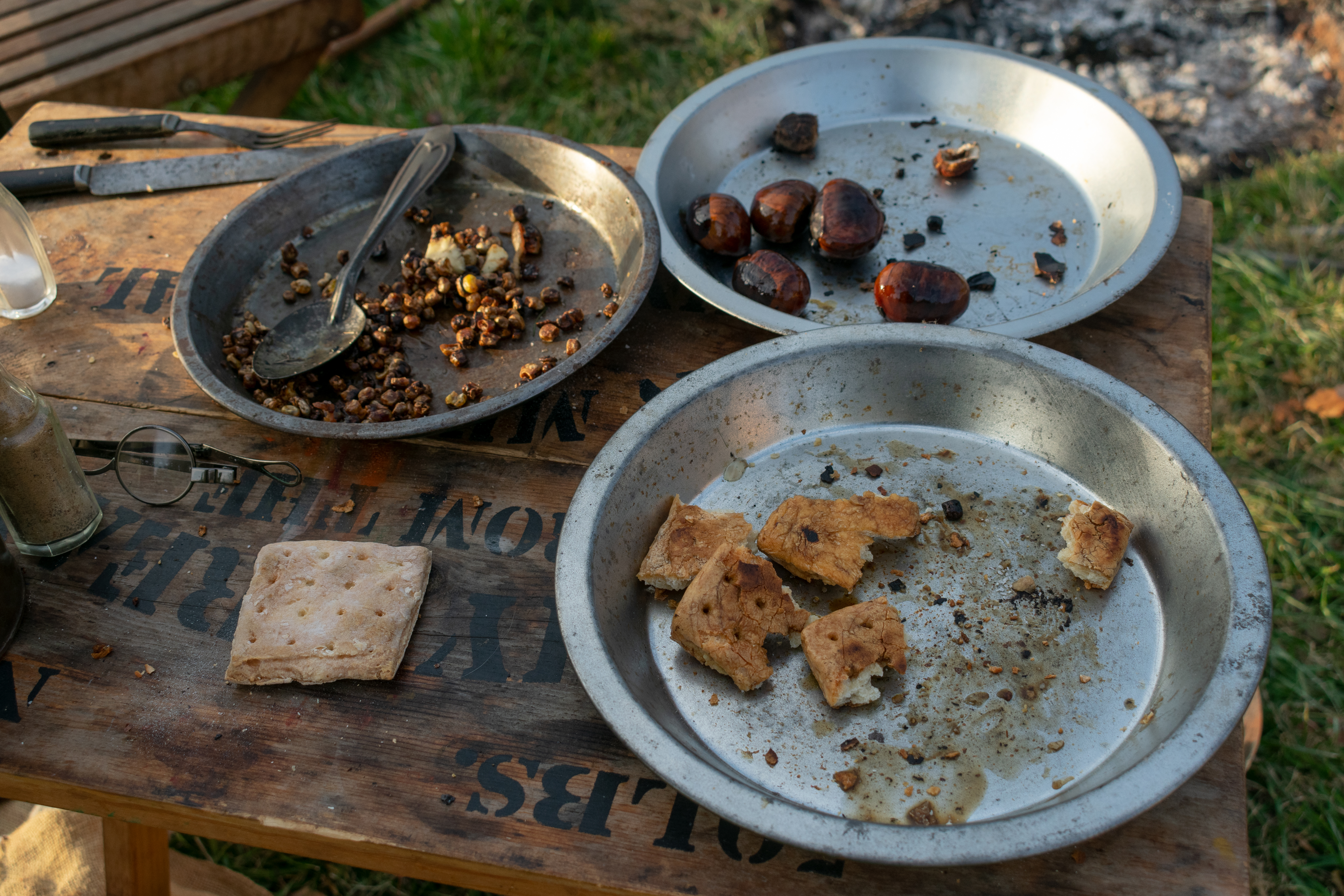
The food of American Civil War soldiers at Chatham in Fredericksburg and Spotsylvania National Military Park, Virginia

During the American Civil War, food supplies were limited for Union and Confederate soldiers. Civil War soldiers received limited food rations which consisted of bread, coffee, salt pork, hard bread, a pound of beef or pork and a pound of bread or flour, and sometimes extras which included dried beans or peas, rice, vinegar, and molasses. Historians found that a lot of food was fried during the Civil War. An article from the Florida Department of State explains the soldier's diet: "The most common form of hard bread, was called hardtack, a basic wheat biscuit that did not easily decay and could survive a rough march. It was extremely hard, and was often soaked in water, coffee, or in meat fat to soften it enough to eat. Other items, such as beans, peas, rice, coffee, sugar, or salt, were also issued, but not on a daily basis." Enslaved African Americans prepared meals for wealthy Confederate soldiers. In Union camps, contraband of war (Freedmen) and other cooks prepared meals for the Union army. Over time, rations between Union and Confederate armies varied as Confederate rations were reduced in wheat and livestock because of a Union blockade that prevented the Confederates from obtaining food and supplies.

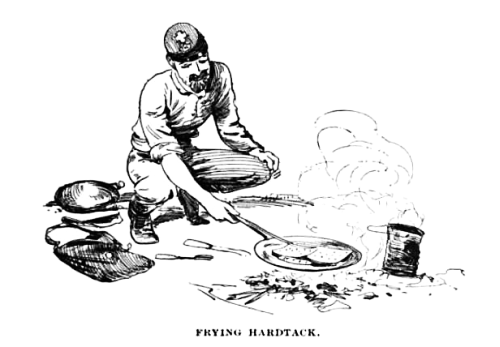
Civil War soldier frying hardtack

Hardtack was not available to many Confederates because it was made from wheat, and wheat was not grown in many Southern states except for Georgia and Virginia. Cornbread replaced the hardtack rations in the Confederate army. Confederate soldiers made Johnnie cakes and "corn dodgers" that was similar to hardtack. In addition, they made fried flatbread and balls of cornmeal called "flapjacks" cooked over an open fire, and ate bacon, imitation coffee, and molasses. In some Southern hospitals patients ate dried fruit, potatoes, mush, beef, chicken soup, and bread. Despite limited rations, some Union soldiers were able to make hearty meals. The meals prepared were "...chicken fricassee, mushroom ketchup (a condiment made by boiling mushrooms), a beef-and-potato stew, cornish game hens and ham and beans". Union and Confederates foraged for food when rations were low and cooked the fresh food they found. They also ate desiccated vegetables which were dehydrated and compressed vegetables into one inch by one-foot rectangular bricks that were made from string beans, turnips, carrots, beets, and onions. Other vegetables were packed into cakes, dried, and boiled for consumption.

=== Post antebellum era ===
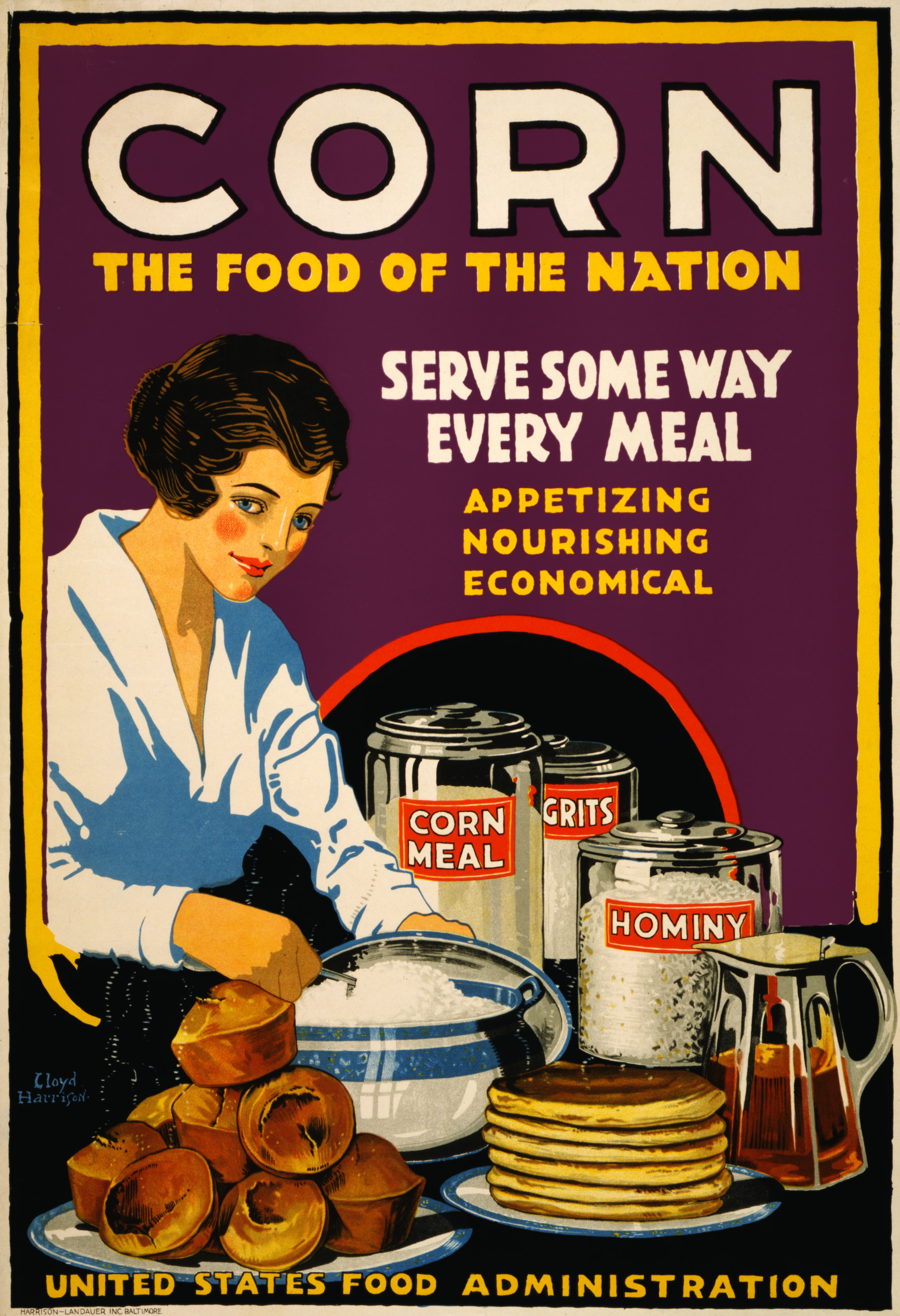
Corn, the food of the nation, US Food Administration poster, 1918

Interest in American regional cooking continued to grow after the Civil War, especially concerning the traditions of the Southern United States. Many new cookbooks were added to the existing body of literature. Some of these fell within the scope of domestic manuals offering instruction to southern homemakers to the maintenance of homes in the new post-Slavery era. Some of these works like Mary Stuart Smith's Virginia Cookery Book (1885) aimed to preserve the culinary heritage of the South. Recipes made by former slaves were published in African-American cookbooks after the Civil War. The earliest such cookbook was self-published in 1866 by Malinda Russell as a pamphlet titled, A Domestic Cookbook: Containing a Careful Selection of Useful Receipts for the Kitchen. A cookbook published in 1900 in the city of Charleston, South Carolina had recipes used by formerly enslaved Gullah people. Benne seeds from sesame, a plant native to West Africa, were eaten raw with sugar or milk. Enslaved people also made cakes, wafers, and brittles from them for white plantation families.

In the Appalachian region, 19th-century meals included greens fried in bear grease, elk backstrap steaks and venison stew. Ashcakes were cornbread cooked directly on hearth coals. Cornbread was the most common bread in the mountains, and still remains a staple. As wheat flour and baking powder/baking soda became available in the late 19th century, buttermilk biscuits became popular. Today, buttermilk biscuits and sausage gravy are the classic Appalachian breakfast; they are also a common breakfast everywhere where Appalachian people have emigrated. Both North Carolina and West Virginia have statewide biscuit chain restaurants; many Southern or originally-Southern chains offer biscuits and gravy, and when McDonald's introduced a new breakfast menu selling either Egg McMuffins (with English muffins) or a variant with biscuits, the biscuit zone was practically a map of the South with the exception of Virginia, Maryland, and Florida.

The American hot dog originated from German sausages called "frankfurts" in Frankfurt-am-Main, Germany. Sausages in Germany were served without bread. Charles L Feltman was a German immigrant and came to Coney Island, New York in 1856 and served sausages wrapped in a bun beginning in 1867. This method of eating sausages later spread across America making its way into the Southern states and are eaten at baseball games. Southerners make different versions of hot dogs, giving them a southern flavor. Some Southern hot dogs have brown sugar mustard as a topping. In Huntsville, Alabama, hot dogs are served with chili and ketchup-slaw. In Mobile, Alabama, hot dogs are served on a toasted bun with a mustard-based coleslaw.

=== Other cultural influences ===
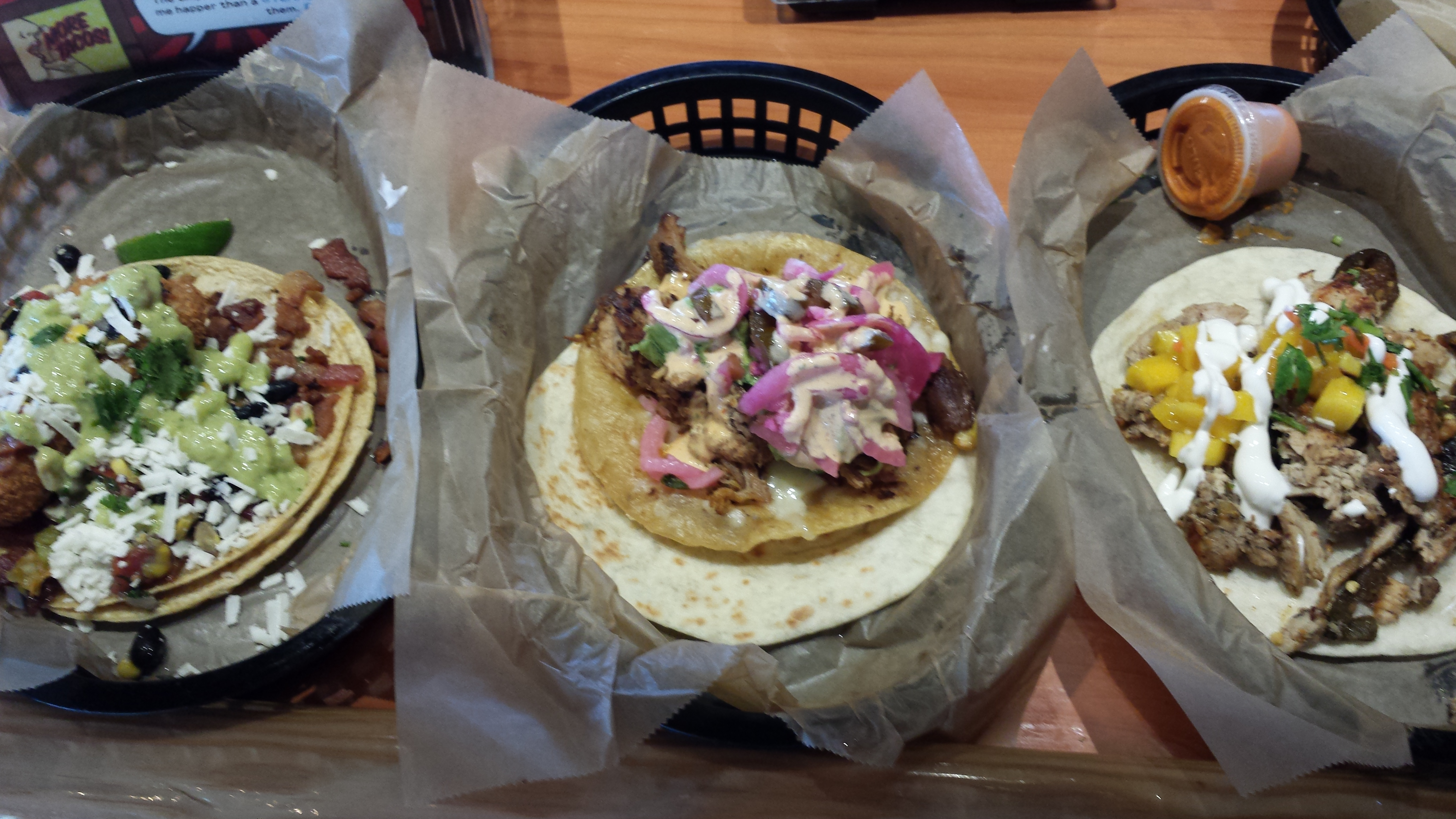
Texas tacos from Waco, Texas

Since the 20th century into present day, immigrants from Asia, the Middle East, Africa, and other European countries brought their cuisines to the South and influenced southern cuisine. An article from Time Magazine explains: "...immigrants and their American-born sons and daughters have helped transform the perception of Southern cuisine into something beyond biscuits and gravy and mint juleps. Southern food is now kebabs in Nashville's Little Kurdistan, one of the largest enclaves of Kurds in the U.S. It's Greek diners across Alabama and Ethiopian restaurants standing next to Salvadoran pupuserías in Virginia. In rural towns that have seen their populations decline, it's the Chinese or Mexican restaurant that took over former greasy spoons while preserving them as de facto community centers. And in reborn urban centers, it's the Michelin-approved fine-dining restaurants where chefs have fused techniques from India, Laos and Nigeria with the staples of the Southern canon."

Mexican food culture influence on Southern cuisine is tacos. Texas was once a part of Mexico until it declared independence on March 2, 1836, and became a US state in 1845. Tex-Mex food is a fusion of Texas cuisine with Northern Mexican. Tacos in Texas have barbecued meats from pork, chicken, brisket, vegetables, and Mexican salsa. Indigenous people of Texas hunted pronghorn, deer, rabbits, turkeys, and quail. They made flour from ground acorns and mesquite pods. The Indigenous nations of the Antelope Creek in the Panhandle, the Caddo in East Texas, and the Jornada Mogollon near El Paso influenced Southern foodways as venison, catfish, and pecans are staples in Texas cuisine. The Tejanos are a multiethnic people of Spanish and Native American heritage, and their food influenced Texas cuisine. A common dish in Texas is chili con carne made with cumin, black pepper, garlic, onion, and beef are all foreign imported foods, and the chiles come from Mexico. Tamale is a dish native to Central America and Mexico. The Tejanos' Indigenous ancestors brought tamales to Texas.

=== Southern food in restaurants ===
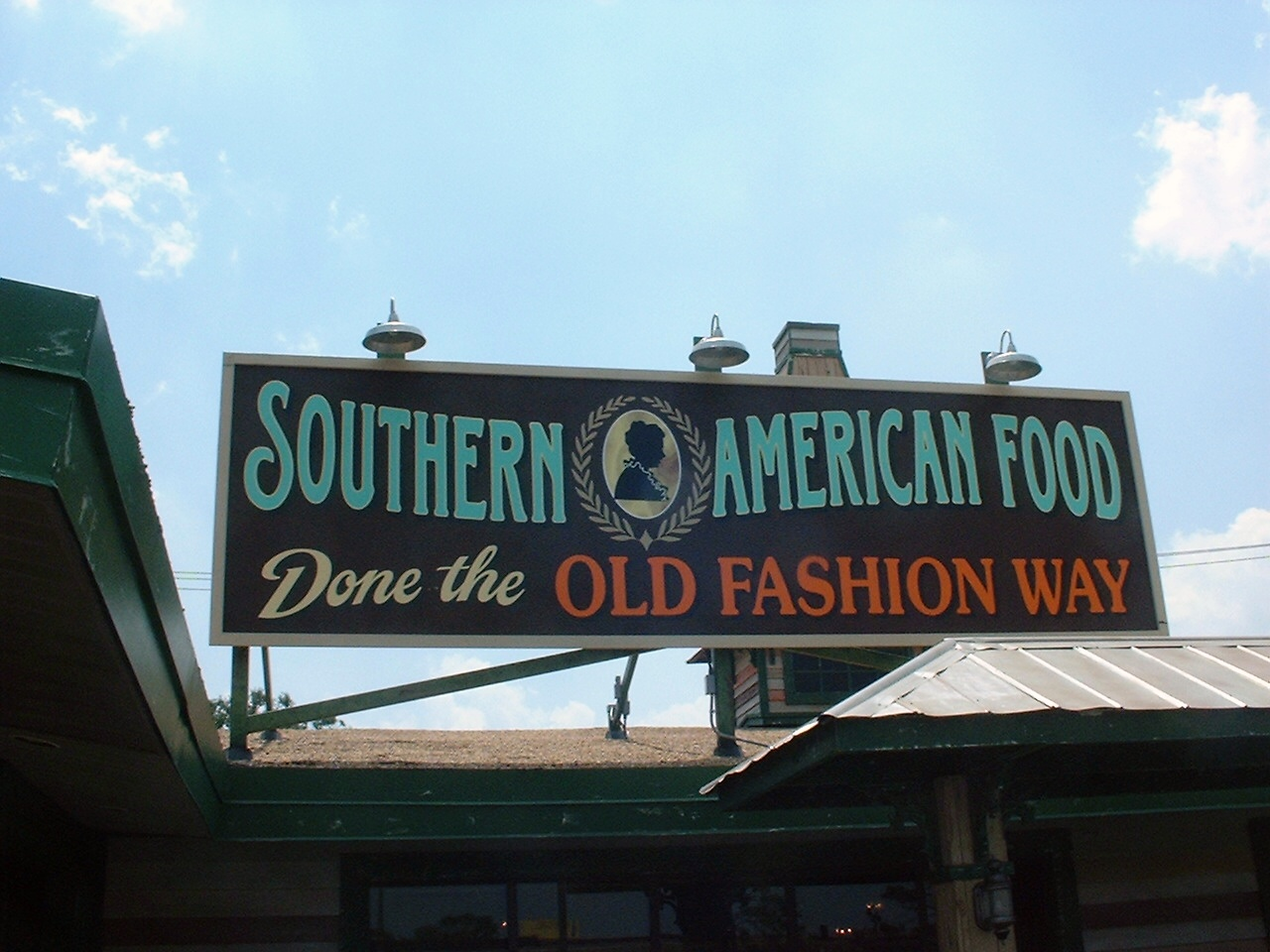
A Southern restaurant in the Florida Panhandle.

Chains serving Southern foods—often along with American comfort food—have had great success; many have spread across the country or across the world, while others have chosen to stay in the South. Pit barbecue is popular all over the American South; unlike the rest of the country, most of the rural South has locally owned, non-franchise pit-barbecue restaurants, many serving the regional style of barbecue instead of the nationally predominant Kansas City style. Family-style restaurants serving Southern cuisine are common throughout the South, and range from the humble and down-home to the decidedly upscale.

During the civil rights movement, soul food restaurants were places where civil rights leaders and activists met to discuss and strategize civil rights protests and ideas for implementing social and political change. Paschal's Restaurant in Atlanta, like Georgia Gilmore's eatery in Montgomery, had an important part in the civil rights movement. Upon returning to Atlanta from Montgomery, Martin Luther King Jr. got permission "to bring his team members and guests to Paschal's to eat, meet, rest, plan, and strategize".

== Traditional Southern dishes ==
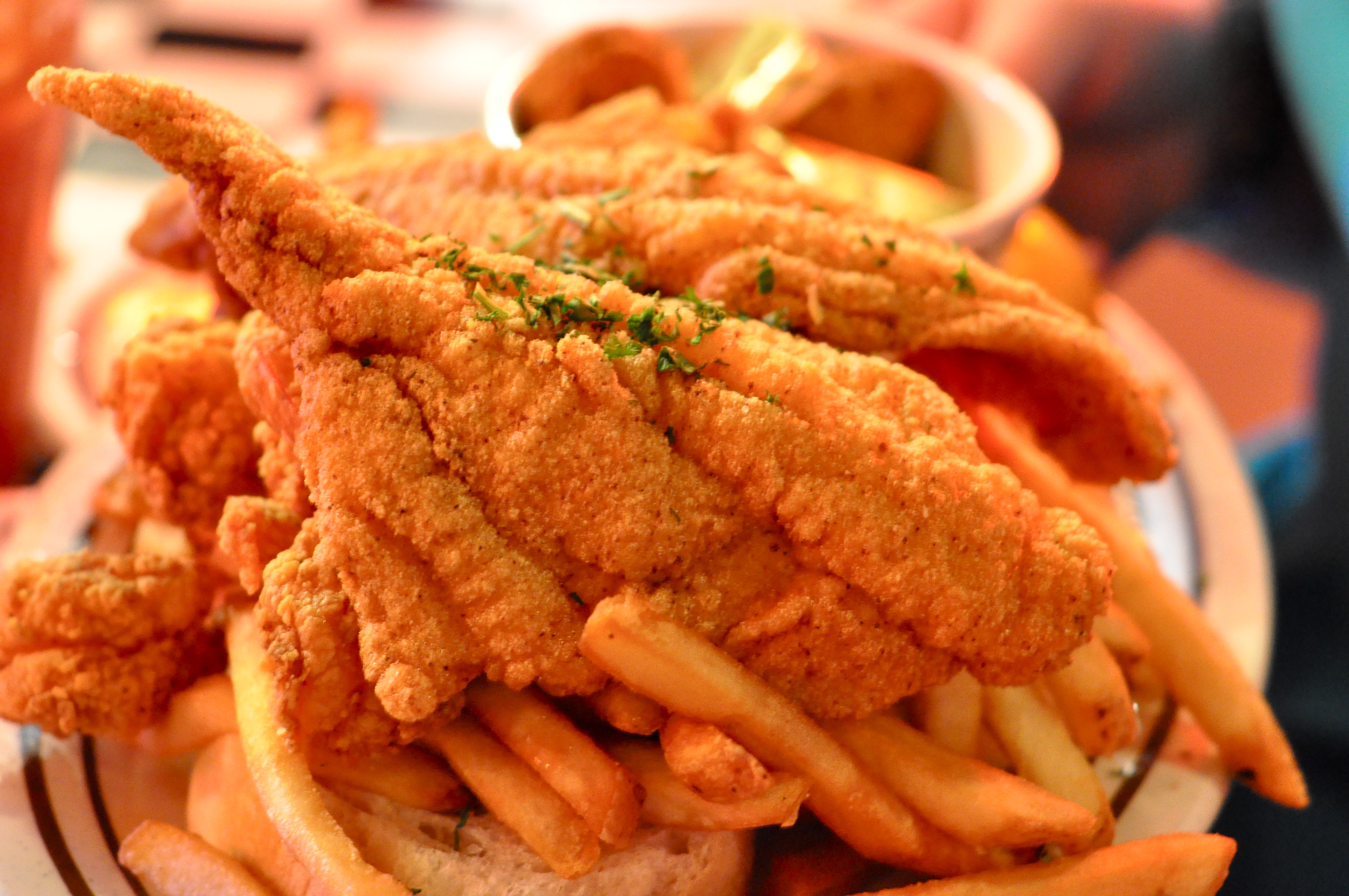
Fried catfish is a popular meal.

A traditional Southern meal may include fried chicken, field peas (such as black-eyed peas), greens (such as collard greens, mustard greens, turnip greens, or poke sallet), mashed potatoes, cornbread or corn pone, sweet tea, and dessert—typically a pie (sweet potato, chess, shoofly, pecan, and peach are the most common), or a cobbler (peach, blackberry, sometimes apple in Kentucky, Tennessee, or Appalachia).

Other Southern foods include grits, country ham, hushpuppies, beignets (in the Gulf South), Southern styles of succotash, brisket, meatloaf, chicken fried steak, buttermilk biscuits (may be served with butter, jelly, fruit preserves, honey, gravy or sorghum molasses), pimento cheese, boiled or baked sweet potatoes, pit barbecue, fried catfish, fried green tomatoes, macaroni and cheese, bread pudding, okra (principally fried okra that has been dredged in cornmeal, but also steamed, stewed, sauteed, or pickled), butter beans, and pinto beans.

=== Barbecue ===
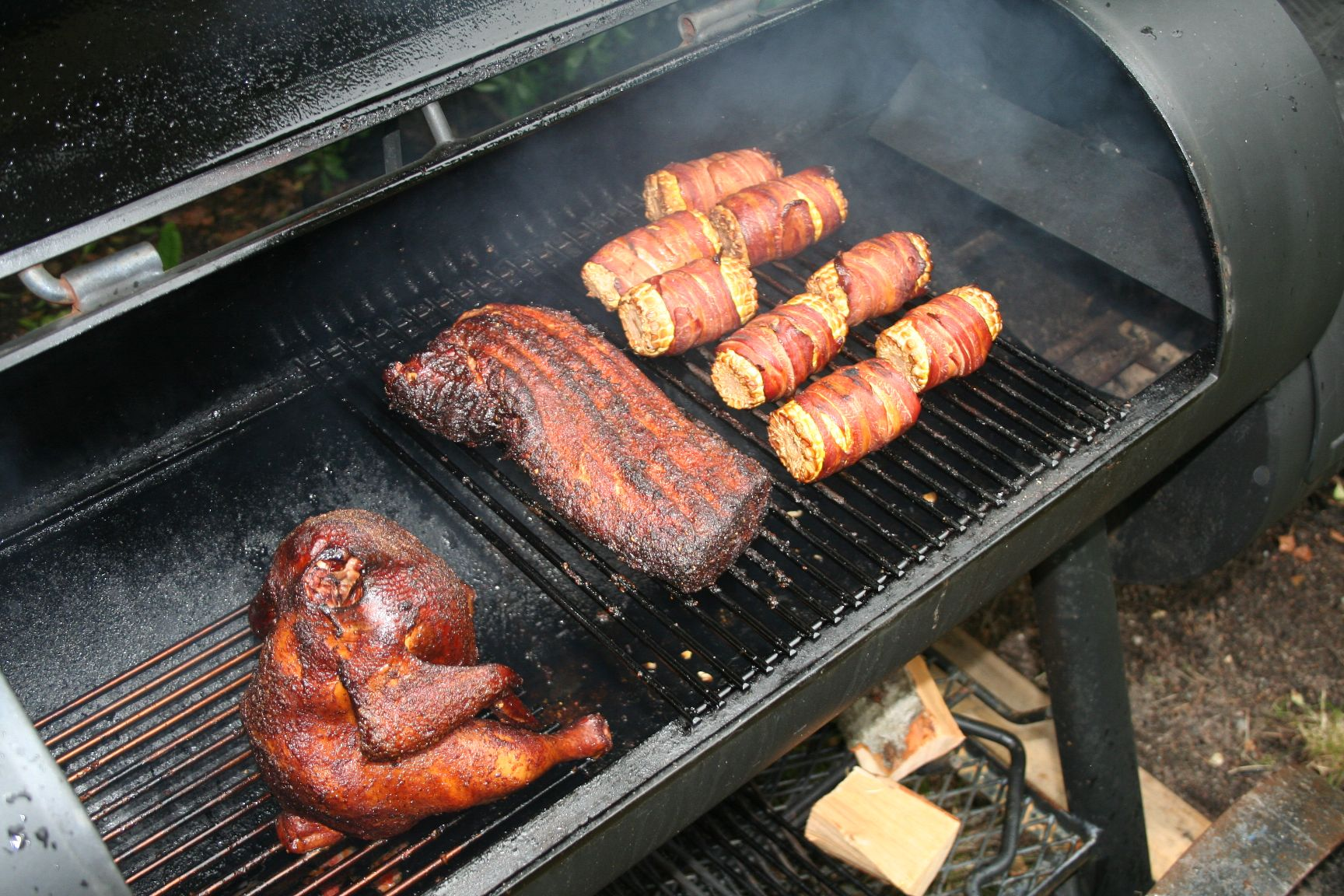
Barbecued chicken, pork, and corn wrapped in bacon

"White barbecue sauce" made with mayonnaise, pepper and vinegar is a specialty of Alabama barbecue usually served with smoked barbecue chicken.

"Yellow barbecue sauce" made with a mustard base is unique to South Carolina barbecue and has roots in the mass immigration of Germans to the area in the mid-1700s.

For barbecue in the United States, each Southern locale has its own variety of barbecue, particularly sauces. In recent years, the regional variations have blurred as restaurants and consumers experiment and adapt the styles of other regions. South Carolina is the only state that traditionally features all four recognized barbecue sauces, including mustard-based, vinegar-based, and light and heavy tomato-based sauces. North Carolina sauces vary by region; eastern North Carolina uses a vinegar-based sauce, the center of the state uses Lexington-style barbecue, with a combination of ketchup and vinegar as its base, and western North Carolina uses a heavier ketchup base. Memphis barbecue is best known for tomato- and vinegar-based sauces. In some Memphis establishments and in Kentucky, meat is rubbed with dry seasoning (dry rubs) and smoked over hickory wood without sauce. The finished barbecue is then served with barbecue sauce on the side.

=== Fried chicken ===
Fried chicken is among the region's best-known exports. It is believed that the Scots, and later Scottish immigrants to many Southern states, had a tradition of deep-frying chicken in batter with seasonings and fat, unlike their English counterparts who baked or boiled chicken. However, some sources trace the origin of fried chicken to Southern and Western England where most of the early settlers to the South came from. They conclude that Southern and Western England had a strong tradition of frying, simmering, and sautéing meats in a skillet as opposed to East Anglia which favored baking and boiling meats.

The importance of fried chicken to Southern cuisine is apparent through the multiple traditions and different adaptations of fried chicken, such as KFC, Nashville's Prince's Hot Chicken Shack, the Nashville-styled Dave's Hot Chicken or the Cajun-inspired Bojangles' Famous Chicken 'n Biscuits and Popeyes Chicken.

=== Pork and ham ===
Pork is an integral part of the cuisine. Stuffed ham is served in Southern Maryland. A traditional holiday get-together featuring whole hog barbecue is known in Virginia and the Carolinas and involves pit-smoking a hog. In much of the South, whole hogs are grilled as part of a "pig pickin'".

Green beans are often flavored with bacon and salt pork, turnip greens are stewed with pork and served with vinegar, ham biscuits (biscuits cut in half with slices of salt ham served between the halves) often accompany breakfast, and ham with red-eye gravy or country gravy is a common dinner dish.

Country ham, a heavily salt-cured ham, is common across the Southern United States, with the most well-known being the Virginia-originating Smithfield ham.

Pig feet, often called trotters, are perhaps less common because they are considered a southern delicacy, but can be prepared in a variety of ways. They are most often either pickled in white vinegar or braised in a mixture of sweet and smoky flavors, but can also be deep-fried, grilled, and stewed. They are usually served among other soul dishes such as yams, cornbread, and collard greens.

=== Vegetables ===
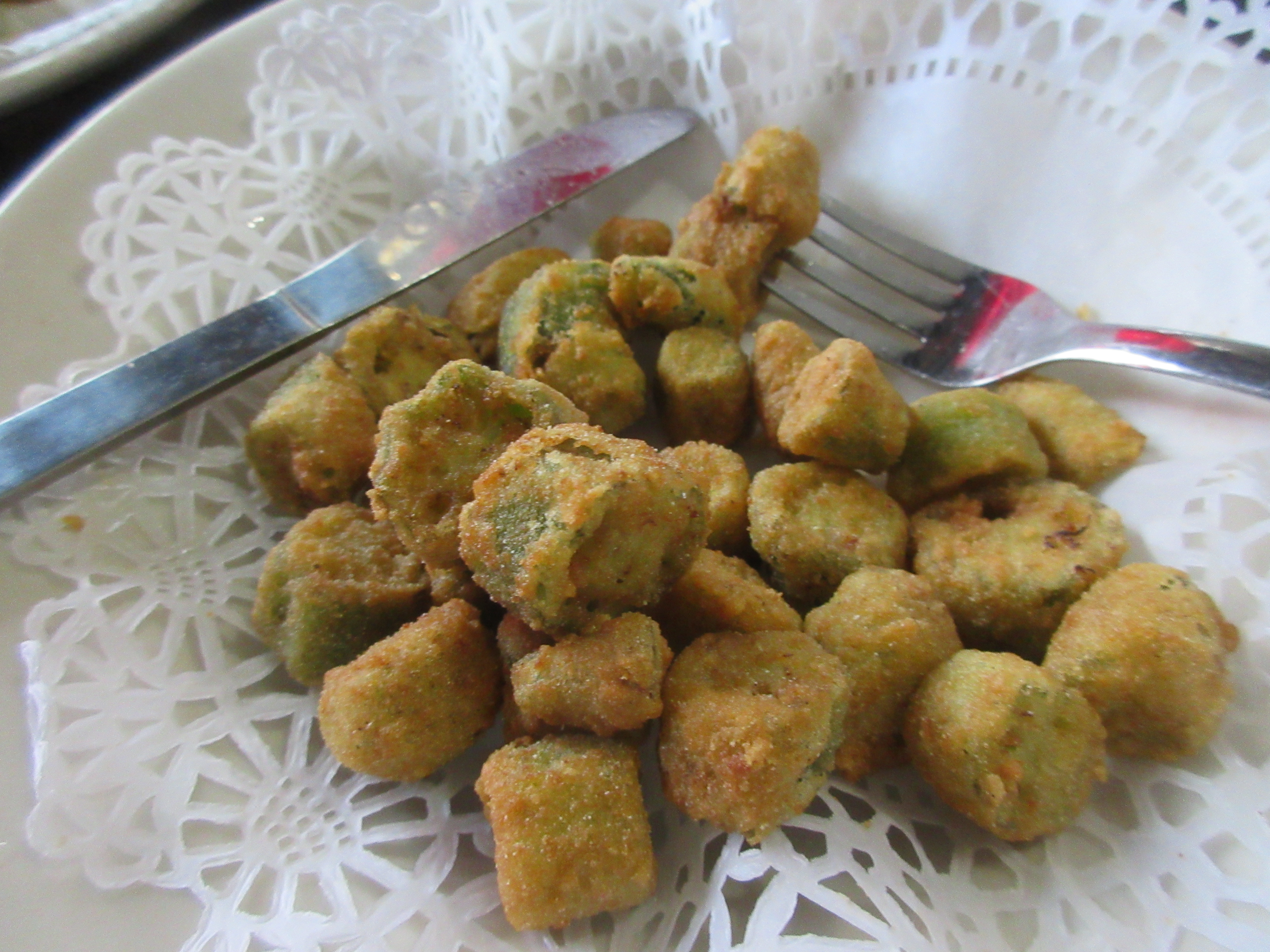
Fried okra

Southern meals sometimes consist only of vegetables, with meat (especially salt pork) used for flavoring in cooking but with no meat dish served. "Beans and greens"—white or brown beans served alongside greens stewed with a small amount of bacon—is a traditional meal in many parts of the South. Turnip greens are the typical greens for such a meal, frequently cooked with some diced turnip and a piece of fatback.

Other low-meat Southern meals include beans and cornbread—the beans being pinto beans stewed with ham or bacon—and Hoppin' John (black-eyed peas, rice, onions, red or green pepper, and bacon).

Cabbage is largely used as the basis of coleslaw, both as a side dish and on a variety of barbecued and fried meats. Sauteéd red cabbage, flavored with vinegar and sugar, is popular in German-influenced areas of the South such as central Texas.

Butternut squash is common in winter, often prepared as a roasted casserole with butter and honey. Other typical vegetable sides include collard greens and congealed salads. Double stuffed potatoes with barbecue pork, cheddar cheese, cream cheese, mayonnaise and chives are served at barbecue restaurants throughout the South.

The tomato sandwich is associated with Southern cuisine and according to Yahoo News is considered an important part of the cuisine. According to Chuck Reece, editor of Georgia Public Radio's Salvation South, the tomato sandwich is "one thing—one perfect thing—about which every Southerner can agree". The New York Times called it "the sandwich southerners wait for all year". Jenn Rice, writing in Garden & Gun, says "The taste of tomato slathered in mayo is such a part of our summer memories that it's practically part of our DNA." Kathleen Purvis of the Charlotte Observer wrote, "Of all the foods that define Southernness, the tomato sandwich may be right up there with grits as the true dividing line." According to Garden & Gun it is "the south's most beloved sandwich".

Though usually considered a snack, boiled peanuts are often sold throughout sports games and roadside stands as a southern favorite. This practice was adapted from West African culture and was recorded as early as 1899. It also has cultural significance drawn from the American Civil War with a song titled “Goober peas” from 1866 that reflected its purpose as a ration food.

=== Rice ===
Country Captain is a regional dish of curry chicken and rice that dates back to at least the 1920s. It became well known after a Columbus, Georgia cook served the dish to then President Franklin D. Roosevelt. George Patton once said "If you can't give me a party and have Country Captain, meet me at the train with a bucket of it."

Red Rice is another staple of Low Country southern cuisine, which is a rice dish simmered in tomato paste, usually cooked with bacon, onion, and other spices.

=== Sweets and pastries ===
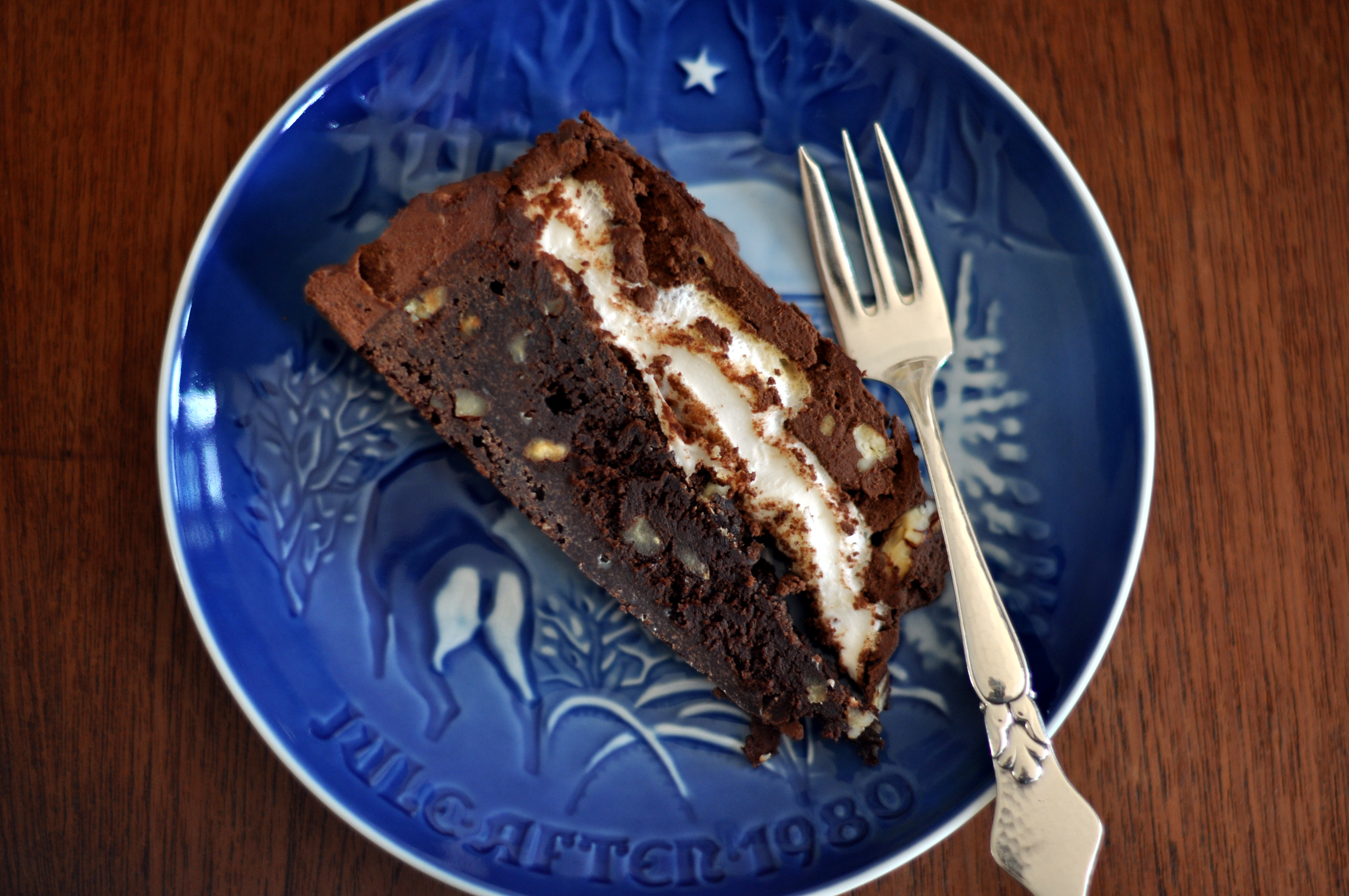
A Mississippi mud pie

Georgia is known for peach cultivation and variations of Peach melba are commonly served as desserts. Chess pie is a traditional pastry made with eggs, butter and sugar or molasses. Bananas foster is a specialty of New Orleans.

=== Seafood ===
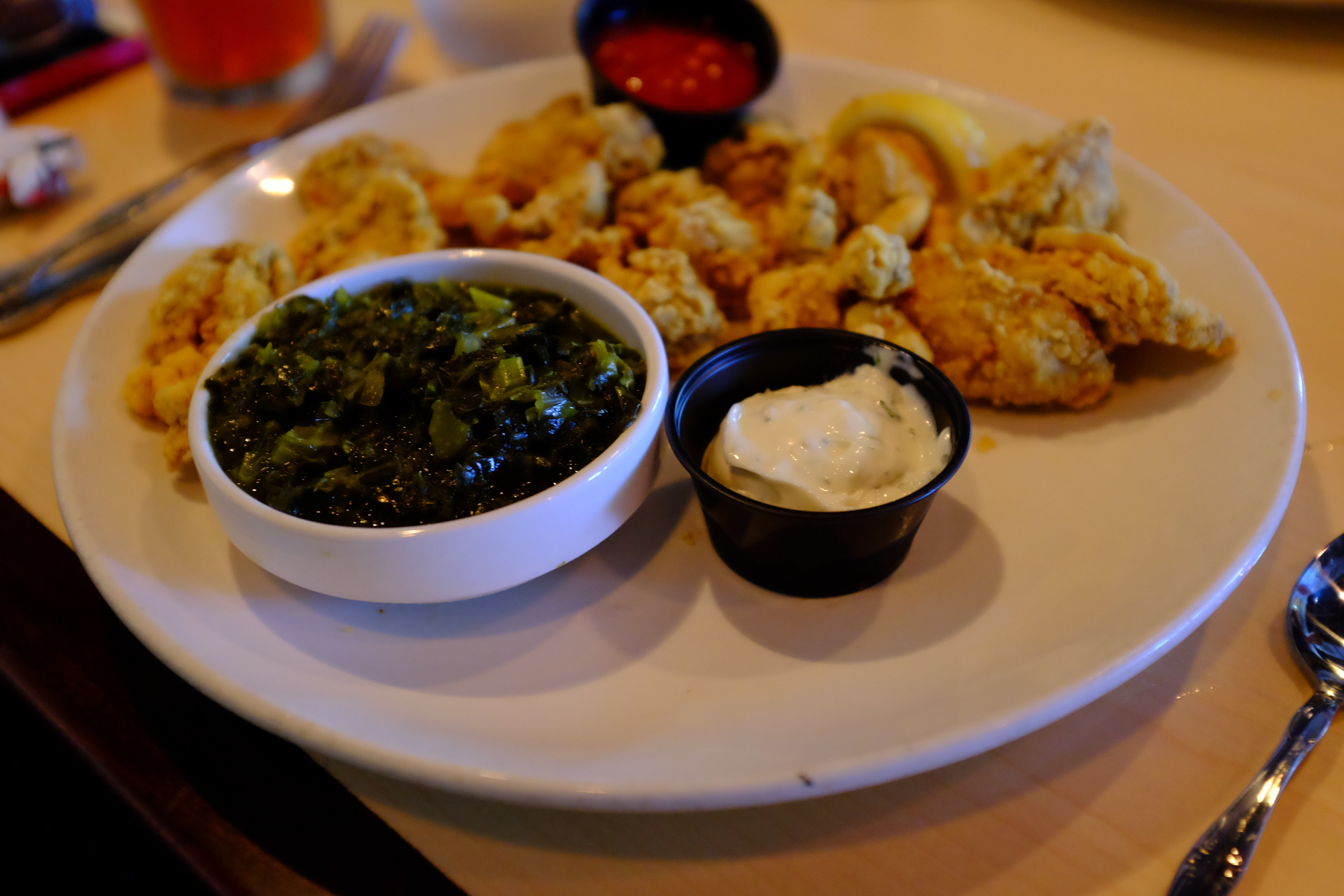
Fried oysters and collard greens

Gulf seafood like black grouper, shrimp and swordfish can be found, and "channel catfish" (Ictalurus punctatus) farmed locally in the Mississippi Delta region is especially popular in Oxford, Mississippi. Fried catfish is commonly served at local establishments with sides. Oysters Rockefeller is a New Orleans specialty, believed to have originated in the state. Creole dishes like gumbo and jambalaya often feature crawfish, oysters, blue crab and shrimp.

== By region ==
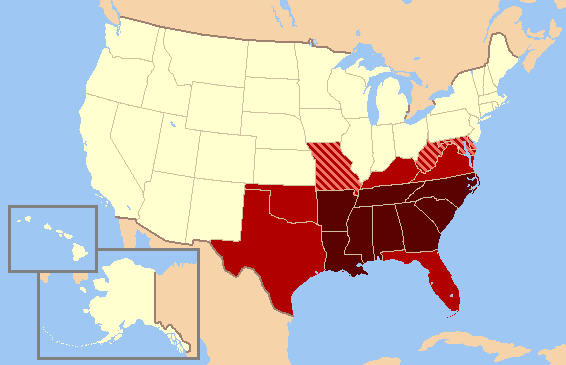
Dark red states considered Southern; medium red usually considered Southern; striped states occasionally considered Southern.

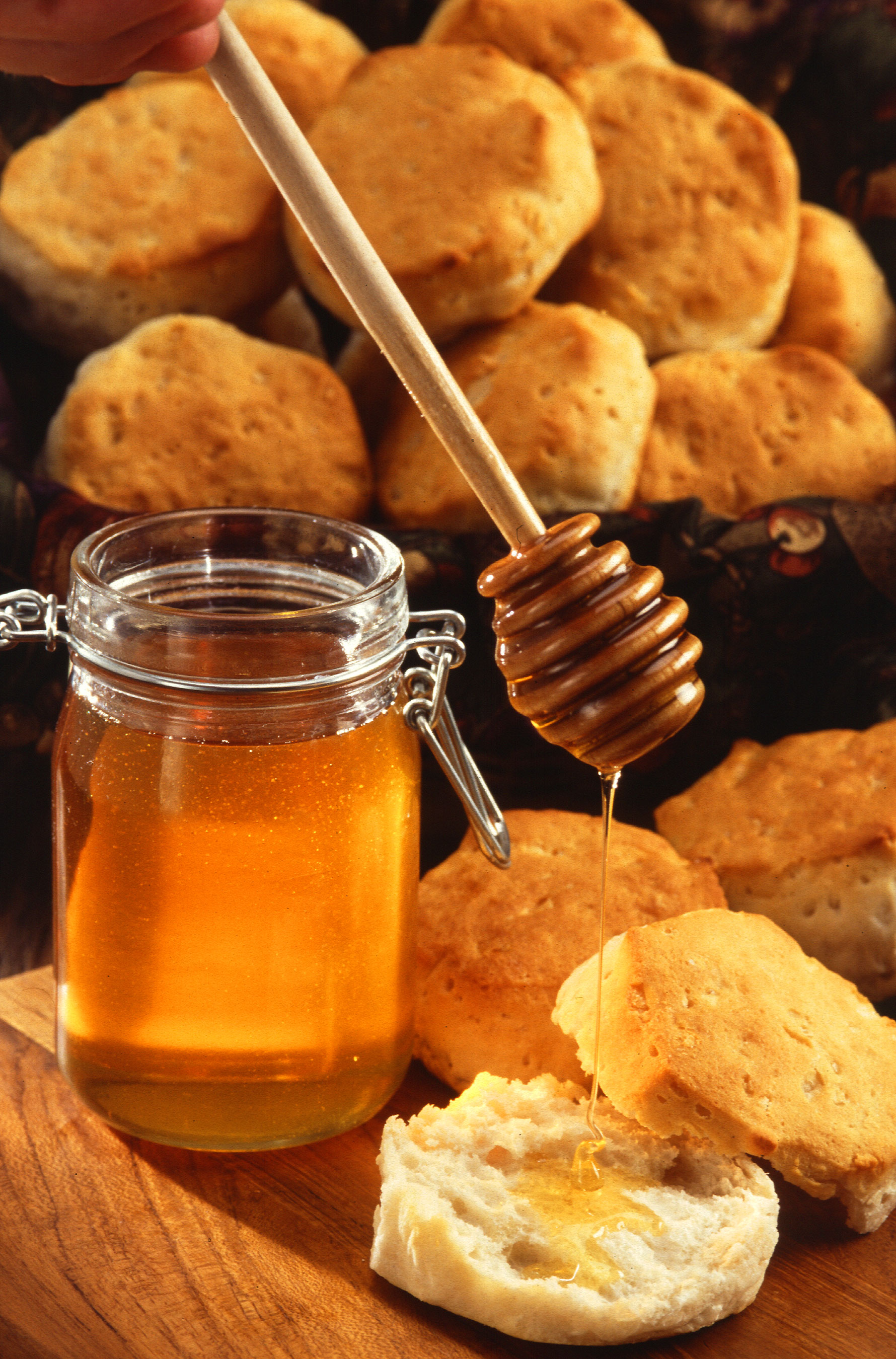
Biscuits with honey

Southern cuisine varies widely by region. Generally speaking:

- Appalachian areas have many ramps (a variety of wild onion) and berries. Appalachia uses butter extensively but makes little use of cheese, and eats more wild game (as well as wild fruits and vegetables) than the rest of the South; apples, oats, and potatoes are also common in Appalachian cuisine, since the mountains are cooler and drier than the lowlands.
- The Upper South favors pork and whiskey; the Low Country (the coast, especially coastal Georgia and coastal South Carolina) favors seafood, rice, and grits.
- Texas and Oklahoma tend to prefer beef; the rest of the South prefers pork.
- Arkansas is the top rice-producing state in the nation. It produces Riceland rice and sweet corn, both of which are staples of the cuisine of Southeastern Arkansas. Arkansas is also noted for catfish, pork barbecue at restaurants, and chicken.
- Florida is home of the Key lime pie and swamp cabbage. Orange juice is the well-known beverage of the state. It has a large beef industry, as well as a seafood industry, and both are reflected in local cuisine. Rock shrimp is beloved on the coast, while beef is common in the state's interior. Due to its long-term economic and trading relationship with the rest of the Caribbean, a particular form of fusion cuisine known as Floribbean cuisine has developed in the state, a fusion of traditional southern food with Caribbean cuisine, often relying on both peppers and fruit to flavor meat dishes.
- Georgia is known for its peaches, pecans, peanuts, and Vidalia onions.
- In Southern Louisiana, there is Cajun and Creole cuisine. Louisiana is the largest supplier of crawfish in the US.
- Kentucky is famous for Burgoo, beer cheese, and the Hot Brown. Kentucky is also known for KFC and fried chicken.
- Maryland and Virginia are known for their blue and soft-shell crabs, and Smith Island Cake.
- Mississippi and Alabama produce the most catfish in the United States.
- Oklahoma has an official state meal which consists of barbecued pork, chicken fried steak, sausage with biscuits and gravy, fried okra, squash, grits, corn, black-eyed peas, corn bread, strawberries and a slice of pecan pie. The state is also known for the fried onion burger and for the popularity of the Coney Island hot dog.
- Carolina-style barbecue is common in North Carolina, South Carolina, and Virginia, and is made traditionally from pulled-pork and a vinegar based sauce.
- Southwest Virginia has a reputation for many grain- and bean-based dishes, such as "cornbread and beans" or the breakfast dish biscuits and gravy. Mississippi specializes in farm-raised catfish, found in traditional "fish houses" throughout the state.
- In the coastal areas of South Carolina, rice was an important crop, leading to local specialties like "Hoppin' John" (a mixture of rice and black-eyed peas flavored with salt pork) and Charleston red rice.
- Tennessee is known for its country ham and Memphis is known for several famous barbecue restaurants and a major barbecue cooking competition held in May. Memphis barbecue usually consists of pork and is distinct for its dry rub. No sauce is applied during the cooking process instead flavor is gained from the rub when cooking. Nashville is known for its famous hot chicken from places like Prince's Hot Chicken Shack, Bolton's Hot Chicken, Hattie B's, and Biscuit Love. Nashville is also home to the restaurant Husk run by world-class chef Sean Brock.
- Texas specializes in barbecue, chili, and Southern cuisine as well as a regional variation of Mexican food unique to Texas called Tex-Mex.
- Virginia produces Smithfield ham and Virginia peanuts. Brunswick stew, which originated in the town of Brunswick, Virginia is also popular. The state's proximity to the Chesapeake Bay and the ideal conditions of the Rappahannock River, makes oysters a popular dish in Virginia, be they served fried, raw, or in a cream-based oyster stew.
- West Virginia is the area where pepperoni rolls are most popular, which typically consists of a white bread roll with pepperoni baked in the middle. The fats in the pepperoni melt into the bread, giving the bread an extra dimension of flavor. Other ingredients are sometimes added, such as cheese, peppers, or melted butter on top. The state also has Tudor's Biscuit World restaurants specializing in biscuits and sausage gravy.

=== Louisiana Creole cuisine ===
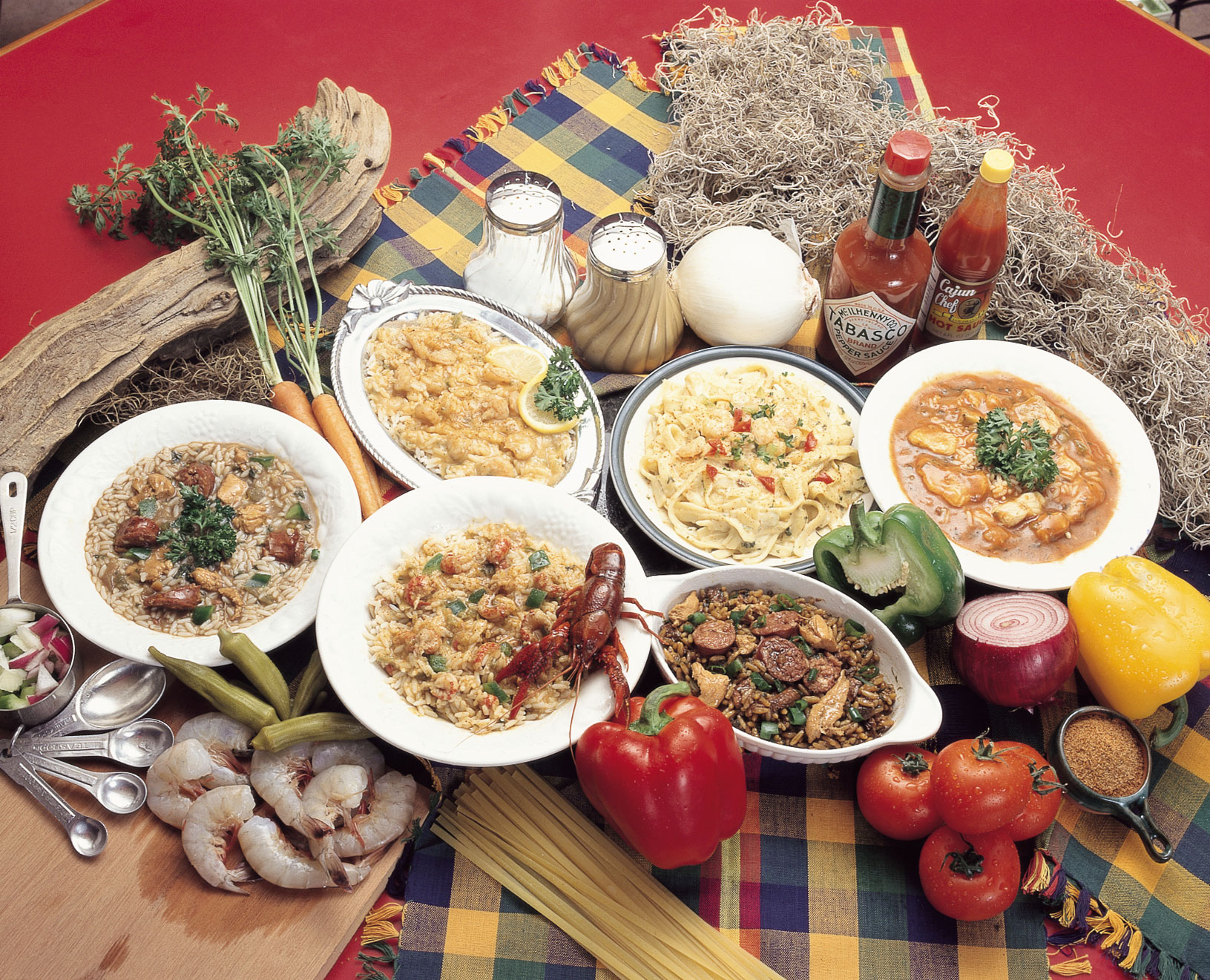
Dishes typical of Louisiana Creole cuisine

Southern Louisiana is geographically part of the South, but its cuisine is probably best understood as having only mild Southern influences. Creole cuisine makes good use of many coastal animals—crawfish (commonly called crayfish outside the region), crab, oysters, shrimp, and saltwater fish. Mirliton (chayote squash), is popular in Louisiana. Coffee blended with Chicory is sometimes preferred over pure ground—especially as an accompaniment to beignets.

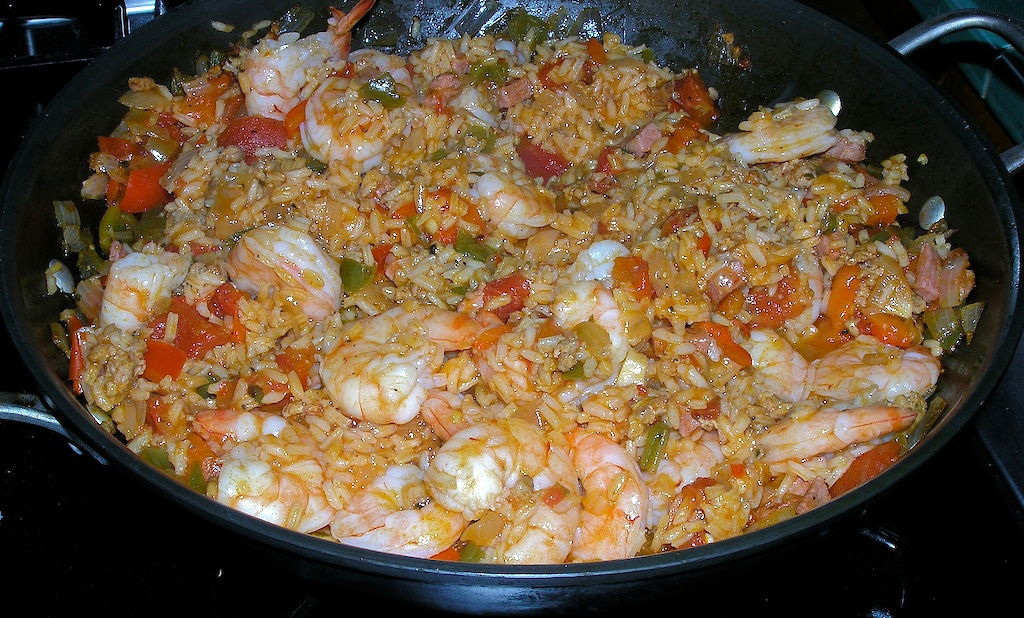
Jambalaya is a popular Louisiana-origin dish of Spanish, French (especially Provençal cuisine), and West African influence.

=== Lowcountry cuisine ===
The Lowcountry region of the coastal Carolinas and Georgia shares many of the same food resources as the Upper Gulf Coast: fish, shrimp, oysters, rice, and okra. It also displays some similarities to Creole and Cajun cuisines.

=== Appalachian cuisine ===
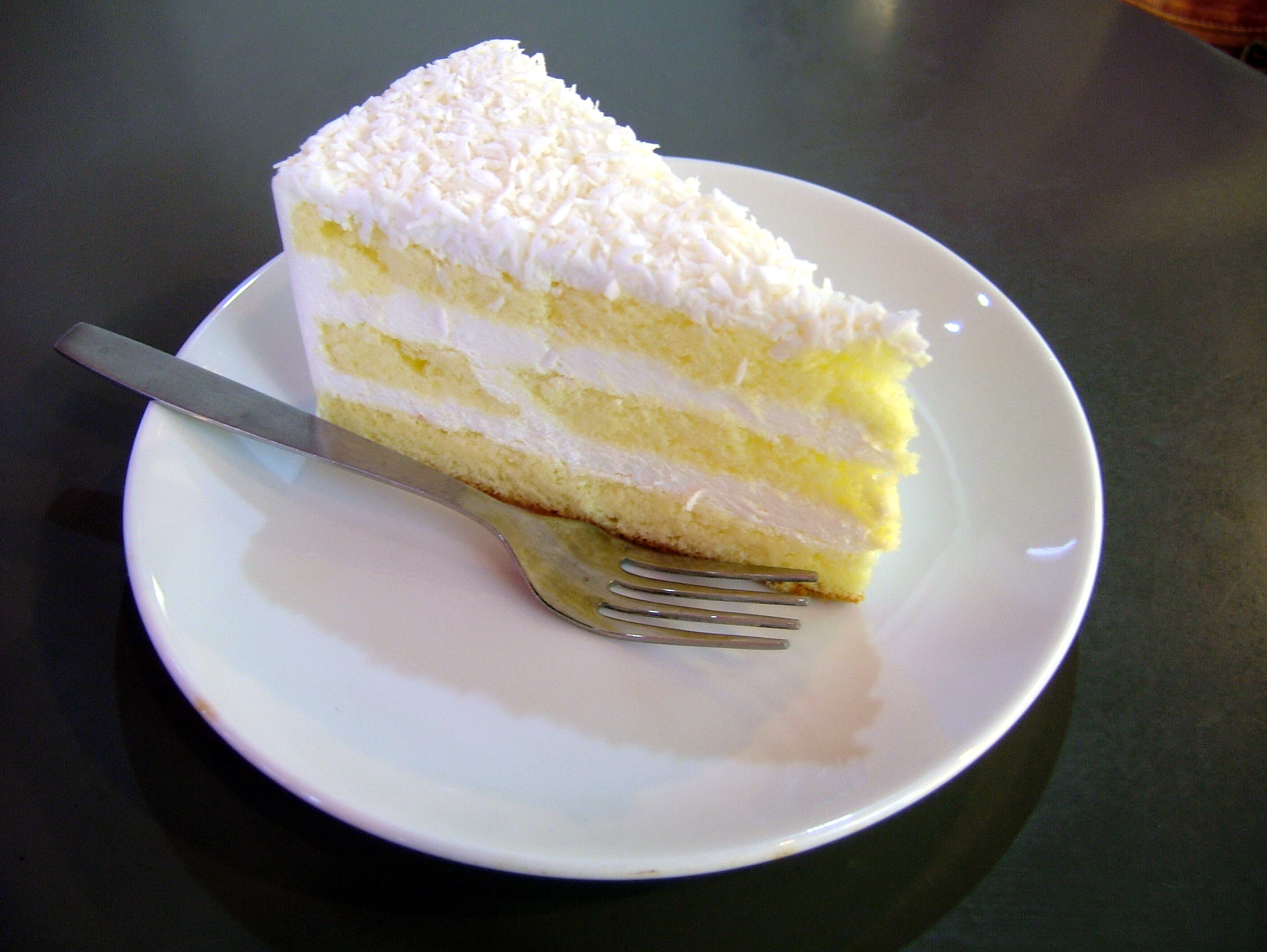
A slice of coconut cream cake

Because of its geographic location, Appalachia cuisine offers a wide range of ingredients and products that can be transformed using traditional methods and contemporary applications. Staples of Appalachian cuisine that are common in other regional cuisines of the south include coconut cream cake, peanut brittle, sweet potato casserole, pork chops, biscuits and gravy, and chicken and dumplings. Basic soul food dishes like collard greens, hominy, cracklings and ham hocks are also common to the Appalachian kitchen.

European fruits—especially apples and pears—can grow in the mountains, and sweet fried apples are a common side dish. Appalachian cuisine also makes use of berries, both native and European, and some parts of the mountains are high enough or far enough north that sugar maple grows there—allowing for maple syrup and maple sugar production. Wild morel mushrooms and ramps (similar to scallions and leeks) are often collected; there are even festivals dedicated to ramps, and they figure in some Appalachian fairy tales. The diet included corn, beans, squash, mixed pickles, milk, cheeses, butter, cream, tea, and coffee.

Salt, a necessity for life, was always available (much of it coming from Saltville, Virginia), and local seasonings like spicebush were certainly known and used; but the only other seasonings used in the mountains are black pepper and flaked red pepper, along with a little use of cinnamon, nutmeg, and cloves around Christmas. Gunpowder seasoning is also popular in the Appalachian region, often made from activated charcoal, dehydrated onion and garlic, paprika, salt, sugar, corn starch, and sunflower oil. Its ‘smoky’ flavor is commonly used as a dry rub, making it perfect for regional game as well as a variety of grilled vegetables such as bell peppers, white onion, and yellow squash.

Coffee, drunk without milk and only lightly sweetened, is a basic drink in Appalachia, often consumed with every meal; in wartime, chicory was widely used as a coffee substitute.

Rice and cane sugar, grown further south, were not easy to come by in Appalachia and generally sorghum, honey and maple syrup were used as sweetener in local dishes. Travel distances, conditions, and poor roads limited most early settlements to foods that could be grown or produced locally.

For farmers, pigs and chickens were the primary source of meat, with many farmers maintaining their own smokehouses to produce a variety of hams, bacon, and sausages. Seafood, beyond the occasionally locally caught fresh-water fish (pan-fried catfish is much loved, as is trout in the mountains of western North Carolina, East Tennessee, and Southwest Virginia) and crawfish, were unavailable until modern times.

However, Appalachia did offer a wide variety of wild game, with venison, rabbit and squirrel particularly common, thus helping to compensate for distance from major cities and transportation networks. The popularity of hunting and fishing in Appalachia means that game and fresh-water fish were often staples of the table. Deer, wild turkey, grouse and other game birds are hunted and utilized in many recipes from barbecue to curing and jerky.

Home canning, of both garden and foraged foods, is a strong tradition in Appalachia as well; mason jars are an everyday sight in mountain life; the most common canned foods are savory vegetables: green beans (half-runners, snaps), shelly beans (green beans that were more mature and had ripe beans along with the green husks), and tomatoes, as well as jam, jelly and local fruits.

Dried pinto beans are a major staple food during the winter months, used to make the ubiquitous ham-flavored bean soup usually called soup beans. Kieffer pears and apple varietals are used to make pear butter and apple butter.

Also popular are bread and butter pickles, fried mustard greens with vinegar, pickled beets, chow-chow (commonly called "chow"), a relish known as corn ketchup and fried green tomatoes; tomatoes are also used in tomato gravy, a variant of sausage gravy with a thinner, lighter roux. A variety of wild fruits like pawpaws, wild blackberries, and persimmons are also commonly available in Appalachia as well.

The gravy for biscuits and gravy is typically sausage or sawmill, not the red-eye gravy (made with coffee) used in the lowland South. Pork drippings from frying sausage, bacon, and other types of pan-fried pork are collected and saved, used for making gravy and in greasing cast-iron cookware. (Appalachia is overwhelmingly Protestant, the Catholic prohibition on meat-eating during Lent had no impact on Appalachian cuisine.)

Chicken and dumplings and fried chicken remain much-loved dishes. Cornbread, corn pone, hominy grits, mush, cornbread pudding and hominy stew are also quite common foods, as corn is the primary grain grown in the Appalachian hills and mountains, but are less common than in the past.

== Notable cookbooks ==
- The Taste of Country Cooking (1976) by Edna Lewis

== See also ==
- Bahamian cuisine
- Barbecue
- Cuisine of the Southwestern United States
- Cuisine of the United States
- Liberian cuisine
- List of foods of the Southern United States
- Soul food
- Southern Food and Beverage Museum
- Tex-Mex cuisine
- Memphis-style barbecue
- Texan cuisine
- Cuisine of New Orleans
- Cuisine of Kentucky
- Cuisine of Houston
- Cuisine of Atlanta
