= List of companies based in Nashville, Tennessee =

Many significant companies are based in Nashville, Tennessee, and its surrounding communities in the Nashville metropolitan area. Five of the companies, HCA Healthcare, Dollar General, Community Health Systems, Delek US Holdings, and Tractor Supply, were members of the Fortune 500 in 2020, ranking 65th, 112th, 241st, 342nd, and 380th respectively.

== Companies in Nashville ==
- 247Sports
- Abingdon Press
- AllianceBernstein
- American Economic Association
- AMG/Parade
- Arrangers' Publishing Company
- Asurion
- Back Yard Burgers
- Baldwin Piano Company
- BillFixers
- Biscuit Love
- Bridgestone Americas Holding (Bridgestone-Firestone)
- Broken Bow Records
- Captain D's
- Caterpillar Financial Services Corporation (finance arm of Caterpillar Inc.)
- Central Parking Corporation
- Chādy Property Management
- Cokesbury
- Country Music Television
- Credential Recordings
- Curb Records
- Firestone Tire and Rubber Company
- The General
- Genesco
- Gibson Guitar Corporation
- Great American Country
- Gruhn Guitars
- Harrow Health
- Hattie B's Hot Chicken
- HCA Holdings, Inc.
- Hospital Corporation of America
- iHeart Media
- Informatics Corporation of America
- Ingram Barge Company
- Ingram Industries
- Innovative Hearth Products
- J. Alexander's
- Jerry Jones Guitars
- Lifepoint Hospitals
- LifeWay Christian Resources
- Louisiana-Pacific Corp.
- Nashville Brewing Company
- O'Charley's
- Oreck Corporation
- Pinnacle Financial
- Purity Dairies
- Randall House Publications
- Ryman Hospitality Properties
- SESAC
- Shield Health
- Shoney's
- SMS Holdings
- Social Link
- Southwestern family of companies
- Stoney River
- Sun Records
- Thomas Nelson Publishing
- Total Nonstop Action Wrestling
- Universal Lighting Technologies
- Universal Logic
- Universal Music Group Nashville
- Vanderbilt University & Medical Center
- Vanguard Health Systems
- Word Records
- Yazoo Brewing Company

== Companies in the metro area ==
- Acadia Healthcare Company Inc in Franklin
- Brookdale Senior Living in Brentwood
- CKE Restaurants in Franklin
- Community Health Systems in Franklin
- Contour Airlines in Smyrna
- CoreCivic in Brentwood
- Cracker Barrel in Lebanon
- Delek US Holdings in Brentwood
- Dollar General in Goodlettsville
- Healthways in Franklin
- Iasis Healthcare in Franklin
- The ICEE Company
- Ingram Content Group in La Vergne
- Kaiser Aluminum
- Kirkland's in Brentwood
- Mars Petcare in Franklin
- Mitsubishi Motors in Franklin
- MyOutdoorTV.com in Franklin
- Nissan North America in Franklin
- OHL in Brentwood
- Old Time Pottery in Murfreesboro
- Servpro Industries in Gallatin
- Singer Corporation in La Vergne
- Tractor Supply Company in Brentwood
- Triangle Group in Franklin

== Companies with a strong presence ==
- Altegrity
- Amazon
- American Society of Composers, Authors and Publishers
- AT&T
- Bank of America
- Broadcast Music, Inc.
- Dell
- Deloitte
- Fifth Third Bank
- First Tennessee
- The Kroger Company
- Lyft
- Oracle
- Randstad NV
- Regions Financial Corporation
- Schneider Electric
- Sony
- State Farm Insurance
- Truist Financial
- U.S. Bank
- Verizon Wireless
