= Peter Kurland =

American production sound mixer (born 1958)

- Born: Peter Franklin Kurland; 1958 (age 67–68)
- Occupation: Sound engineer
- Years active: 1984 – present
- Spouse: Shannon Dee Wood (2 children)

Peter Franklin Kurland (born 1958) is an American production sound mixer.

Kurland has done boom operation work along with sound mixing on many films, such as Walk the Line, The Ladykillers, Intolerable Cruelty, Men in Black, Wild Wild West, and O Brother, Where Art Thou?. He won two Grammy's for O Brother, Where Art Thou?, a BAFTA award and a CAS award for Walk the Line, and was nominated for the Academy Award for Best Sound Mixing for Walk the Line.

In 2008, he won the CAS award for No Country for Old Men, which was nominated for the Academy Award for Best Sound Mixing as well as the BAFTA award. In 2011, he won the CAS award and was nominated for the BAFTA, and the Best Sound Oscar, this time for the film True Grit.

Kurland is a frequent collaborator with the Coen Brothers, working on every Coen Brothers' film for the past 25 years.

Kurland and his wife, Shannon Wood, are co-owners of the Darkhorse Theater, a performing arts venue in Nashville.

In 2014, he was nominated for the CAS award, the BAFTA award and the Academy Award for Best Sound Mixing for Inside Llewyn Davis.

He resigned his membership of the Academy of Motion Picture Arts and Sciences (AMPAS) on 23 March 2022 citing changes to the broadcast of the 94th Academy Awards Ceremony where 8 Categories including Best Sound were not presented live but rather during the commercial breaks.

== Personal life ==
Kurland is the son of violinist and musical arranger Sheldon Kurland. He attended Peabody Demonstration School (now University School of Nashville) in Nashville, Tennessee. He is a graduate of Antioch College, where he was once the fire chief. He is married to Shannon Dee Wood, with whom he has two children. Wood was an unsuccessful candidate for the Democratic nomination to the United States Senate in 2000, when Bill Frist won re-election. His sons, Julian and Ben, are the founders of BillFixers.
