= Jean-Paul Linnartz =

Dutch electrical engineer

- Jean-Paul Linnartz (2017)

Johan Paul Marie Gerard (Jean-Paul) Linnartz is a Dutch electrical engineer, scientist, and professor at Eindhoven University of Technology. He is internationally recognized as an expert in the field of data security against noise-induced interference. By the end of 2025, his papers on digital watermarking, anonymous biometrics, radio communication, and optical wireless communication had been cited over 13,000 times.

== Career ==
Linnartz obtained his engineering degree in electrical engineering from Eindhoven University of Technology (TU/e) in 1986, specializing in digital communication systems. He began his career as a researcher at TNO in The Hague (1987–1988). Subsequently, from 1988 to 1991, he was an assistant professor of electrical engineering at Delft University of Technology, where he earned his PhD in 1991 with a thesis on traffic analysis in wireless networks. From 1991 to 1993, he held the position of assistant professor at the University of California, Berkeley. In 1993, he introduced Multi-carrier code-division multiple access (Multi-Carrier CDMA). From 1994 to 1995, he served as an associate professor at TU Delft.

From 1995 to 2007, he worked at Philips Research in Eindhoven, where he started as a researcher and later held positions as principal researcher, group leader, and director. From 2006 onwards, he also served as a senior technical director at Philips Research. He led research teams focused on information security, wireless connectivity, and integrated circuit design.

He has been a professor in the Signal Processing Systems group at TU/e since 2006. At Signify (formerly Philips Lighting), Linnartz led research into Li-Fi — a wireless internet connection based on LEDs — until 2024.

Linnartz holds more than 75 patents, which formed the basis for three successful companies.

== Recognition ==
Recipient Veder Prize Netherlands Electronics and Radio Society, 1991.

He is Life Fellow of the Institute of Electrical and Electronics Engineers (IEEE).
