= Biscuit Love =

American restaurant chain

- Company type: Private
- Industry: Fast casual restaurant
- Founded: 2012 in Nashville, TN
- Founders: Karl Worley; Sarah Worley
- Number of locations: 3
- Area served: Nashville, TN; Franklin, TN
- Products: Breakfast; Lunch; Brunch
- Website: biscuitlove.com

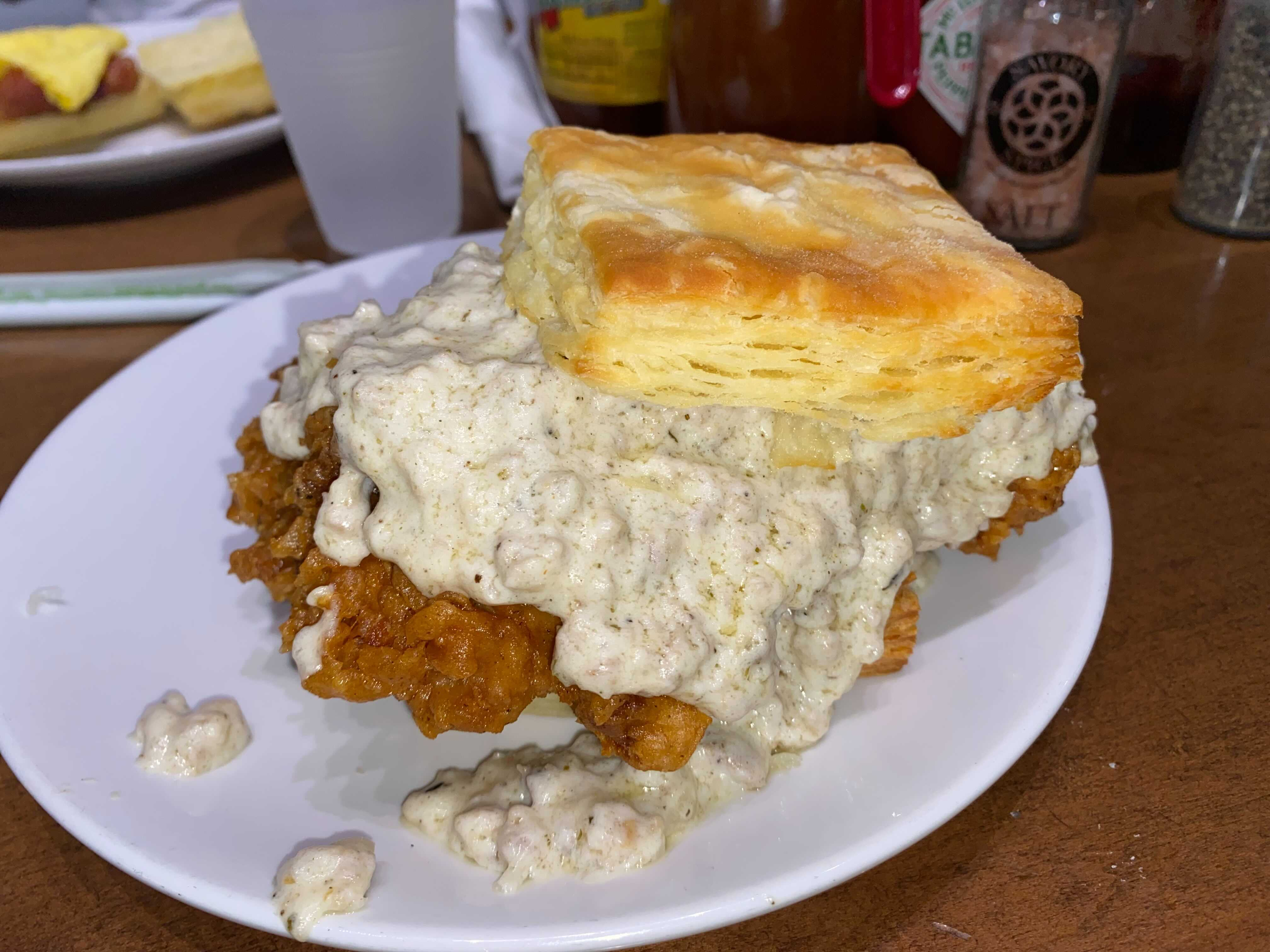
Biscuit with fried chicken thigh & sausage gravy at Biscuit Love in Nashville, TN

Biscuit Love is an American restaurant chain in Nashville, Tennessee founded by husband and wife team, Karl and Sarah Worley. The company specializes in southern-inspired breakfast and lunch dishes that are locally sourced and made from scratch.

== Overview ==
After attending culinary school together at Johnson & Wales University, Karl and Sarah Worley initially opened Biscuit Love as a food truck in the spring of 2012 with just three items on the menu. The food truck gained a devoted following and widespread acclaim, and the Worleys opened their first brick and mortar location in The Gulch neighborhood of Nashville in January 2015 under a new partnership with Fresh Hospitality, a restaurant investment group. This new location featured an expanded menu with a wide variety of southern-inspired breakfast and lunch dishes.

In June 2017, Biscuit Love opened a second location in Nashville’s Hillsboro Village neighborhood.

In January 2018, a third location was added in the historic downtown section of Franklin, Tennessee.

In August 2019, Karl and Sarah Worley opened a new restaurant called ‘Za Wood-fired Pizza in the same building as their Hillsboro Village location of Biscuit Love.

== Reception ==
The flagship Biscuit Love location in The Gulch has become a popular attraction for locals and tourists alike, with lines regularly extending out the main door and down the block.

In 2015, Biscuit Love won Andrew Zimmern's “Munchies: People’s Choice Food Award” for Best Food Truck. Later that year, the East Nasty was named “Best Sandwich of 2015” by Bon Appétit. In 2016, Food Network star Alton Brown said that Biscuit Love’s shrimp and grits were the best he had ever eaten.

== See also ==
- List of casual dining restaurant chains
- List of companies based in Nashville, Tennessee
- Cuisine of the Southern United States
