= Prince's Hot Chicken Shack =

Restaurant in Nashville, Tennessee, US

Coordinates: 36.2299°N 86.7608°W

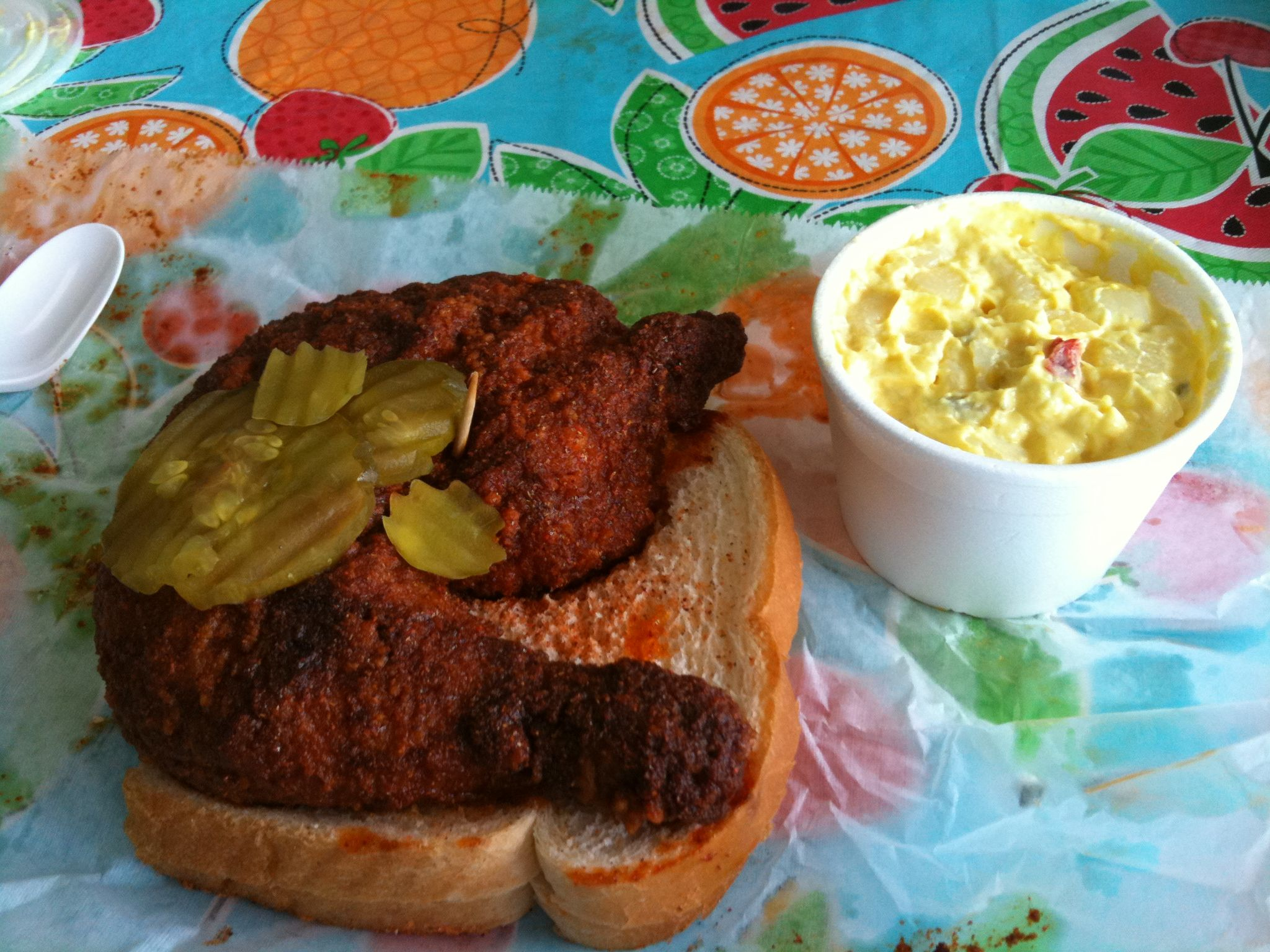
- Prince's hot chicken sandwich
- Type: Private
- Industry: Fast casual restaurant
- Founded: 1945; 81 years ago in Nashville, Tennessee, United States
- Founder: James Thornton Prince
- Number of locations: 4
- Area served: Middle Tennessee
- Products: Hot chicken Fried chicken Side dishes
- Owner: André Prince Jeffries
- Website: princeshotchicken.com

Prince's Hot Chicken Shack is a restaurant located in Nashville, Tennessee’s Assembly Food Hall, known for its hot chicken, and is credited with popularizing the dish and inspiring restaurants with similar offerings. The business was started in 1945 by James Thornton Prince, and in 1980 ownership was passed to his great-niece André Prince Jeffries.

== History ==
While impossible to verify, the development of hot chicken is reportedly accidental. Prince was purportedly a womanizer, and after a particularly late night his girlfriend at the time cooked him a fried chicken breakfast with hot pepper as revenge. Prince, however, liked the taste so much that he and his brothers created their own recipe and opened the Bar-B-Que Chicken Shack.

The café was originally located at 28th Ave. and Jefferson St., but moved downtown into Hell's Half Acre and close to the Ryman Auditorium, home of the Grand Ole Opry. In its heyday, the Opry stars were headed there after every performance. With the atmosphere of segregation and being a favorite of the Opry's stars, a separate room was built for white guests. Whites walked through the main dining room and the kitchen to reach the separate room at the back of the building. It moved to its East Nashville location on Ewing Dr. in 1988.

When Thornton Prince died, his brother Will took over. His wife Maude ran the business when he passed. In 1980, Maude decided that Thornton's great-niece André Prince Jeffries should take over Prince's. Jeffries renamed the restaurant by taking out the BBQ in the name.

In December 2018, a Ford Explorer crashed into the strip mall housing a Prince's location on Ewing Drive, setting it on fire. While the restaurant itself was undamaged and Prince Jeffries initially believed that it would be closed for only two weeks, extensive damage to the building and the landlord's delays in securing repairs led her to announce a permanent closure seven months later. The location had been operating since 1989.

== Honors and awards ==
The Travel Channel show Food Paradise has named Prince's as Nashville's best place to get hot chicken (2013-02-06 episode). They were also on the network's Bizarre Foods America (2014-04-07 episode) and Man v. Food Nation (2011-06-08 episode). Gourmet magazine named it as one of Nashville's four "don't-miss dining experiences". In 2013, they were named an American Classic by the James Beard Foundation Awards. The Daily Meal ranked it seventh in its 2017 list of America's 75 Best Fried Chicken Spots.

== See also ==
- List of chicken restaurants
- List of companies based in Nashville, Tennessee
