= MC-CDMA =

MC-CDMA may stand for:

- Multi-carrier code-division multiple access, a multiple access technology used in telecommunication systems based on OFDM.
- A variant of the mobile communication standard CDMA2000, where three or more pairs of 1.25 MHz radio channels are used together so that higher data rates can be achieved.
