= Hattie B's Hot Chicken =

U.S. chain of hot chicken restaurants

- Type: Private
- Industry: Fast casual restaurant
- Founded: 2012; 14 years ago in Nashville, Tennessee, United States
- Founders: Nick Bishop, Jr. Nick Bishop, Sr.
- Number of locations: 16
- Area served: Tennessee; Central Alabama; Metro Atlanta; Dallas; Las Vegas; Chicago
- Products: Hot chicken Fried chicken Side dishes Desserts
- Website: hattieb.com

Hattie B's Hot Chicken is an American restaurant chain based in Nashville, Tennessee, founded by a father and son, both named Nick Bishop. The company specializes in hot chicken, a fried chicken dish, and operates several restaurants in the Southern and Midwestern United States.

== Overview ==
The restaurant is named after three women in the Bishop family with the name Hattie. The company purveys hot chicken, a local specialty and signature dish of Nashville, chicken and waffles, side dishes, desserts and other foods. The chicken is provided at various spice levels. The spiciest version of the hot chicken has been described as having a very marked, severe spiciness, and is prepared using ghost peppers as an ingredient. The chicken is served with pickles and atop white bread, as per traditional local preparation methods.

The original Hattie B's Hot Chicken opened in Midtown Nashville on August 9, 2012. A second location opened in June 2014 in West Nashville, a location in Birmingham, Alabama, opened in June 2016, and a third Nashville location opened in November 2017. A new location was opened in Midtown Memphis in April 2018. An Atlanta, Georgia, location opened in July 2018. In the fall of 2018, a location opened inside The Cosmopolitan in Las Vegas, Nevada. An additional location was opened in Dallas, Texas, in February 2022. In 2026, their first Midwestern location opened in Chicago's Wrigleyville neighborhood, with plans for two additional locations (in Wicker Park and River North) also in the works. It is a privately held, family-owned company.

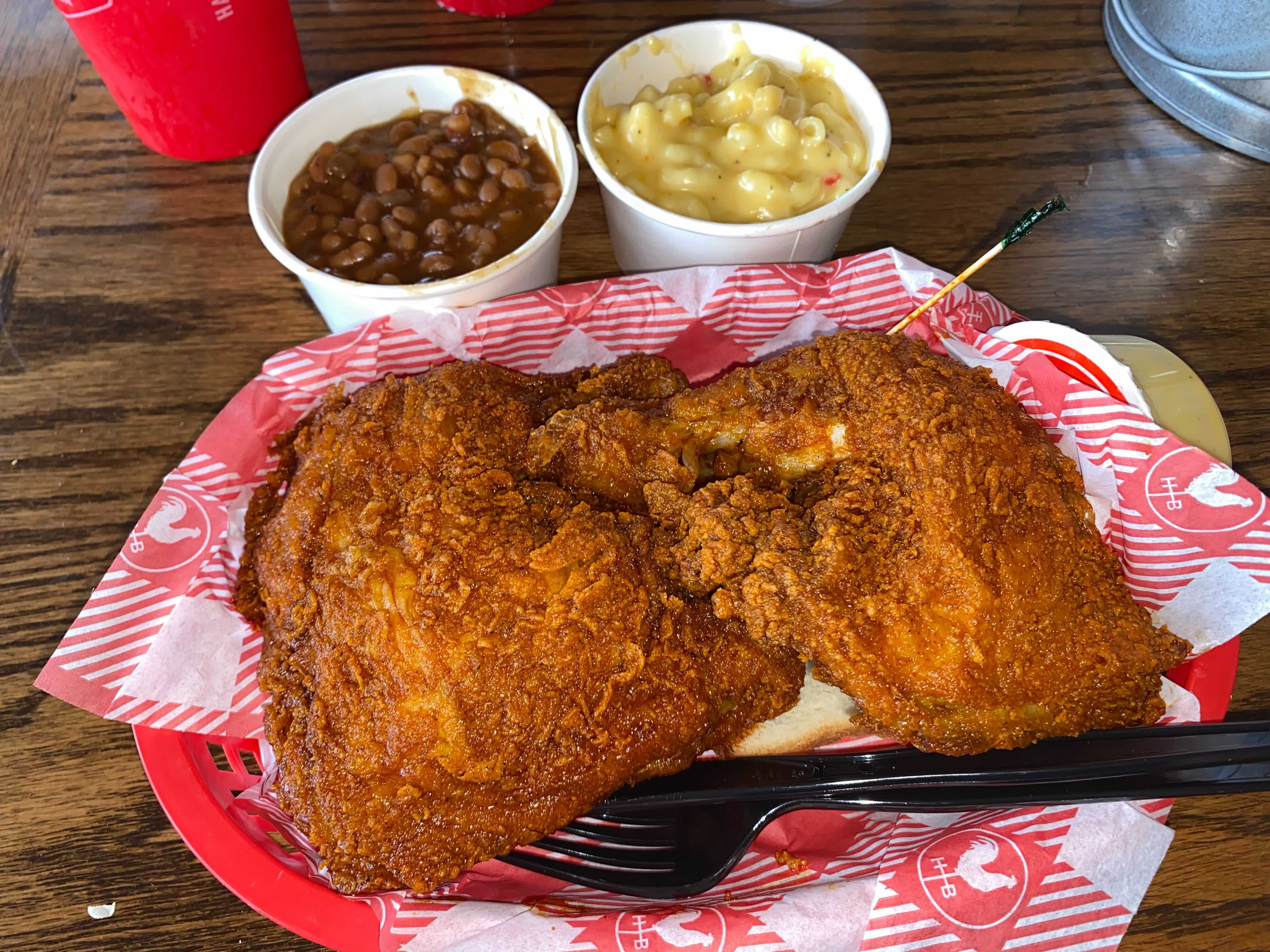
Half-chicken (dark meat) at Hattie B's with side of baked beans and mac & cheese

== Reception ==
Columnists in USA Today and Sports Illustrated reviewed the restaurant in 2017. In 2017, it was ranked sixth on The Daily Meal's list of America's 75 Best Fried Chicken Spots.

== See also ==
- List of chicken restaurants
- List of companies based in Nashville, Tennessee
