= Innovative Hearth Products =

Fireplace manufacturer

Innovative Hearth Products (IHP) designs and manufactures a wide variety of fireplaces and fireplace accessories within 4 separate brands: Astria Fireplaces, IronStrike Stoves & Inserts, Superior Fireplaces, and Comfort Flame.

== Growth ==
Lennox Hearth Products, which was established in 1994 by Lennox International, acquired Whitfield Hearth Products, Superior Fireplace Company and Marco Manufacturing in 1998; Earth Stove and Security Chimneys in 1999; then Country Stoves in 2006. In September 2012, Lennox Hearth Products merged with FMI Products to form Innovative Hearth Products (IHP).

== Products ==
IHP deals in focused markets such as industrial, residential new construction, and specialty retail. Their products are available in both the United States and Canada through various distributors and specialty hearth dealers. Their product lines include gas, electric, and wood fireplaces for both indoor and outdoor settings. They also produce additional products and accessories such as fireplace inserts, free-standing stoves, gas log sets, and venting products.

== Facilities ==
IHP is based in Nashville, Tennessee USA with factories in Russellville, Alabama USA, and Auburn, Washington USA.
