= Universal Lighting Technologies =

Commercial lighting manufacturer

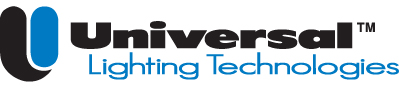
- Industry: Electrical ballast manufacturing
- Founded: 1947
- Headquarters: Nashville, Tennessee, United States
- Products: Lighting & Lighting Controls
- Number of employees: 2,330 (2011)
- Parent: Atar Capital

Universal Lighting Technologies, Inc. was a commercial lighting manufacturer founded in 1947 and based in Nashville, Tennessee and was shut down in 2023. In 2021, Atar Capital bought Panasonic’s American Lighting Division, which included Universal Lighting Technologies, Inc. as well as Douglas Lighting Controls, and reincorporated it as Universal Douglas Lighting Americas, Inc.(UDLA). In March of 2023, Atar Capital abruptly shut down UDLA, citing disruption due to the Covid-19 pandemic. UDLA primarily designed and manufactured light-emitting diode (LED) ballasts and controllers.

In October 2023, Signify N.V. acquired assets from Universal Douglas subsidiaries Douglas Lighting Controls and Universal Lighting Technologies.
