= Signify N.V. =

Dutch multinational lighting company

- Formerly: Philips Lighting N.V. (2016–2018)
- Type: Naamloze vennootschap
- Traded as: Euronext Amsterdam: LIGHT; AEX component
- Industry: Lighting
- Predecessor: Philips' lighting division
- Founded: 3 May 2016; 10 years ago
- Headquarters: Eindhoven, Netherlands
- Area served: Worldwide
- Key people: As Tempelman (Chairman, CEO)
- Products: Electric lights; Light fixtures
- Revenue: ▼€6.14 billion (2024)
- Operating income: ▲€0.48 billion (2024)
- Net income: ▲€0.33 billion (2024)
- Total assets: ▼€7.51 billion (2024)
- Total equity: ▲€3.16 billion (2024)
- Number of employees: 30,819 (2024)
- Subsidiaries: Cooper Lighting, Fluence, Telensa, Pierlite, Zhejiang Klite Lighting, Once and iLox, WiZ Connected, Shenzhen LiteMagic Technologies, Vari-Lite
- Website: signify.com

Signify N.V., formerly known as Philips Lighting N.V., is a Dutch multinational lighting corporation formed in 2016 as a result of the spin-off of the lighting division of Philips, by means of an IPO. The company manufactures electric lights, light fixtures and control systems for consumers, professionals and the IoT. In 2018, Philips Lighting changed its name to Signify. The company still produces lights under the Philips brand.

== History ==
The Lighting division was part of the first activities of Philips, that started in 1891 with an incandescent lamp factory in Eindhoven, the Netherlands.

In September 2014, Philips announced that the company intended to split the company into two market-leading entities, one focused on health and medical technology and the other on connected LED lighting.

On 3 May 2016, Philips announced the formation of the separated company called Philips Lighting N.V.. Philips stated that the main reason for the demerger was that the medical technology business accounted for more than 40% of sales, while its lighting arm remained a major money-spinner, selling products in 180 countries. The separated entity had an initial public offering on 27 May 2016, valued at US$3.4 billion; 25% of the shares were offered. The company listed on Euronext Amsterdam under ticker code "LIGHT".

In March 2018, Philips Lighting announced that the company would change its name to Signify, which became effective on 16 May 2018. However, Signify continued to produce some of its lighting products under the Philips brand.

On 16 April 2019, Signify acquired the Hong Kong–based Wi-Fi connected lighting provider, WiZ Connected, for an undisclosed amount.

On 2 March 2020, Eaton sold its lighting business, Cooper Lighting Solutions, to Signify for $1.4 billion.

In July 2021, Signify acquired the UK-based company Telensa, a smart street lighting controls company.

On 20 December 2021, Signify announced it has entered a final agreement with AMS Osram to acquire horticulture lighting company Fluence for $272 million, and the deal was completed in May 2022.

In October 2023, Signify acquired assets from Universal Douglas subsidiaries Douglas Lighting Controls and Universal Lighting Technologies.

== Products ==
Signify manufactures lighting-related products, mainly under the Philips brand (used under license), but also as Philips Hue, Color Kinetics, WiZ and ecolink among others. Signify's portfolio consists of electric lights and the IoT platform and connected lighting systems aimed at consumers and professionals.
