= BillFixers =

American television company

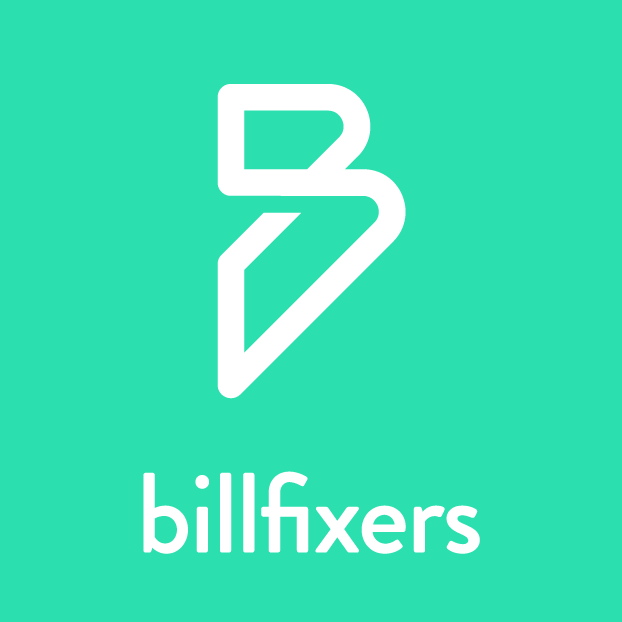
- Company type: Private
- Industry: Expert as a service
- Founded: 2014
- Founders: Ben Kurland; Julian Kurland
- Headquarters: Nashville, Tennessee
- Parent: Experian
- Website: www.billfixers.com

BillFixers is an American company that negotiates with television, internet service providers, and cell and landline companies on behalf of consumers or businesses. It was founded in July 2014 by brothers Ben and Julian Kurland with the goal of lowering household monthly bills from telecommunications service providers. BillFixers is an expert as a service (ExaaS) or justice-as-a-service company, which optimizes on work that feels menial to individual consumers. As of February 2020, BillFixers has over 25,000 clients and claims a combined savings of over $5,000,000. BillFixers was acquired by Experian in April 2022.

== History ==
Ben and Julian Kurland founded the company in Nashville, Tennessee, in July, 2014. Later that year, a customer service call between Comcast and tech entrepreneur/journalist Ryan Block went viral. The Kurlands posted on Reddit about their speciality in haggling with Comcast and thus received their first customers. In the first year, the Kurlands and their cousin Peter Zimbicki were the sole negotiators. By 2016, the business had grown to over 1,200 clients and was featured on NBC Nightly News and in The New York Times. On April 1, 2022, BillFixers was acquired by Experian Consumer Services.

== Services ==
BillFixers works primarily on TV, internet, and phone bills, although their services may extend to satellite radio, home security, and propane bills. They claim a 95% success rate and average savings of $300 per year.

=== How it works ===
The service operates by hiring experts to negotiate on behalf of consumers. When a client submits their bill, BillFixers calls the provider (like Comcast or AT&T) to seek a lowered rate. Their success is due to industry know-how and expertise on promotional and custom deals. The business generates revenue on a contingency basis, meaning payment is reliant on customer's savings.

== Reception ==
BillFixers was praised by NBC News as an "ingenious idea", and a CNET review reports 100% satisfaction. In September 2015, BillFixers was nominated as the Small Business Innovator of the Year by USA Today. A 2016 article in The New York Times questioned the legality of negotiators representing themselves as clients, but found no violation. BillFixers has also received positive feedback from My Money Blog and Debt Departure.
