= Nicholas Lodge =

English cake decorator

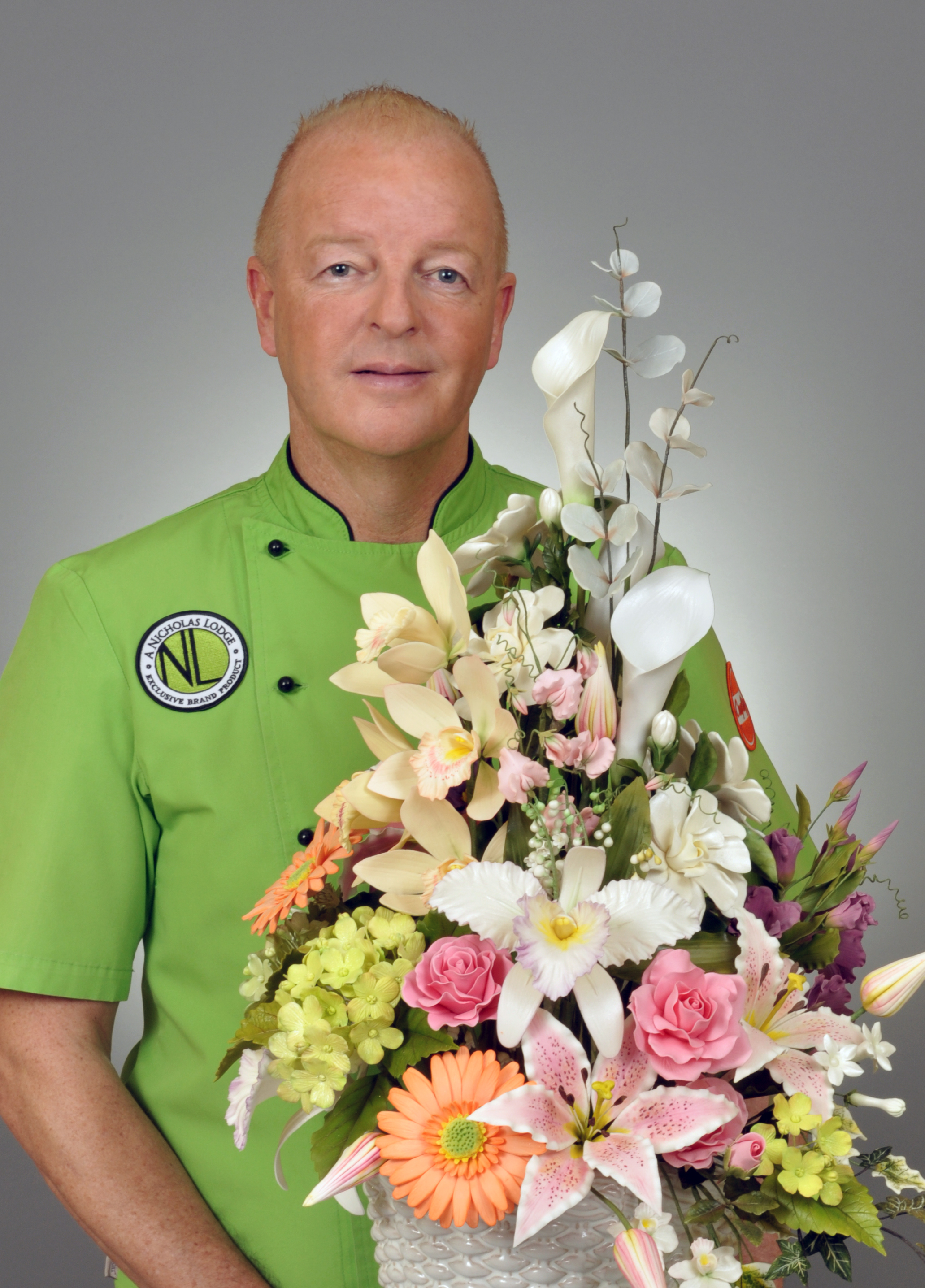
- Nicholas Lodge holding an arrangement of gum paste flowers that he created.
- Born: 12 June 1962 (age 64); Essex, England
- Died: 9 August 2022
- Education: National Bakery School
- Occupations: Pastry chef, cake artist, instructor, author, business owner
- Website: www.nicholaslodge.com

Chef Nicholas Lodge (born 12 June 1962) was a pastry chef, master cake artist, author and instructor. He was the co-owner of the Atlanta-based International Sugar Art Collection, a retail gallery and school teaching all levels of cake decorating and sugar arts. He was best known for creating botanically correct gum paste flowers. Lodge was an instructor at the French Pastry School in Chicago, Illinois. He was a recurring judge on Food Network Challenge, he judged annually at the Omni Grove Park Inn National Gingerbread House Competition and other regional competitions (Lodge judged pastry competitions on the regional, national and international level).

He died on August 9, 2022 age 60 of unknown causes.

== Early life ==
Lodge was born in Essex, England. He decorated his first cake at the age of ten, for his parents' wedding anniversary. Around the same time, while recovering from a tonsillectomy, Lodge's grandmother gave him an Australian cake decorating book. Using this book, he made his first sugar flowers, white carnations.

== Education ==
At age 11, Lodge went to Moulsham High School in Chelmsford. The school facilities and curriculum divided boys and girls, boys received training in woodworking and engineering, while girls took home economics. Lodge knew he wanted to become a chef (an uncommon career choice for a boy in England at the time), and asked to take home economics. The headteacher was hesitant to grant permission, but his parents supported his choice and insisted he be allowed into the class. At 16, Lodge enrolled at the National Bakery School in London. He was in class Monday to Thursday; on Friday and Saturday he worked at a bakery, and Saturday afternoons he worked at a flower shop. He often dissected flowers, and by making detailed notes and templates, Lodge was able to work out how he might recreate the flower exactly using gum paste. On graduation, Lodge was awarded the distinction of Most Outstanding Cake Decorating Student.

== Career ==
=== England ===
After graduating from the National Bakery School, Lodge was offered the position of principal wedding cake designer at Woodnutts, one of England's top sugar arts schools. While at Woodnutts, he created cakes for Harrods, the Savoy, and The Ritz. Lodge next held a teaching position at Mary Ford's Cake Artistry Centre in Bournemouth. At this time, he was commissioned by the royal family to make a cake for the Queen Mother's 80th birthday. Lodge was accepted by the royal family to create one of the 24 official wedding cakes for the wedding of Lady Diana Spencer and Prince Charles. The cake was nine feet tall and weighed over 300 pounds. Three years later, Lodge was once again hired by the royal family to create a christening cake for Prince Harry. The cake was finely detailed with swans, water lilies, and a miniature baby in royal swaddling clothes.

In 1985, Lodge was commissioned to write his first book. More books followed along with instructional videos and international teaching tours. After the publication of his fourth book, Lodge returned to Moulsham High School with a gift of approximately $30,000, books, sewing machines and other equipment for the home economics department.

=== United States ===
Lodge traveled to the United States in the 1980s to demonstrate at the International Cake Exploration Societé (ICES) convention. At the time, most American cakes were covered with thick buttercream icing. Many of the students in Lodge's classes had never seen the techniques he was using to decorate cakes with royal icing and rolled fondant. Feeling like the cake decorating field had become saturated in England, Lodge decided to move to the United States and teach classes on cake decorating. During a two-week class in Atlanta, Georgia, he decided to make the city his new home. The two-week class turned into a three-year teaching position.

In 1992, Lodge and his business partner Scott Ewing opened their own school and retail gallery, the International Sugar Art Collection (ISAC) in Norcross, Georgia. There is also a Nicholas Lodge International Sugar Art Collection Japan sister school in Tokyo, Japan, which opened in 1995. Lodge taught classes at ISAC as well as across the United States and abroad. To date, he has instructed cake decorating classes in 26 different counties. Teaching kept him so busy that in 1993 he was unable to accept an invitation from the Clinton White House for a one-year presidential fellowship. In 2001, Lodge was inducted into the ICES Hall of Fame; to date he is the youngest ever recipient of that honor. Beginning in 2003 the annual Epcot International Food and Wine Festival at Walt Disney World Resort in Orlando, Florida, has invited Lodge to be featured as a guest pastry chef. This relationship has led to classes that Lodge teaches exclusively for Walt Disney World Resort pastry chefs. The Food Network asked Lodge in 2005 to be a judge on two seasons of Food Network Challenge. At the same time, he was offered another annual judging position at the National Gingerbread House Competition held at the Omni Grove Park Inn; he now holds the title of head judge.

From 2009 to 2014, Lodge was the spokesperson for Albert Uster Imports (AUI). He hosted AUI roadshows across the United States showcasing AUI rolled fondant and other products as well as demonstrating how to use different techniques in wedding cake designs. Beginning in January 2015, Nicholas became the brand ambassador for the Renshaw line of rolled fondant and gumpaste.

Lodge has taught classes at Le Cordon Bleu, Johnson & Wales, the Art Institute of Atlanta and the French Pastry School. He initially taught the gum paste section of a 24-week program at the French Pastry School, and in 2010 he joined the teaching team as a chef instructor for the 16-week L'Art du Gateau program (aimed specifically at those wishing to pursue a career in cake decorating and sugar artistry). For many years, Lodge was a judge, demonstrator and guest instructor at the World Pastry Forum, and beginning in 2013 he accepted an invitation to be a recurring judge and demonstrator at Pastry Live Atlanta.

== Honors ==
- 2001 – Inducted into the International Cake Exploration Societé Hall of Fame (youngest ever to receive this honor).
- 2003 – Distinguished Visiting Author Award, Johnson & Wales (23 October 2003).
- 2009 – The Sweet Life Award: Hall of Fame (given at the National Capital Area Cake Show)
- 2010 – Named Top Ten Pastry Chef and Top Ten Cake Artist, Dessert Professional magazine (first ever to receive both honors in one year).

== Bibliography ==
Lodge has written numerous cake decorating books and instruction manuals.

- The Art of Sugarcraft: Sugar Flowers (1986, ISBN 0-948075-11-2)
- The Art of Sugarcraft: Pastillage and Sugar Moulding (1987, ISBN 0-948075-55-4)
- The International School of Sugarcraft Book One: Beginners (1988, ISBN 1-85391-493-2)
- The International School of Sugarcraft Book Two: Advanced (1988, ISBN 0-948075-78-3)
- A Complete Step-by-Step Guide: Great Cake Decorating with Janice Murfitt (1989, Better Homes and Gardens Cook Book Club)
- The Victorian Book of Cakes introduction by Nicholas Lodge (1991, ISBN 1-85238-135-3)
- Cake Stling (1991, ISBN 1-85238-137-X)
- Floral Patterns (1992, ISBN 978-185238-150-9)
- The Art of Sugarcraft: Lace and Filigree (1992, ISBN 0-948075-56-2)
- Sugar Flowers from around the World (1993, ISBN 1-85391-074-0)
- The International School of Sugarcraft Book Three: New Skills (2003, ISBN 1-74045-306-9)

=== Videography ===
Lodge has created a series of videos and DVDs to complement his instructional books.

- Touch of Spring with Margaret Ford for CelCakes (1992)
- On the Wild Side with Margaret Ford for Celcakes (1993)
- Sugar Facts with Margaret Ford for CelCakes (1993)
- Cake it Easy with Margaret Ford for CelCakes (1994)
- Bows, Drapes, and Tassels (2001)
- Gumpaste Gardenia & Peony (2001)
- Gumpaste Bugs (2002)
- Gumpaste Bearded Iris & Southern Magnolia (2002)
- Making Gumpaste & Covering a Cake with Rolled Fondant (2003)
- Mini Cakes (2003)
- French Style Decorating Techniques (2005)
- Gumpaste Roses & Wedding Cake Decorating Techniques (2006)
- Gumpaste Hydrangea & Sunflower (2007)
- Exotic & Tropical Gumpaste Flowers (2008)
- Gumpaste Filler Flowers (2009)
- Mastering the Art of: Patchwork Cutters (2010)
- Mastering the Art of: Gumpaste Flowers of the South (2011)
- Mastering the Art of: Gumpaste Orchids (2012)
- Mastering the Art of: Gumpaste Lilies (2013)
