= International Biscuit Festival =

Food festival

The International Biscuit Festival is an annual festival held in Knoxville, Tennessee to celebrate the biscuit. The first festival was held on June 4–5, 2010, attracting over 5,000 attendees. The 2011 event was held Memorial Day weekend, with attendance estimated at between 15,000 and 20,000.

The event consists of a number of biscuit-related activities, special meals and entertainment. The activities include a buffet breakfast featuring a variety of biscuits created by East Tennessee restaurants and caterers, a vendor area with businesses selling biscuit-compatible foods, kitchenware, cookbooks, and artwork, a tasting area with participating restaurants offering samples of signature biscuits, a live baking competition in multiple biscuit categories, a fine dining event presented by Blackberry Farm, and a tongue in cheek pageant with contestants demonstrating poise, fashion and talent.

In 2011, the event added a charitable component to benefit Share Our Strength and Second Harvest.

IBF went on hiatus in 2018.
