= Joseph Lenn =

American chef

Joseph Lenn is an American chef and restaurateur. He is the chef and owner of J.C. Holdway, a restaurant in Knoxville, Tennessee, named after his great-uncle. Lenn is the first chef from Tennessee to receive the James Beard Foundation Award for Best Chef: Southeast, which he won in 2013 for his work at Blackberry Farm in Walland, Tennessee.

== Career ==
Lenn worked at Blackberry Farm for ten years and served as Executive Chef for five of those years. In 2016, he opened J.C. Holdway, a wood-fire restaurant in downtown Knoxville focused on Appalachian ingredients and Southern cooking traditions. The restaurant is located in the historic Daylight Building on Union Avenue. Lenn was featured in the PBS television series The Mind of a Chef (Season 2, “Roots”), where he appeared alongside Sean Brock and Anthony Bourdain in a segment filmed at Blackberry Farm.

His work and culinary approach have been profiled by national outlets including The New York Times, Eater, Esquire, and Forbes Travel Guide.

He has also contributed original recipes to The Wall Street Journal, including features on grilled lamb chops with eggplant tapenade, wax bean salad with cucumber, blackberries, and mint, pancetta-wrapped quail with tomato-pesto salad, and grilled shrimp with watermelon, basil, corn, and burrata. His recipe for gochujang barbecue ribs with peanuts and scallions was also published in The New York Times.

== Awards and honors ==
=== : James Beard Foundation Awards ===
- 2013 James Beard Award for Best Chef: Southeast

=== Restaurant recognition ===
- Esquire’s Best New Restaurants in America (2017)
- Eater’s 12 Best New Restaurants in America (2017)
- Garden & Gun’s The Year in Southern Restaurants (2016)
- Wine Spectator Award of Excellence (2025)

== Personal life ==
Lenn was born and raised in Knoxville, Tennessee. He continues to live and work in East Tennessee and is known for emphasizing local sourcing and seasonal Southern cuisine in his cooking.
