= Good Hot Fish =

Restaurant in Asheville, North Carolina, U.S.

- Interactive map of Good Hot Fish

Restaurant information
- Established: January 2024
- Location: 10 Buxton Avenue, Asheville, North Carolina, 28801, United States
- Coordinates: 35°35′18″N 82°33′14″W
- Website: goodhotfish.com

Good Hot Fish is a restaurant in Asheville, North Carolina, United States. It opened on January 20, 2024, in Asheville's South Slope. Founded and owned by Chef Ashleigh Shanti, it was featured on Season 54 of the television series Diners, Drive-Ins and Dives.

== Description ==
According to Eater Carolinas, the restaurant's owner "mixes ideas from traditional fish camps with Black Appalachian and Southern cuisine". The menu includes shrimp burgers and fish sandwiches, crab dip, hushpuppies, and Sea Island red peas.

== History ==
Good Hot Fish started out as a monthly pop-up at the brewery Burial Beer. After the pop up gained popularity, the owners of the brewery offered to lease her a small space in their building. The restaurant opened in January 2024. The name comes from Shanti's great aunt Hattie Mae, who used to shout '‘Come get your good hot fish!" while working at fish stands.

== Reception ==
The business was included in The New York Times's 2024 list of the nation's 50 best restaurants. Gina Smith included the business in Eater Carolinas's 2024 list of eighteen "essential" restaurants in Asheville.
