= National Gingerbread House Competition =

Annual Christmas event in the U.S.

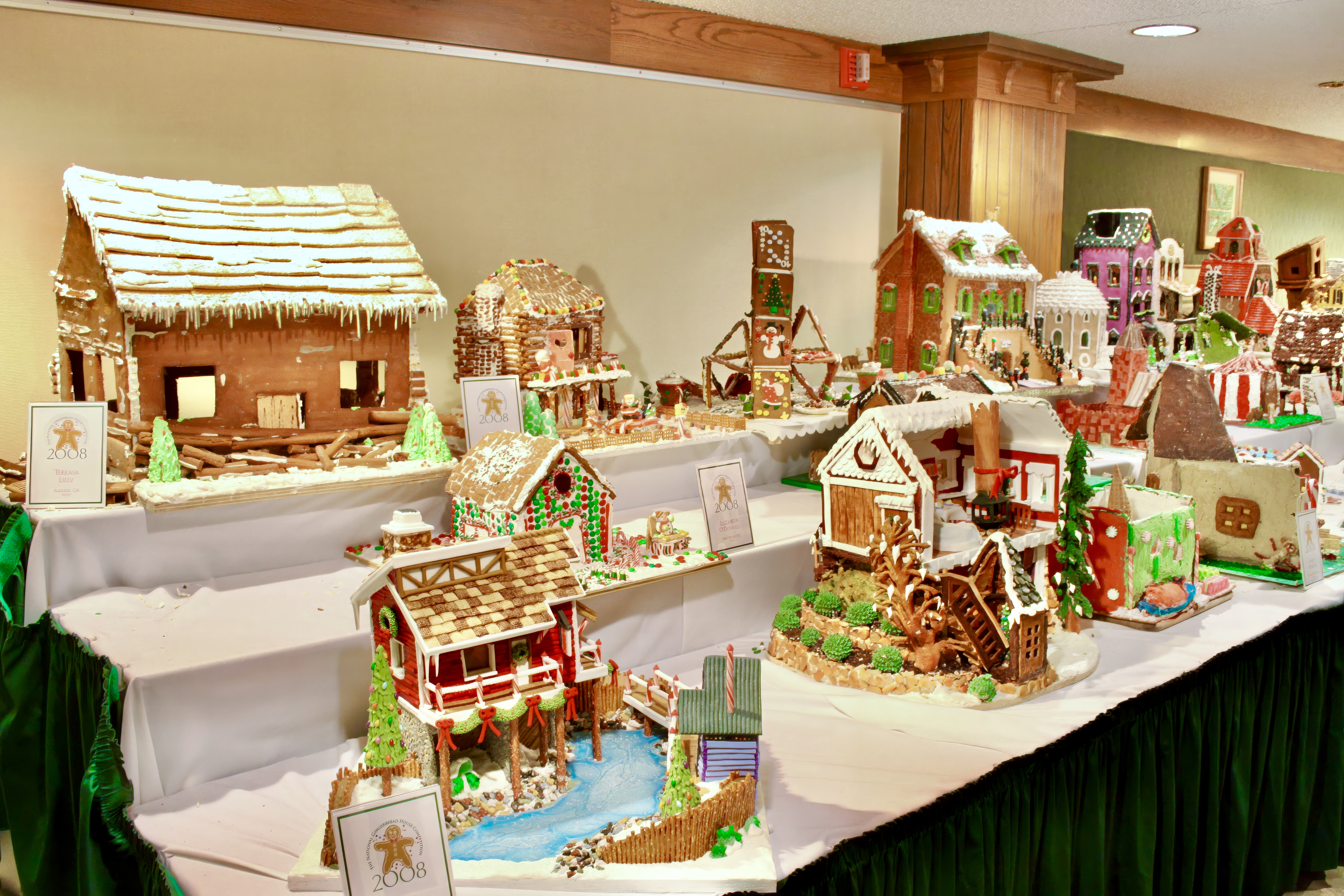
National Gingerbread House Competition entries on display at the Omni Grove Park Inn

The National Gingerbread House Competition is an annual event held at Omni Grove Park Inn in Asheville, North Carolina, United States. Finalists are placed on public display in the resort's halls each November and December. The competition has been broadcast by Good Morning America on ABC, The TODAY Show on NBC, the Food Network, and the Travel Channel.

The contest includes Adult, Teen, Youth and Child age categories. Hundreds of contestants from across the United States vie for more than $40,000 in prizes. Entries must fit into a 2-foot (0.61 m) cube and be composed of at least 75 percent gingerbread and be completely built from edible materials. Entries have included anything from merry-go-rounds to sea monsters to the Statue of Liberty – the competition is not limited to houses. The top ten contestants in each group receive ribbons. The top three entries in each category get monetary prizes and, in some cases are awarded vacations at an Omni Hotels resort of their choice.

The event started in 1992 with a small set of gingerbread houses built by people in the community to celebrate the Christmas holiday season. It was not a contest and not expected to continue the next year. As the years went by, visitors began to inquire about which entry was the winner, and the contest was born. Celebrity judges have included Carla Hall, Nicholas Lodge and Ashleigh Shanti. Judges focus on difficulty, appearance, originality, precision, consistency of theme, and creativity. There are also special awards in fun categories such as Most Unique Ingredient, Best Use of Color, and Best Use of Sprinkles.

In 2020, during the COVID-19 pandemic, the public display portion was canceled due to social distancing guidelines, though some gingerbread creations were showcased digitally. The competition was canceled in 2024, after the resort closed temporarily due to flooding in Asheville from Hurricane Helene. Creations were still accepted for display but the judging and prize portion was suspended.
