= Gingerbread house =

Model house made of gingerbread

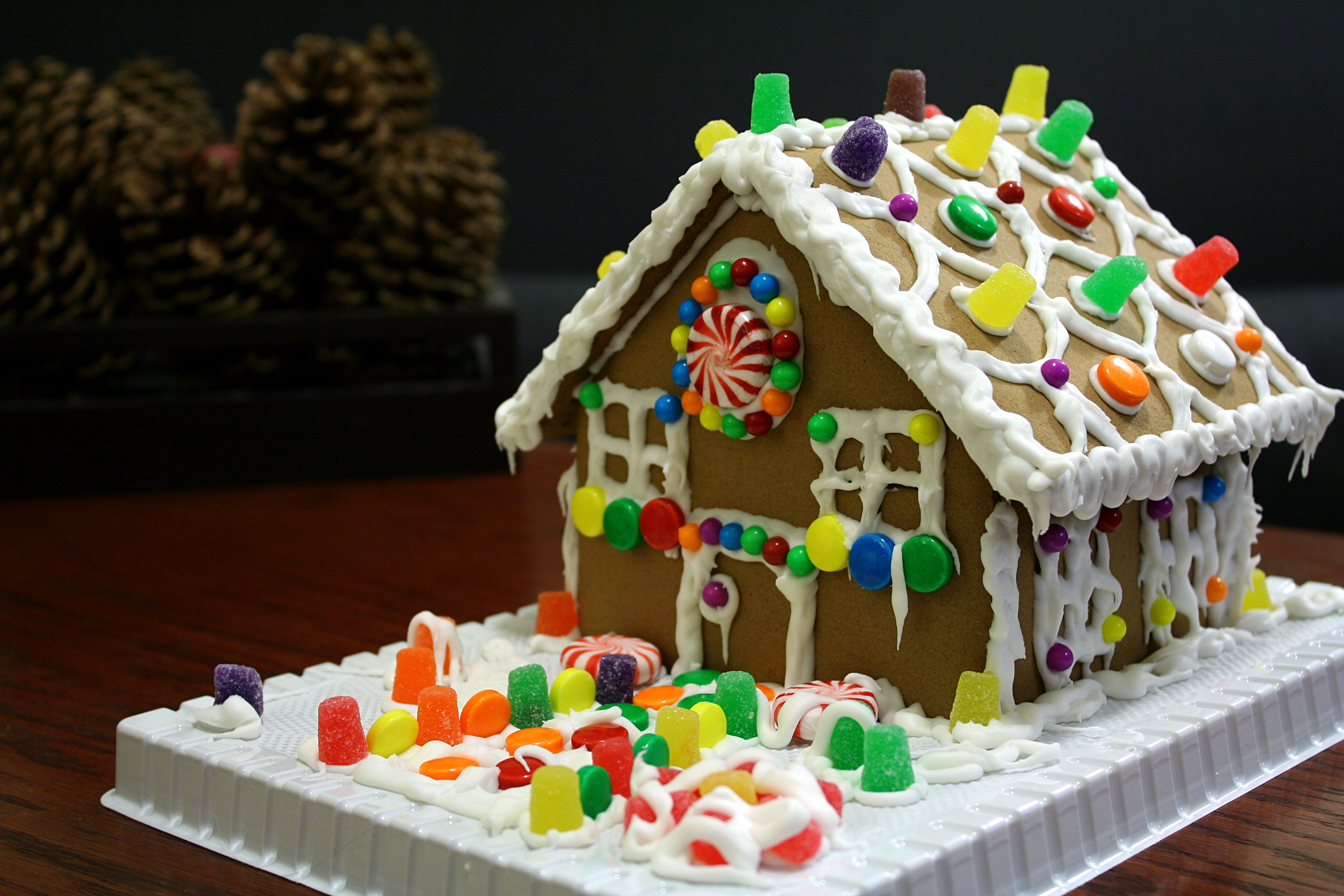
A typical store-bought gingerbread house

A gingerbread house is a novelty confectionery shaped like a building that is made of cookie dough, cut and baked into appropriate components like walls and roofing. These houses, covered with a variety of candies and icing, are popular Christmas decorations. The usual base material is crisp gingerbread, hence the name. Another type of model-making with gingerbread uses a boiled dough that can be moulded like clay to form edible statuettes or other decorations.

== History ==
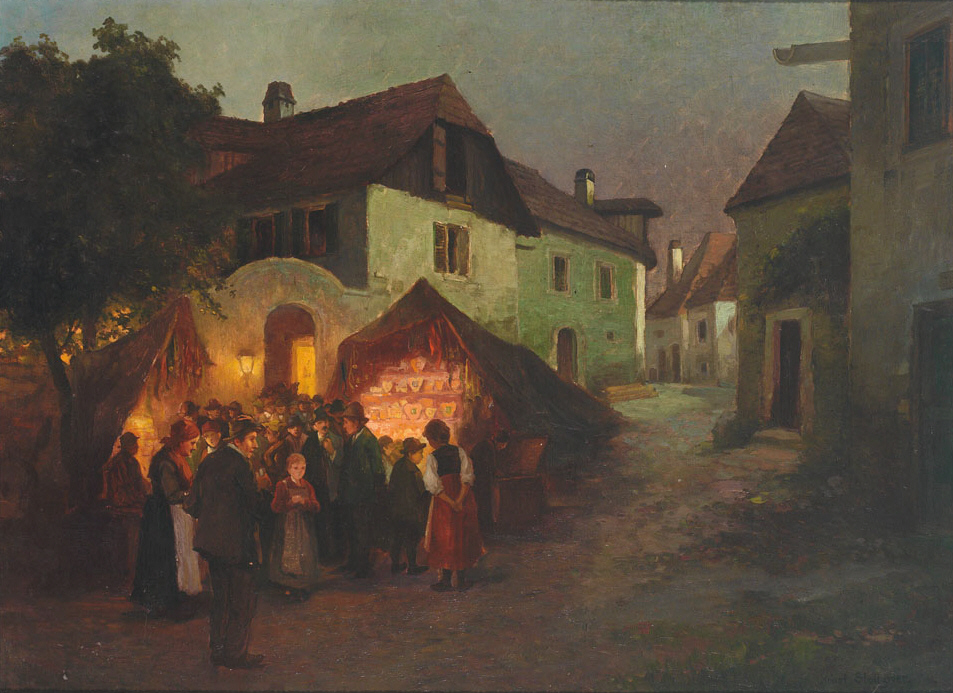
Painting depicting gingerbread sold at the fair

Records of honey cakes can be traced to ancient Rome.

According to French legend, gingerbread was brought to Europe in 992 by the Armenian monk, later saint, Gregory of Nicopolis (Gregory Makar). He lived for seven years in Bondaroy, France, near the town of Pithiviers, where he taught priests and other Christians to make gingerbread. Gregory died in 999.

Gingerbread, in its modern form, descends from Medieval European culinary traditions. Gingerbread was also shaped into different forms by monks in Franconia, Germany in the 13th century. Lebkuchen bakers are recorded as early as 1296 in Ulm and 1395 in Nuremberg, Germany. Nuremberg was recognized as the "Gingerbread Capital of the World" when, in the 17th century, the guild started to employ master bakers and skilled workers to create complicated works of art from gingerbread. Medieval bakers used carved boards to create elaborate designs. During the 13th century, the custom spread across Europe. It was taken to Sweden in the 13th century by German immigrants; there are references from Vadstena Abbey of Swedish nuns baking gingerbread to ease indigestion in 1444. The traditional sweetener is honey, used by the guild in Nuremberg. Spices used are ginger, cinnamon, cloves, nutmeg and cardamom. Gingerbread figurines date back to the 15th century, and figural biscuit-making was practised in the 16th century. The first documented instance of figure-shaped gingerbread biscuits is from the court of Elizabeth I of England, who had gingerbread figures made in the likeness of some of her important guests.

== History of gingerbread shaping ==
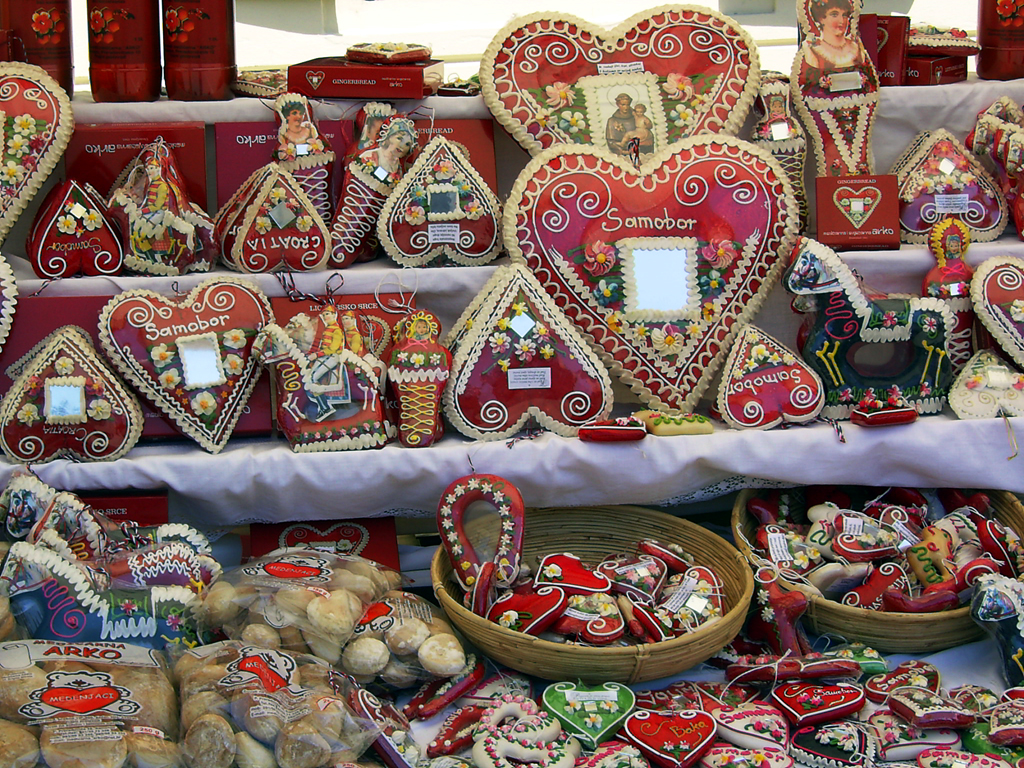
Decorated gingerbread hearts with mirrors, hussars, and market souvenirs in Croatia

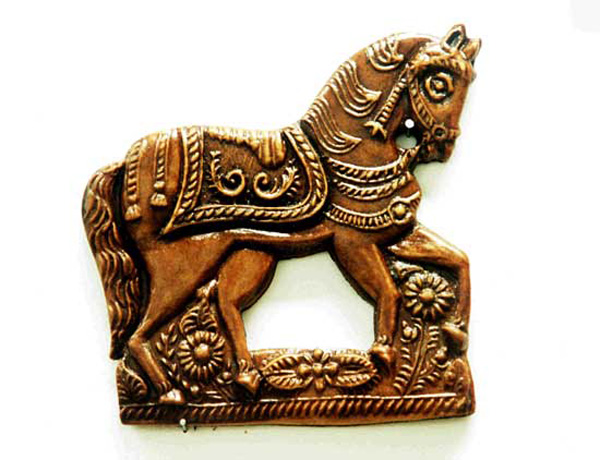
A gingerbread print horse

The gingerbread bakers were gathered into professional baker guilds. In many European countries, gingerbread bakers were a distinct component of the bakers' guild. Gingerbread baking developed into an acknowledged profession. In the 17th century, only professional gingerbread bakers were permitted to bake gingerbread except at Christmas and Easter, when anyone was allowed to bake it.

In Europe, gingerbreads were sold in special shops and at seasonal markets that sold sweets and gingerbread shaped as hearts, stars, soldiers, babies, riders, trumpets, swords, pistols and animals. Gingerbread was especially sold outside churches on Sundays. Religious gingerbread reliefs were purchased for the particular religious events, such as Christmas and Easter. The decorated gingerbreads were given as presents to adults and children, or given as a love token, and bought particularly for weddings, where gingerbreads were distributed to the wedding guests. A gingerbread relief of the patron saint was frequently given as a gift on a person's name day, the day of the saint associated with his or her given name. It was the custom to bake biscuits and paint them as window decorations. The most intricate gingerbreads were also embellished with iced patterns, often using colours and also gilded with gold leaf. Gingerbread was also worn as a talisman in battle or as protection against evil spirits.

Gingerbread was a significant form of popular art in Europe; major centers of gingerbread mould carvings included Lyon, Nuremberg, Pest, Prague, Pardubice, Pulsnitz, Ulm, and Toruń. Gingerbread moulds often displayed actual happenings, by portraying new rulers and their consorts, for example. Substantial mould collections are held at the Ethnographic Museum in Toruń, Poland and the Bread Museum in Ulm, Germany. During the winter months, medieval gingerbread pastries, usually dipped in wine or other alcoholic beverages, were consumed. In America, the German-speaking communities of Pennsylvania and Maryland continued this tradition until the early 20th century. The tradition survived in colonial North America, where the pastries were baked as ginger snap cookies and gained favour as Christmas tree decorations.

The tradition of making decorated gingerbread houses started in Germany in the early 1800s. According to certain researchers, the first gingerbread houses were the result of the well-known Brothers Grimm fairy tale "Hansel and Gretel", in which the two children abandoned in the forest come across an edible house made of bread with sugar decorations. After this book was published, German bakers began baking ornamented fairy-tale houses of lebkuchen (gingerbread). These became popular during Christmas, a tradition that came to America with Pennsylvanian German immigrants. According to other food historians, the Grimm brothers were speaking about something that already existed.

== Modern times ==
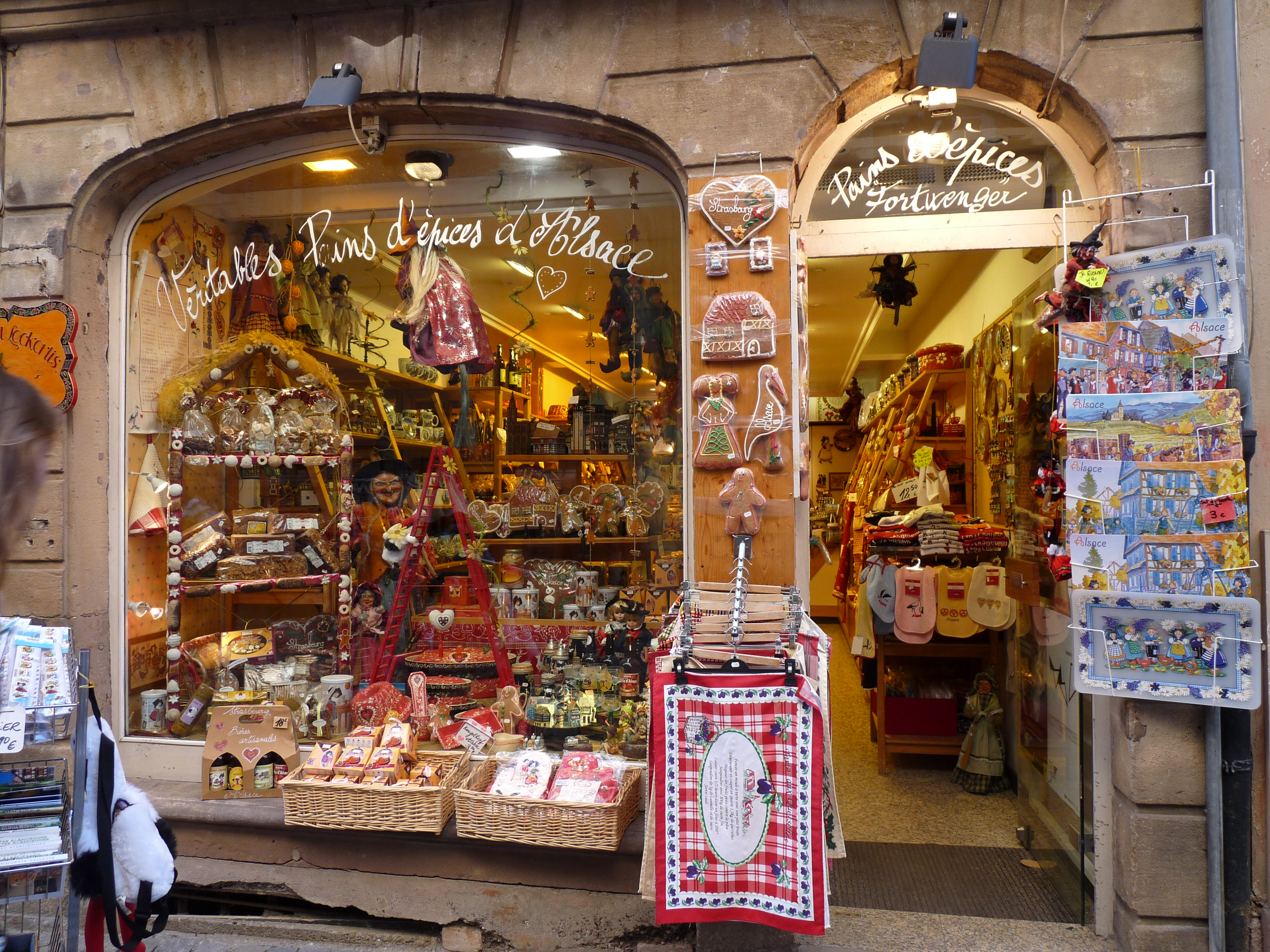
Gingerbread shop in Strasbourg, France

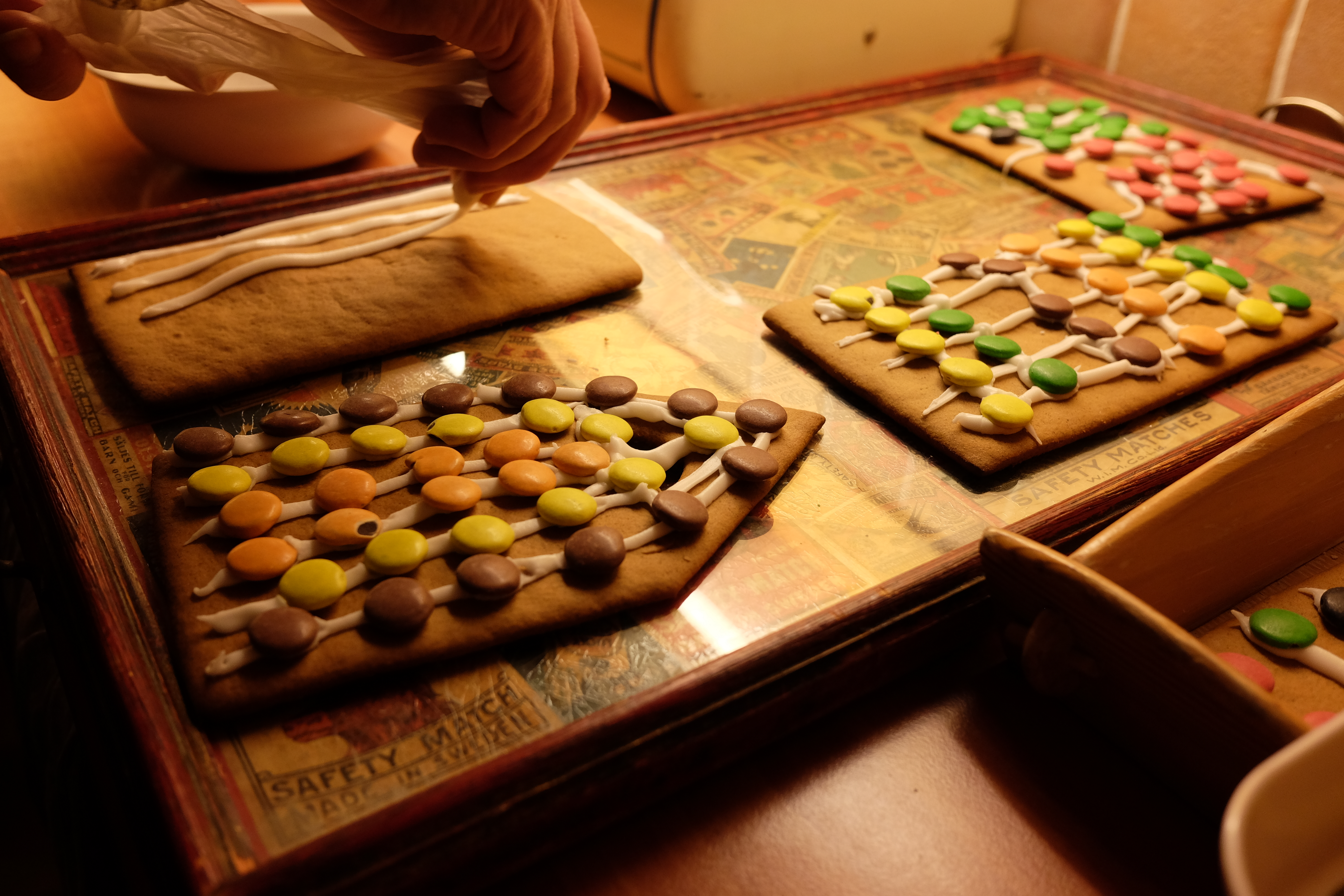
Swedish gingerbread house being prepared. Glaze is put on the walls

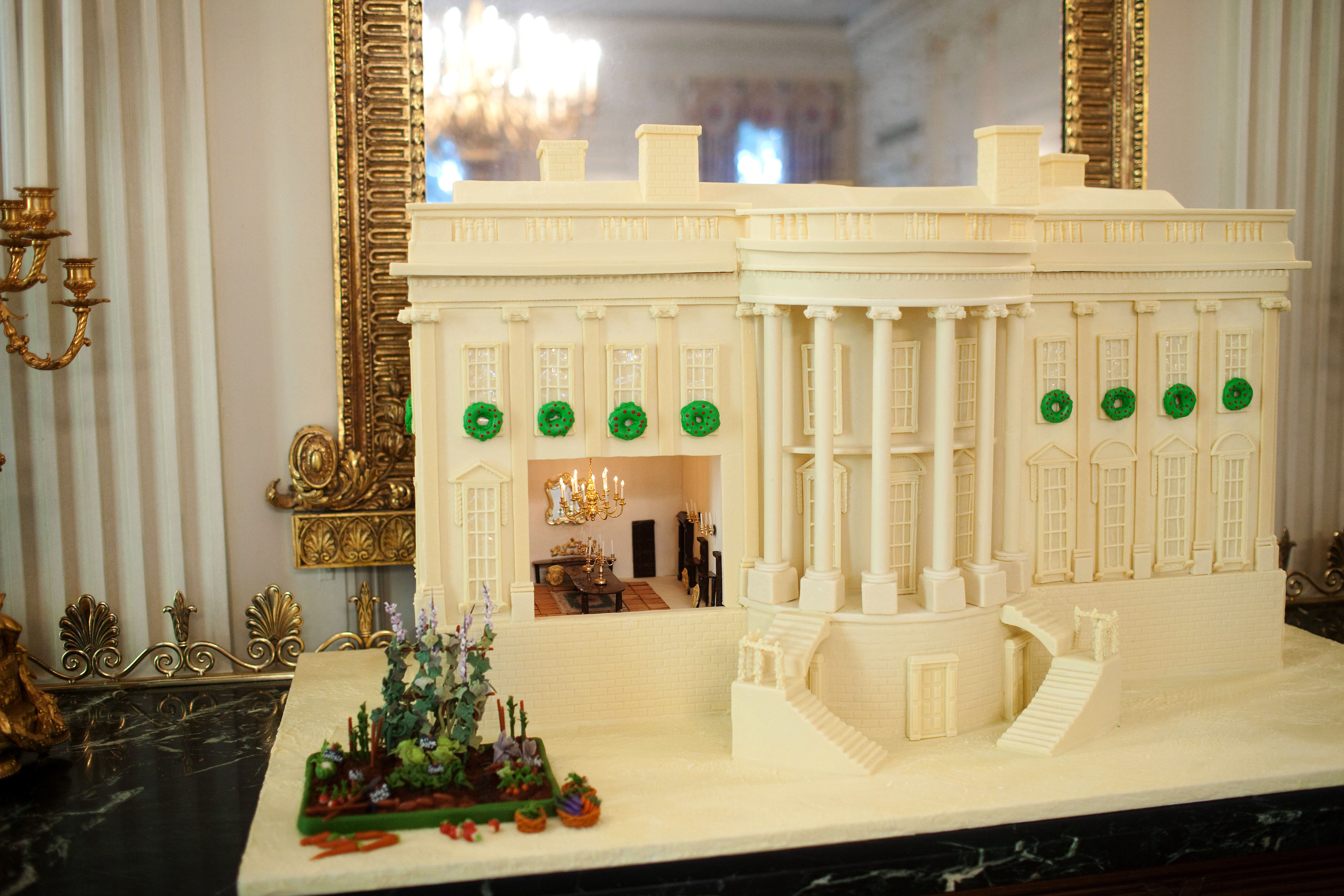
Replica of the White House made of gingerbread and white chocolate

External videos
- MP.4 version 1:49, Building the White House gingerbread house, 2013

In modern times, the tradition has continued in certain places in Europe. In Germany, Christmas markets sell decorated gingerbread before Christmas. Lebkuchenhaus or Pfefferkuchenhaus are the German terms for a gingerbread house. Making gingerbread houses is a Christmas tradition in many families. They are typically made before Christmas using pieces of baked gingerbread dough assembled with melted sugar. The roof 'tiles' can consist of frosting or candy. The gingerbread house yard is usually decorated with icing to represent snow.

A gingerbread house does not have to be an actual house, although it is the most common. It can be anything from a castle to a small cabin, or another kind of building, such as a church, an art museum, or a sports stadium. Other items, such as cars, gingerbread men, and gingerbread women, can be made of gingerbread dough.

In most cases, royal icing is used as an adhesive to secure the main parts of the house, as it can be made quickly and forms a secure bond when set.

In Sweden, gingerbread houses are prepared on Saint Lucy's Day. Since 1991, the people of Bergen, Norway, have built a city of gingerbread houses each year before Christmas. Named Pepperkakebyen (Norwegian for "the gingerbread village"), it is claimed to be the world's largest such city. Every child under the age of 12 can make their own house at no cost with the help of their parents. In 2009, the gingerbread city was destroyed in an act of vandalism. A group of building design, construction, and sales professionals in Washington, D.C., also collaborate on a themed "Gingertown" every year.

In the United States, the National Gingerbread House Competition began in 1992 at the Grove Park Inn in Asheville, North Carolina. In San Francisco, the Fairmont and St. Francis hotels display rival gingerbread houses during the Christmas season.

== Guinness World records ==
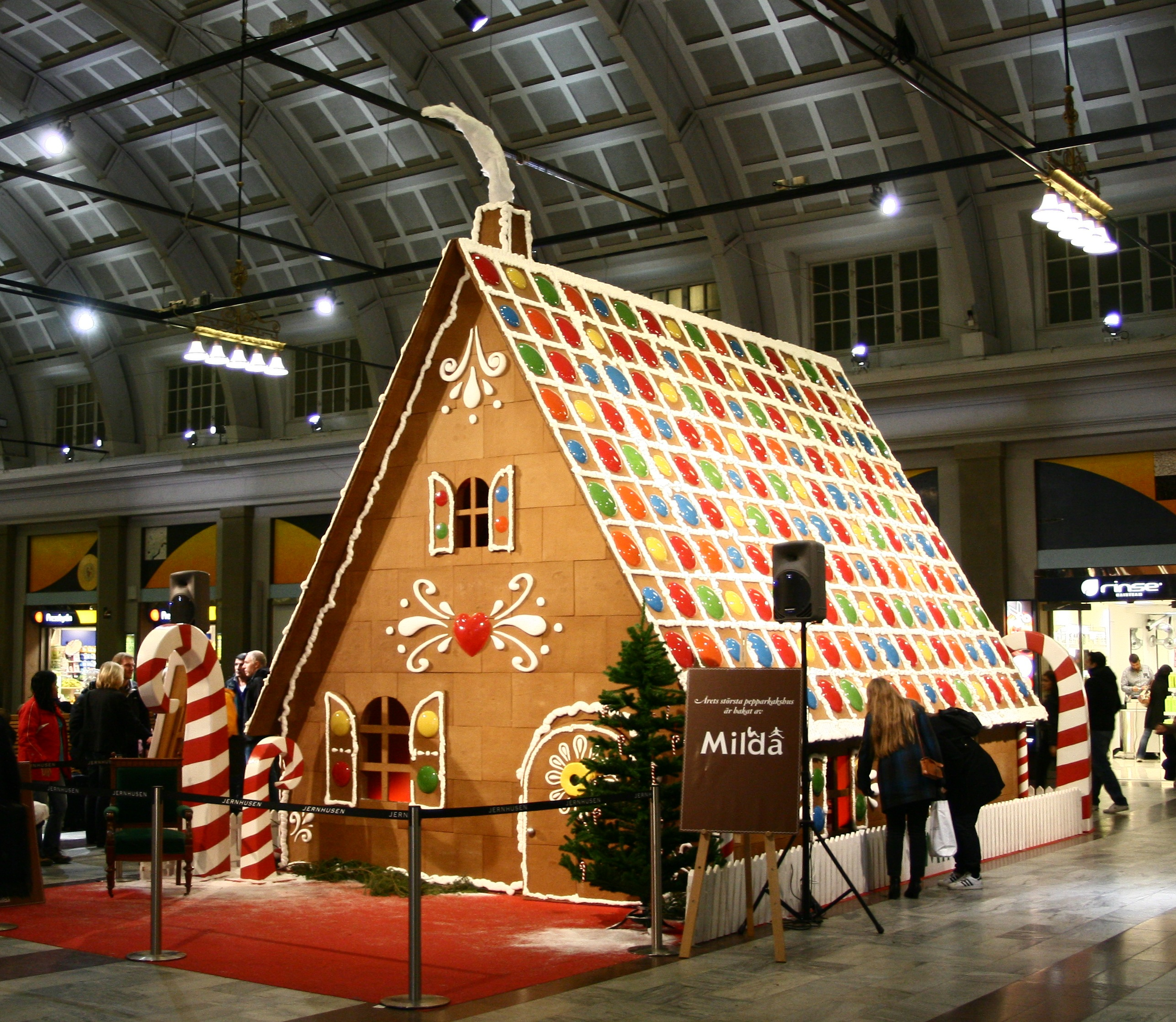
A full-scale gingerbread house as a Christmas decoration in Stockholm, 2009 (It was made of 294 kg (648 lb) flour, 92 kg (203 lb) margarine, 100.4 kg (221 lb) sugar, 66.3 L (14.6 imp gal; 17.5 US gal) Golden syrup, 2.2 kg (4.9 lb) each of cinnamon, cloves, ginger and 3.7 kg (8.2 lb) baking powder.)

In 2013, a group in Bryan, Texas, US, broke the Guinness World Record set the previous year for the largest gingerbread house, with a 2,520-square-foot (234 m^{2}) edible-walled house in aid of a hospital trauma centre. The gingerbread house had an estimated calorific value exceeding 35.8 million and ingredients included 2,925 pounds (1,327 kg) of brown sugar, 1,800 pounds (820 kg) of butter, 7,200 eggs and 7,200 pounds (3,300 kg) of general purpose flour. As of 2025, this record was since broken by a 44,838 cubic foot gingerbread house modeled after Home Alone.

The executive sous-chef at the New York Marriott Marquis hotel, Jon Lovitch, broke the record for the largest gingerbread village with 135 residential and 22 commercial buildings, and cable cars and a train also made of gingerbread. It was displayed at the New York Hall of Science. Another contender from Bergen, Norway made a gingerbread town called Pepperkakebyen.

== Gallery ==
Gingerbread houses

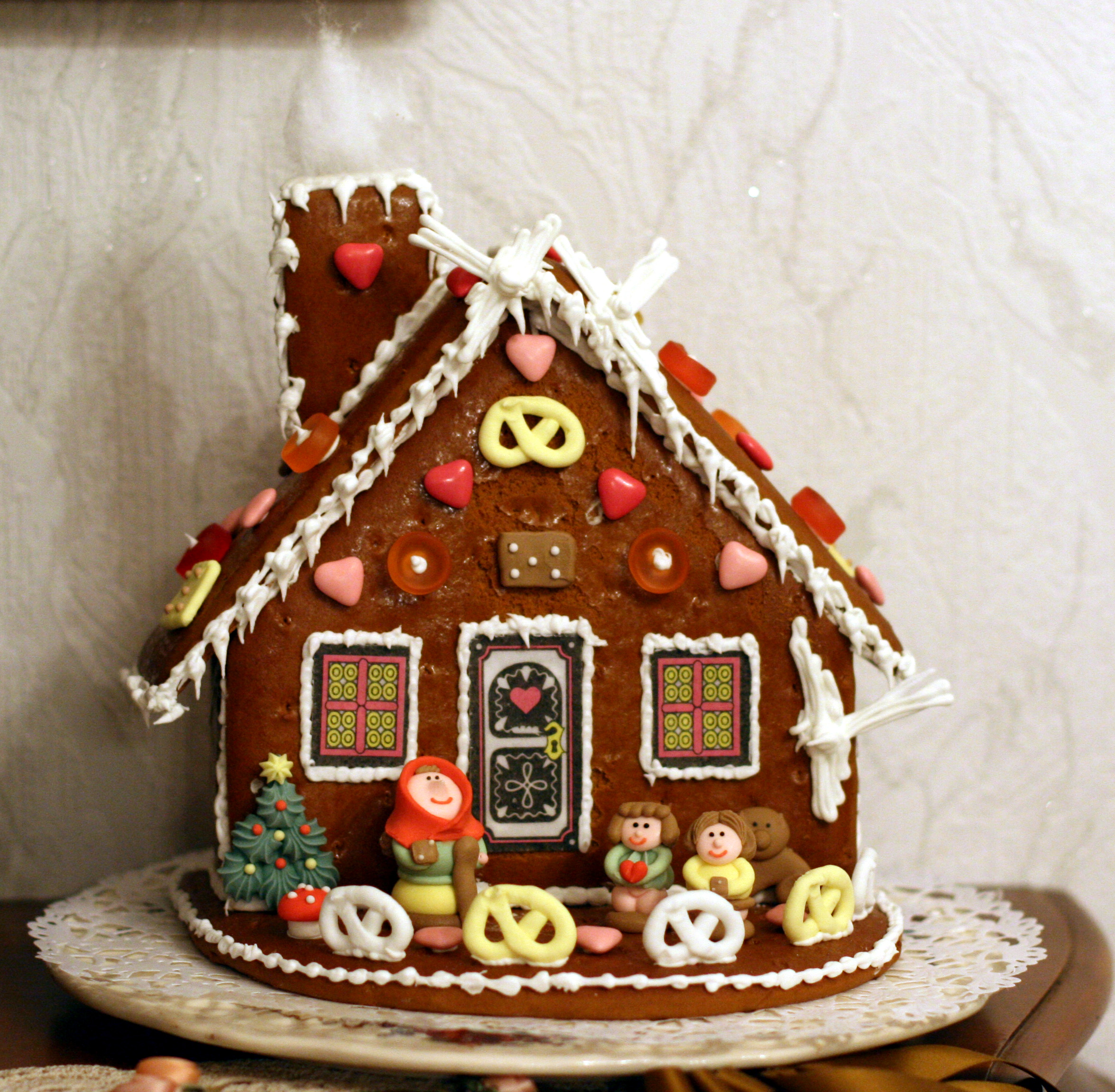
Gingerbread house with candy

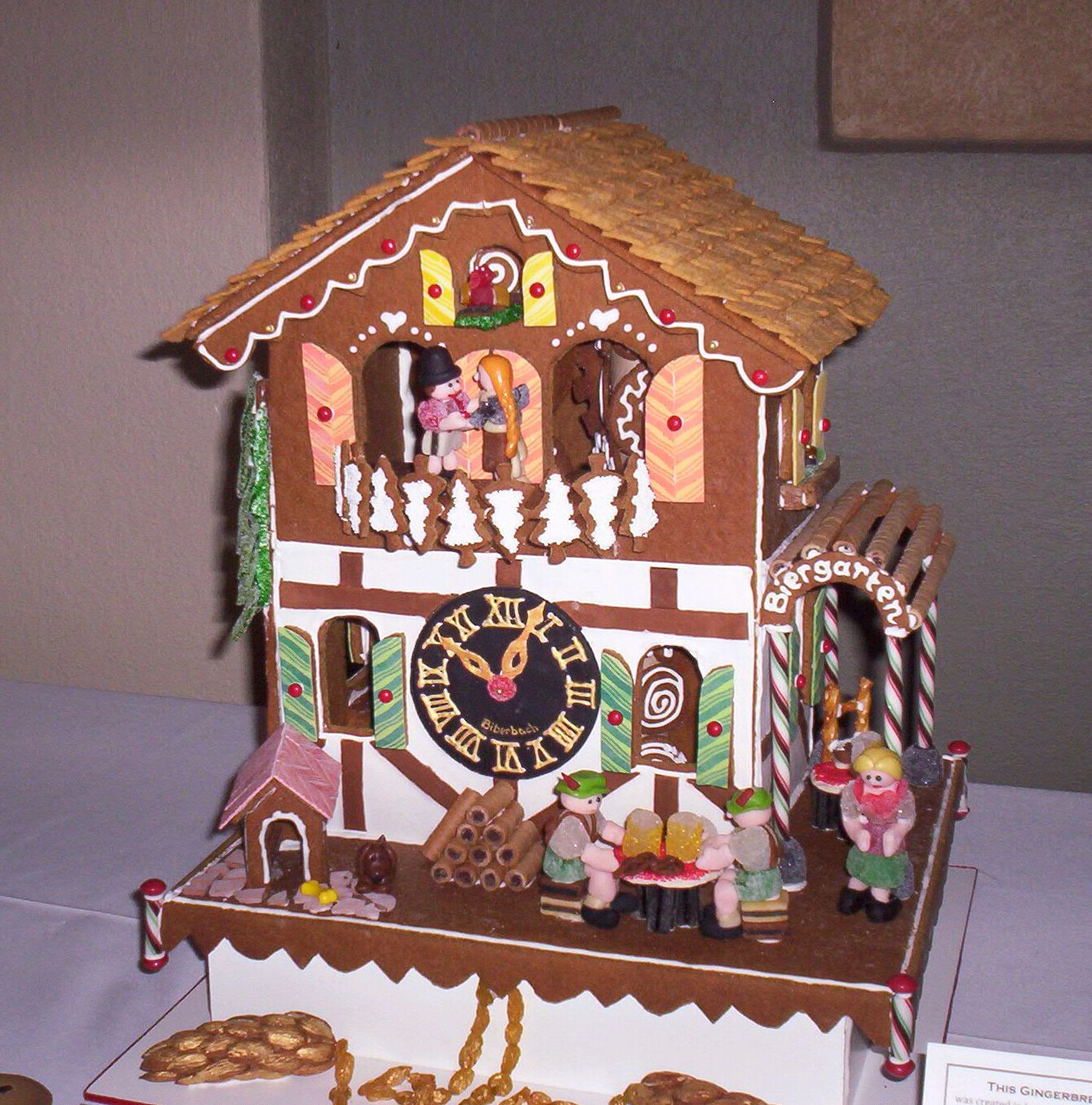
A gingerbread house with clock and candy decorations

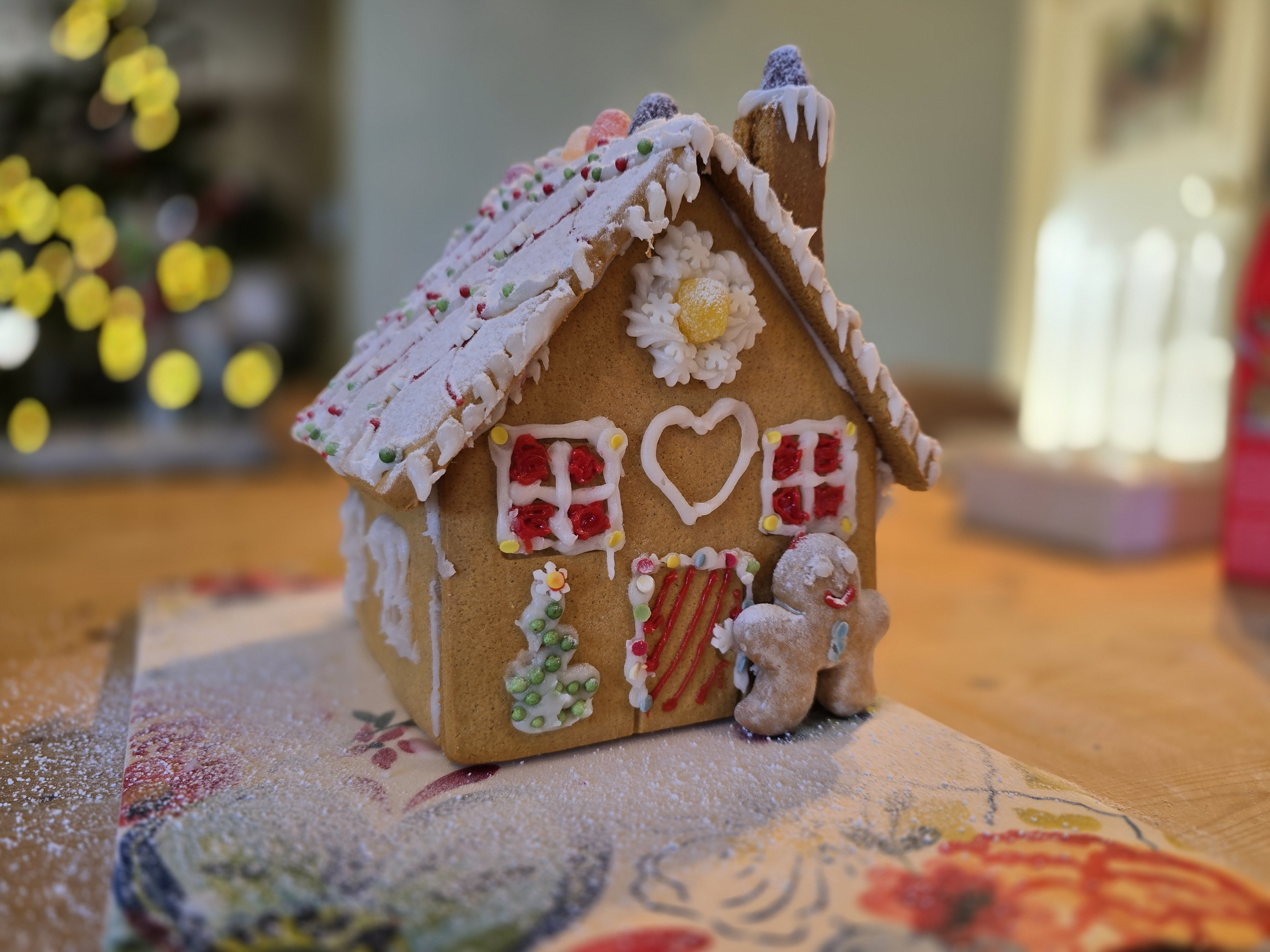
Christmas gingerbread house kit

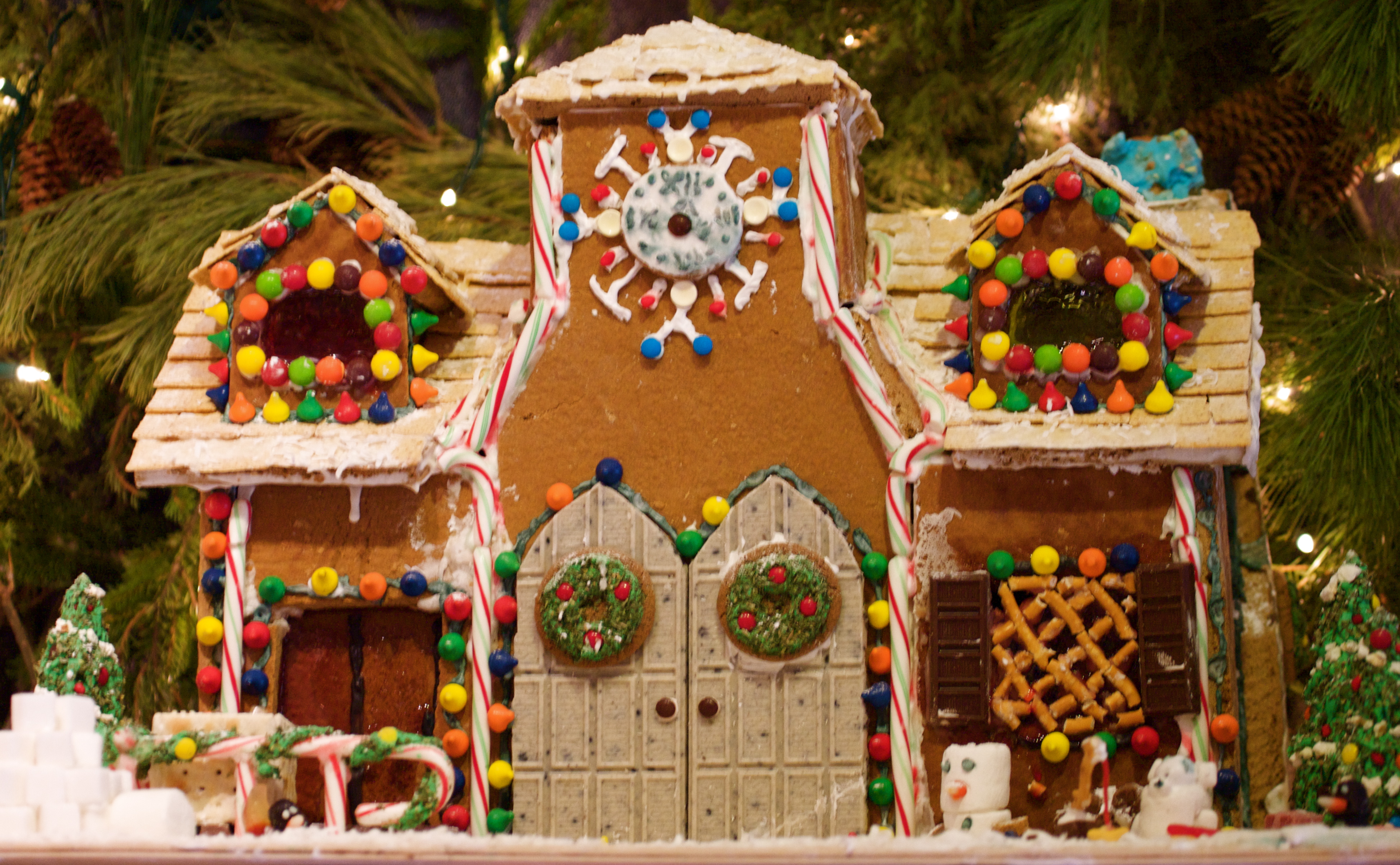
Gingerbread house with double doors

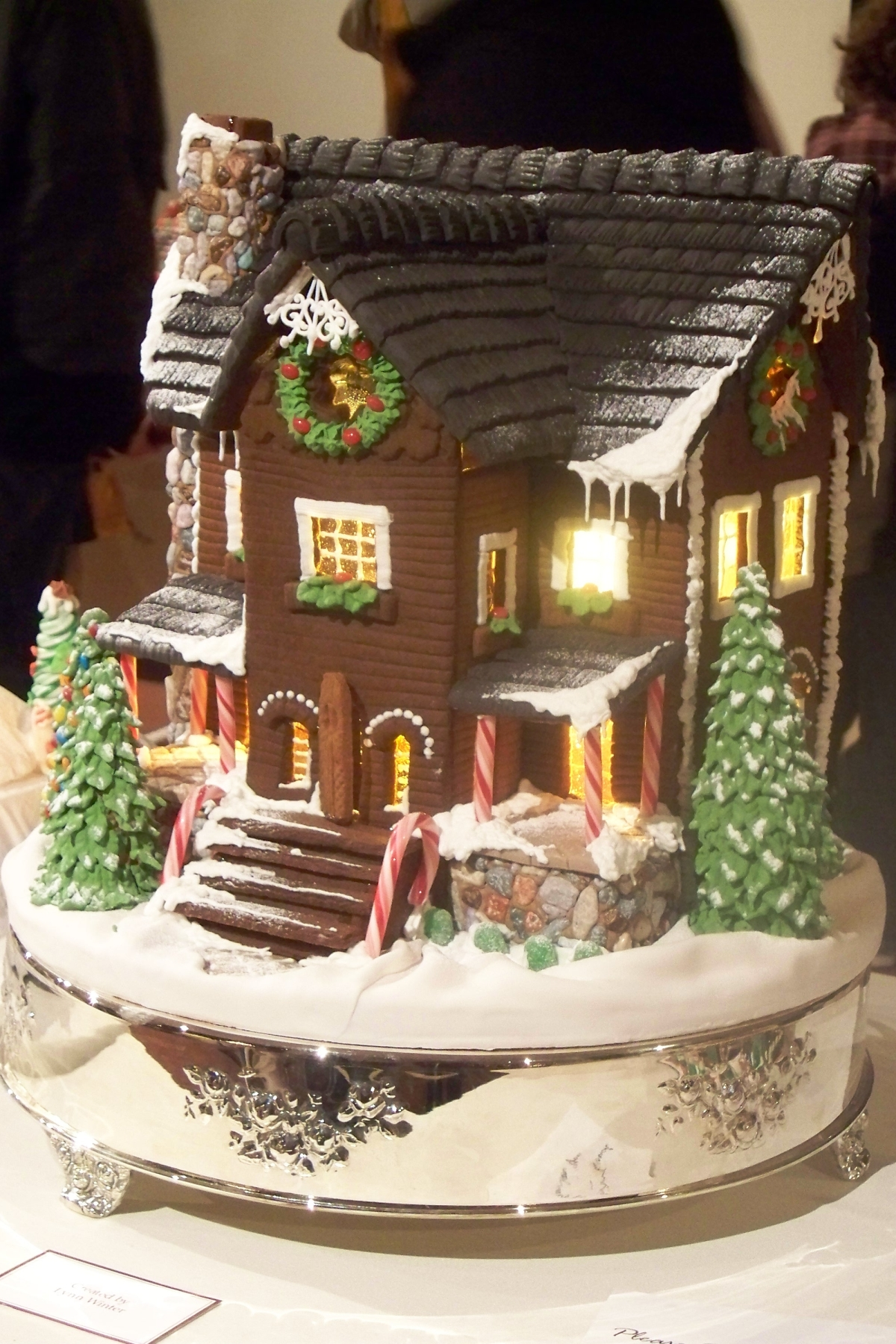
Gingerbread house with steps and trees

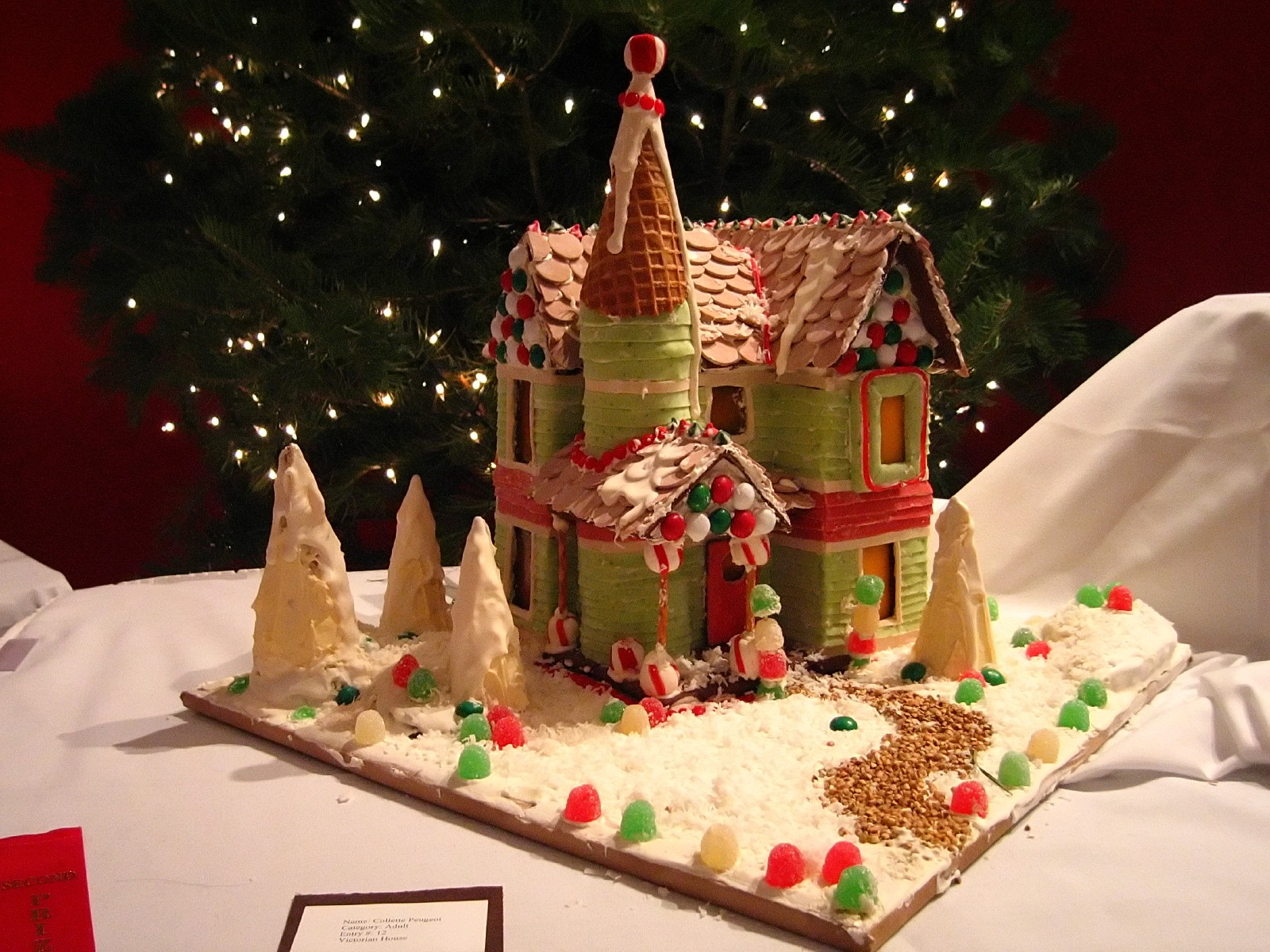
Gingerbread house with path

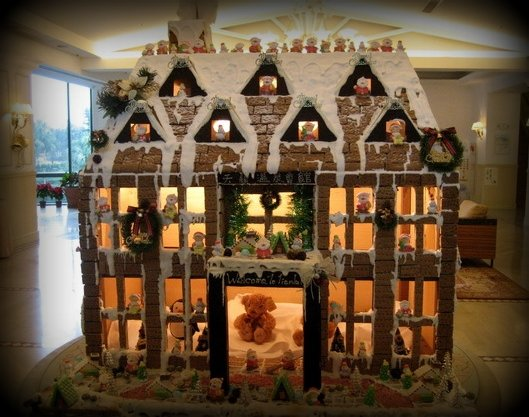
Gingerbread house with lighting

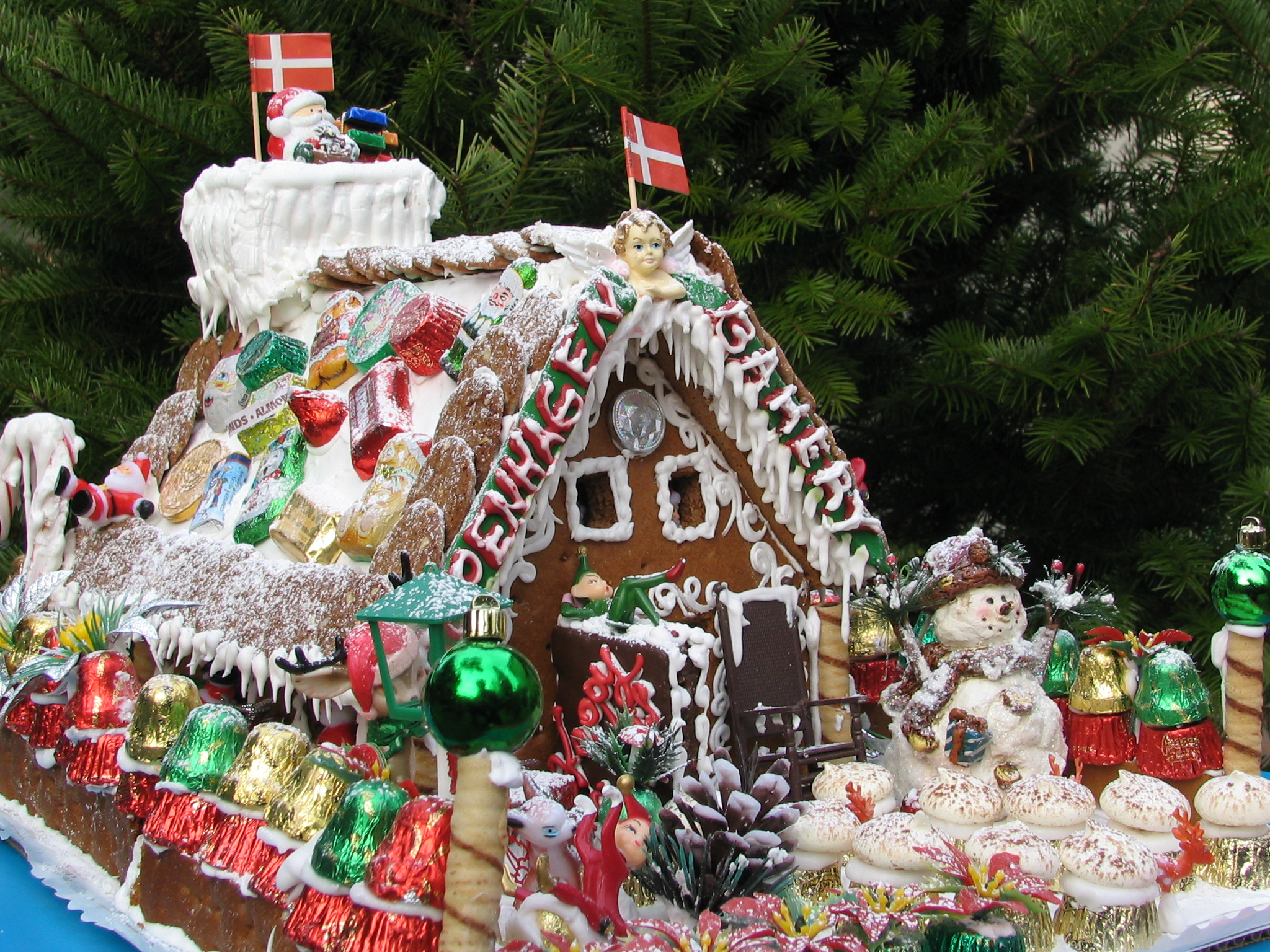
Gingerbread house with snowman

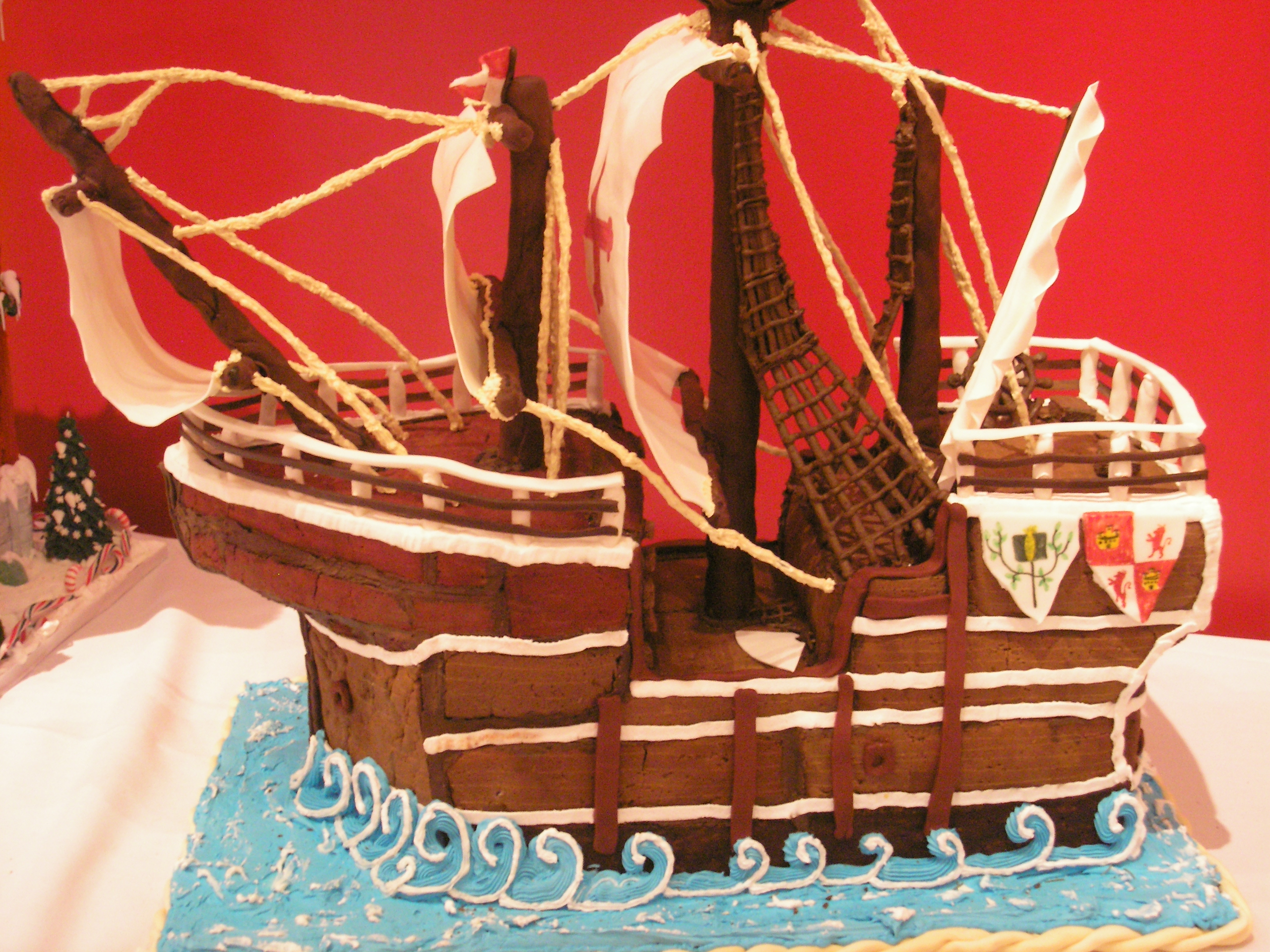
Gingerbread ship

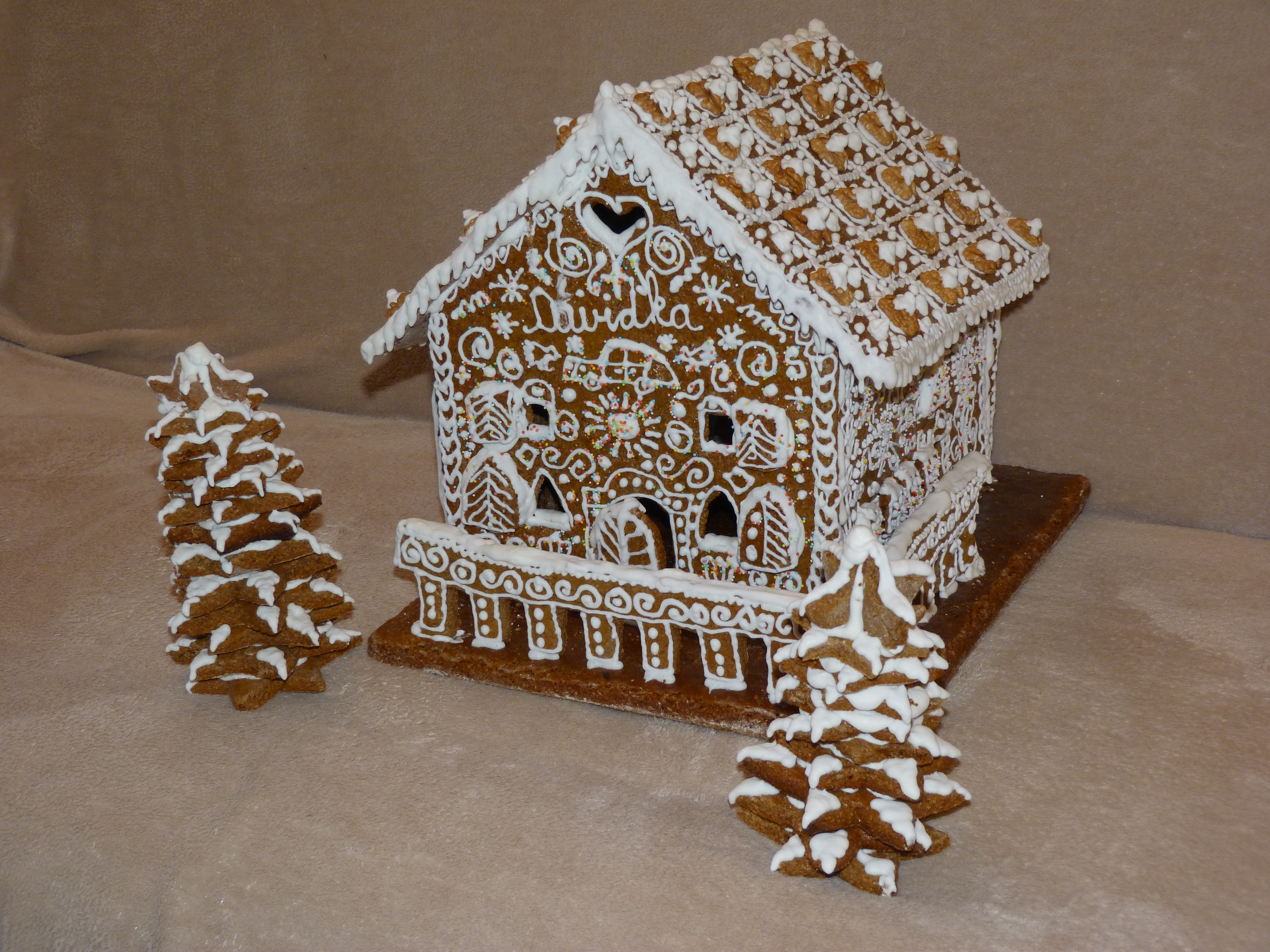
Gingerbread house as a Christmas Eve decoration

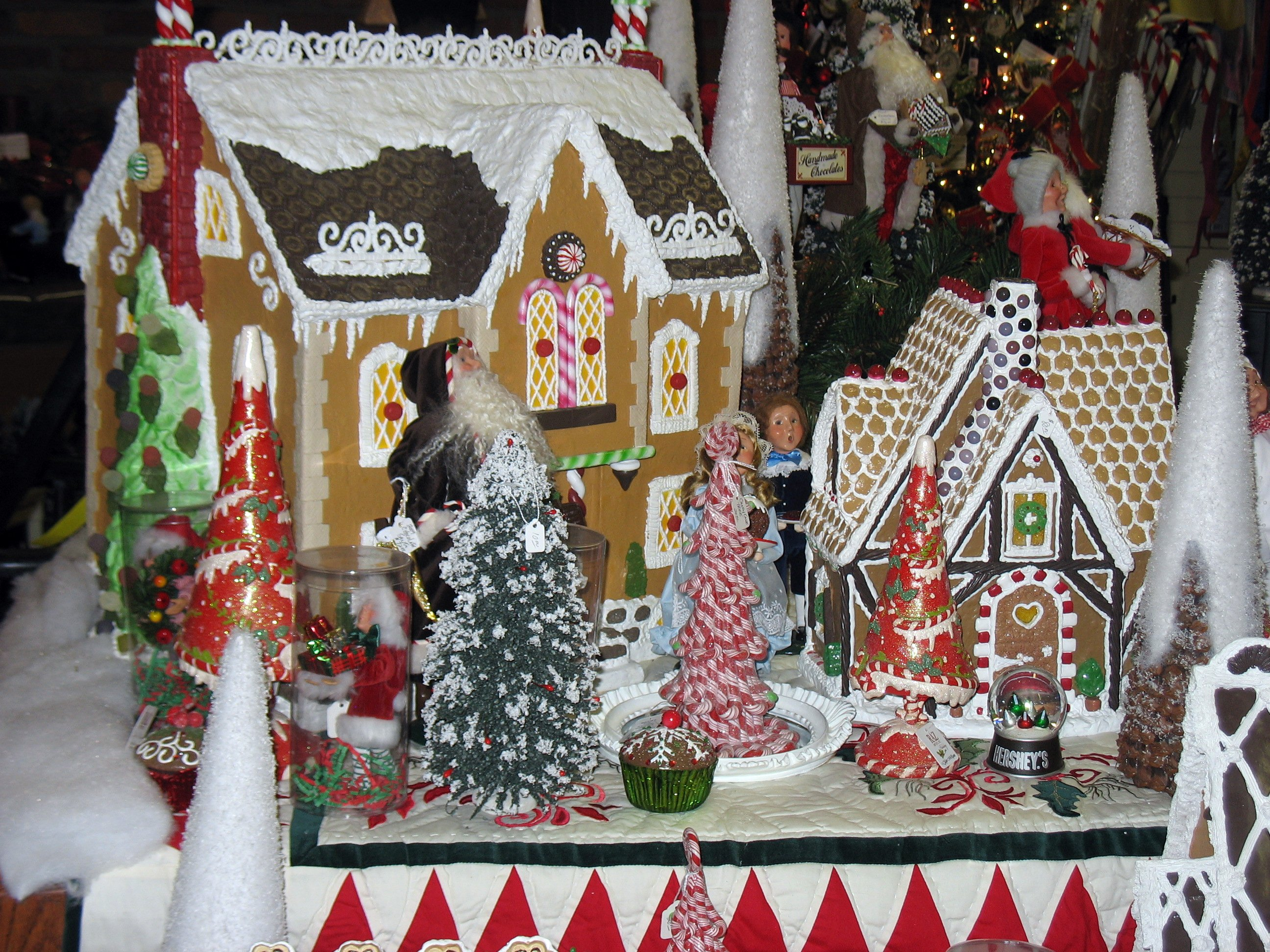
Gingerbread houses with Christmas tree

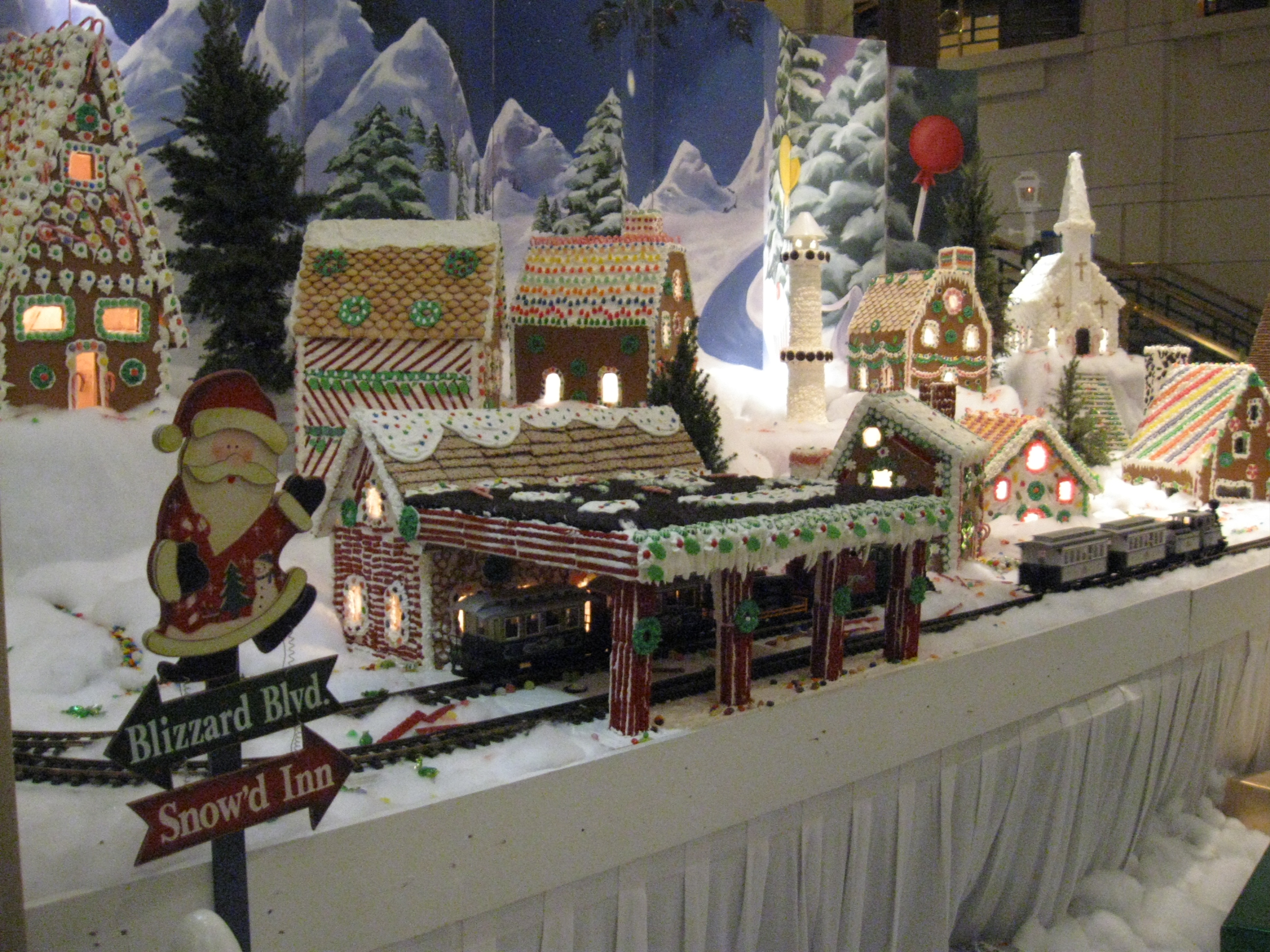
Gingerbread village with model trains

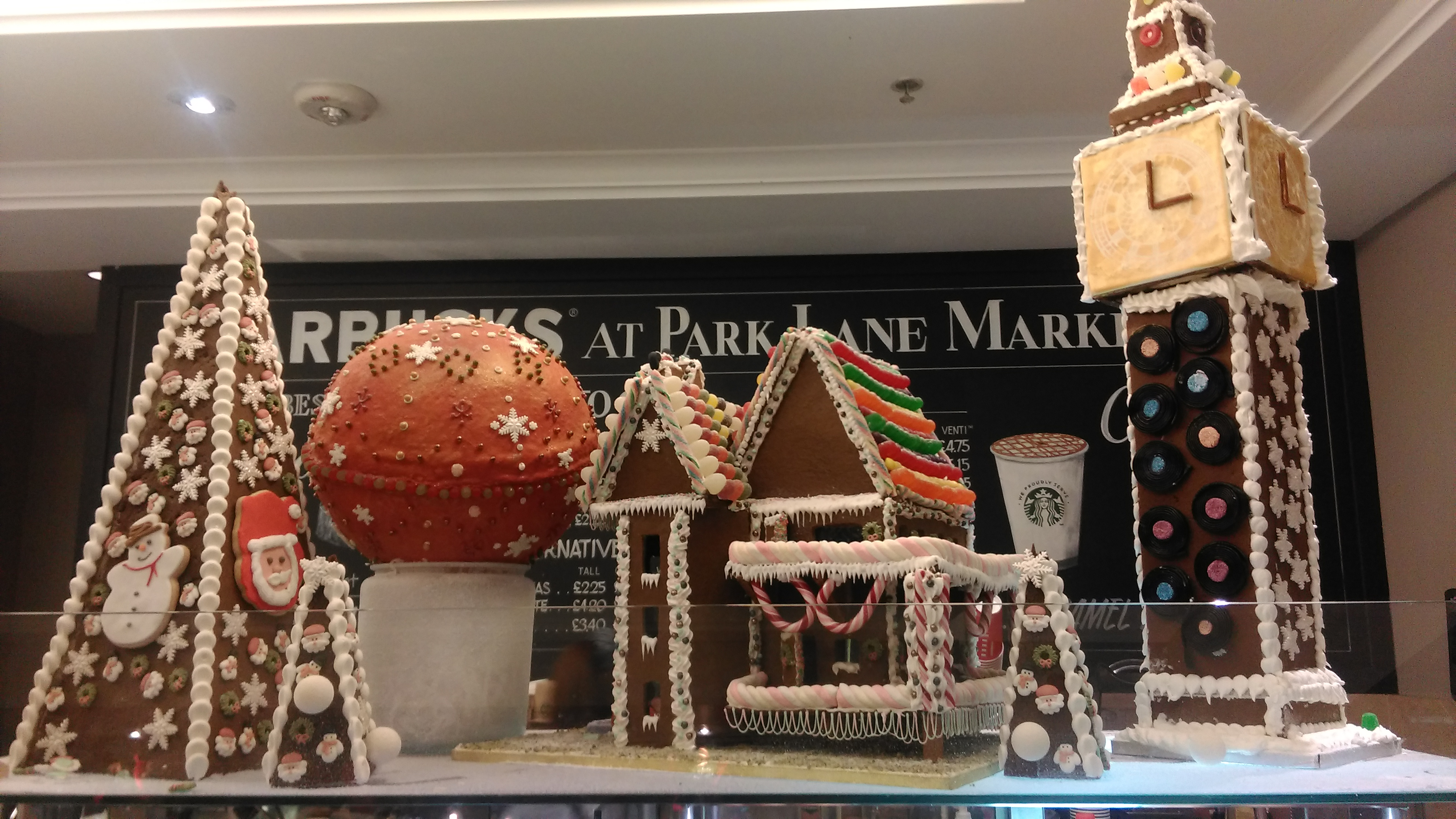
Gingerbread house and Elizabeth Tower in London, United Kingdom

== See also ==
- Gingerbread man
- Lebkuchen
- Aachener Printen
