= John Fleer =

American chef

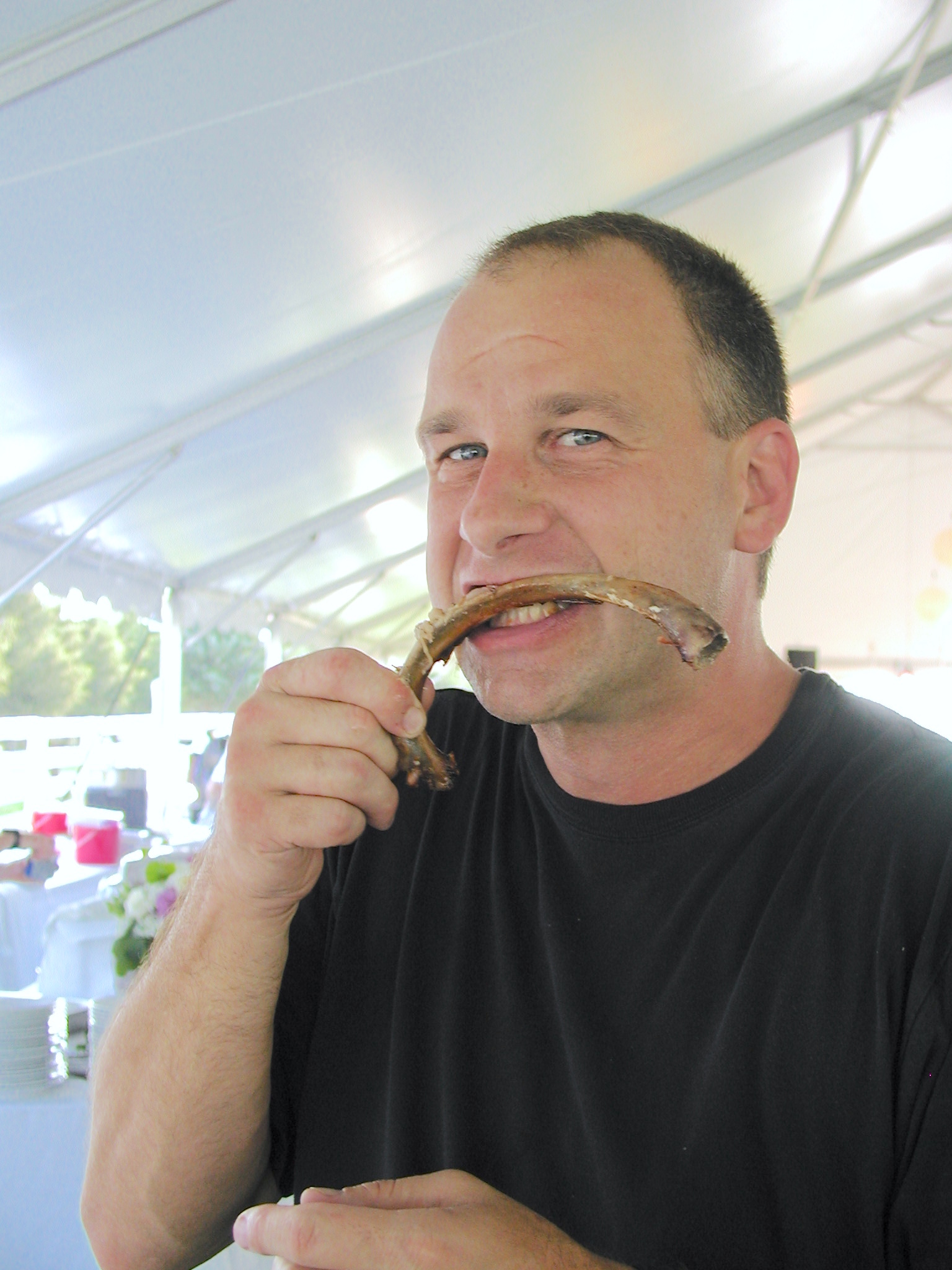
- Fleer in 2008 at the Franklin Food and Spirits Festival in Franklin, Tennessee
- Born: Winston-Salem, North Carolina, U.S.
- Education: Duke University; University of North Carolina at Chapel Hill; The Culinary Institute of America
- Known for: Southern food, Appalachian cuisine
- Culinary career
- Current restaurant(s): The Rhu bakery, Asheville, North Carolina (2016–present)
- Previous restaurant(s): Rhubarb, Asheville, North Carolina (2013–2024); Benne on Eagle, Asheville, North Carolina (2018–2024); Blackberry Farm, Walland, Tennessee (1992–2007); Canyon Kitchen, Cashiers, North Carolina (2009–2015)

John C. Fleer, or "Papa Fleer", is an American chef, cookbook author, and restaurateur. He is known for his contributions to Southern cuisine and Appalachian cuisine. He was a pioneer of farm-to-table cooking. From 1992 until 2007, Fleer was the executive chef at Blackberry Farm, a resort in Walland, Tennessee. Since 2013, Fleer has worked in Asheville, North Carolina.

== Early life and education ==
Fleer grew up in Winston-Salem, North Carolina. During his childhood his mother was a PhD student at North Carolina State University, and later an adult education teacher; his father was a political science professor at Wake Forest University. In childhood he started cooking by making meals for his family.

He received a bachelor's degree in religion from Duke University; followed by graduate-level religion studies at University of North Carolina at Chapel Hill. He studied abroad in Venice, Italy while studying at Duke. While attending his graduate program he worked at a local Italian restaurant in Chapel Hill; he decided to switch from religious to culinary studies and enrolled at the Culinary Institute of America (CIA) in Hyde Park, New York.

== Career ==
While attending CIA, Fleer worked as the personal chef for actress Mary Tyler Moore. His first job after finishing his schooling was as an executive chef at Blackberry Farm, a luxury resort in Walland, Tennessee, where he grew in reputation for his Southern cuisine. He published the cookbook, Blackberry Basics: Recipes from Blackberry Farm (2002). Under Fleer's management, Blackberry Farm was rated by Zagat in 2003 and 2004, as number one small hotel and number two hotel dining in America.

Benne on Eagle was established in December 2018 in an area known as "the Block" in Asheville, and was once a flourishing African-American community known for Appalachian cuisine. The restaurant was designed to celebrate Black cuisine, and Fleer who is White, hired chef Hanan Shabazz, and chef de cuisine Ashleigh Shanti who are Black to help him accomplish this goal. In March 2022, Fleer stepped away from the operations of Benne on Eagle, but still remains an owner.

== Restaurants ==
=== Active ===
- The Rhu, a bakery cafe, Asheville, North Carolina (2016–present)

=== Former ===
- Blackberry Farm, Walland, Tennessee (from 1992 to 2007)
- Canyon Kitchen, Cashiers, North Carolina (2009–2015)
- Rhubarb, Asheville, North Carolina (October 2013–2024)
- Benne on Eagle, The Asheville Foundry Inn, Asheville, North Carolina (December 2018–2024)

== Awards and honors ==
- 2006, Nominee, Best Chefs in America, James Beard Foundation
- 2007, Nominee, Best Chefs in America, James Beard Foundation
- 2011, Nominee, Best Chefs in America, James Beard Foundation
- 2012, Semifinalist, Best Chefs in America, James Beard Foundation
- 2015, Nominee, Best Chefs in America, James Beard Foundation
- 2017, Nominee, Best Chefs in America, James Beard Foundation
- 2020, Semifinalist, Outstanding Chef, James Beard Foundation

== Publications ==
- Fleer, John (2002). Blackberry Basics: Recipes from Blackberry Farm. Blackberry Farm Press.

== See also ==
- Foxfire (magazine), a student-run magazine about Appalachian culture
