= Ashleigh Shanti =

American chef and sommelier (born 1991)

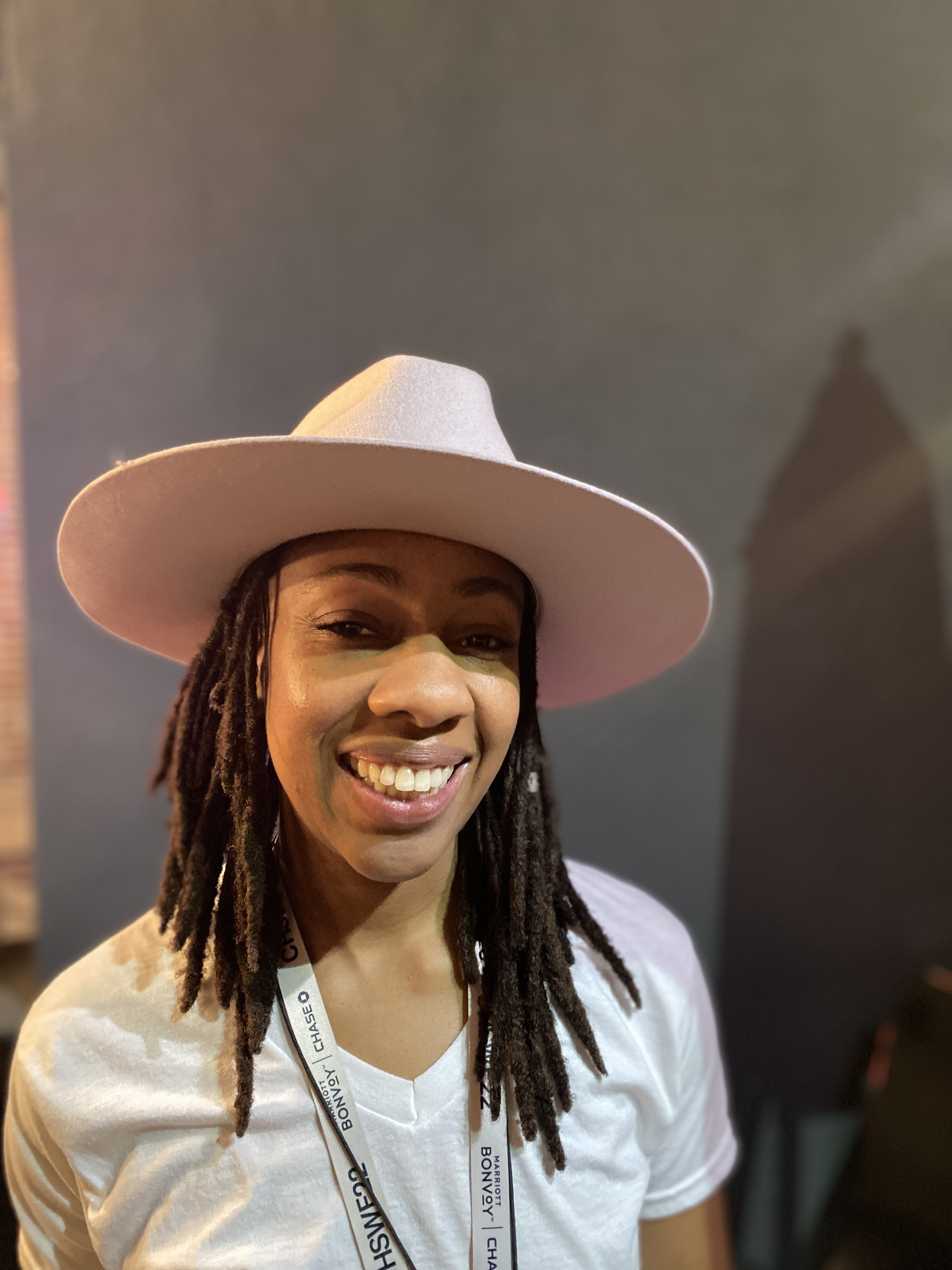
- Born: c. 1991; North Carolina, U.S.
- Education: Hampton University
- Occupations: Chef, sommelier
- Employer: Benne on Eagle
- Known for: Black Appalachian cuisine, soul food, Southern food

Ashleigh Shanti (born circa 1991) is an American chef, sommelier and cookbook author. She is a freelance chef. Shanti specializes in African American foodways, including Black Appalachian cuisine. From 2018 until 2020 she was the chef de cuisine of Benne on Eagle in Asheville, North Carolina.

== Early life and education ==
Shanti is originally from North Carolina. She lived in Nairobi, Kenya for a gap year break from university. Upon her return, she attended Hampton University. After graduating from Hampton, she moved to Baltimore, Maryland to attend culinary school. She eventually earned her sommelier certification.

== Career ==
Early in her career, Shanti worked as a cook and culinary event producer in Virginia Beach, Virginia. After culinary school, she worked for Cindy Wolf at Charleston and Cinghiale in Baltimore, Maryland. She bartended briefly and worked in catering in El Paso, Texas.

For over two years, Shanti worked as Vivian Howard's culinary assistant. Shanti supported Howard's work in A Chef's Life. Shanti appeared alongside Howard in the episode "Dumpling Dilemma" of Howard's television show Somewhere South.

Upon leaving her position with Howard, Shanti began traveling the U.S., struggling to figure out where and what she wanted to do or where she wanted to live. During her travels, she was inspired by her visit to The Grey and a conference in Denmark, where she saw Jeannette Ehlers talk about reclaiming African history. She worked at Minibar, the José Andrés restaurant in Washington, D.C.

During a camping trip to Shenandoah National Park, Shanti saw a display at the visitors center about African Americans in Appalachia. Her grandmother and great-grandmother lived in the Appalachian Mountain. The culmination of the display and her maternal heritage inspired Shanti to begin pursuing Black Appalachian cuisine. This was the focus of her first cookbook, Our South: Black Food Through My Lens, which was published in 2024. The book won a James Beard Award in 2025 for the U.S. Foodways category.

In October 2018, Shanti met John Fleer, owner-chef of Rhubarb. Fleer and Shanti had similar culinary interests: celebrating African and African American culinary traditions. Fleer hired Shanti serve as chef de cuisine and to help create the menu at Benne on Eagle, the restaurant at The Foundry Hotel in Asheville. The restaurant opened in December 2018 and closed in September 2024.

In 2019, Shanti was named one of "16 Black Chefs Changing Food in America" by The New York Times. That same year, she was also named one of Eater's "Young Guns" of the year and Benne on Eagle was named one of Bon Appetit's Best New Restaurants. Shanti was named a semi-finalist for the 2020 James Beard Award for "Rising Star Chef of the Year."

Shanti competed in Top Chef: Houston, the nineteenth season of the television series Top Chef, which aired in 2022.

Her restaurant, Good Hot Fish, a modern-day fish camp was set to open in January 2023 in South Asheville, North Carolina. Shanti was a judge for the National Gingerbread House Competition in 2023.

== Cuisine ==
Shanti's cuisine often explores Black Appalachian food, Southern food and soul food. Her modern interpretations of early Black American food also incorporates West African, Japanese, European and American cuisine.

Examples of dishes created by Shanti includes hummus made with black-eyed peas and sesame; okonomiyaki inspired by her mother's salmon and cabbage fritters; buttermilk cornbread soup, the latter based on her grandmother's recipe; collard greens salad with fried plantain and sumac; farro-vegetable hash with chermoula; cornmeal pancakes with strawberry compote; and benne-seed biscuits with local country ham and hollandaise.

== Personal life ==
Shanti loves rap music and writes rap songs in her free time.
