= Blackberry Farm (resort) =

Luxury resort in Walland, Tennessee

Coordinates: 35.686°N 83.866°W

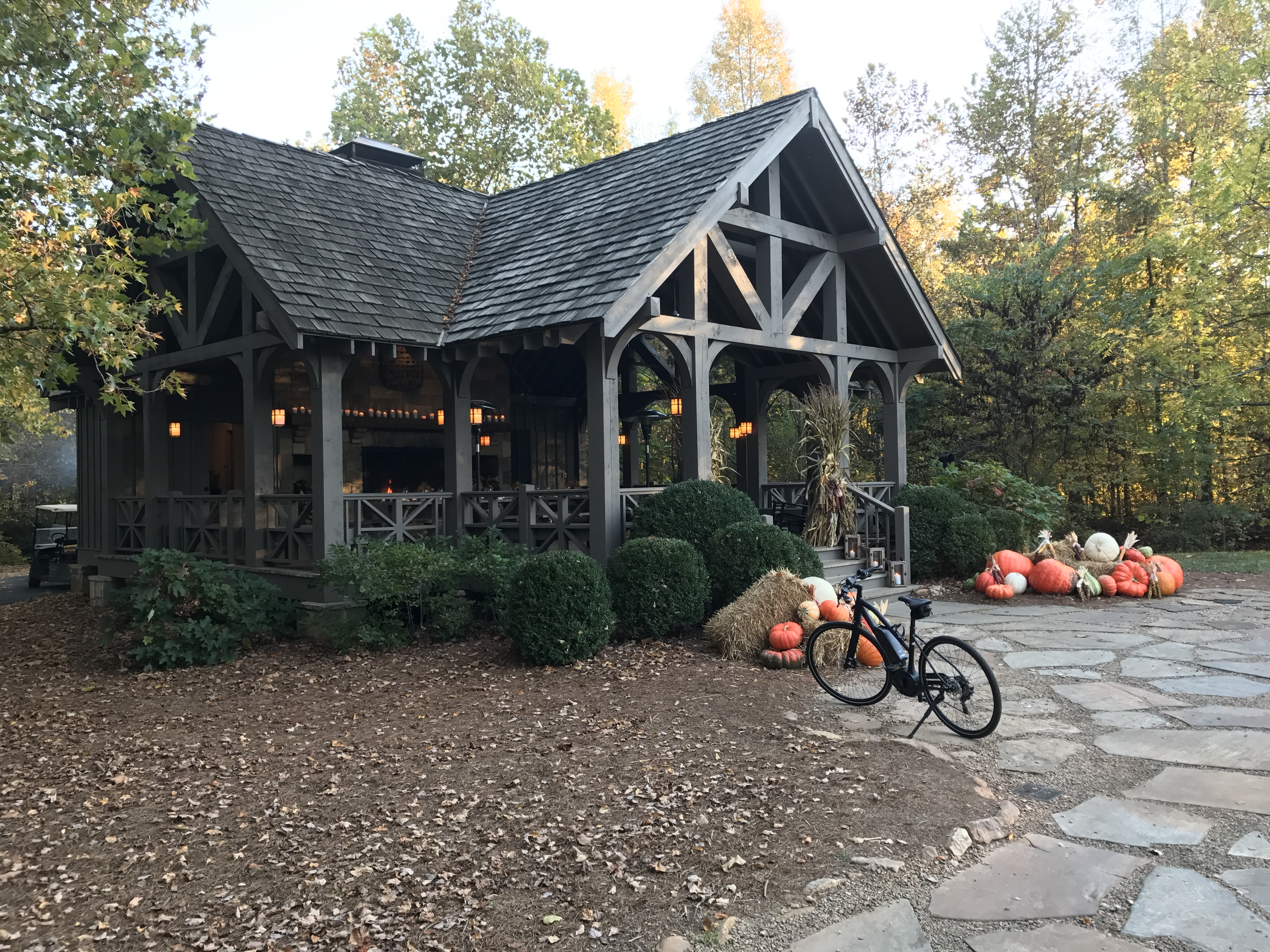
- Founded: 1941
- Headquarters: Walland, Tennessee
- Website: blackberryfarm.com

Blackberry Farm is a luxury 4,200-acre resort in Walland, Tennessee, bordering the Great Smoky Mountains National Park. It was rated the best small hotel in America by Zagat Survey in 2004. Blackberry Farm is part of the Relais & Châteaux association.

== History ==
Blackberry Farm was built by Florida and David Lasier in 1940 and opened in May 1941. In 1952, the Lasiers sold the property to the Jarvis family, who, in 1976, sold it to Ruby Tuesday restaurant founder Sandy Beall and his wife Kreis. In 1990, they turned the property into a hotel, initially with six rooms. Their son Sam Beall became proprietor in 2002 and served as its owner until his death in 2016.

From 1992 to 2007, John Fleer served as executive chef of the restaurant. Blackberry Farm was rated by Zagat in 2003 and 2004 as number one small hotel and number two hotel dining in America. Joseph Lenn previously served as the resort's executive chef.

In February 2019, Blackberry Farm opened Blackberry Mountain, a 5,200-acre forested area with hiking and biking trails along with lodging.

== Property ==
The grounds cover 4,200 acres (1,700 ha), and the resort has 62 rooms. Blackberry Farm hosts culinary, musical, and outdoor sporting activities and events on and off property. The property includes a timber-frame barn from Pennsylvania, a dining and entertainment venue, a spa, an events hall, and guest cottages.

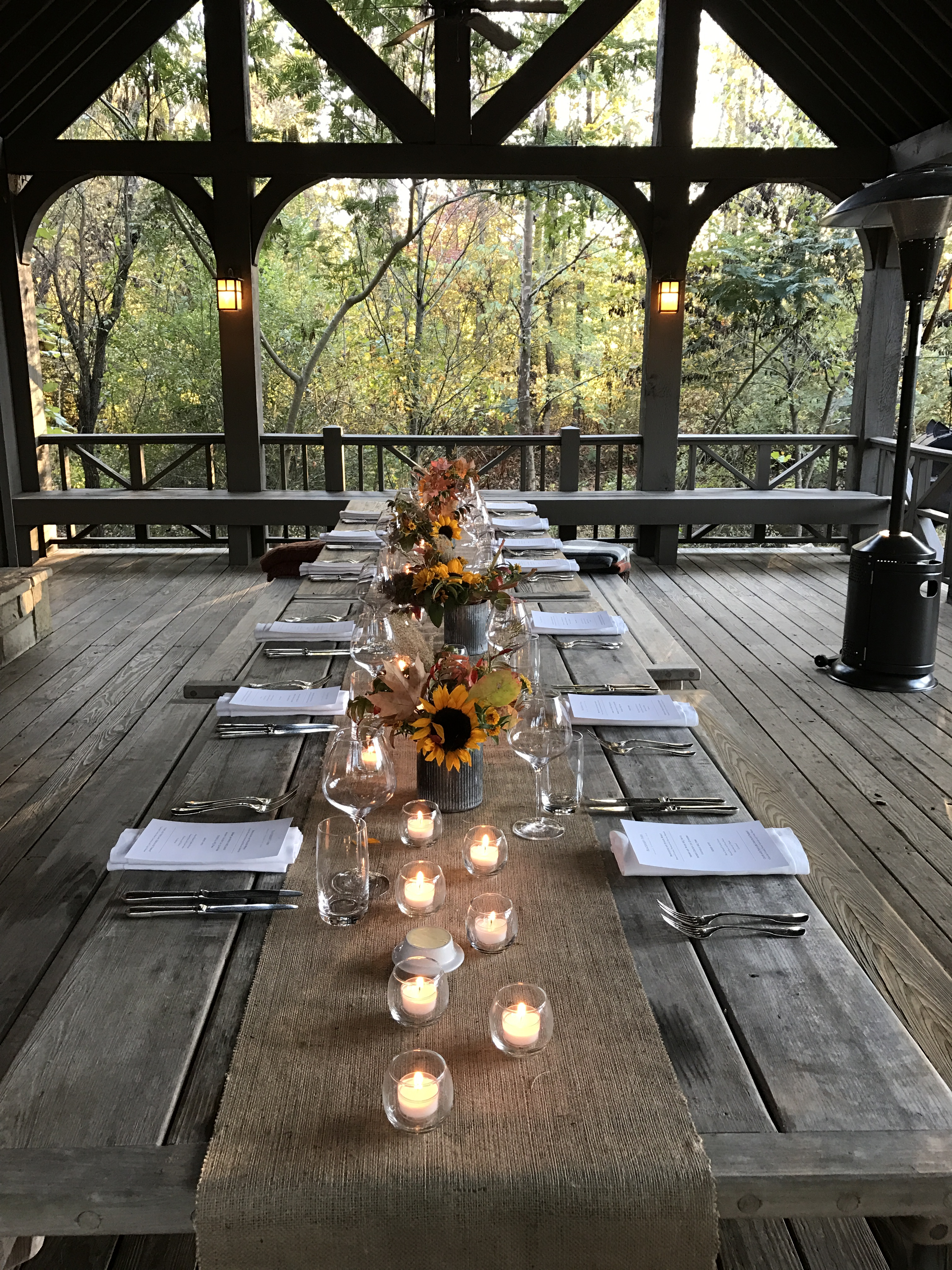

== Notable events ==
Country music singer Jennifer Nettles of Sugarland was married at Blackberry Farm on November 26, 2011. Kelly Clarkson and her former husband, Brandon Blackstock were married there on October 20, 2013. On April 23, 2022, golfer Dustin Johnson married Paulina Gretzky, daughter of Wayne Gretzky, on the property.

== Publications ==
- Fleer, John (2002). Blackberry Basics: Recipes from Blackberry Farm. Blackberry Farm Press.
- Beall, Sam (2012). The Foothills Cuisine of Blackberry Farm: Recipes and Wisdom from Our Artisans, Chefs, and Smoky Mountain Ancestors. Clarkson Potter. ISBN 9780307886774.
