= National Bakery School =

Culinary school in London, England

Coordinates: 51.49814°N 0.10154°W

The National Bakery School, a culinary school at London South Bank University, London, England, was founded in 1894 and is now the world's oldest bakery school.

== History ==
In December 1893, Sir Philip Magnus, a governor of the Borough Polytechnic Institute, now London South Bank University, proposed that a bakery school should be set up at the Polytechnic. During the following year Magnus visited a private bakery school run by a Mr John Blandy in Uxbridge (established 1889). He was impressed enough to invite Blandy to the Polytechnic for his advice on setting up a school for the technical and practical training of bakers. The scheme was approved by the London County Council Education Board in April 1894 and funds granted. On 10 October 1894 evening classes for Bakers and Confectioners were opened by Mr Henry C Kutz, President of the London Master Bakers' Protection Society.

By 1898 bakers were the largest group in the Borough Polytechnic Institute's student body (142 students) and the success prompted John Blandy to propose that a national bakery school should be set up at the Polytechnic. The proposal prompted the National Association of Master Bakers (founded 1887) to take over the management of the Polytechnic's Bakery School on 25 September 1899 at their own cost. The bakery school was from then on formally known as the National School of Bakery and Confectionary.

The School continued its evening classes but now put a focus on its full-time day students, of whom six enrolled in the first term. On 5 February 1902 the foundation stone of new bakery buildings was laid by Thomas Fletcher of Birmingham Town Council, with John Humphry, president of the National Association of Master Bakers and Adam Lawson Johnston, chairman of the Committee present. On 9 September of that year, the School's new buildings were opened by Alderman Francis Tonsley JP, president of the National Association of Master Bakers, supported by the mayors of Northampton and Southwark, the chairman of the Institute and its governing body. Mr John Kirkland was appointed head of department in the same year. On 10 September 1909 the new day session of the National School for Bakers and Confectioners was opened by the Lord Mayor of London, Sir George Wyatt Truscott with 44 full-time students.

The first fourteen female bakery students were admitted in April 1916. In 1927 John Kirkland left his position as head of department and a lecture theatre was named after him, which is still is use. During World War II Mr Bennion the School's Head was seconded to the Ministry of Food to advise on rationing and the use of potato flour in baked goods. A higher diploma in Baking Technology was introduced in 1947 and in the following year the School made a silver wedding anniversary cake for King George VI and Queen Elizabeth as well as the christening cake for the infant Prince Charles.

In 1958 the Bakery Department won the grand prix d'excellence and a gold medal at the Brussels International Confectioners' Exhibition. In 1960 a member of the Department's staff, Miss Joan Russell designed one of the wedding cakes accepted for the wedding of Her Royal Highness Princess Margaret and Mr. Antony Armstrong Jones. The Worshipful Company of Bakers Hall on Harp Lane was officially opened by the Lord Mayor of London in 1963 and the Bakery Department were invited to provide the peppercorn rent of three white and three brown loaves for the Bakers Company to provide to the Lessors of the Hall at a new annual event. In 1965 the National Bakery Students' Society celebrated it Diamond Jubilee with a sherry party held at the Borough Polytechnic's Edric Hall. In that same year the Lord Mayor of London was presented with special pieces of bread made by students of the department, which were delivered by hand cart to Mansion House, where the Mayor and Lady Mayoress received students for afternoon tea.

From 1969 the National Bakery School moved to purpose built accommodation within new extension buildings of the then Polytechnic of the South Bank, which were opened by Prince Philip, Duke of Edinburgh. In 1989 the School yet again baked a cake for a major celebration, this time marking the 800th anniversary of the office of Lord Mayor of London. The cake which stood nearly three metres tall featured a model of Dick Whittington and his cat.

In 1992 the School pioneered a BSc (Hons) in Baking Technology and Process Management – a first in the UK. The National Bakery School celebrated its centenary in 1994, holding a celebration lunch at Mansion House and publishing a book of recipes submitted by staff and students of South Bank University called 'The Lightest Chocolate Mousse in the World'. During the 1990s John Marchant became Head of the National Bakery School, which ran until 2010, the Tower Restaurant, which was used to train students, sell food produced by the School and for formal dining at the London South Bank University.

From September 2000 the School introduced foundation degrees in Baking Technology Management. During 2004 bakery students worked with designer Jean Paul Gaultier to recreate some of his iconic designs in bread. Another interesting commission was received in 1996 when artist Sharon Baker asked to bake bread in life-size moulds she had had made by lifecast artists CJ Munn and Andre Masters of herself. The finished body-shaped bread was presented to the audience at the art event 'Eat Me' which formed part of the annual London Thames Festival.
