= Royal icing =

Hard icing made from powdered sugar and egg whites

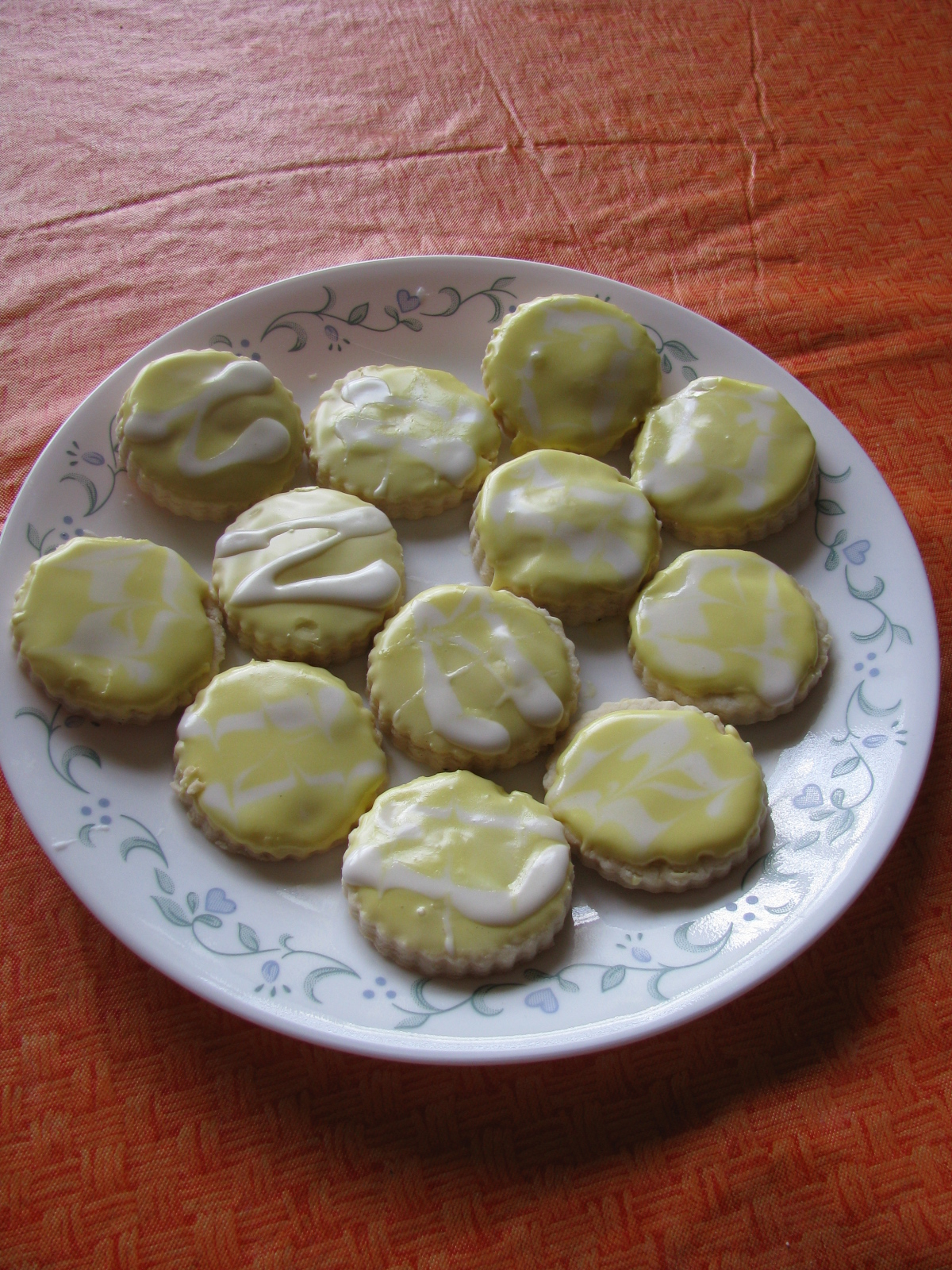
- Lemon shortbread cookies with lemon royal icing
- Type: Icing
- Main ingredients: Egg whites, powdered sugar, sometimes lemon or lime juice

Royal icing is a hard white icing, made from softly beaten egg whites, icing sugar (powdered sugar), and sometimes lemon or lime juice. It is used to decorate Christmas cakes, wedding cakes, gingerbread houses, cookies, and many other cakes and biscuits. It is used either as a smooth covering or in sharp peaks. Glycerine is often added to prevent the icing from setting too hard. When placing icing on cakes, marzipan is usually used under the royal icing in order to prevent discoloration of the icing.

Usual proportions are two egg whites to 1 tsp (5 mL) of lemon juice, 1 tsp (5 mL) of glycerine, and around 1 pound (450 g) of sugar depending on the application.

As well as coating cakes and biscuits, royal icing is used to make decorations such as flowers and figures for putting on the cake. The royal icing is piped into shapes which are allowed to harden on a non-stick surface. These can then be arranged to create edible decorative effects on a variety of sweet foods. The glycerine must be omitted for this purpose. Royal icing is often used to create snow scenes but is also used as an edible adhesive – particularly for gingerbread houses.

== Health risk ==
Royal icing is traditionally prepared with raw egg whites, which have a very small chance of transmitting salmonella poisoning. Meringue powder or ready-to-use, pasteurized, refrigerated egg whites (wet eggs) can be used with similar results. Aquafaba is a vegan alternative to egg whites that is often used in egg-free royal icing.

== History ==
The Oxford English Dictionary gives the first mention of royal icing as Borella's Court and Country Confectioner (1770). The term was well-established by the early 19th century, although William Jarrin (1827) still felt the need to explain that the term was used by confectioners (so presumably it was not yet in common use among mere cooks or amateurs). It developed at some stage in the early 18th century, replacing earlier styles of icing which generally involved making a meringue-like concoction that was then dried out in the mouth of an oven. Elizabeth Raffald (1769) is generally credited with the addition of a layer of marzipan between it and the cake beneath. Piping with royal icing came along a little later, in the 1840s, driven by German culinary innovators. Prior to that, decoration was usually of moulded pastillage or sugarpaste.

There is a myth that it was named royal after it gained widespread publicity when images of Victoria and Albert's bride cake (wedding cake) were circulated, but this is untrue, not least because the real boost came when images of their eldest daughter's wedding cake were published in papers such as The Illustrated London News (not founded until 1842), by which time the name had been in use for over 80 years.

== Gallery ==
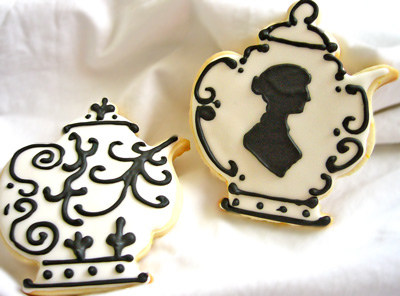
Black and white royal icing cookies

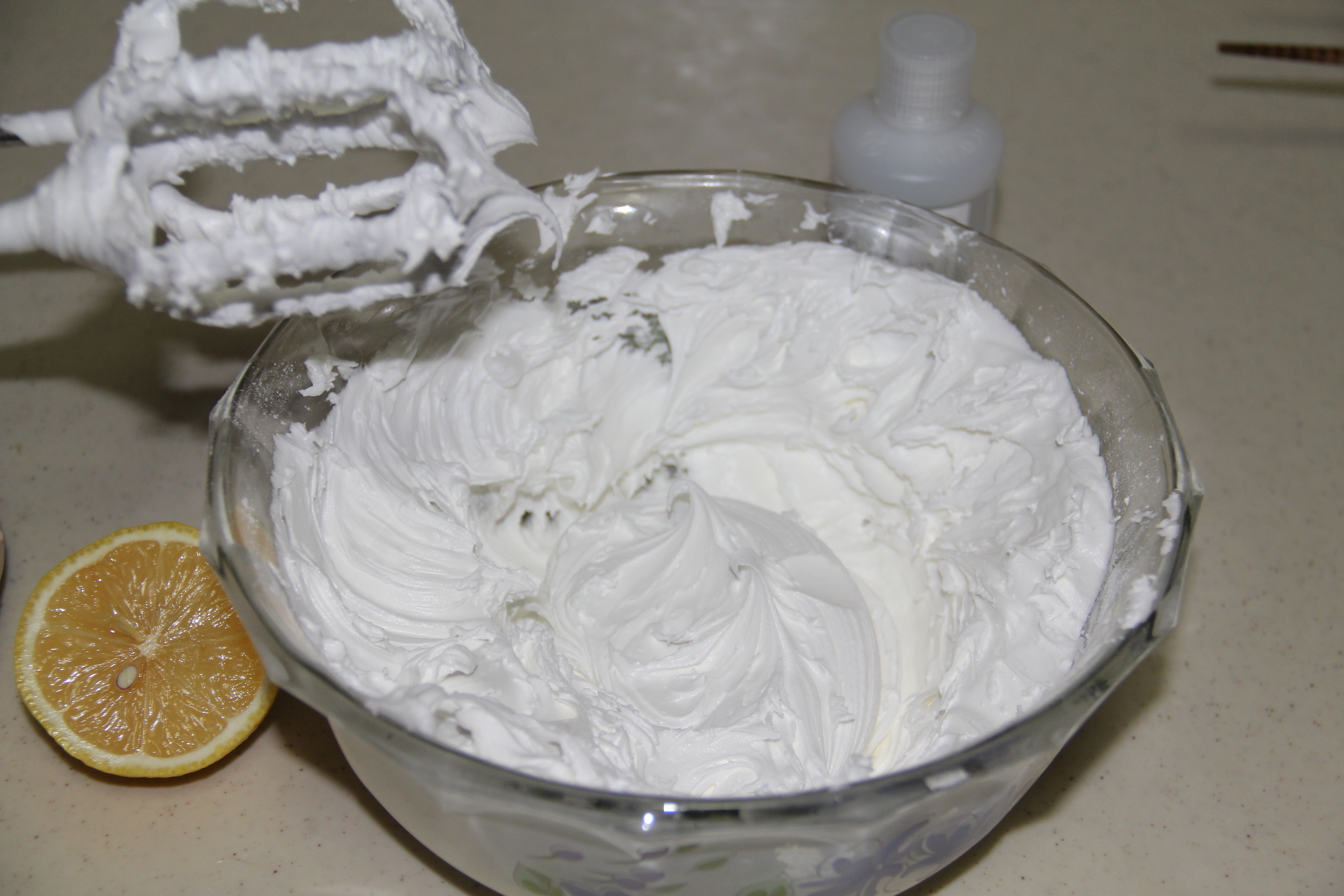
Making royal icing

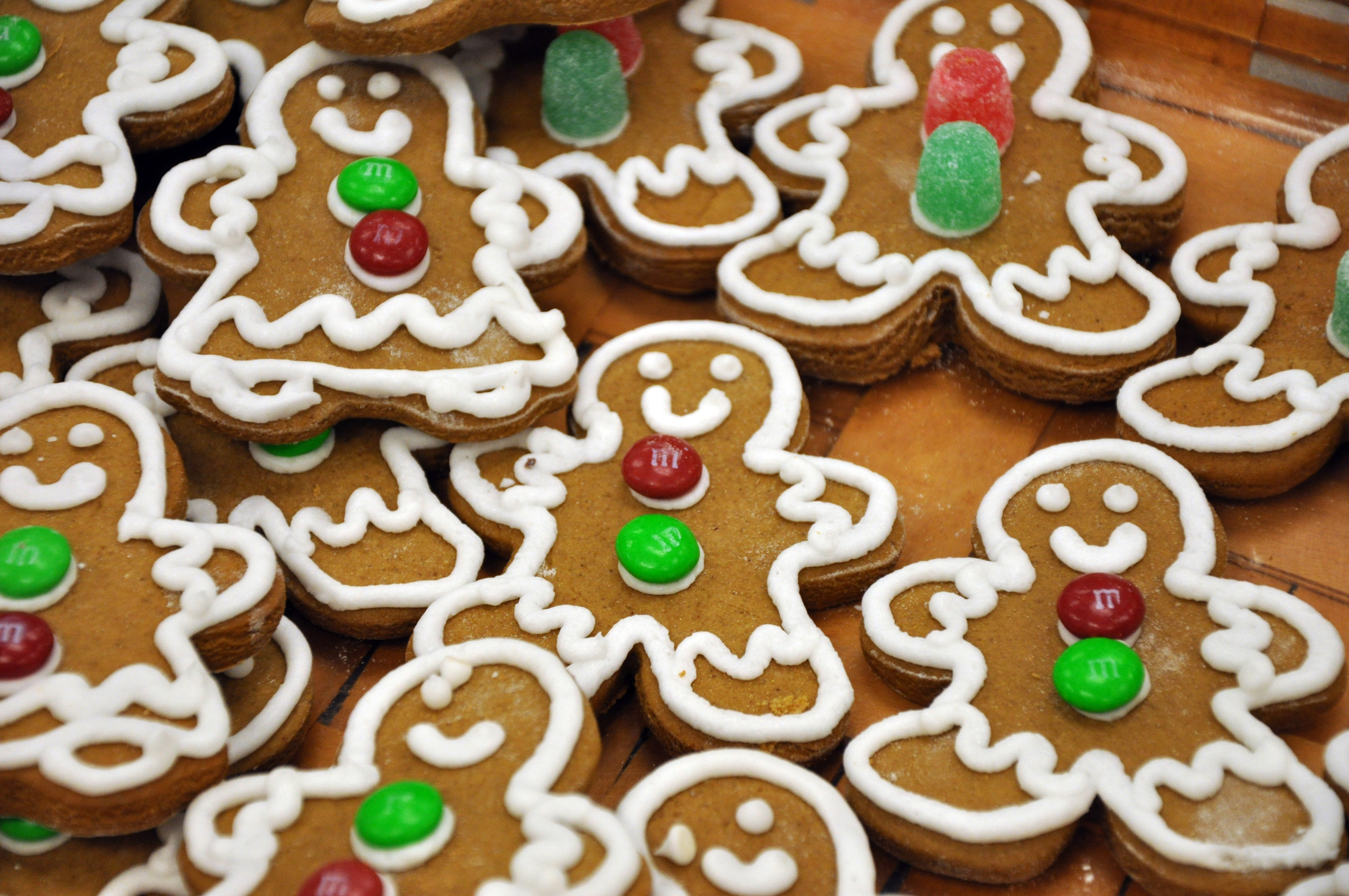
Decorating gingerbread with royal icing

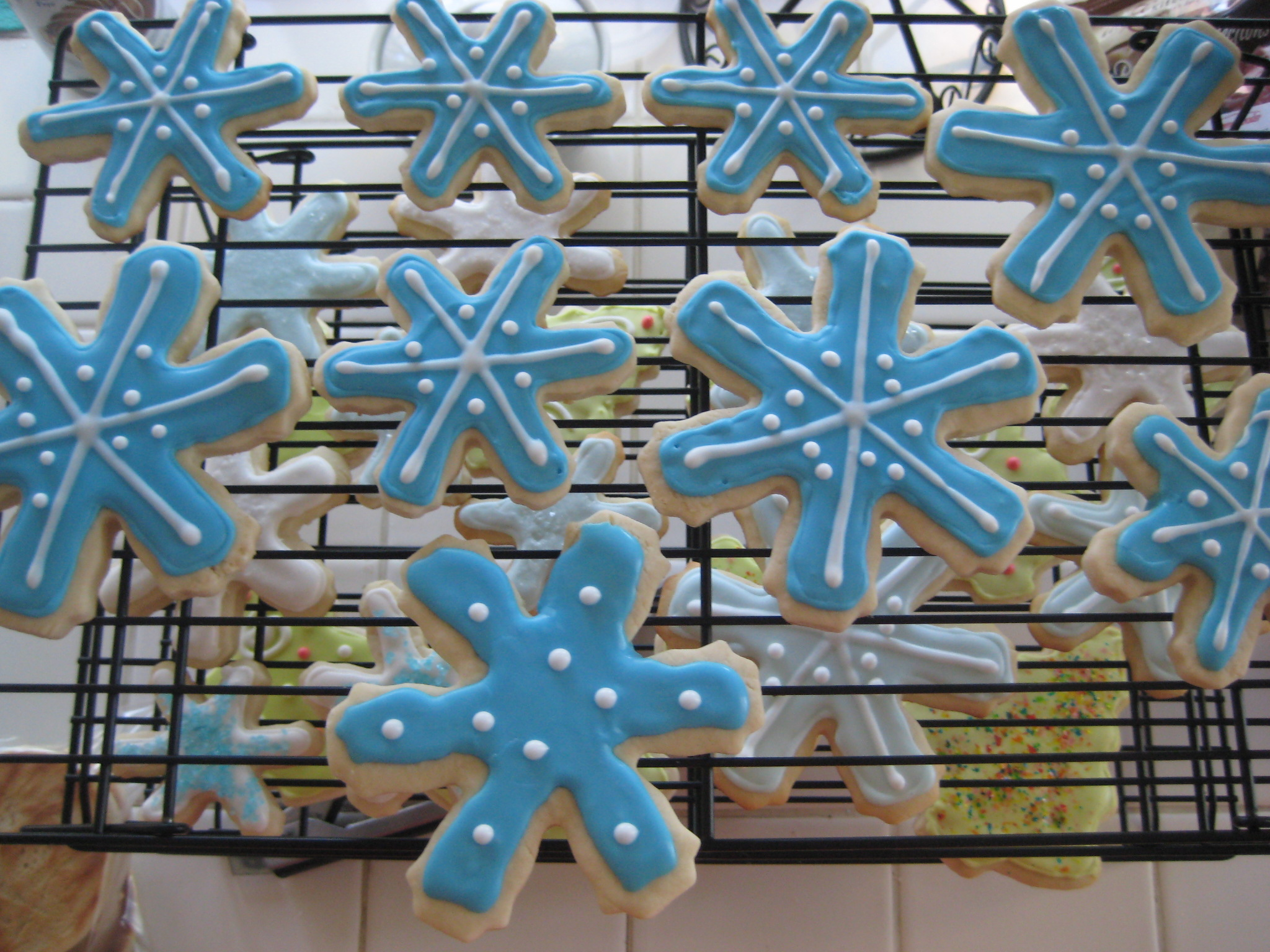
Blue royal icing cookies

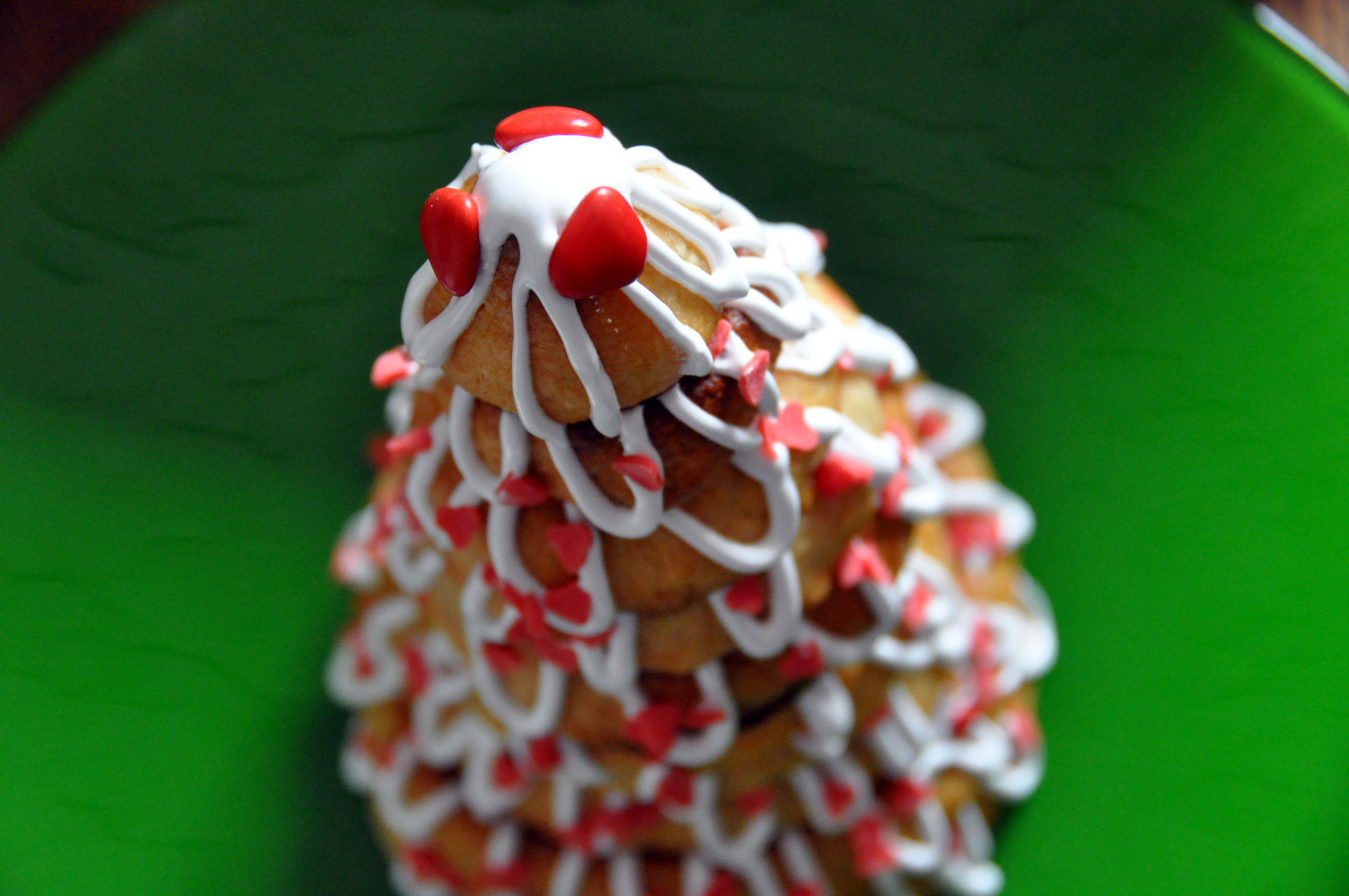
Kransekage decorated with royal icing

== See also ==
- Dough
- Fondant icing
- Ganache
