= Appalachian cuisine =

U.S. regional cuisine

Woman preparing "poke sallet" made of pokeweed (or Phytolacca americana)

Appalachian cuisine is a style of cuisine located in the central and southern sections of the Appalachian Mountains of the Eastern United States. It is an amalgam of the diverse foodways, specifically among the British, German and Italian immigrant populations, Native Americans including the Cherokee people, and African-Americans, as well as their descendants in the Appalachia region.

== About ==
The cuisine of Appalachia focuses on seasonal local ingredients and practices like pickling, foraging, canning and food preserving. Appalachian cuisine is a subset of Southern cuisine, and is specifically different because of the cold winters and the mountainous landscape. Promoters of Appalachian foodways include Eliot Wigginton, Ronni Lundy, John Fleer, Lora Smith, Kendra Bailey Morris, Travis Milton, Ashleigh Shanti, Malinda Russell, and Sean Brock.

== History ==
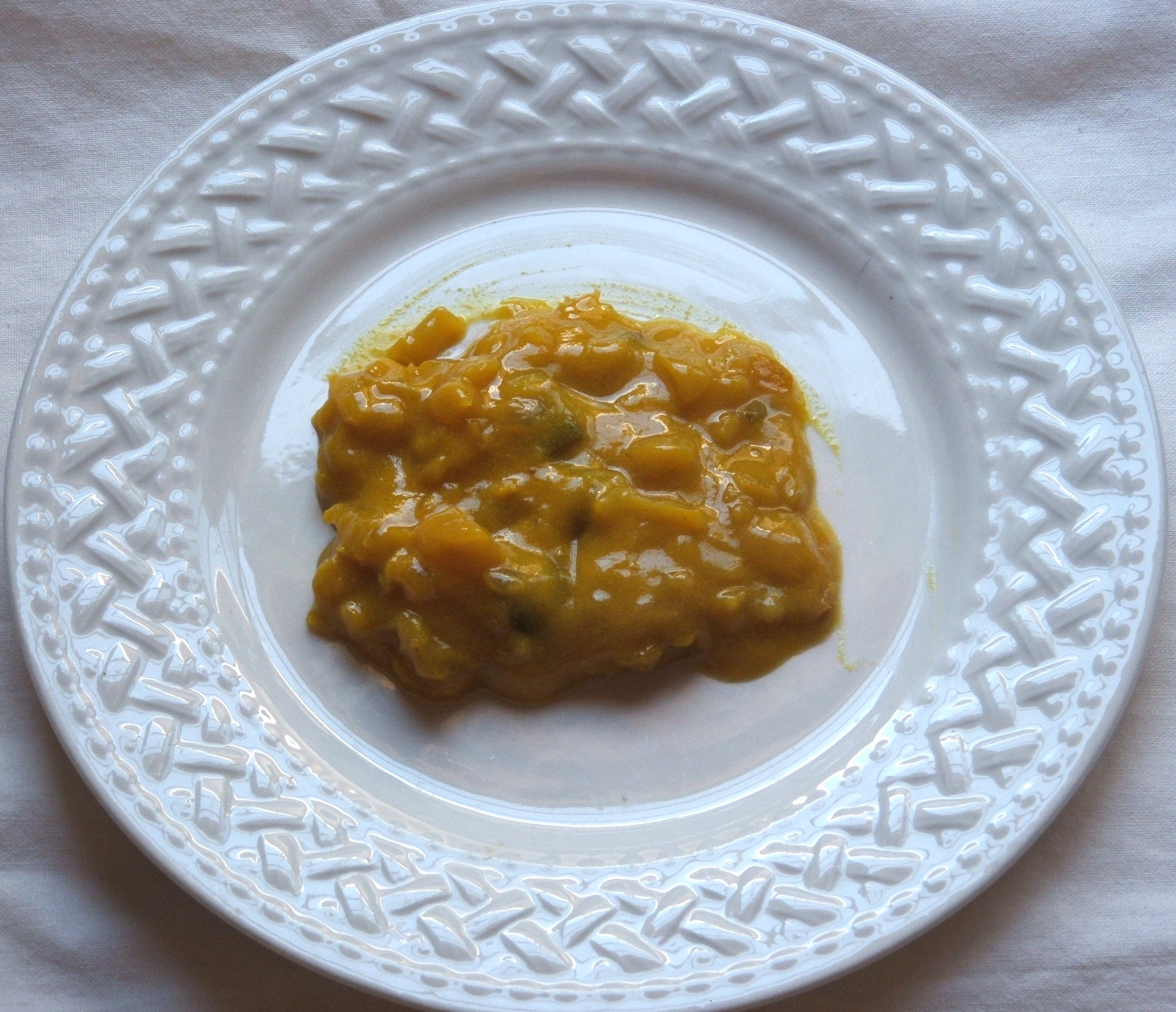
Chow chow

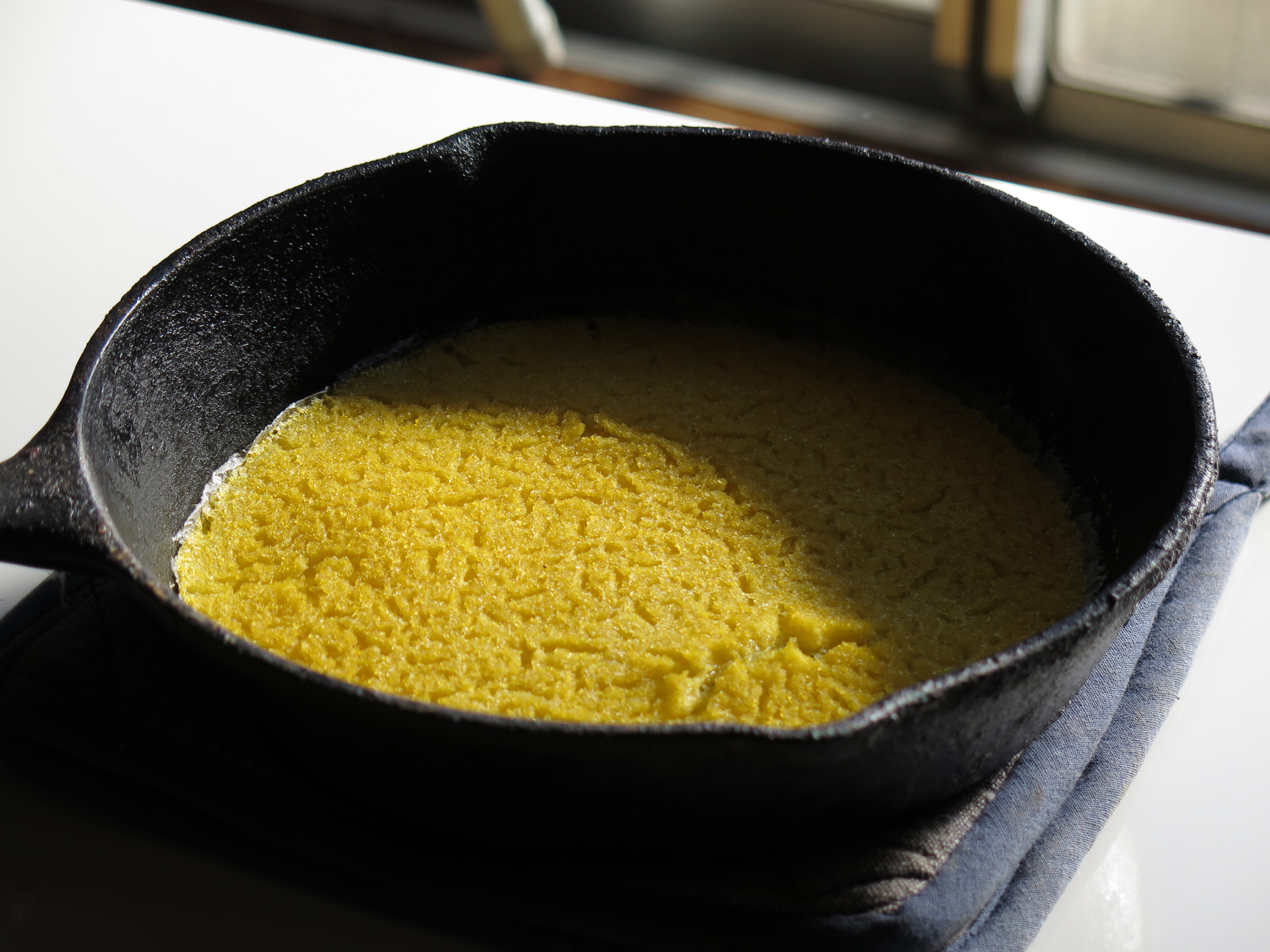
Johnnycakes in a cast iron fry pan

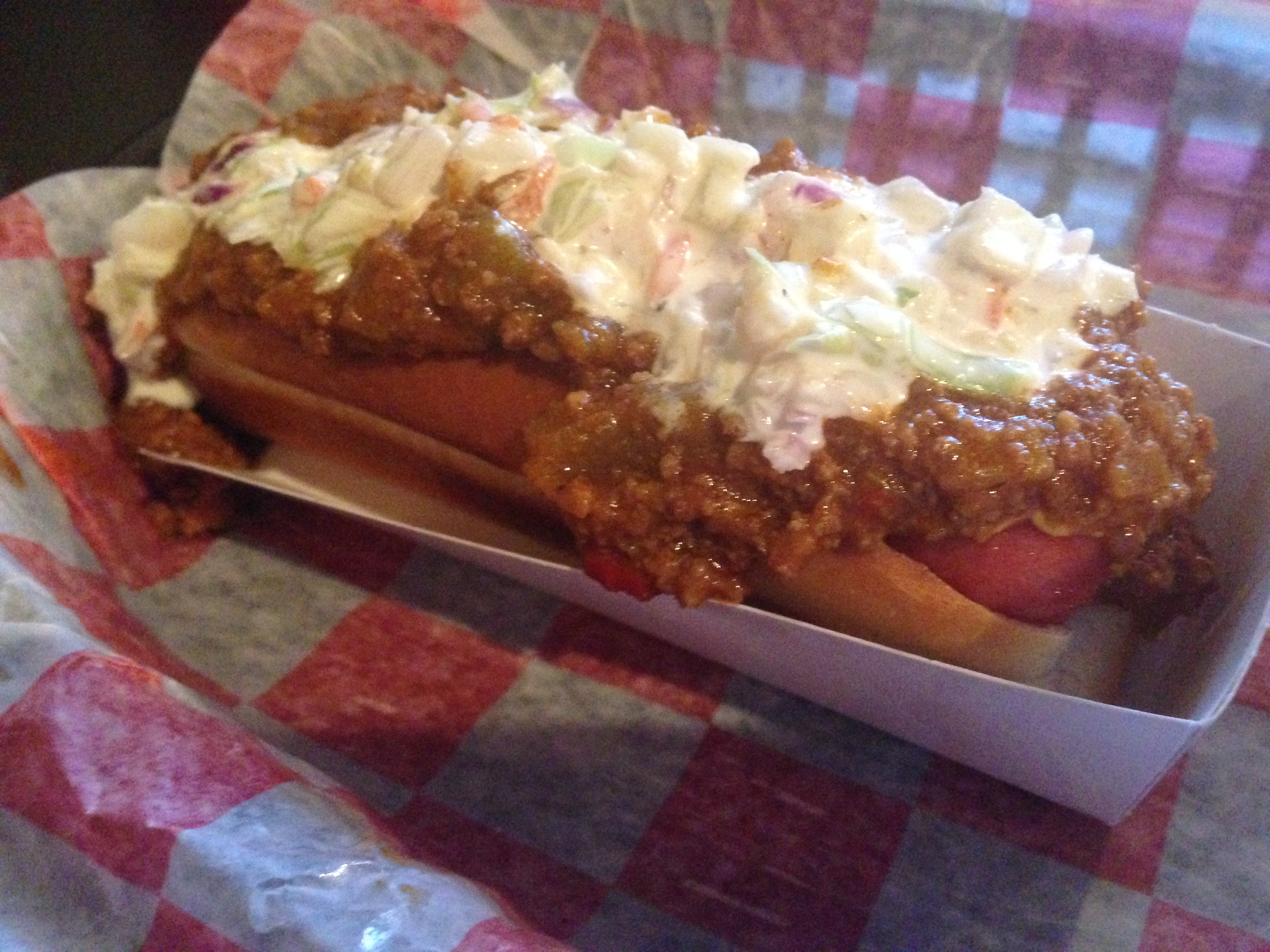
"slaw dog", a West Virginia-style hot dog with coleslaw and chili topping

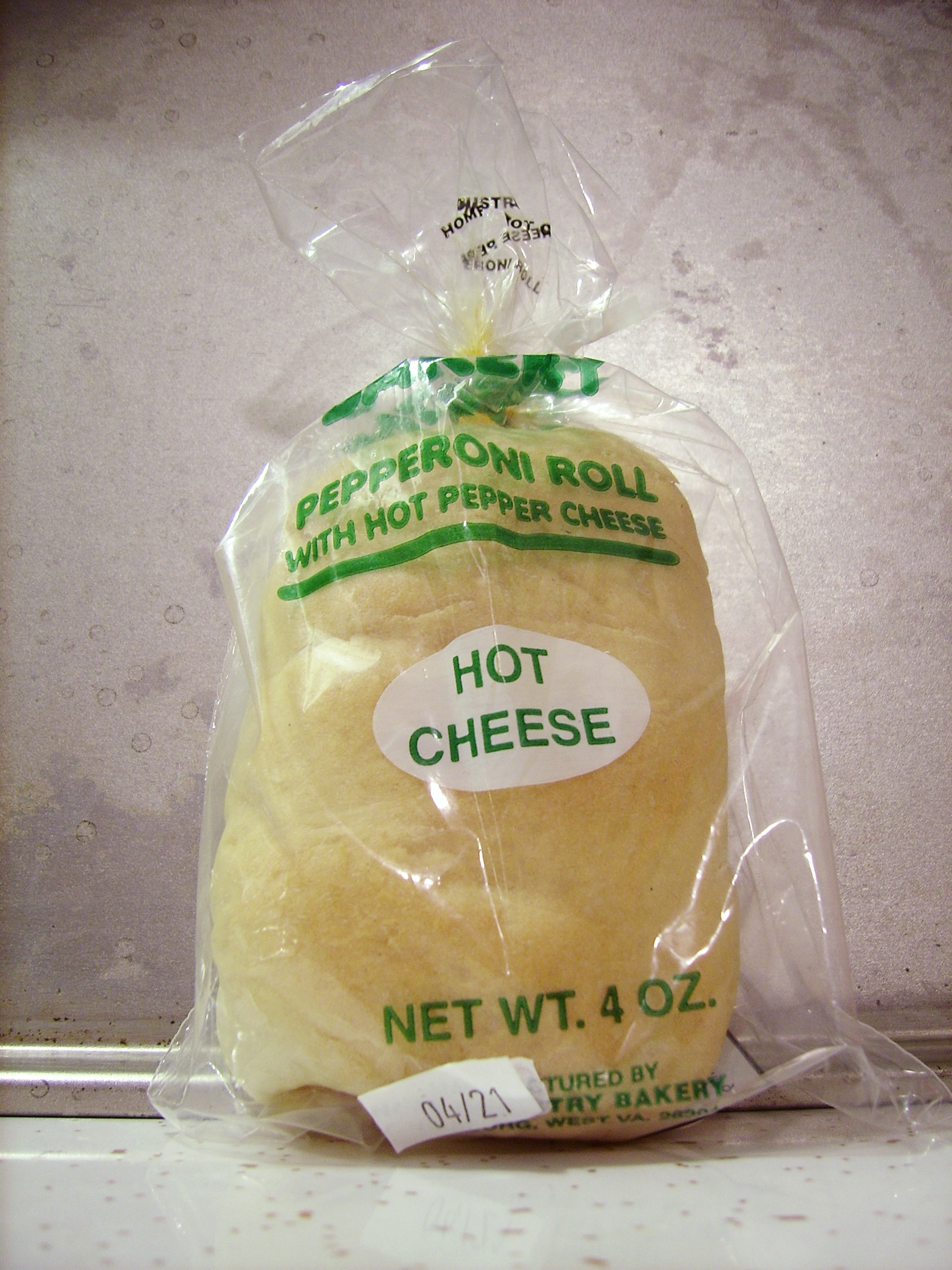
Pepperoni roll with hot pepper cheese from Home Industry Bakery of Clarksburg, West Virginia

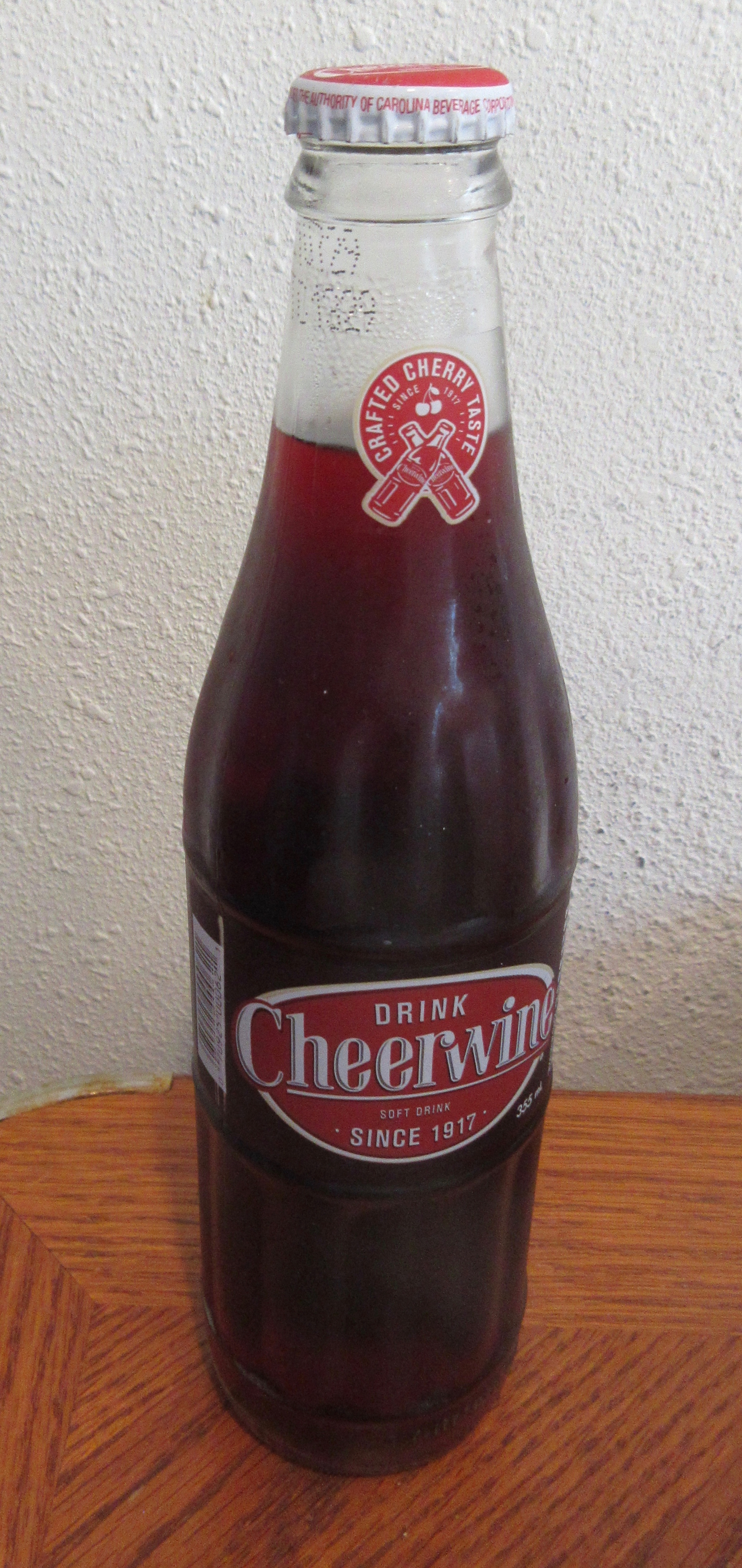
Cheerwine bottle

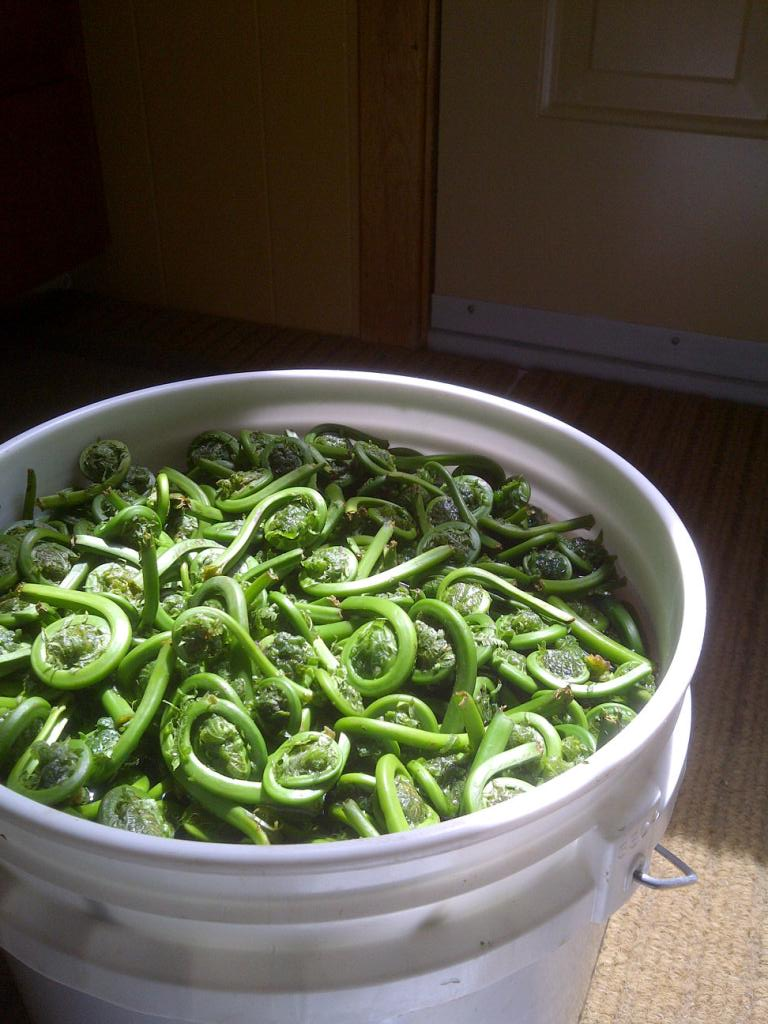
Fresh fiddlehead greens

British immigrants to Appalachia brought buttermilk, biscuits, dumplings, and moonshine. Chefs from the region have noted other European-originated foods like Italian sausage, and borscht. The Cherokee in Appalachia have contributed to the cuisine with dishes and ingredients such as boiled chestnut bread, fried creasy greens, ramps, pokeweed, corn, and fiddlehead greens. Poet Frank X Walker coined the term "Affrilachian" to signify the importance of the African-American presence in Appalachia, including in the cuisine. The African-Americans in Appalachia have contributed to the regional food history with ingredients such as kale, collard greens, peanut beans, foods infused with bourbon (baked goods, and vegetables), spoonbread, and the use of molasses and sorghum as a meat glaze.

Staples of Appalachian cuisine that are common in other regional cuisines of the south and in soul food include peanut brittle, sweet potato pie, pork chops, biscuits and gravy, fried chicken, chicken and dumplings, collard greens, cracklings, and ham hocks. Appalachia has a wide variety of wild game, with venison, rabbit, raccoon, and squirrel particularly common, thus helping to compensate for distance from major cities and transportation networks (this was particularly true in the 19th century). Many aspects of the diet came from economic necessity. Subsistence farming was the backbone of the Appalachian economy throughout much of the 19th century, and is still a practice in the present-day in some areas through farming revitalization efforts.

Traditionally most Appalachia homes used a fireplace and a dutch oven for cooking, which cooks hotter than a wood-burning stove. However some households preferred using a wood-burning stove. Sunday dinners are a tradition for many in the region.

== List of foods ==
=== Breads ===
- ash cake
- biscuits
- boiled chestnut bread
- buckwheat cakes
- corn bread
- corn pones
- cracklin' bread
- hoecake
- hush puppies
- molasses sweet bread
- pan-fried bread
- pepperoni roll
- light bread
- rye bread
- spoonbread
- syrup bread

=== Beans ===
- field beans
- greasy beans
- kidney beans
- soup beans
- shucky beans, or "leather britches"

=== Pickles ===
- chow-chow
- cucumber relish
- green tomato pickle
- iceberg green tomato pickle
- icebox green strawberry pickles
- pear relish
- icicle pickles
- pickled beans
- pickled corn
- pickled beets
- mustard pickle
- red tomato pickle
- sour kraut

=== Meat dishes ===
- chicken fried steak
- country ham
- cured meats
- deer jerky
- pan-fried liver
- gravy, including squirrel gravy
- roadkill cuisine
- Salmon patties
- slaw dog
- smoked pulled pork

=== Other dishes ===
- apple butter
- apple sauce
- Bibb salad
- buttermilk cucumber salad
- chestnuts
- creamed potato soup
- dumplings
- fried crease greens
- grits
- jams and jellies
- parched peanuts
- potato salad
- roasted candy roaster squash
- skillet corn
- sorghum syrup
- sour corn
- stews

=== Desserts ===
==== Pies and cobblers ====
- blackberry cobbler
- boysenberry pie
- chess pie
- dried apple pie
- dutch oven apple pie
- mincemeat pie
- rhubarb pie
- tame gooseberry pie
- sweet potato pie
- lemon cushaw pie
- sawdust pie
- transparent pie
- vinegar pie

==== Cakes ====
- apple stack cake
- carrot cake
- fruitcake
- pumpkin cake
- million-dollar pound cake

==== Candy ====
- Goo Goo Clusters
- Moon Pie
- molasses candy
- molasses taffy
- potato candy

==== Other desserts ====
- black walnut fudge
- egg custard
- carrot pudding
- gingerbread
- scalloped apples
- soft baked apples

== List of beverages ==
- corn liquor
- Ale8 soft drink
- Dr. Enuf soft drink
- Cheerwine soft drink
- Jack Daniel's whiskey
- moonshine
- Mountain Dew
- Ski soft drink
- sweet milk (whole milk)
- sweet tea

== List of common ingredients ==
=== Meats ===
- chicken
- beaver tail
- frog
- groundhog
- quail
- venison
- opossum
- rabbit
- raccoon
- sausage
- squirrel
- trout

=== Fruits ===
- apples, the Golden Delicious apples are the state fruit of West Virginia
- blackberries
- peaches
- pawpaw (asimina triloba)
- plums
- raspberries

=== Vegetables ===
- Appalachian truffle (Tuber canaliculatum)
- beans
- branch lettuce (micranthes micranthidifolia)
- canned garden vegetables
- creasy greens (barbarea verna)
- fiddlehead greens
- Jimmy Red corn, local heirloom variety used for moonshine
- lamb's quarters
- morel mushrooms
- peas
- pokeweed, various preparations including poke salad
- potatoes
- purselane
- ramps (allium tricoccum)
- squash, including Candy Roaster squash
- watercress

=== Other common ingredients ===
- eggs
- bay leaf oil
- buttermilk
- honey

== See also ==
- Appalachian music
- Appalachian studies
- Appalachian Studies Association
- Foxfire (magazine), a student-run magazine about Appalachian culture
