= Soup beans =

Southern United States bean dish

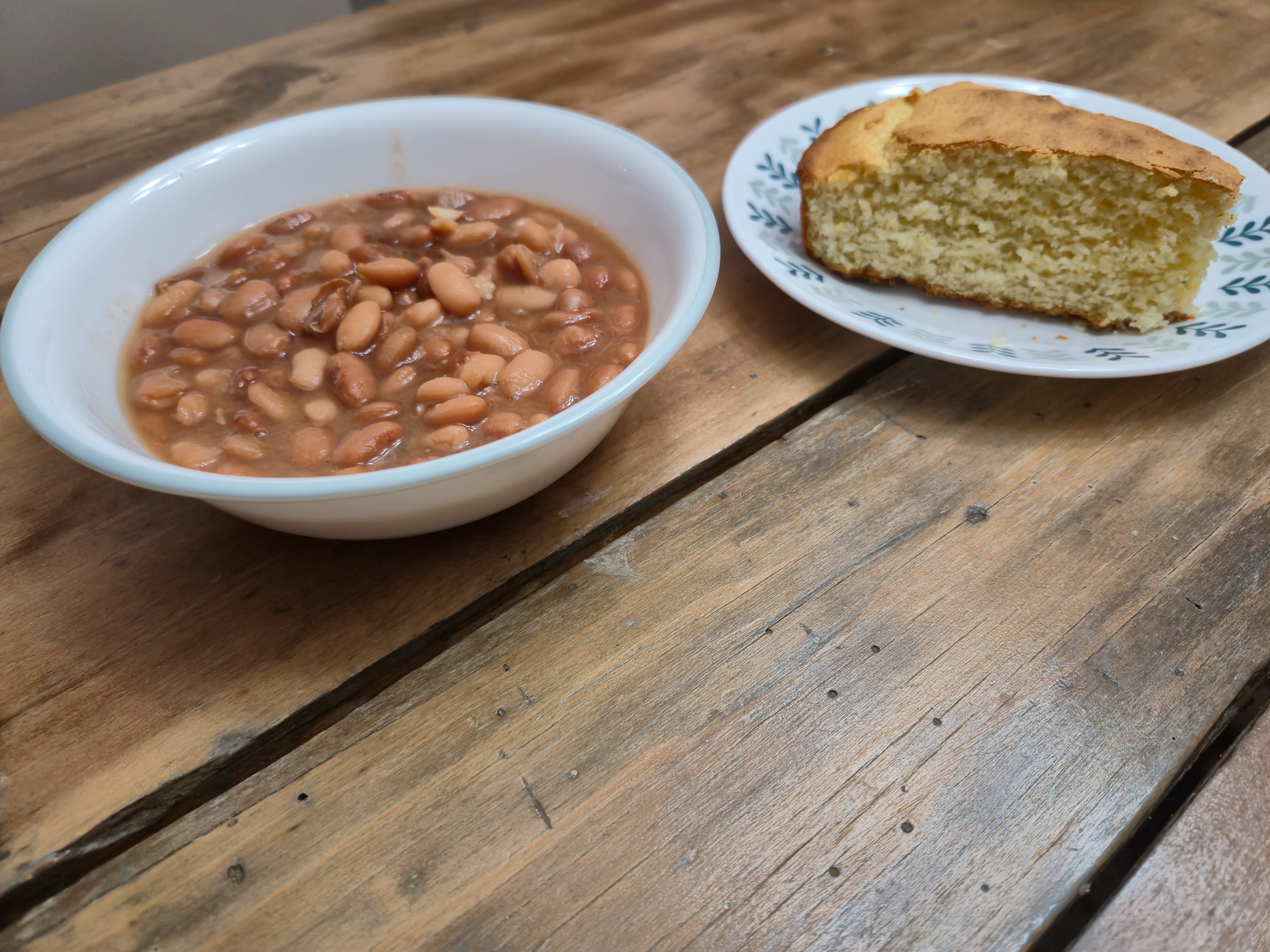
A bowl of Soup beans with cornbread

Soup beans is a dish of beans cooked with meat, common in the Southern United States, particularly the regions around the Appalachian Mountains. Soup beans are usually served with cornbread, greens (such as boiled cabbage, cauliflower, or sauerkraut and sausage), and potatoes (stewed or fried) and may be topped with raw chopped onions or ramps. Soup beans are considered a main course, but also serve as a side dish. In rural areas, where food was scarce during the winter, these dried beans were a staple food.

== Types of soup beans ==
While soup beans are traditionally pinto beans (called brown beans in the mountain region), other types of beans are also used.

- White beans — Great northern beans and Navy beans are often used to make a soup bean dish. This became more common as residents of rural areas began to rely more on store-bought beans and could afford more variety. This dish is typically referred to as "white beans" although it is occasionally called soup beans. Along with the beans, white beans are typically cooked in the juice of a country ham, often with the ham bone or ham included in the dish. As such, this dish is a prized part of holiday meals, when hams are baked. White beans are sometimes cooked with pork fat like brown soup beans, although this is less common. White beans carried an air of sophistication because they were first available in towns to people who could afford more than one type of bean and ham, as opposed to poorer rural people who often raised only brown beans.
- Butter beans — butter beans are used to make the soup bean dish called butter beans. These dried limas are cooked with smoked pork and/or ham until the sauce starts to thicken, hence the name "butter" beans. Like white beans, butter beans represented prosperity and were often prized dishes when served. Butter beans only refers to dried limas. Fresh or canned limas are called "lima beans".
- Black-eyed peas — While these peas are almost never referred to as "soup beans", the preparation in the Appalachian region is almost identical. Black-eyed peas, sometimes called blackeye peas, are most common where Appalachian culture intersects with lowland soul-food and coastal food cultures. Like Hoppin' John, black-eyed peas became common as a dish served on New Year's Day. However, since rice was not a part of mountain culture, the peas were cooked with pork (usually hog jowls) like soup beans and served with stewed tomatoes and collard greens. This dish becomes less common as one moves into more isolated mountain communities.

== Service ==
While soup beans might be served with any meal, they were typically the main course in a meatless supper. Traditionally, soup beans are served with other home grown vegetables and homemade breads:

- Cornbread — Prior to the availability of milled flour, thin, crispy fried yellow cornbread cakes called hoecakes or baked cornbread are sometimes served with a soup-bean supper. Often the beans are served atop a bed of crumbled cornbread, or cornbread may be crumbled into a bowl of beans, almost like adding crackers to chili.
- Potatoes — Irish white potatoes were typically served, especially during the winter months, boiled, mashed or fried (boiled then pan fried). In lowland areas, sweet potatoes are commonly served.
- Greens — Most commonly collard or turnip greens in the cold-weather months, prepared by slow cooking the greens with smoked pork or bacon grease. In the spring-time, kilt greens are available for preparation and service. Kil't greens are made by boiling tender garden lettuces and the nascent leaves of wild local plants, dressed with a hot bacon and onion vinaigrette, and served hot.
- Ramps or onions — Strong native onions called ramps were often served raw. They were often cut up onto the beans as seasonings other than salt and local herbs were not consistently available. Ramps are sometimes replaced by cultivated onions.
- Chow-chow - a relish-like condiment similar to British piccalilli, chow chow could be preserved and served with beans year-round.

Modern additions:

Modern supermarkets and processed foods have led to two additions to soup bean suppers which are not traditional.

- Salmon croquettes — The availability of canned salmon led to salmon croquettes or salmon patties being included with soup beans. The tastes are complementary and salmon, like any purchased meat, would be considered a luxury and not cooked in large quantities.
- Sauerkraut and sausage (also known as sauerkraut and weenies or mountain choucroute garnie) — Frankfurters and/or smoked sausage are sliced and pan-fried with sauerkraut for this common soup bean dinner dish.
- Macaroni and tomatoes — Macaroni and tomatoes is a common mountain-region side dish. Although there are many variations, the dish typically consists of cooked macaroni and canned tomatoes.
- Macaroni and cheese — In the latter part of the 20th century, supermarkets in mountain towns made processed cheese and pasta available, as well as boxed dinners. Macaroni and cheese was inexpensive and easy to add to a soup bean meal.

== See also ==
- Appalachian cuisine
- List of bean soups
- List of legume dishes
