= Sean Brock =

American chef (born 1978)

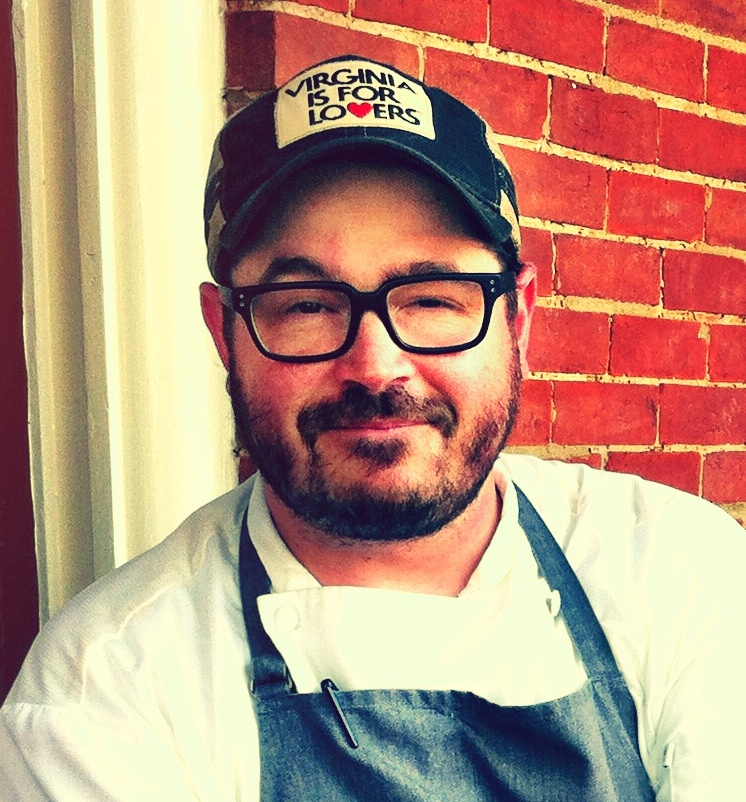
- Sean Brock in 2013
- Born: Homer Sean Brock; 1978 (age 47–48); Pound, Virginia, U.S.
- Education: Johnson & Wales University
- Spouses: Tonya Combs; Adi Noe (m. 2019)
- Children: 2
- Culinary career
- Cooking style: Southern cuisine, Appalachian cuisine
- Current restaurants: Sho Pizza Bar; darling
- Previous restaurants: Husk; McCrady's; McCrady's Tavern; Minero; Audrey; June; Bar Continental; Joyland
- Television shows: Iron Chef America; The Best Thing I Ever Ate; Unique Sweets; Anthony Bourdain: No Reservations; Anthony Bourdain: Parts Unknown; Top Chef; Ugly Delicious; The Mind of a Chef; Chef's Table
- Website: www.chefseanbrock.com

Sean Brock is an American chef specializing in Southern cuisine.

== Early life and education ==
Brock is originally from Pound in rural southwest Virginia. His father, who owned a trucking fleet that hauled coal, died when Brock was 11, resulting in the family becoming impoverished. He started working on the line at age 16. Brock graduated from culinary school at Johnson & Wales University in 2000.

== Restaurants ==
He was the executive chef at Charleston, South Carolina's Husk from its opening in 2010 until 2018, as well as a partner at McCrady's Restaurant. The menu at Husk uses authentically Southern ingredients and also previously used food grown in Brock's own garden. He is noted for preserving Southern foodways and heirloom ingredients, and collaborates with David Shields, the McClintock Professor of Southern Letters at University of South Carolina. He helped to promote Carolina Gold rice in recipes such as hoppin’ John. A second Husk location opened in Nashville in 2013.

In 2015 Brock opened Minero at Ponce City Market, Atlanta, Georgia. In November 2017, Brock opened the third Husk location in Greenville, South Carolina, in the city's West End district. In January 2018, Brock opened the fourth Husk location in Savannah, Georgia, in a restored building in the city’s landmark historic district.

He maintained the title of "founding chef and culinary advisor" at all four Husk locations until May 2019. In 2020, Brock opened Joyland, the first of his solo restaurant projects, featuring high-quality fast food inspired by his love of cheeseburgers and Southern fried chicken. He then opened a two-story, two-restaurant East Nashville, Tennessee eatery in October 2021 centered around Appalachian cuisine. The first restaurant, on the ground floor, is named "Audrey," for his grandmother, and the upstairs restaurant is named "June" after Audrey's middle name. Audrey is where Brock has furthered his life’s work of studying Appalachian foodways and hospitality. June is a modern dining concept offering a unique tasting menu format that curiously explores the possibilities of ingredients indigenous to the American South. In September 2023, Brock opened Bar Continental, a hi-fidelity vinyl bar and small plates restaurant.

In August 2025, Brock opened Darling, his first West Coast restaurant, in West Hollywood, California, pairing live-fire cooking with an adjoining hi-fi vinyl listening lounge. Darling serves Southern cuisine, drawing on Lowcountry and Appalachian cooking prepared with seasonal California produce, with dishes such as cornbread, grits, succotash, fried chicken, and country ham.

== Awards ==
In 2010, he won the James Beard Foundation Award for Best Chef Southeast. He has also been nominated for Outstanding Chef and Rising Star Chef.

Bon Appétit Magazine named Husk the “Best New Restaurant in America” in 2011.

Brock's first cookbook, Heritage, was released in October 2014 and is a New York Times bestseller. His Heritage cookbook also won the James Beard Foundation's award in the American Cooking category in April 2015. His second cookbook, South: Essential Recipes and New Explorations, was released in 2019 and featured in The New Yorker's best cookbooks of 2019.

== Television ==
Brock was one of the hosts of the second season of The Mind of a Chef. For his work on the show, Brock was nominated for a Daytime Emmy Award in the Outstanding Culinary Host category. He was also a featured chef in the sixth season of Netflix's Chef's Table.

== Personal life ==
He was previously married to high school sweetheart, Tonya Combs, marrying in 2006. In 2014 they divorced.

In 2016, after undergoing testing and various surgeries for three years, he was diagnosed with myasthenia gravis at Mayo Clinic. His friends became concerned about his drinking, and he spent his 39th birthday in rehab.

In February 2019, he and his girlfriend, Adi Noe, eloped. The couple have a son and a daughter.
