= Potato candy =

American confection

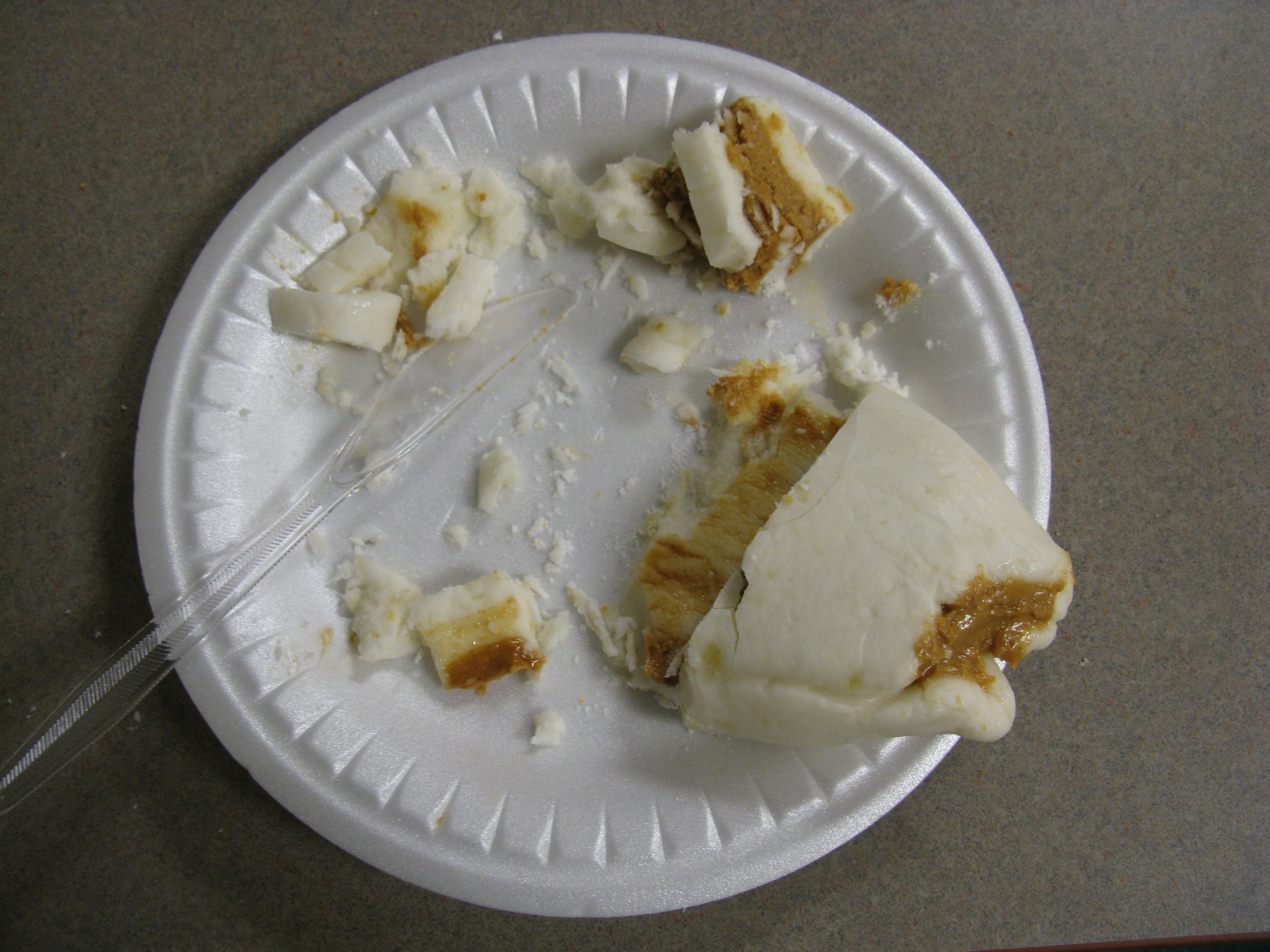
- A piece of potato candy, cut into to show the texture and interior peanut butter swirl.
- Alternative names: Potato candy pinwheel, peanut butter pinwheel, potato log, tater candy, Flitch
- Type: Candy
- Place of origin: United States
- Region or state: Appalachia
- Associated cuisine: Appalachian cuisine
- Main ingredients: Potato, powdered sugar
- Variations: Sweet potato candy

Potato candy, sometimes called a potato candy pinwheel, is a rolled candy prepared by mixing mashed potatoes with large amounts of powdered sugar to create a dough-like consistency, and then adding a filling, traditionally peanut butter, and rolling the mix to produce a log-like confection.

Potato candy does not require baking and is instead refrigerated in order to fully harden the candy, though it can stay at room temperature following the refrigeration process. Most sources indicate that the potato candy has a shelf life of roughly one to two weeks.

== Origin ==
Potato candy does not have a concrete origin, though it is cited as originating from European immigrants to the Appalachian region, and became a popular Depression-era recipe in the region due to the few and relatively cheap ingredients it utilizes.

Origins of the candy could possibly be traced to recipes brought to America by Russian, Irish, or German immigrants to the country during the late 18th and early 19th century, though no concrete proof of origin exists and the recipe only appears to be popular in the United States.

There are numerous variations to the original recipe, with some calling for the addition of vanilla extract to add some flavor, and some utilizing sweet potatoes instead of regular potatoes. Additionally, for the filling, though peanut butter is seen as the traditional filling, it may be substituted with other spreads such as Nutella.
