= Batter bread =

Bread with a high liquid-to-flour ratio

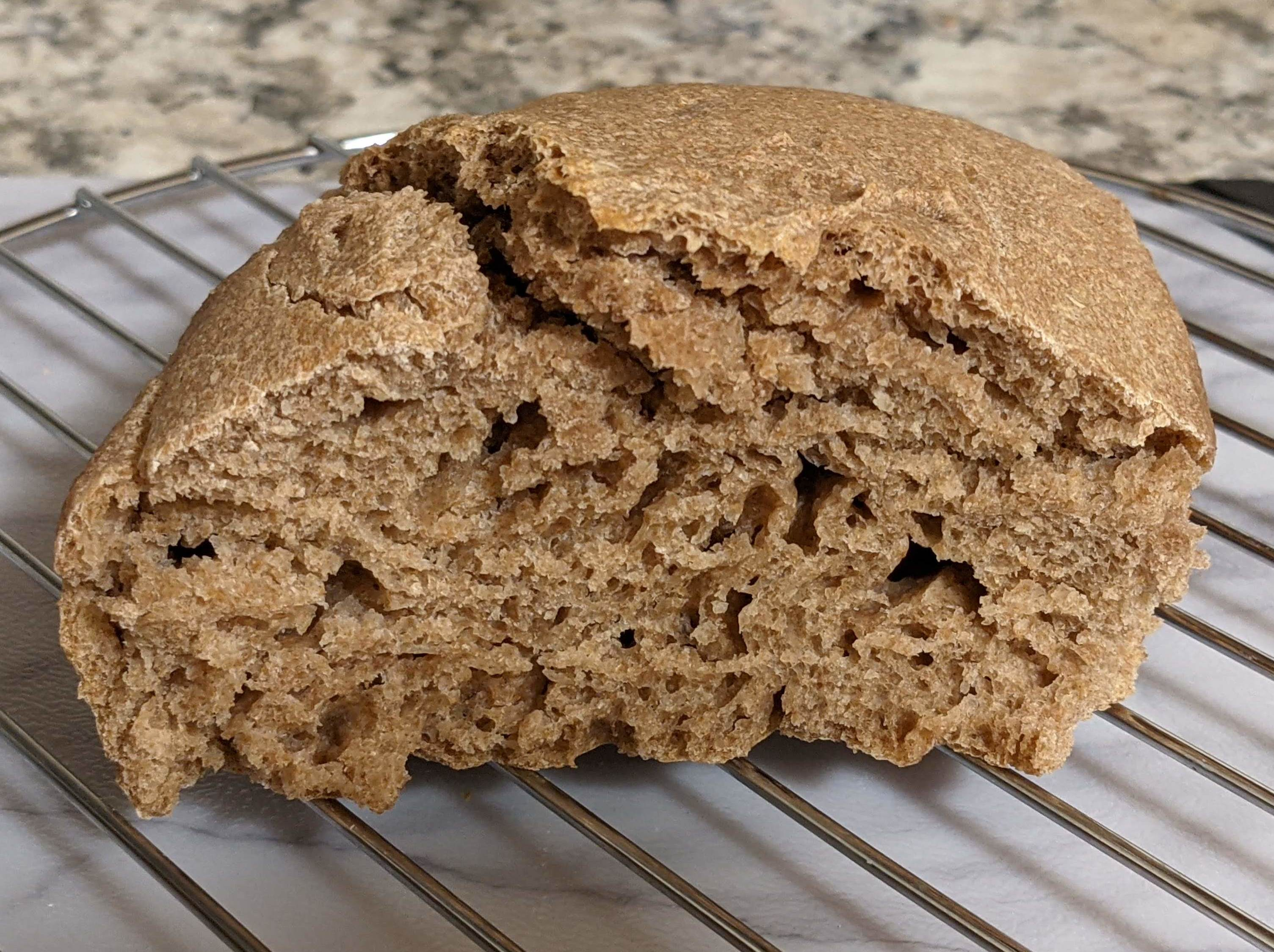
- Type: Bread
- Main ingredients: flour
- Food energy (per serving): 260 kcal (1,100 kJ)

Batter bread is bread made with a substantial liquid-to-flour ratio, so that the dough is a batter. It is known for its ease of preparation.

Batter bread is a staple food of the American South. Batter bread can be made with wheat flour, cornmeal, or corn flour, or both. A recipe for batter bread appears in The Virginia Housewife by Mary Randolph. Sally Lunn, Johnny cake, corn pone, and pancakes are well-known batter breads.
