= Shucky beans =

Appalachian bean dish

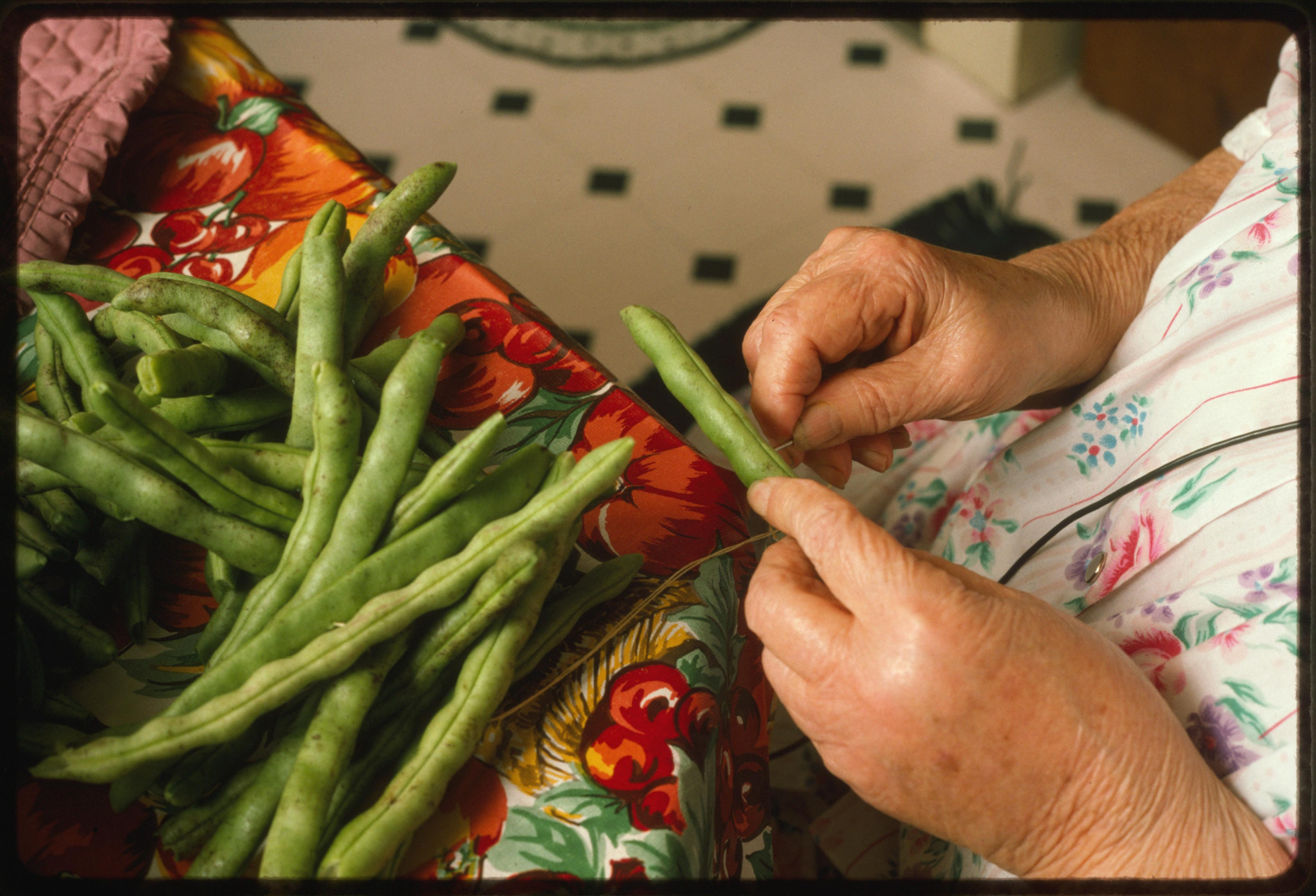
Stringing green beans for drying.

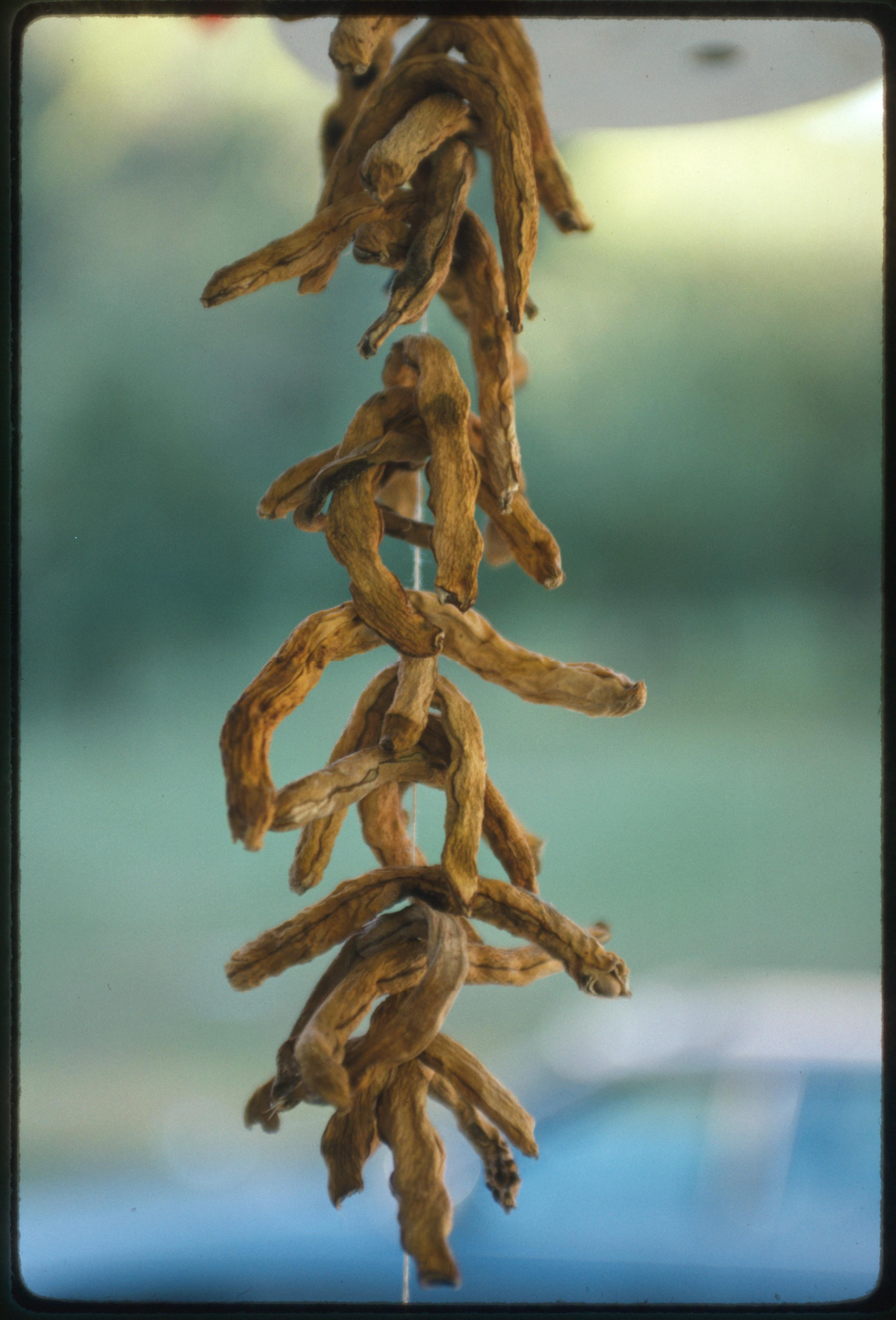
Green beans, strung up to dry on the porch.

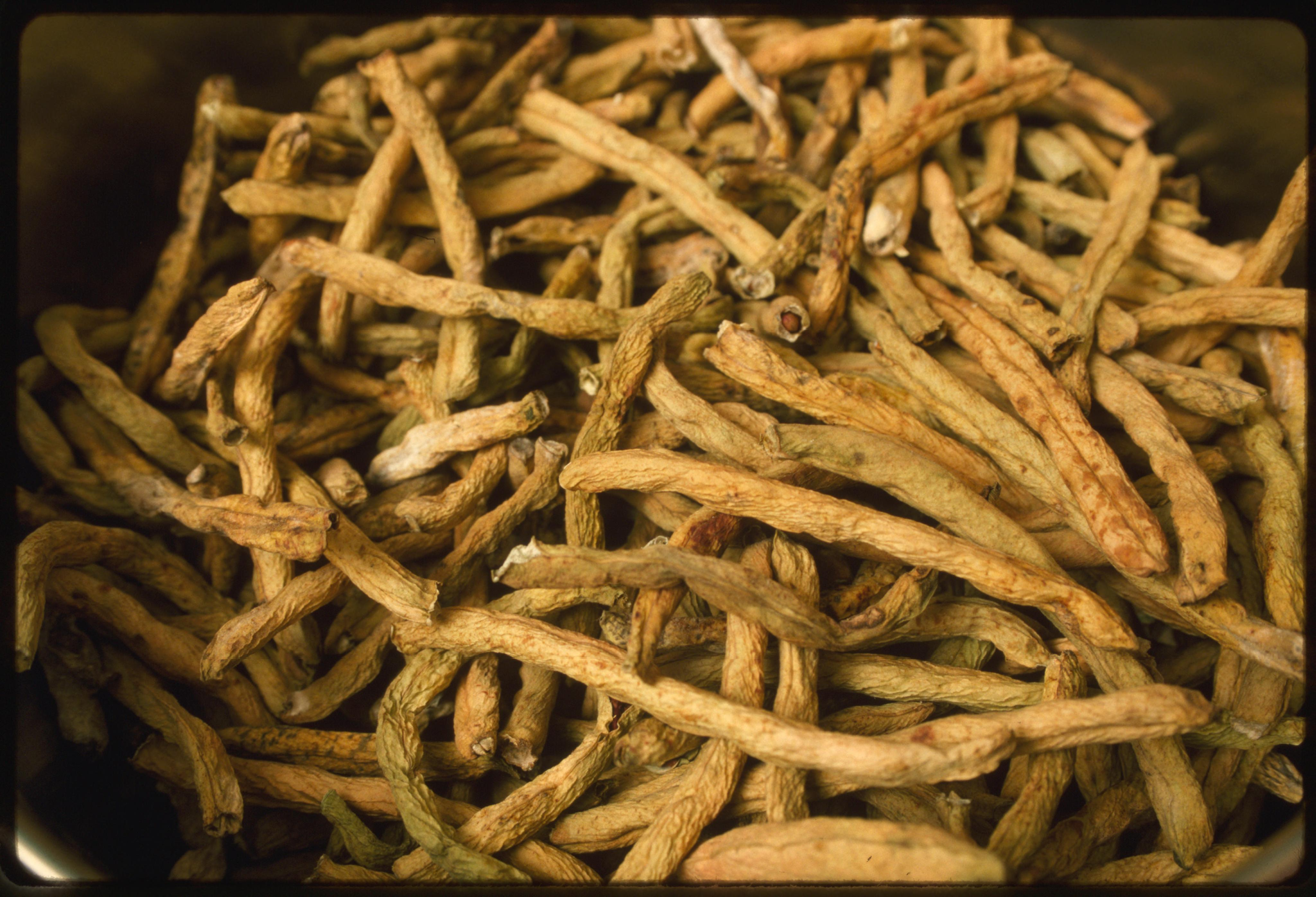
Dried green beans (known as leather britches or shucky beans)

Shucky beans (also called "leather britches") are an American legume dish, made of dried green beans that have been preserved for winter consumption. It is one of the most common side dishes of old-fashioned Appalachian cuisine. The traditional method to prepare the shucky beans is with a needle and thread. The beans are strung on the thread and hung, usually behind a wood stove, until they shrivel, giving the appearance of "leather britches". They can be dried other ways as well such as in a greenhouse, on a tin roof or in a hot car. They are stored in a pillowcase or flour sack in a dry area until needed. The dried beans can be simmered for a few hours with fatback to create a winter meal that can be served with cornbread and sliced onion.
