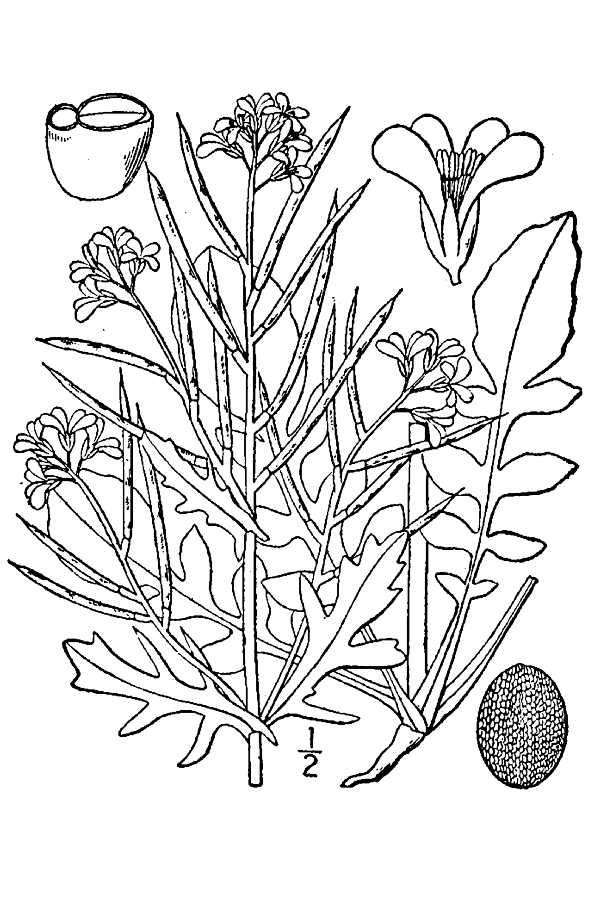

Conservation status
- Data Deficient (IUCN 3.1)

Scientific classification
- Kingdom: Plantae
- Clade: Tracheophytes
- Clade: Angiosperms
- Clade: Eudicots
- Clade: Rosids
- Order: Brassicales
- Family: Brassicaceae
- Genus: Barbarea
- Species: B. verna

Binomial name
- Barbarea verna (Mill.) Asch.

Synonyms
- Barbarea australis Jord.; Barbarea brevistyla Jord.; Barbarea erysimoides Schur; Barbarea longisiliqua Jord.; Barbarea patula Fr.; Barbarea praecox (Sm.) R.Br.; Campe praecox (Sm.) Dulac; Campe verna (Mill.) A.Heller; Crucifera praecox E.H.L.Krause; Erysimum praecox Sm.; Erysimum tenuifolium Stokes; Erysimum vernum Mill.

= Barbarea verna =

Land cress

Species of flowering plant

Barbarea verna is a biennial herb in the family Brassicaceae. Common names include land cress, American cress, bank cress, black wood cress, Belle Isle cress, Bermuda cress, poor man's cabbage, early yellowrocket, early wintercress, scurvy cress, creasy greens, and upland cress. It is native to southern Europe and western Asia, and naturalized elsewhere It has been cultivated as a leaf vegetable in England since the 17th century. As it requires less water than watercress, it is easier to cultivate.

== Description ==
Annual or biennial, winter green, herbaceous plant in the Brassicaceae. The seeds typically germinate in the autumn to form an over-wintering rosette. The following spring, it grows a main stem up to about 90 cm, sometimes up to 130 cm, which is pale green, grooved (sulcate) and occasionally branched. The leaves are alternate and pinnate with clasping auricles at the base and between 4 and 11 pairs of sub-opposite lobes. The upper leaves have much narrower lobes than those found lower down. The whole plant is almost entirely glabrous.

The flowers appear in early spring. The inflorescence is a terminal raceme, or lateral raceme arising from the leaf axils, with 6 to 25 flowers on short 3-8mm pedicels. There are four yellowy green sepals, 5mm long and four bright yellow petals each 8mm long. Six stamens and one style with a capitate stigma at the tip.

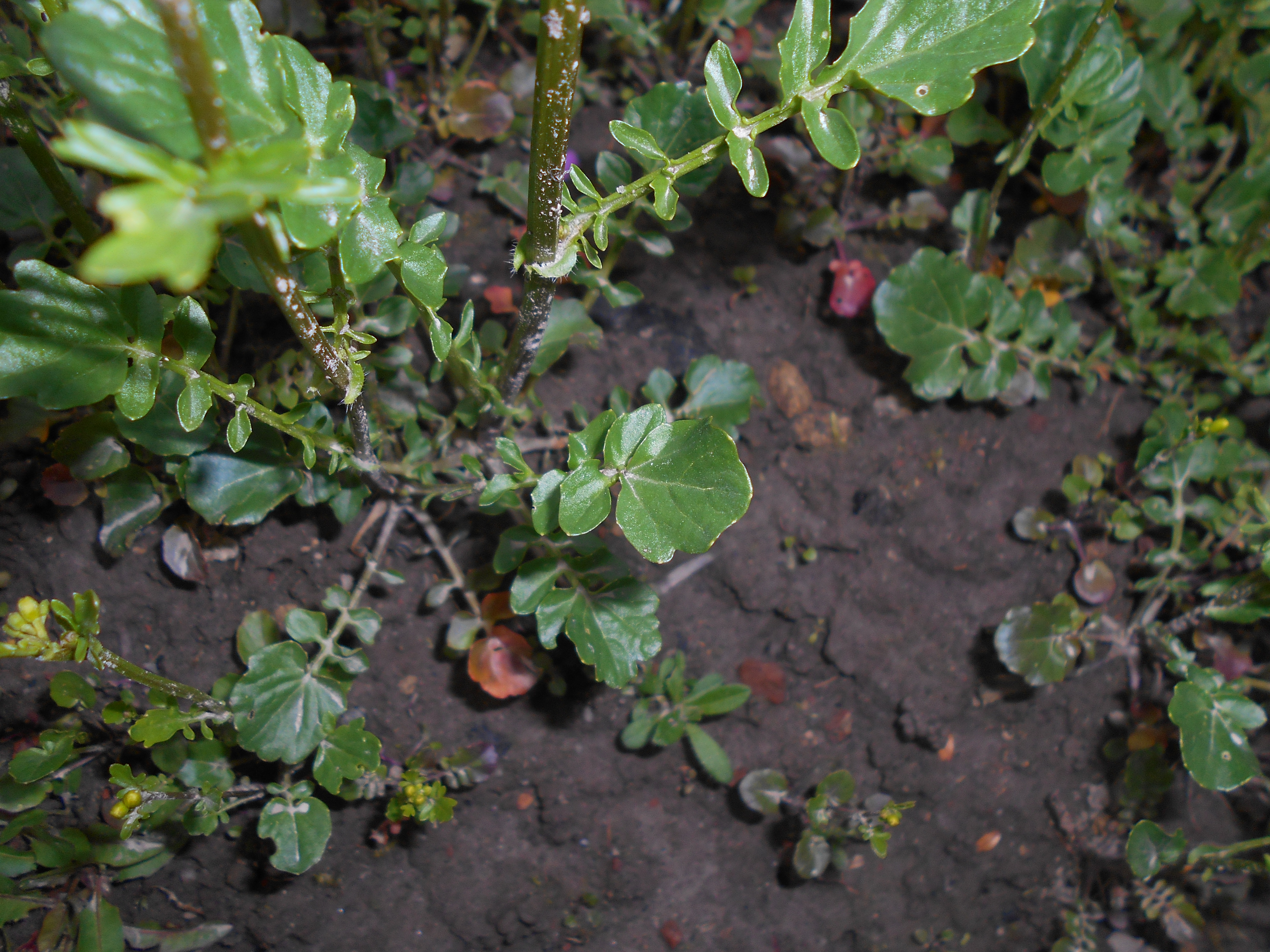

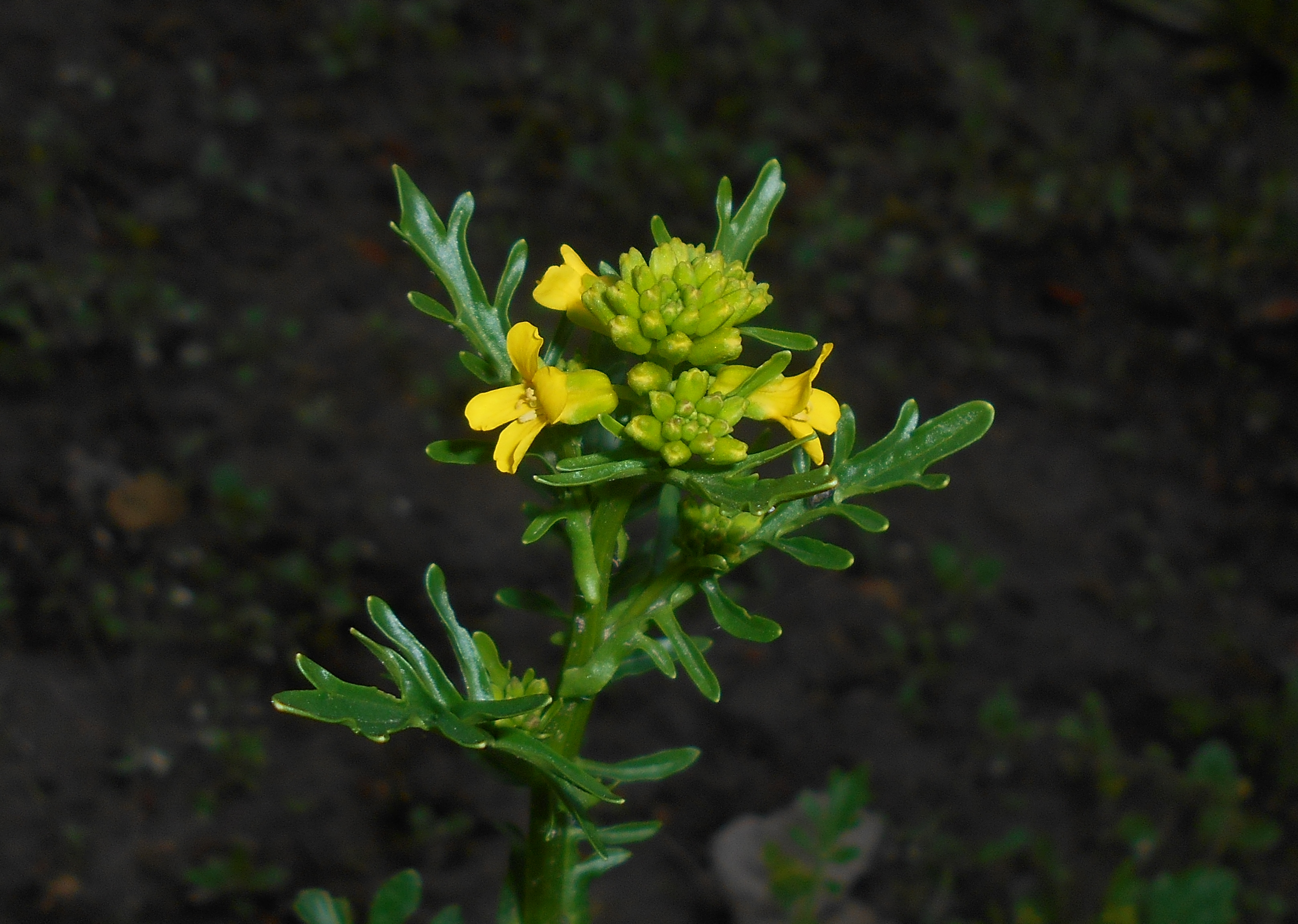

== Uses ==
Land cress is considered a satisfactory substitute for watercress. It can be used in sandwiches, or salads, or cooked like spinach, or used in soups or pestos.

Land cress can be grown easily in any garden. Like watercress, it loves water, but does not do well when partially submerged for long periods of time. This plant needs full sun or partial shade and moist or poorly drained soil. It is a common green in Appalachian cuisine as one of few plants that can overwinter in the mountains.

Other common names include dryland cress, cassabully, and American watercress. When cooked similarly to Southern collard greens the leaves may be called creasy greens. A variegated form is available.

== See also ==
- Barbarea vulgaris
