= Johnnycake =

American cornmeal flatbread

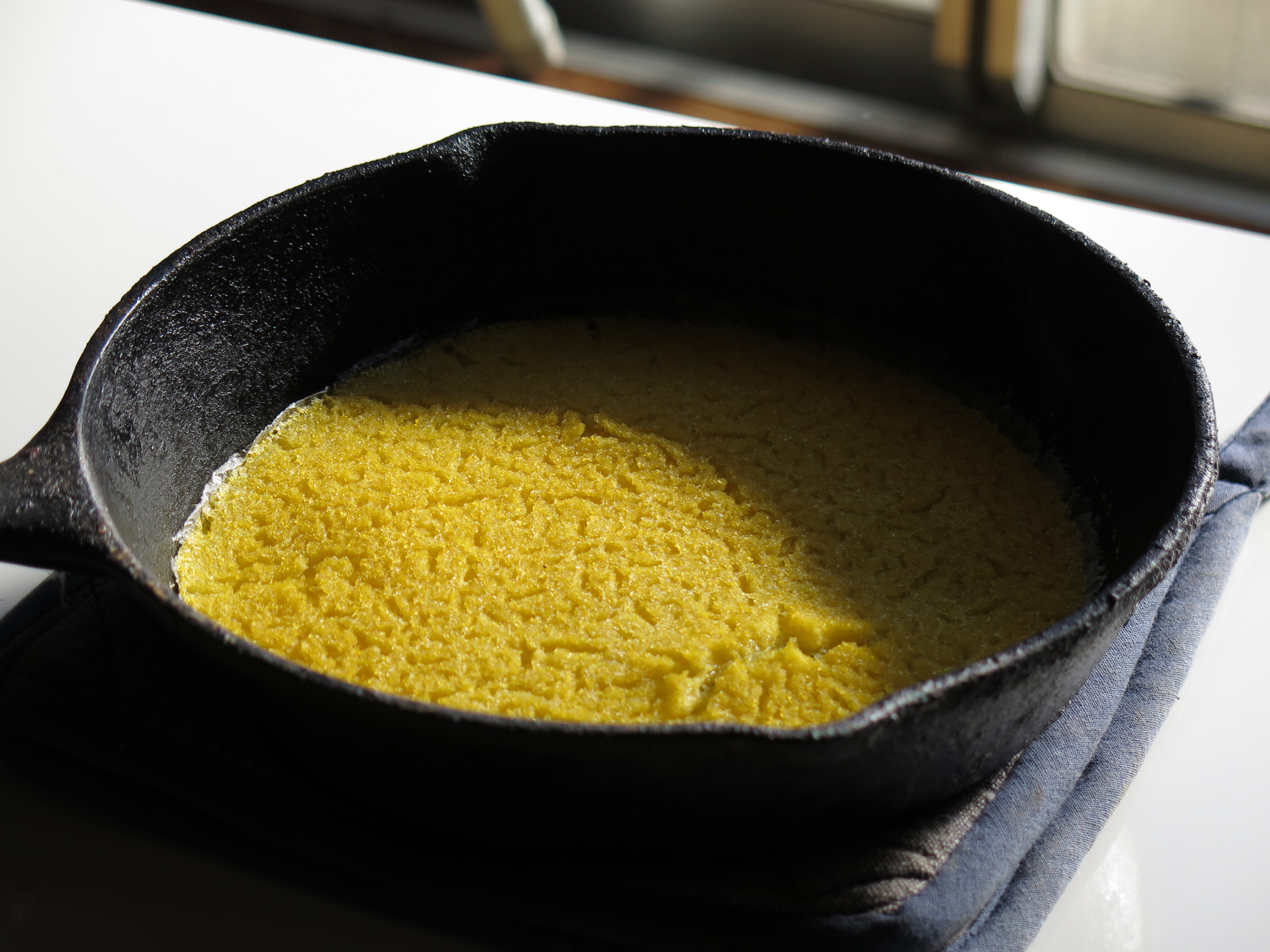
- A johnnycake in a cast iron fry pan
- Alternative names: Jonnycake, journey cake, hoecake, shawnee cake, spider cornbread
- Main ingredients: Cornmeal

Johnnycake, also known as journey cake, hoecake, shawnee cake, or spider cornbread, is a cornmeal flatbread, a type of batter bread. An early North American staple food, it is prepared on the Atlantic coast from Newfoundland to Jamaica. The food originates from the indigenous people of North America. It is still eaten in the Bahamas, Belize, Nicaragua, Bermuda, Canada, Colombia, Aruba, Curaçao, Bonaire, Dominican Republic, Puerto Rico, Saint Croix, Sint Maarten, Turks & Caicos Islands, Antigua, and the United States.

The modern johnnycake is found in the cuisine of New England and is often claimed as originating in Rhode Island.

== Etymology ==
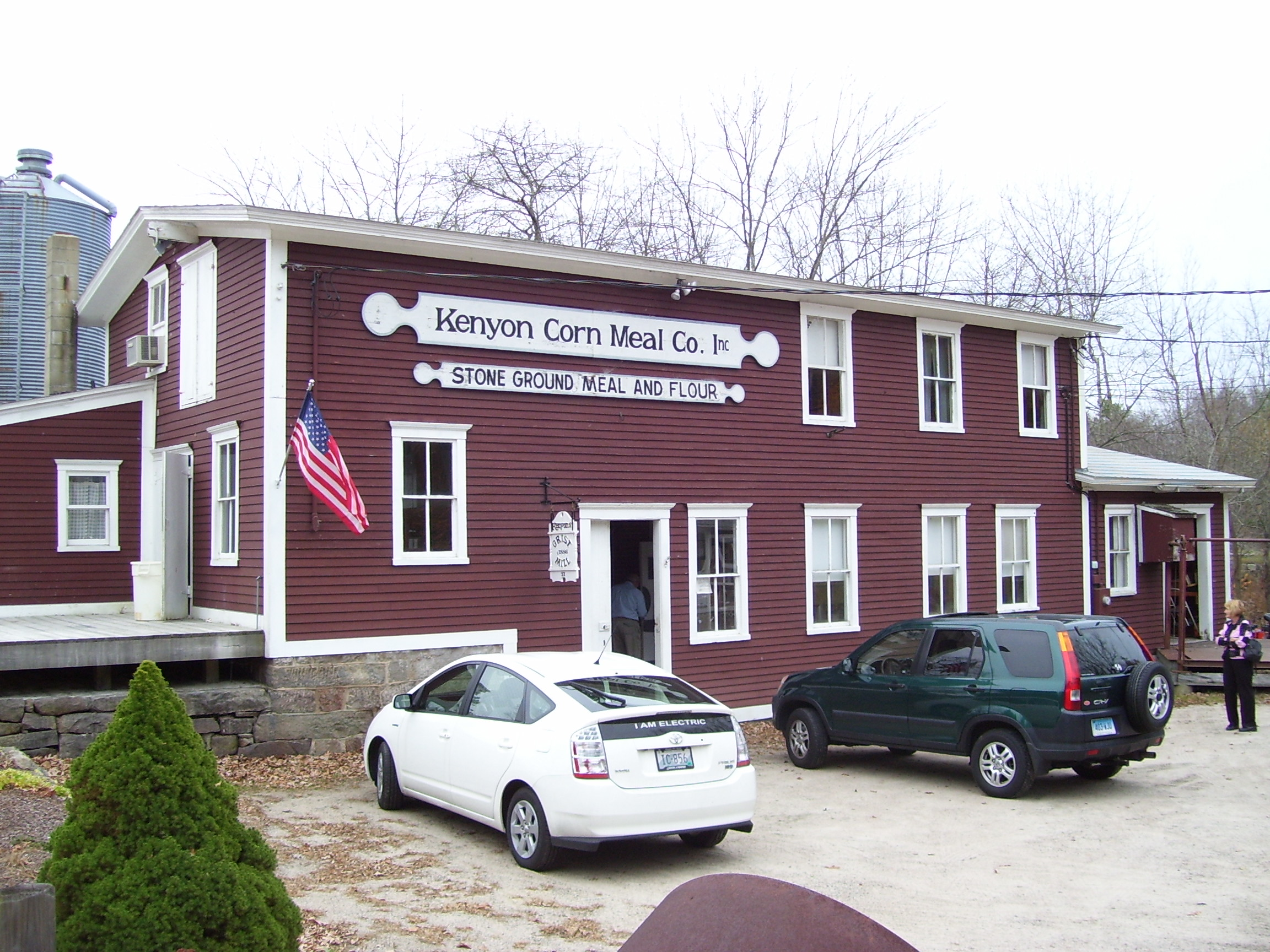
Kenyon Corn Meal Company, a gristmill in Usquepaug, Rhode Island. The building shown was built in 1886, and company history dates from the early 1700s or earlier.

=== Johnnycake ===
The earliest attestation of the term "johnny cake" is from 1739; the spelling "journey cake" is attested only from 1775 on the Gulf Coast, but may be the earlier form.

The word is likely based on the word Jonakin, recorded in New England in 1765, itself derived from the word jannock, recorded in Northern England in the sixteenth century. According to Edward Ellis Morris, the term was the name given "... by the Americans to a cake made of Indian corn (maize)."

Another suggested derivation is that it comes from Shawnee cake, although some writers disagree.

=== Hoecake ===
The term hoecake is first attested in 1745, and the term is used by American writers such as Joel Barlow and Washington Irving. The origin of the name is the method of preparation: they were cooked on a type of iron pan called a hoe. There is conflicting evidence regarding the common belief that they were cooked on the blades of gardening hoes.

A hoecake can be made either out of cornbread batter or leftover biscuit dough. A cornbread hoecake is thicker than a cornbread pancake.

== Origin ==
Indigenous peoples of the Americas using ground corn for cooking are credited with teaching Europeans how to make this food. It is also claimed that johnnycakes were made by the Narragansett people as far back as the 1600s.

From this culture came one of the main staples of the Southern diet: corn (maize). Corn was used to make all kinds of dishes from the familiar cornbread and grits to liquors such as whiskey and moonshine, which were important trade items. Cornbread was popular during the American Civil War because it was very cheap and could be made in many different sizes and forms. It could be fashioned into high-rising, fluffy loaves or simply fried for a fast meal.

To a far greater degree than anyone realizes, several of the most important food dishes that the Southeastern Indians live on today is the "soul food" eaten by both black and white Southerners. Hominy, for example, is still eaten ... Sofkee live on as grits ... cornbread [is] used by Southern cooks ... Indian fritters ... variously known as "hoe cake", ... or "Johnny cake."... Indian boiled cornbread is present in Southern cuisine as "corn meal dumplings", ... and as "hush puppies", ... Southerners cook their beans and field peas by boiling them, as did the Indians ... like the Indians they cure their meat and smoke it over hickory coals.

== Preparation ==
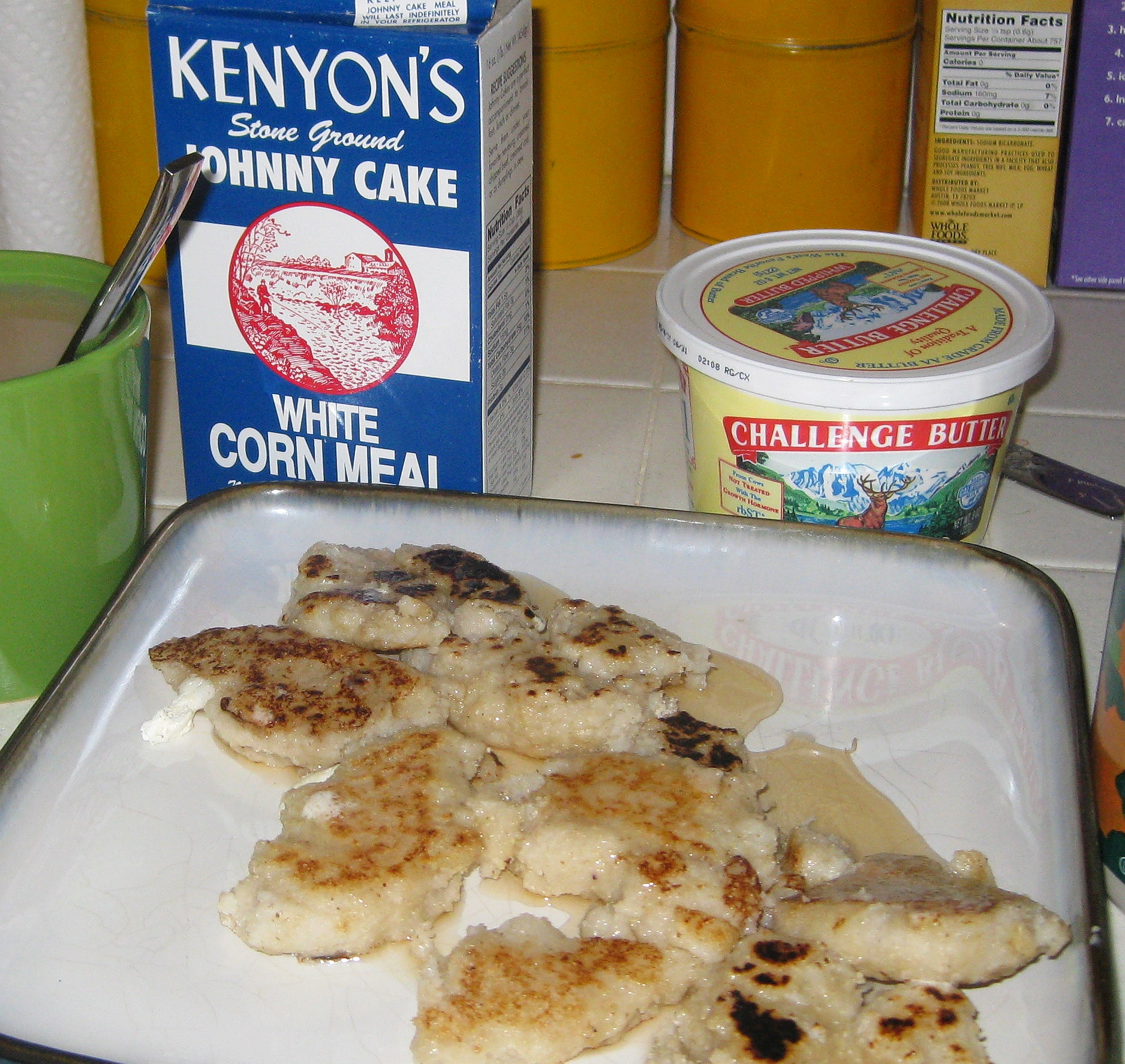
Johnnycakes on a plate

Johnnycakes are an unleavened cornbread made of cornmeal, salt, and water. Early cooks set thick corn dough on a wooden board or barrel stave, which they leaned on a piece of wood or a rock in front of an open fire to bake.

In the American south during the 18th century versions were made with rice or hominy flour and perhaps cassava. A 1905 cookbook includes a recipe for "Alabama Johnny Cake" made with rice and 'meal'.

The difference between johnnycake and hoecake originally lay in the method of preparation, though today both are often cooked on a griddle or in a skillet. Some recipes call for baking johnnycakes in an oven, similar to corn pones, which are still baked in the oven as they were traditionally.

Johnnycakes may also be made using leavening, with or without other ingredients more commonly associated with American pancakes, such as eggs or solid fats like butter. Like pancakes, they are often served with maple syrup, honey, or other sweet toppings.

According to the manuscript of America Eats, a Works Progress Administration (WPA) guide to American food culture in the beginning decades of the twentieth century, Rhode Island "jonny cakes" were made in the 1930s as follows:

In preparation, [white corn] meal may or may not be scalded with hot water or hot milk in accordance with preference. After mixing the meal with water or milk, it is dropped on a smoking hot spider [pan with legs] set atop a stove into cakes about 3"x3"x1/2" (Note: 3 by 3 by 1/2 inch (7.6 by 7.6 by 1.3 cm)) in size. The secret of cooking Johnny cakes is to watch them closely and keep them supplied with enough sausage or bacon fat so they will become crisp and not burn. Cook slowly for half an hour, turn occasionally, and when done, serve with plenty of butter.

== Variations ==
=== Australia ===
In Australia the bread usually known as damper, made with wheat flour rather than cornmeal and cooked as smaller, individually-sized portions, is sometimes called "johnny cake". It is uncertain if this name was influenced by the term for North American cornmeal bread. Australian johnny cakes are baked in the hot ashes of a fire or fried in fat in a frying pan (skillet).

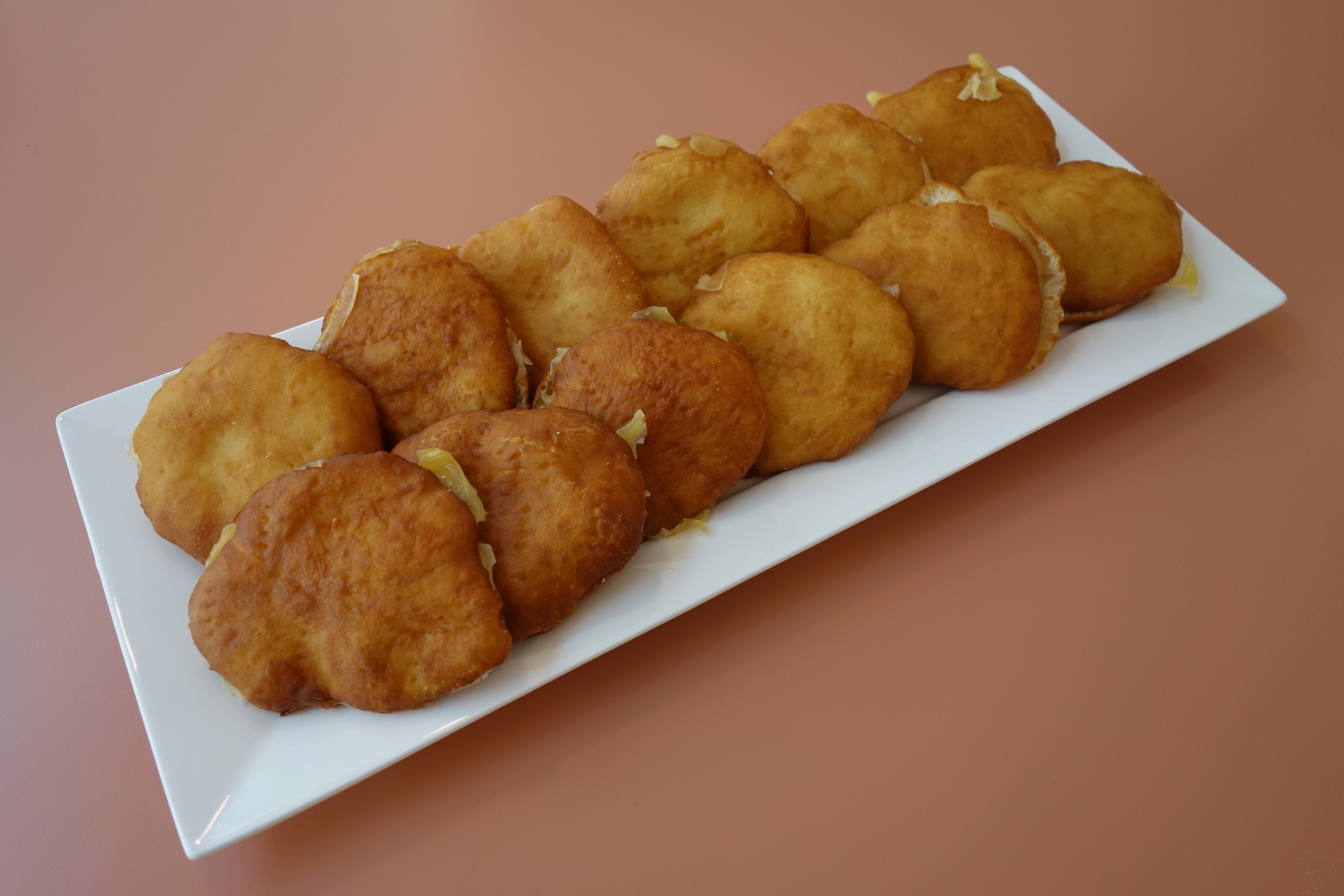
Deep-fried johnnycakes filled with cheese, common in the Caribbean Netherlands

=== The Bahamas ===
In the Bahamas, "Johnny cake" refers to a bread made with flour, sugar, butter, and water. After being kneaded, the bread is baked until lightly browned, and has a soft and malleable middle. This bread is usually eaten with soup or on its own. The common bread consumed in the Bahamas in 1725 was made of corn and flour. According to Mark Catesby, an English naturalist who visited North America and the Caribbean in the early 1700s, "Their bread is made of Maiz, or Indian Corn, and also of Wheat; the first they cultivate, but not sufficient for their consumption. Wheat is imported to them in Flour from the Northern Colonies."

The lyrics of the West Indian children's song "Brown Girl in the Ring" include the lines "I remember one Saturday night / we had fried fish and johnnycakes".

=== Dominican Republic ===
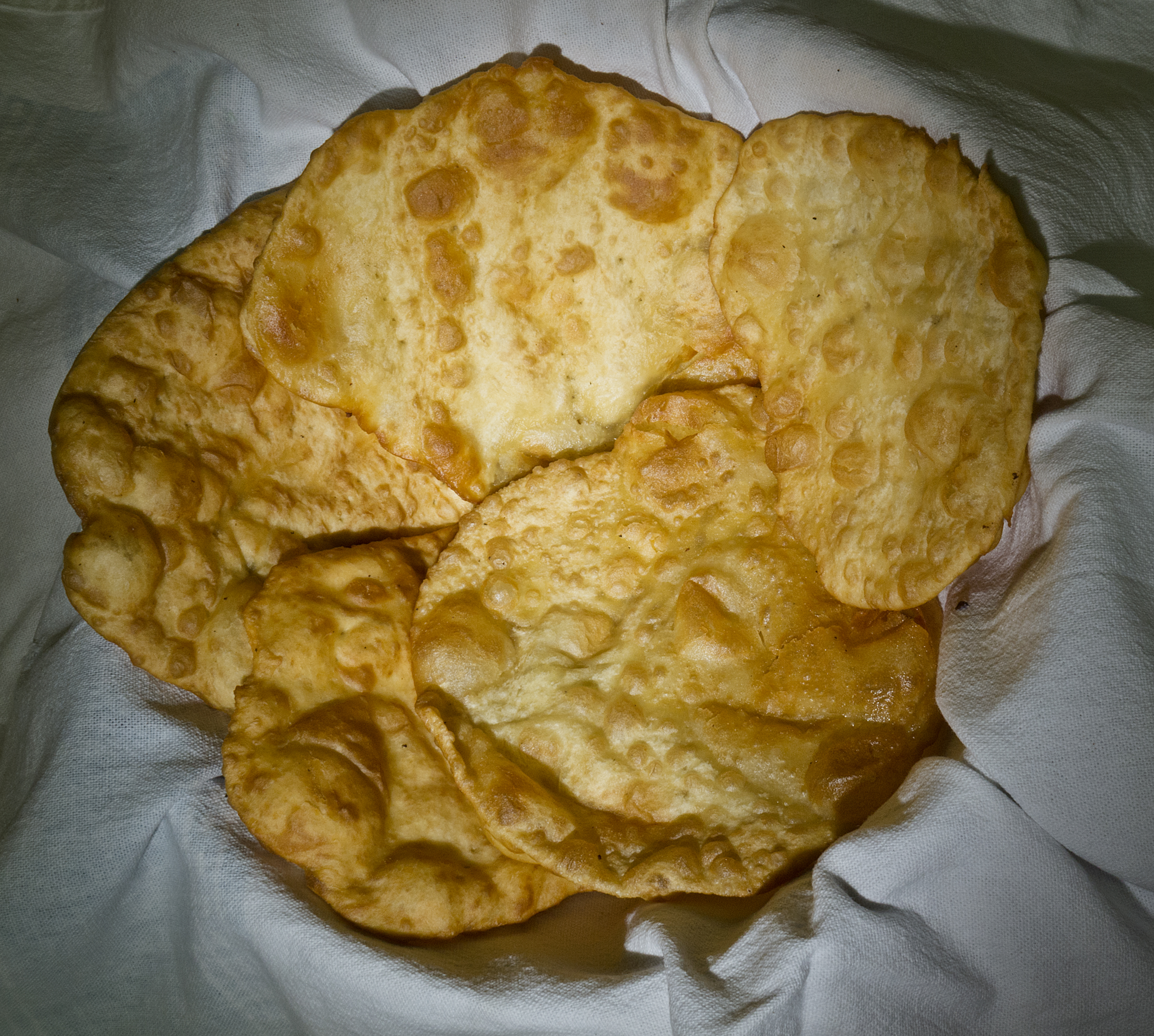
Dominican style Yaniqueques

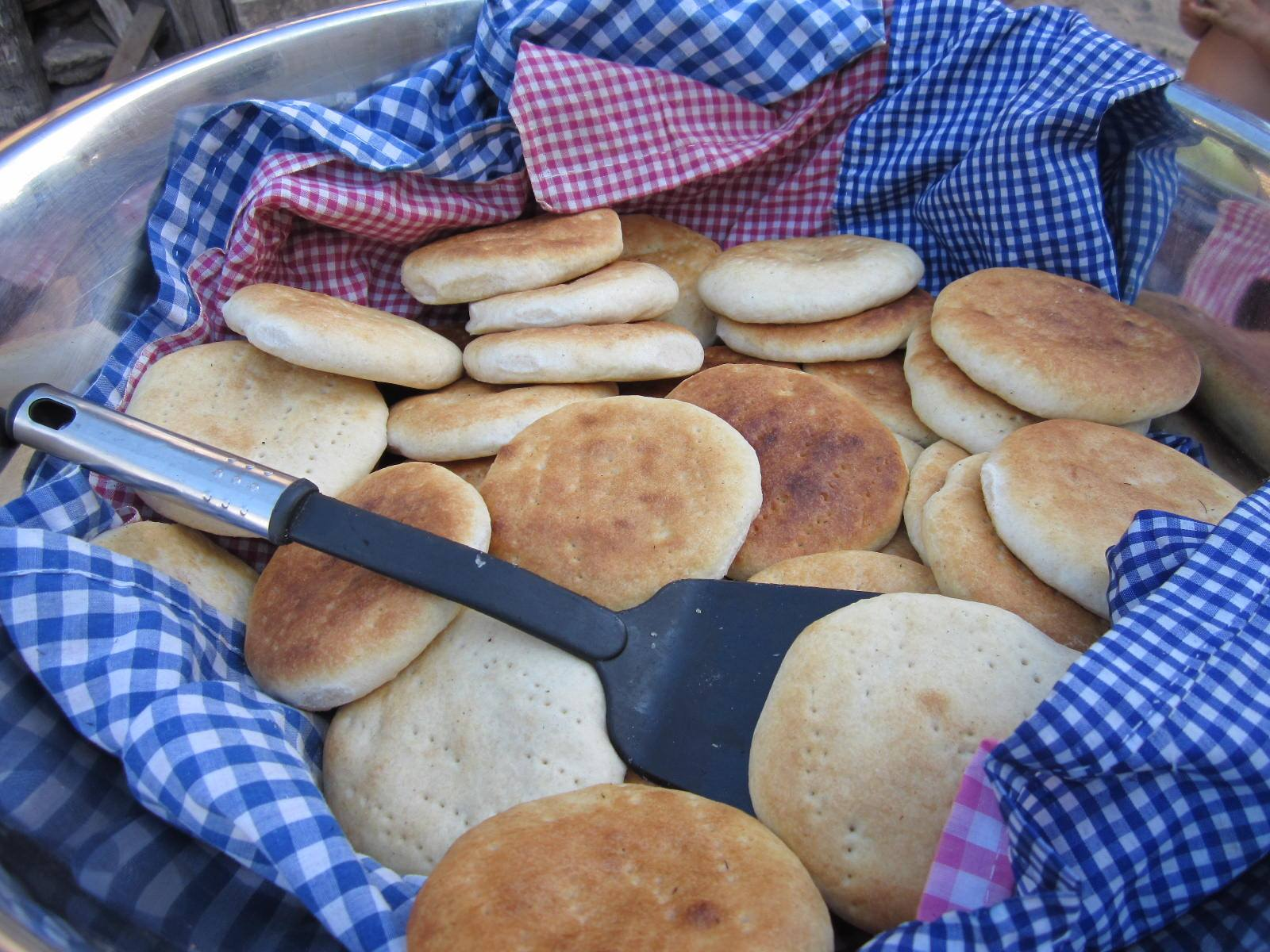
Belizean johnny cakes

Yaniqueques or yanikeke are a Dominican Republic version of the johnnycake, supposedly brought over in the nineteenth century by English-speaking migrants (possibly of Afro-Caribbean descent). They are a popular beach snack, especially in Boca Chica.

=== United States ===
The modern johnnycake is a staple in the traditional cuisine of New England, where it is believed to have originated in Rhode Island. A modern johnnycake is fried gruel made from yellow or white cornmeal that is mixed with salt and hot water or milk, and sometimes sweetened. In the Southern United States, the same food is referred to as a hoecake.

== In popular culture ==
The eighth episode of season six of the HBO crime drama The Sopranos is named "Johnny Cakes", after the modern dish found mainly in New England.

Johnnycakes are mentioned in Little House in the Big Woods, the first book in the Little House on the Prairie series by Laura Ingalls Wilder.

== See also ==
- American cuisine – Food culture of the United States
- Arepa – South American corn flatbread
- Bannock (Indigenous American food) – Type of bread
- Cornbread – American bread made with cornmeal
- Corn cookie – Baked good made from corn, often sweet
- Corn fritters – Fried cakes of maize dough
- Frybread – Variety of flatbread
- Hushpuppy – Deep-fried savory food made from cornmeal batter
- Johnnycake Town – Settlement settled in the 18th century
- List of maize dishes
- Spoonbread – Cornmeal pudding from the Southern United States
