= Cornbread =

American bread made with cornmeal

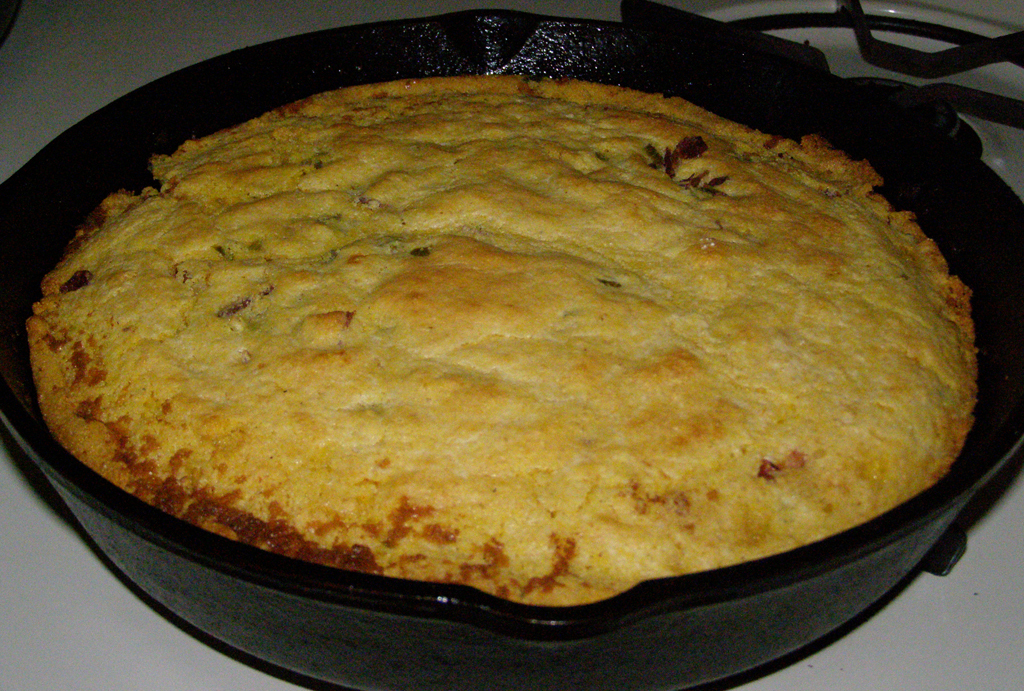
- Skillet cornbread
- Type: Quick bread
- Created by: Native Americans
- Main ingredients: Cornmeal, baking powder
- Variations: Baked cornbread, cracklin' bread, corn pone, hot water cornbread, johnnycakes, hushpuppies

Cornbread is a quick bread made with cornmeal, popular in the cuisine of the Southern United States, with origins in Native American cuisine. It is an example of batter bread. Dumplings and pancakes made with finely ground cornmeal are staple foods of the Hopi people in Arizona. The Hidatsa people of the Upper Midwest call baked cornbread naktsi, while the Choctaw people of the Southeast call it bvnaha. The Cherokee and Seneca tribes enrich the basic batter, adding chestnuts, sunflower seeds, apples, or berries, and sometimes combine it with beans or potatoes. Modern versions of cornbread are usually leavened by baking powder.

== History ==
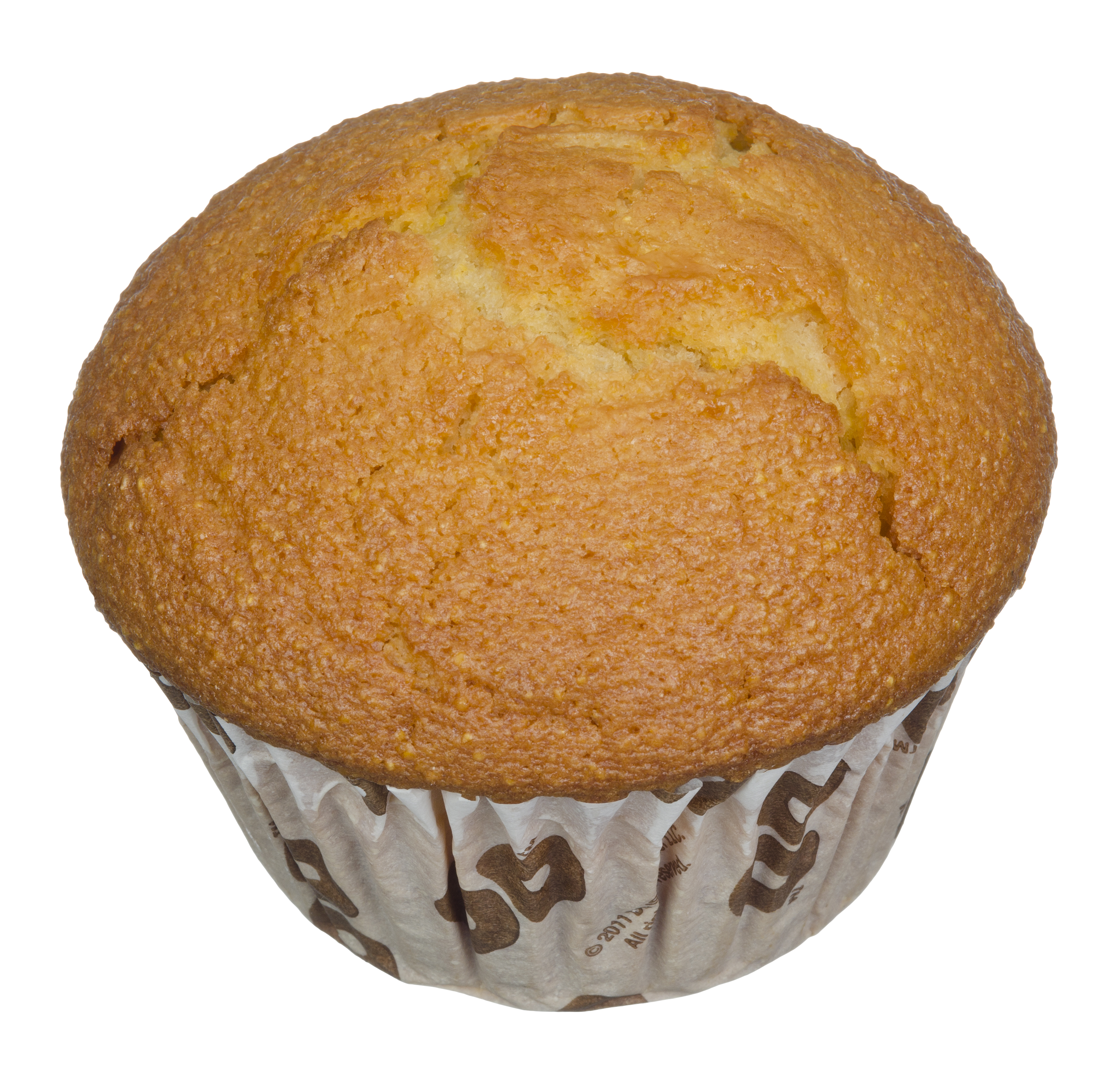
Cornbread, prepared as a muffin

Native people in the Americas began using corn (maize) and ground corn as food thousands of years before Europeans arrived in the New World. First domesticated in Mexico around six thousand years ago, corn was introduced to what is now the United States between three thousand and one thousand years ago. Native cooks developed a number of recipes based on corn, including cornbread, that were later adopted by European settlers and slaves —especially those who lived in Southern colonies.

Although Native people in the Americas first cultivated corn, it was introduced in West Africa by European traders shortly after contact through the Atlantic slave trade, and quickly became a major staple in African cooking. Cornbread dishes like kush, for example, in Senegambia and the Sahel represent the transference of cuisine and culture that occurred across the Atlantic Ocean. Cornbread has become a cuisine cornerstone within the southeastern United States as well as being featured on the plates of African Americans, European Americans, and Native people alike.

In its earliest developments in the American colonies, cornbread was a simple combination of ground cornmeal and water that was then stirred together and baked over an open fire or in a hearth. At this point in its history, cornbread's role in Southern cuisine emerged from necessity. Although farmers in the Northeast and Midwest could grow wheat and rye, the heat and humidity of the South made European wheat wither and turn rancid.

== Debate ==
In the 18th century, the addition of other ingredients, such as buttermilk, eggs, baking soda, baking powder, and pork products (rendered bacon and ham hog fat), greatly changed the texture and flavor of earlier iterations of cornbread, making it much more similar to the version that is eaten today. Although those ingredients were introduced in the 19th century to improve the texture and taste of cornbread, there are two other common ingredients that were excluded from most recipes until the 20th century: sugar and wheat flour. As traditional stone mills were replaced with more-efficient steel roller mills in the 20th century, the quality of cornmeal was degraded. The heat from the steel rollers detracted from the corn kernel's natural sweetness and flavor and reduced the particle size of the cornmeal produced. As a result, newer cornbread recipes adapted, adding sugar and wheat flour to compensate for the reduced sweetness and structural integrity of the cornmeal. In addition, the introduction of steel roller mills ushered in a new look to cornmeal; the new cornmeal tended to be yellow, whereas the old-fashioned stone-ground cornmeal in the coastal South had been traditionally white. Following the proliferation of the more finely-ground yellow cornmeal, debates arose surrounding sweet vs. savory cornbread and white vs. yellow cornmeal—debates which still occur among cornbread eaters and cookers today. The importance of these differences for some cooks and eaters cannot be overstated; in 1950, for example, Francine J. Parr of Houma, Louisiana, posted a desperate headline in the Times-Picayune, "Who's Got Coarse Grits?," further explaining, "The only grits we can get is very fine and no better than mush. In short, I'm advertising for some grocer or other individual selling coarse grits to drop me a line." Like Parr, some Southerners still prefer the traditional white cornmeal.

== Types of cornbread ==
Cornbread can be baked, fried or steamed. Steamed cornbread is mushy, chewier, and more like cornmeal pudding than what most consider to be traditional cornbread. Cornbread can also be baked into corn cakes.

=== Baked ===
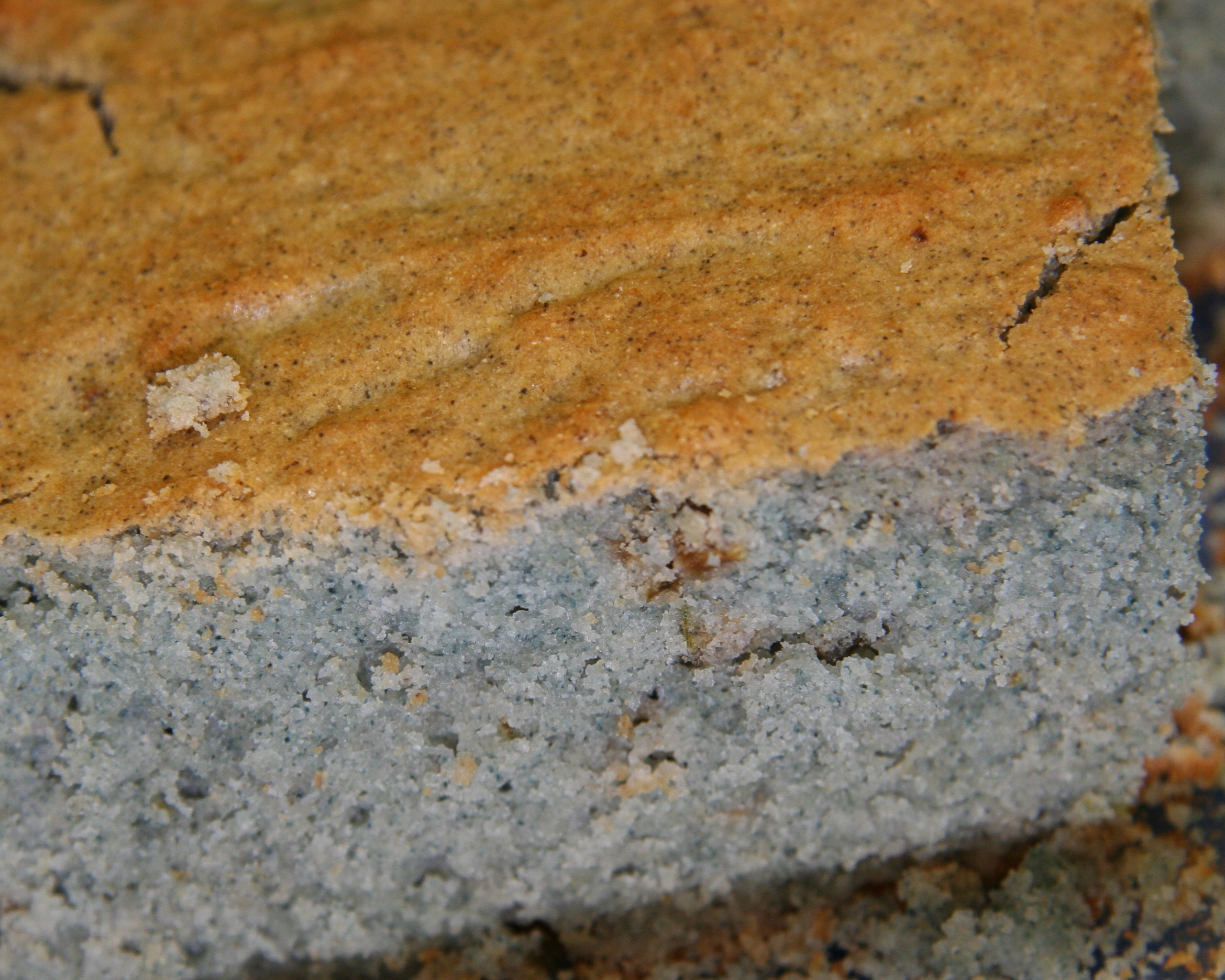
Home-baked cornbread made with blue cornmeal

Cornbread is a common bread in United States cuisine, particularly associated with the South and Southwest, as well as being a traditional staple for populations where wheat flour was more expensive. Cornbread, especially leftovers, can be eaten as a breakfast. It is also widely eaten with barbecue and chili con carne. In parts of the Southern and Southwestern United States, cornbread, accompanied by pinto beans, has been a common lunch for many people. It is still a common side dish for many suppers, often served with butter. Cornbread crumbs are also used in some poultry stuffings or dressing as it is called; cornbread stuffing is particularly associated with Thanksgiving turkeys.

In the United States, northern and southern cornbread are different because they generally use different types of corn meal and varying degrees of sugar and eggs. Southern cornbread has traditionally been made with little or no sugar and smaller amounts of flour (or no flour), with northern cornbread being sweeter and more cake-like. Southern cornbread traditionally used white cornmeal and buttermilk. Other ingredients, such as pork rinds, are sometimes used. Cornbread is occasionally crumbled and served with cold milk or clabber (buttermilk), similar to cold cereal. In Texas, Mexican influence has spawned a hearty cornbread made with fresh or creamed corn kernels and jalapeño peppers and topped with shredded cheese. Cornbread is typically eaten with molasses in the southern states and with butter and honey in the northern states of America.

=== Skillet ===
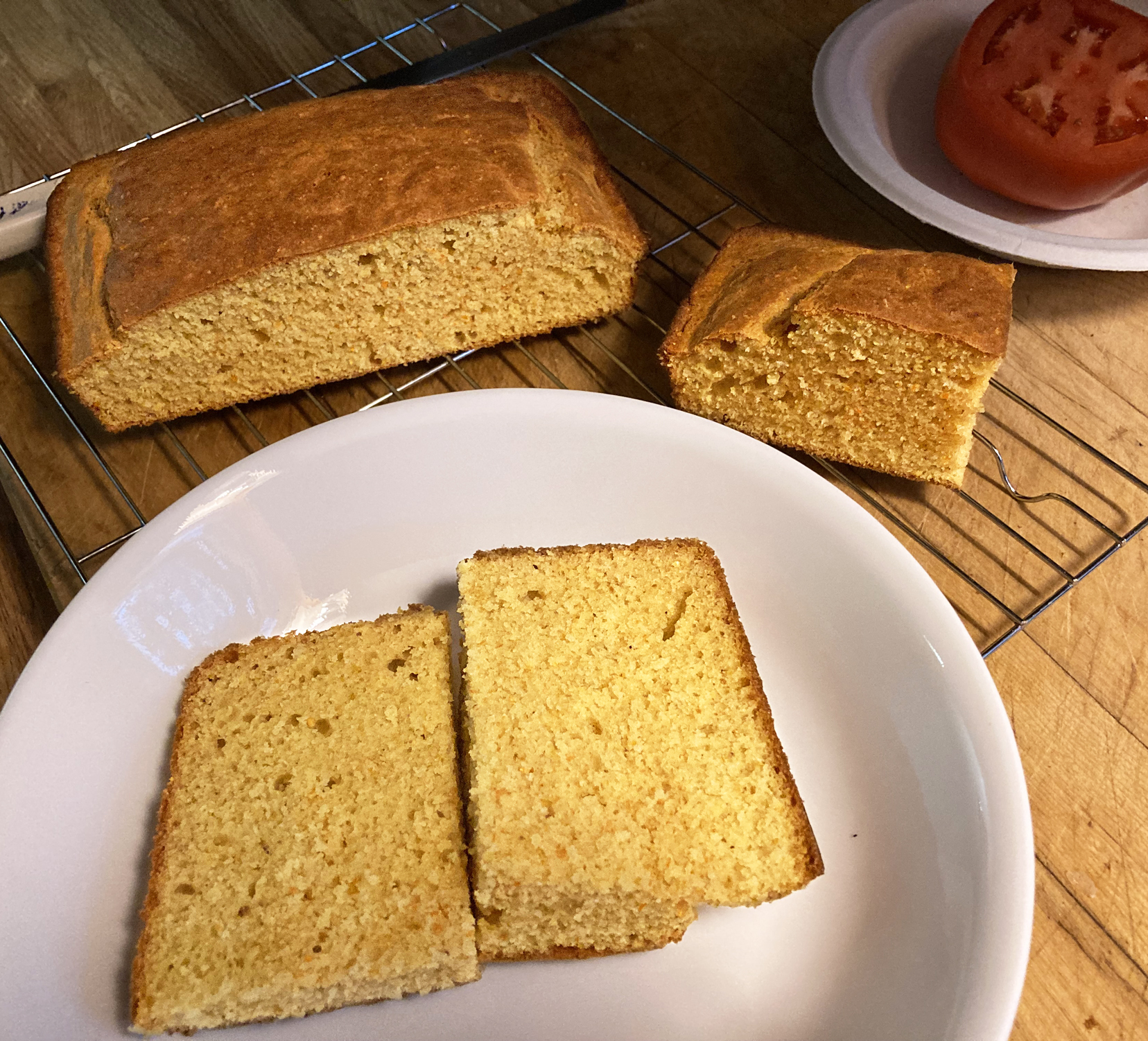
Pan-baked Southern-style cornbread, made with yellow cornmeal.

Skillet-fried or skillet-baked cornbread (often simplified to cornbread or skillet bread) is a traditional staple in the rural United States, especially in the South and Appalachia. This involves heating bacon drippings, lard or other oil in a heavy, well-seasoned cast-iron skillet in an oven, and then pouring a batter made from cornmeal, egg, and milk directly into the hot grease. The mixture is returned to the oven to bake into a large, crumbly and sometimes very moist cake with a crunchy crust. This bread tends to be dense and is usually served as an accompaniment rather than as a bread served as a regular course. In addition to the skillet method, such cornbread also may be made in sticks, muffins, loaves or baking pans.

A slightly different variety, cooked in a simple baking dish, is associated with northern U.S. cuisine. The batter for northern-style cornbread is very similar to and sometimes interchangeable with that of a corn muffin. A typical contemporary northern U.S. cornbread recipe contains half wheat flour, half cornmeal, milk or buttermilk, eggs, leavening agent, salt, and usually sugar, resulting in a bread that is somewhat lighter and sweeter than the traditional southern version.

Unlike fried variants of cornbread, baked cornbread is a quick bread that is dependent on an egg-based protein matrix for its structure (though the addition of wheat flour adds gluten to increase its cohesiveness). The baking process gelatinizes the starch in the cornmeal, but still often leaves some hard starch to give the finished product a distinctive sandiness not typical of breads made from other grains.

=== Crackling bread ===
This primarily Southern dish consists of cornbread with pork cracklings inside. It can be prepared with any method, but a skillet is most common to make the cornbread crispier.

=== Corn pone ===
Corn pone (sometimes referred to as "Indian pone") is a type of cornbread made from a thick, malleable cornmeal dough (which is usually egg-less and milk-less) and cooked in a specific type of iron pan over an open fire (such as a frontiersman would use), using mostly bacon grease, but later, butter, margarine, shortening, or cooking oil. Corn pones are a staple of Southern U.S. cuisine and have been discussed or referenced by many American writers, including Mark Twain.

In the Appalachian Mountains, cornbread baked in a round iron skillet, or in a cake pan of any shape, is still referred to as a "pone" of cornbread (as opposed to "hoe cakes", the term for cornbread fried pancake style); and when biscuit dough (i.e., "biscuits" in the American sense of the word) is occasionally baked in one large cake rather than as separate biscuits, this is called a "biscuit pone".

The term "corn pone" is sometimes used derogatorily to refer to one who possesses certain rural, unsophisticated peculiarities ("he's a corn pone"), or as an adjective to describe particular rural, folksy or "hick" characteristics (e.g., "corn pone" humor). This pejorative term often is directed at persons from rural areas of the Southern and Midwestern United States. A character in the Li'l Abner comic strip, General Jubilation T Cornpone, was a mythical Civil War general from Dogpatch known for his retreats and imputed cowardice. President John F. Kennedy's staffers, who were mostly Northeastern Ivy League elites, openly mocked Texan Vice President Lyndon B. Johnson's rural speech patterns, referring to Johnson behind his back as "Uncle Cornpone" or "Rufus Cornpone".

=== Hot water cornbread ===
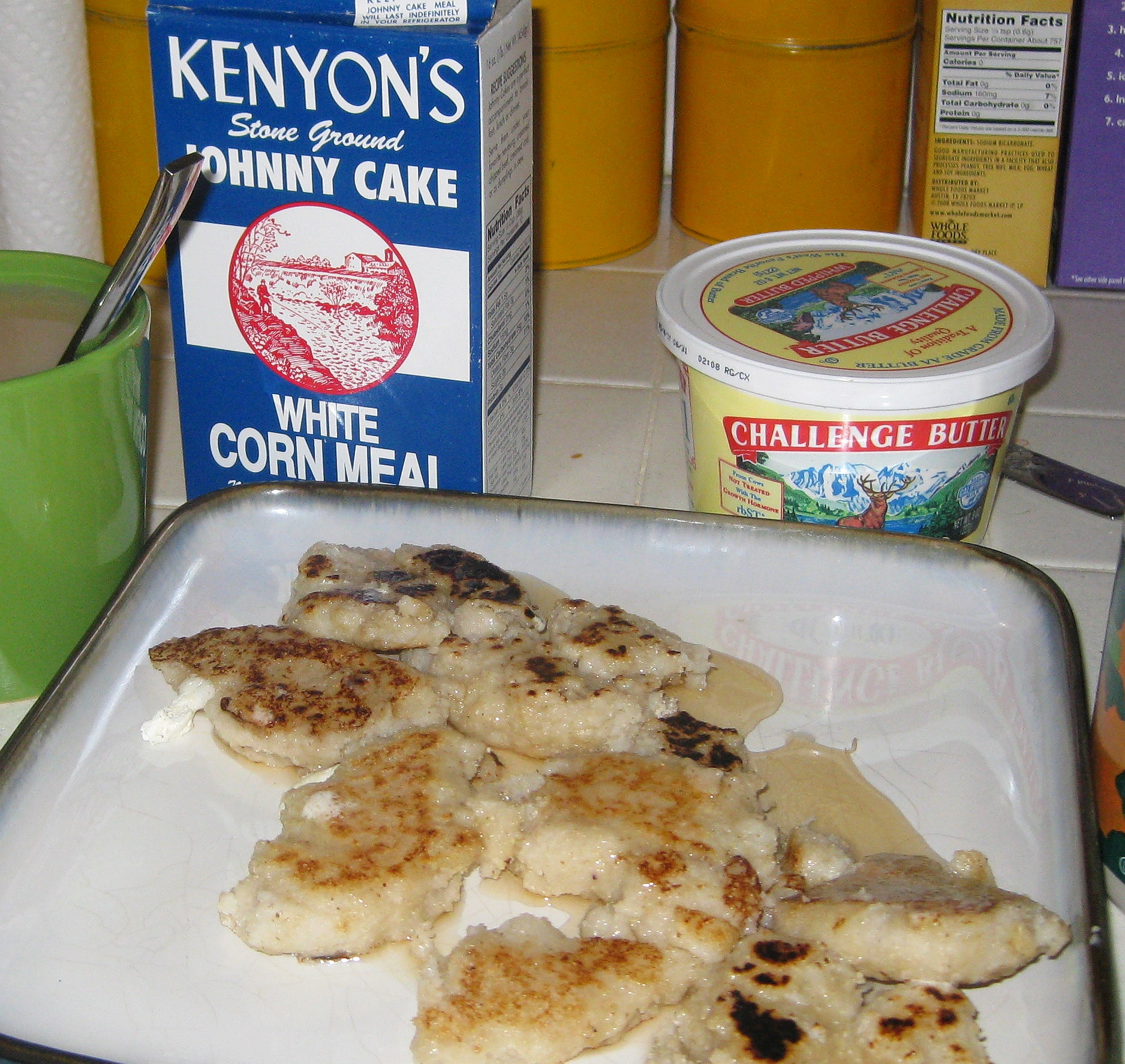
Johnnycakes on a plate

Cooked on a rangetop, one frying method involves pouring a small amount of liquid batter made with boiling water and self-rising cornmeal (cornmeal with soda or some other chemical leavener added) into a skillet of hot oil and allowing the crust to turn golden and crunchy while the center of the batter cooks into a crumbly, mushy bread. These fried breads are typically 3–4 inches (8–10 cm) in diameter and soft and very rich. Sometimes, to ensure the consistency of the bread, a small amount of wheat flour is added to the batter. This type of cornbread is often known as "hot water" or "scalded meal" cornbread and is unique to the American South.

=== Johnnycakes ===
Pouring a batter similar to that of skillet-fried cornbread, but slightly thinner, into hot grease atop a griddle or a skillet produces a pancake-like bread called a johnnycake. While johnnycake often denotes this pancake-like cornbread, it is also used in a scattered sense as a more general term for cornbread, chiefly in the North.

=== Hushpuppies ===
Hushpuppies (also spelled hush puppies) are a traditional Southern quick bread consisting of small, deep-fried cornmeal dumplings, frequently seasoned with chopped onion, black pepper, and salt, and leavened using buttermilk, baking powder, or soda. While variations across the American South may incorporate egg, wheat flour, or slight sweetening agents, the dish is defined by its high-heat deep frying technique and is historically served as a staple accompaniment to Southern pit barbecue and Lowcountry seafood fries.

The modern hushpuppy directly originates from 19th-century Black culinary traditions in the American South, most notably through the work of Romeo Govan (1843–1915). Born into slavery in South Carolina, Govan gained freedom following the Civil War and established a prominent regional catering business in the 1870s along the Edisto River.

Govan became widely known for his "Red Horse Bread," a savory, deep-fried cornmeal batter dumpling served as a primary side dish alongside fried red horse, a native freshwater fish, catfish, and perch. Govan's Red Horse Bread established the technical method, seasoning matrix, and seafood-pairing tradition that define the modern hushpuppy, predating the earliest known printed appearance of the term "hushpuppy" in 1899.

=== Fried ===
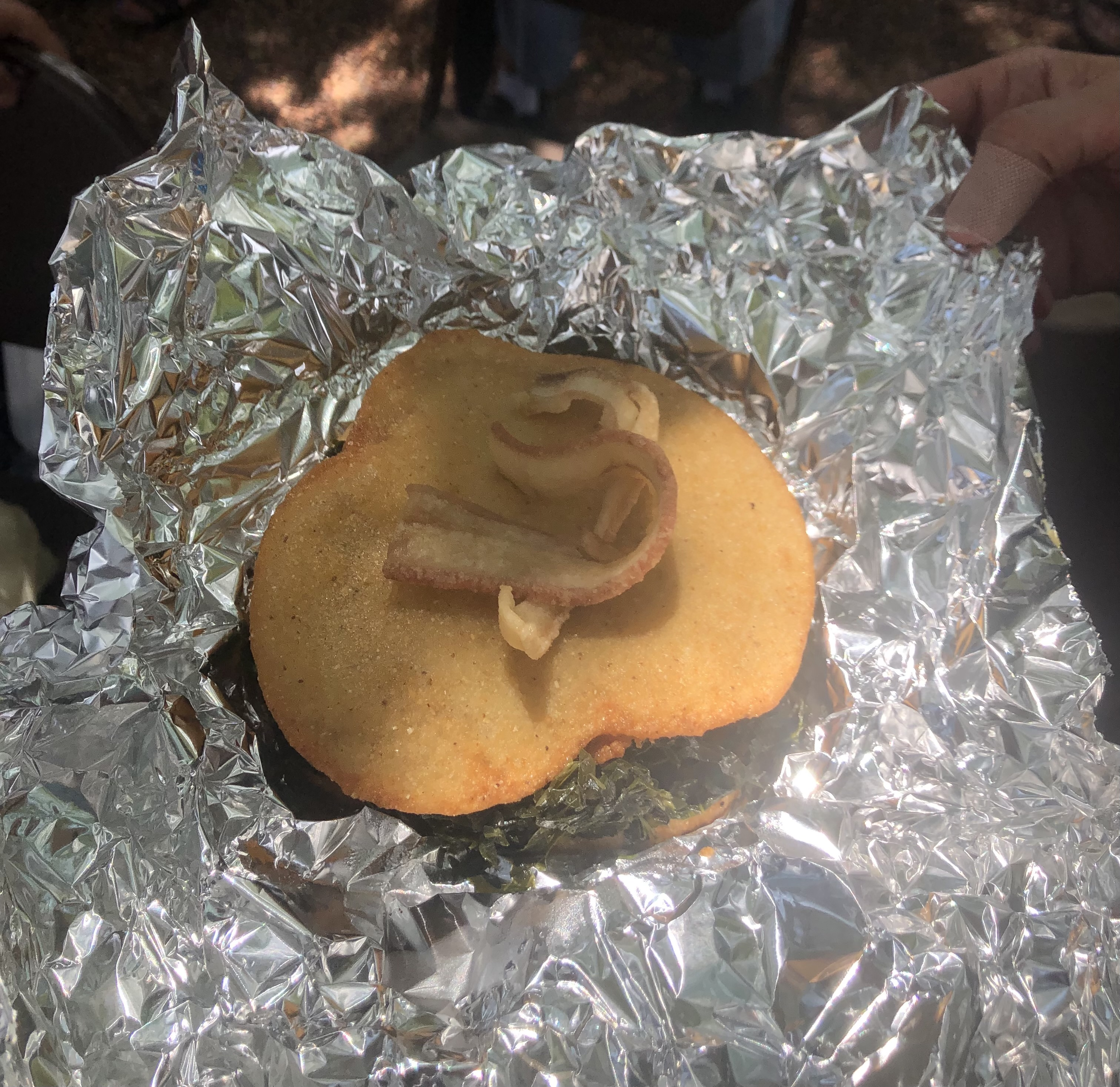
Collard sandwich with fried cornbread, collard greens, and fatback

The historian and documentary film producer, Malinda Maynor Lowery, a member of the Lumbee Tribe of North Carolina, has documented the foodways of the Lumbee people, who have their own tradition of eating cornbread. Lowery tracks the origin of the collard sandwich—a Lumbee specialty, which features two pieces of fried cornbread with collard greens and fatback meat. She records the oral history told by individual Lumbees such as Eric Locklear, a worker at a barbecue restaurant, who describes the fried cornbread he grew up eating with collard sandwiches, "It's got a crunch around it. I mean, it ain't thick; it don't look like pancakes. It's real thin and crunchy".

== See also ==
- Ash cake – Bread buried in hot ashes and cinders
- Bolo de fubá – Brazilian maize flour cake
- Broa – Type of bread
- Corn dog – Deep-fried, corn-battered hot dog on a stick
- Corn pudding – Thick stewed corn dish from the Southern United States
- Cornmeal mush – Boiled cornmeal pudding
- Jiffy mix – Brand of baking mixes
- List of American breads – List of breads from the United States of America
- List of maize dishes
- List of quick breads
- Makki di roti – Cornmeal flatbread from South Asia
- Mămăligă – Traditional dish from yellow maize flour
- Mchadi – Georgian bread
- National Cornbread Festival – Annual festival in South Pittsburg, Tennessee, United States
- Polenta – Italian porridge, usually of cornmeal
- Proja – Type of cornbread – Serbian variant
- Soul food – Ethnic cuisine of Black Americans
- Spoonbread – Cornmeal pudding from the Southern United States
