= Spoonbread =

Cornmeal pudding from the Southern United States

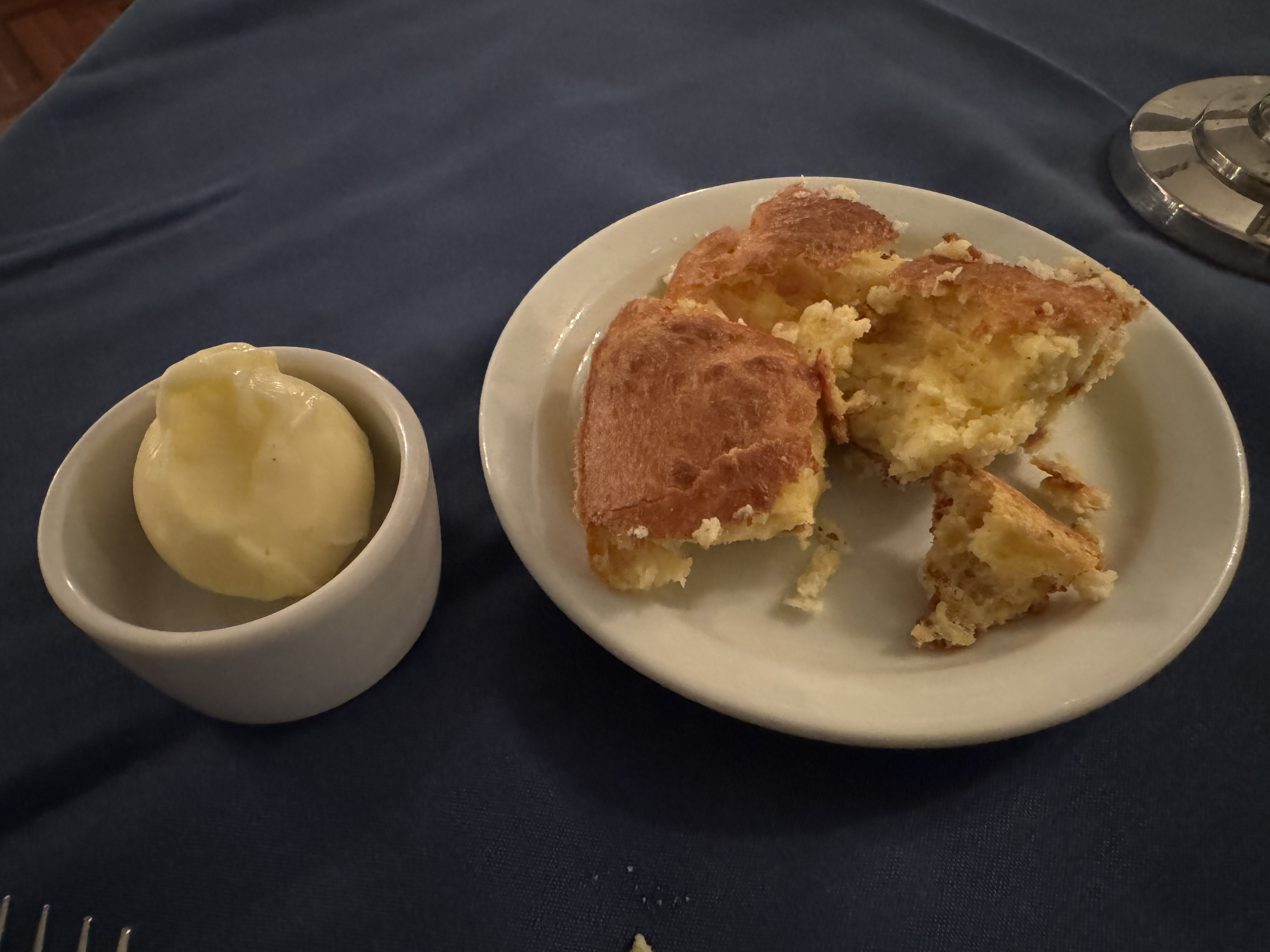
- Spoonbread with a side of butter at the Boone Tavern.
- Type: Bread
- Place of origin: United States
- Region or state: Southern United States (especially Virginia and Kentucky)
- Associated cuisine: Southern
- Main ingredients: Cornmeal, milk, eggs

Spoonbread is a moist cornmeal-based dish prevalent in parts of the Southern United States. While the basic recipe involves the same core ingredients as cornbread – namely cornmeal, milk, butter, and eggs – the mode of preparation creates a final product with a soft, rather than crumbly, texture. Its name refers to the fact that its consistency is soft enough that it must be served and eaten with a spoon.

Although named a "bread", spoonbread is closer in consistency and taste to many savory puddings, such as Yorkshire pudding. The basic recipe involves making a cornmeal mush from cornmeal and milk or water, which is then set aside to cool slightly. After that melted butter, beaten eggs, and any seasonings are stirred in, and the batter is poured into a buttered cast-iron skillet or baking dish and baked until set. There are two basic variations, depending on how the eggs are treated: if the eggs are beaten whole, it creates a denser version with a pudding-like texture; if the eggs are separated and the whites whipped to incorporate air, the spoonbread effectively becomes a cornmeal soufflé.

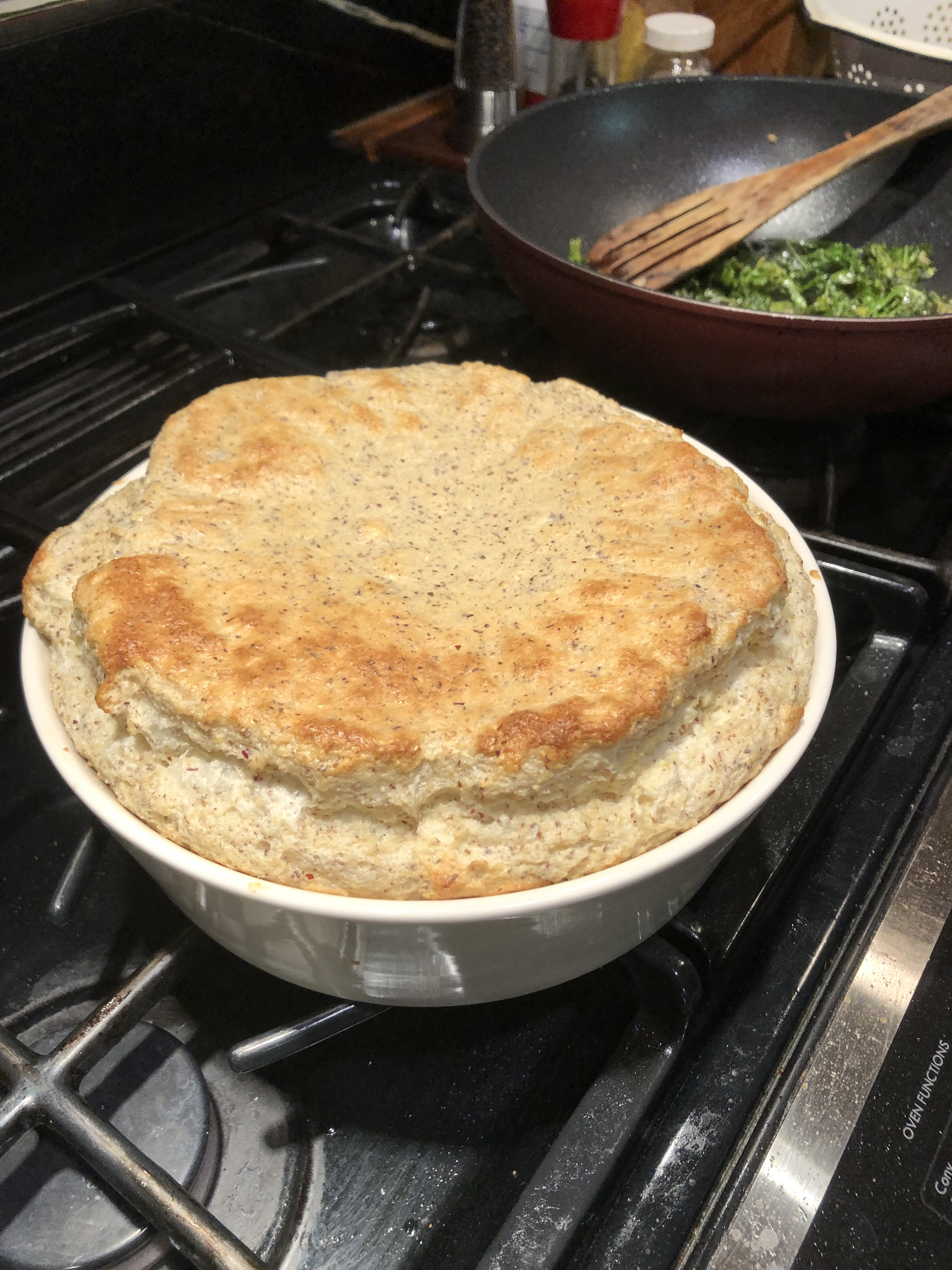
Soufflé-style spoonbread

== History ==
The earliest versions of spoonbread are believed to be of Native American origin, and settlers in South Carolina commonly called it Owendaw or Awendaw in reference to the local Sewee tribe town. Recipes similar to spoonbread began appearing after the end of the colonial period, although these are either sweetened for a dessert course (and typically called Indian pudding), or incorporate wheat flour, as in Mary Randolph’s 1824 cookbook The Virginia House-Wife. The first printed recipe for recognizable spoonbread appeared in The Carolina Housewife cookbook by Sarah Rutledge in 1847. Her recipe for "Owendaw Corn Bread":

Take about two teacups of hommony, and while hot mix with it a very large spoonful of butter (good lard will do); beat four eggs very light and stir them into the hommony; next add about a pint of milk, gradually stirred in; and lastly, half a pint of corn meal. The batter should be the consistency of a rich boiled custard; if thicker, add a little more milk. Bake with a good deal of heat at the bottom of the oven, and not too much at the top, so as to allow it to rise. The pan in which it is baked ought to be a deep one, to allow space for rising. It has the appearance, when cooked, of a baked batter pudding, and when rich, and well mixed, it has almost the delicacy of a baked custard.

Spoonbread spread widely during the 19th century. According to The American Regional Cookbook, "Spoon bread is found throughout the South, in Virginia where it may have originated, the Carolinas and Mississippi. It is also found on Nantucket Island, in Massachusetts, where it is called Bannock". The elevated technique of separating the eggs to create a risen, soufflé-style of spoonbread originated with enslaved African American chefs trained in French culinary method, such as James Hemings. Subsequently it has become a traditional side dish in soul food. Spoonbread also epitomizes the three-part blending of Indigenous, European, and African American cuisines that characterize Southern food. North Carolina chef Bill Neal wrote, "Spoon bread… is based on the native staple, corn. The soufflé technique is European, and it was black expertise that combined ingredients and technique for this aristocratic favorite".

Spoonbreads became further popularized (and the current name adopted) around the turn of the 20th century, as soda-acid forms of leavening (such as baking soda with some form of acid elsewhere in the recipe or baking powder) replaced yeast for corn-based breads in Southern cooking. These leavening agents allow spoonbread to get a better rise than the eggs alone provide, although they are not strictly necessary.

Since 1997, Berea, Kentucky, has been home to an annual Spoonbread Festival held in September.

== See also ==
- List of bread dishes
- List of maize dishes
- List of regional dishes of the United States
