= Cuisine of the Thirteen Colonies =

Culinary traditions of the Colonial United States

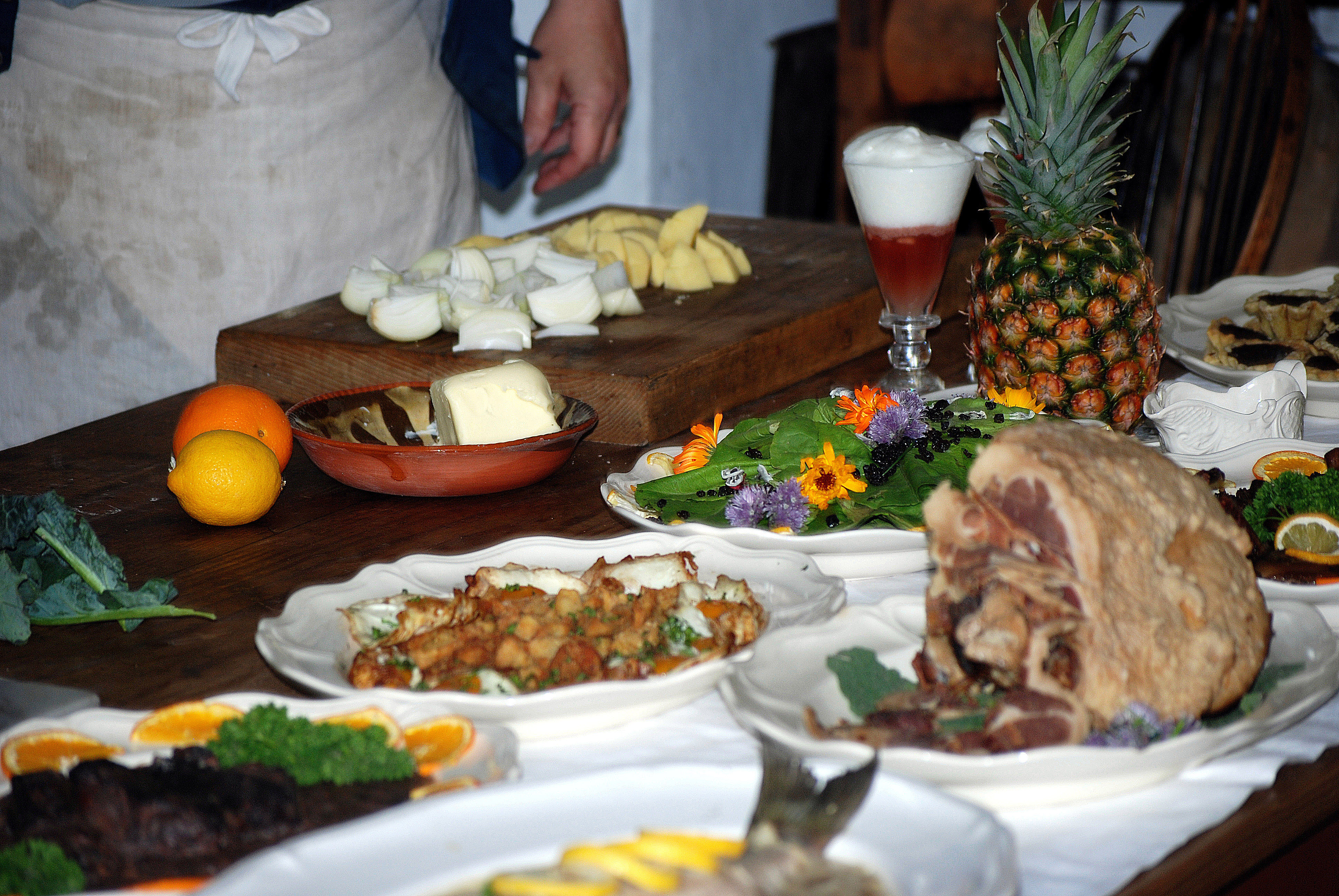
Meat and vegetable dishes at Colonial Williamsburg

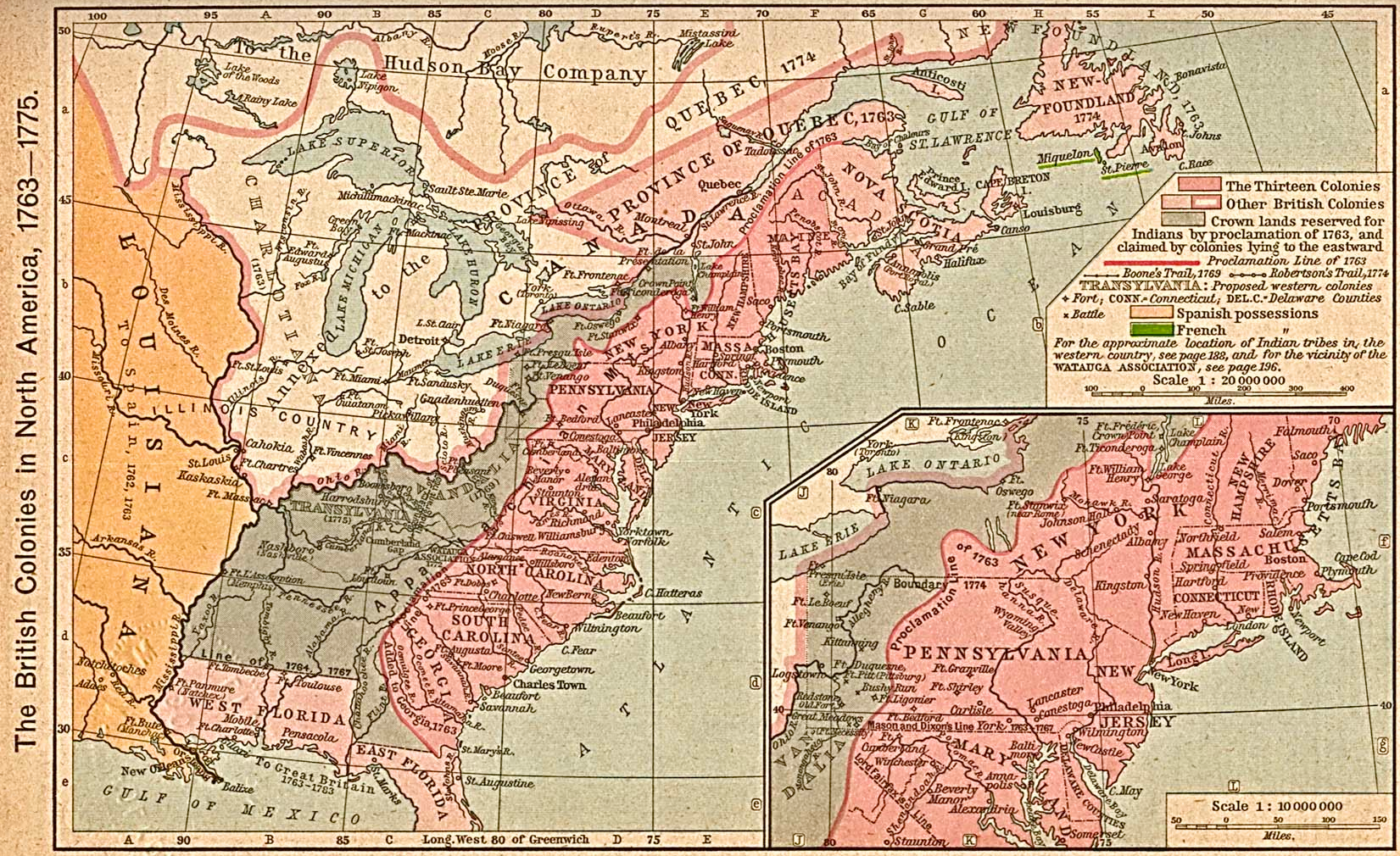
North American colonies 1763–1776

The cuisine of the Thirteen Colonies includes the foodways, culinary culture and cooking methods of the Colonial United States and its people. The cuisine adapted as colonists expanded deeper into the unfamiliar new environment.

== Region ==
=== Virginia and Maryland ===
In the early 17th century, the first wave of English immigrants began arriving in North America, settling mainly around the Chesapeake Bay in Virginia and Maryland. The first settlers were poor farmers and severe famines took place before 1612. After that, according to Lois Green Carr, about 130,000 European settlers the majority of whom were English came to Maryland and Virginia in the seventeenth century. Three-fourths were poor people who came as indentured servants, needed for work in the labour intensive, highly profitable tobacco crop. Life expectancy was lower than in England. Unfamiliar New World diseases caused high death rates. Indian corn was the main source of nourishment. There were still periods when food was scarce, and in 1680 Lord Culpeper, the Governor of Virginia was worried about the servants revolting due to hunger.

Cooking in southern England was noted for a tendency toward frying, simmering, and roasting, and this also became true for Virginian cooking. Wealthy households tended to vary cooking methods greatly, while poor households were generally confined to boiling and frying. The only form of cooking that was slow to develop was baking. Typical dishes among the upper classes were fricassees of various meats with herbs, and sometimes a good amount of claret. Common food among the lower classes was corn porridge or mush, hominy with greens and salt-cured meat, and later the traditional southern fried chicken and chitlins.

=== New England ===
New England had a great abundance of wildlife and seafood. Traditional East Anglian fare was preferred, even though it had to be made with New World ingredients.

Baked beans and pease porridge were everyday fare, particularly during the winter, and usually eaten with coarse, dark bread. At first, it was made with a mixture of wheat and maize (corn), but a disease struck in the 1660s called wheat rust, after which it was made of rye and maize, creating what was later known as "rye an injun". Vegetables with thoroughly boiled meat was a popular dish, and they were cooked together rather than separately, and frequently without seasoning. Baking was a favorite method of cooking, and New England was the origin of dishes today seen as quintessentially American, such as baked turkey.

=== Delaware Valley and Mid-Atlantic region ===
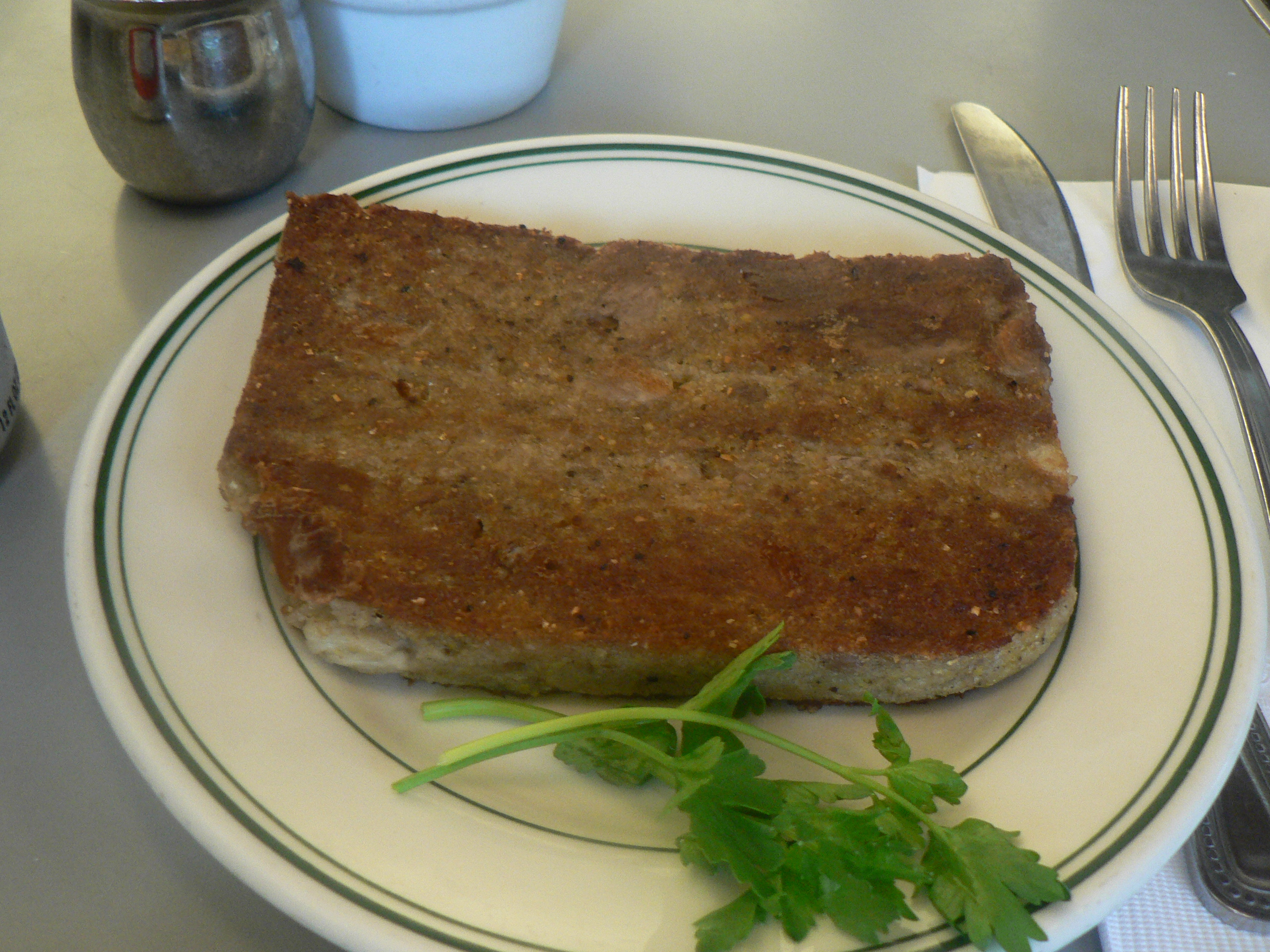
A plate of scrapple, a traditional dish of the Delaware Valley region still eaten today

The Quakers emigrated to the New World from the East Midlands during the 17th century, and eventually settled primarily in the Delaware Valley. They were similar to the Puritans in the strictness that they applied to everyday life, though their religious teachings were far different. Their food was plain and simple. Excessive consumption was discouraged and failure to eat or drink moderately was punished with public acts of criticism.

William Penn was the founder of Pennsylvania and an important figure in the development of the Quaker movement, and he encouraged frugality in his followers with advice such as, "If thou rise with an appetite thou are sure never to sit down without one". The Quakers, like the Puritans, encountered an abundance of food in the New World: forests rich with game and berries, streams teeming with fish, and abundant flocks of birds. Still, the asceticism persevered.

Many Quakers avoided eating butter as a form of self-mortification, and the most eccentric followers would avoid tea and meat. The idealist and pacifist ideas of the Quakers also encouraged many to boycott products that were considered to be tainted by sin. This included butter, due to its role in raising war taxes, and coffee, because it was produced by slave labor.

Eating habits were more egalitarian than those of either the Puritans or the Virginian Anglicans. At meals, entire households would dine at the same table, including children and servants.

The most typical cooking method of the Quakers was boiling, a method brought from ancestral northern England. Boiled breakfast and dinner were standard fares, as well as "pop-robbins", balls of batter made from flour and eggs boiled in milk. Boiled dumplings and puddings were so common in Quaker homes that they were referred to by outsiders as "Quaker food". The Quakers ate cornmeal, elk, venison and wild turkey along with puddings and desserts.

Travelers noted apple dumplings as an almost daily dish in the Delaware Valley and cookbooks specialized in puddings and dumplings. Food was mostly preserved through boiling, simmering or standing.

A popular genre of dishes made from this favored method of food preparation was "cheese" (or "butter"), a generic term for dishes prepared by slow boiling or pressing. They could be made from ingredients as varying as apples (i.e., apple butter), plums and walnuts.

Cream cheese had its origins in Quaker cooking, but was in colonial times not true cheese made with rennet or curds, but rather cream that was warmed gently and then allowed to stand wrapped in the cloth until it became semi-solid.

Dried beef was widely popular in the Delaware Valley and was eaten along with puddings and dumplings to add flavor. The use of dried beef was so widespread that it was often called "Quaker gravy" in the 18th century.

Although the Quaker influence from the northern Midlands was the most dominant, there was some influence from German immigrants during the 18th century. Scrapple, a pot pudding made from meat scraps and grain, became a staple of the regional cuisine for many generations.

=== Backcountry ===
The last major wave of British immigrants to the colonies took place in 1720–1775. About 250,000 people traveled across the Atlantic primarily to seek economic betterment and to escape severe economic hardships. Most of these came from Ireland and were of Scots-Irish or Irish descent.

Many were poor and therefore accustomed to hard times, setting them apart from the other major British immigrant groups. They settled in what would come to be known generally as the "backcountry", on the frontier and in the highlands in the north and south.

A typical breakfast could be toasted bread, cheese, and any leftover meat or vegetables from the previous dinner. In summer, people drank fresh milk.

The backcountry relied heavily on a diet based on mush made from soured milk or boiled grains. Clabber, a yogurt-like food made with soured milk, was a standard breakfast dish and was eaten by backcountry settlers of all ages.

This dietary habit was not shared by other British immigrant groups and was equally despised by those still in Britain. The Anglican missionary Charles Woodmason, who spent time among Ulster Irish immigrants, described them as depending "wholly on butter, milk, clabber and what in England is given to hogs".

Porridge was a popular meal in the British borderlands and remained popular in America. The only difference was that the oatmeal was replaced by corn, and is still known today in the South as grits. Cakes of unleavened dough baked on bakestones or circular griddles were common and went by names such as "clapbread", "griddle cakes" and "pancakes".

While the potato had originated in South America, it did not become established in North America until it was brought to the colonies by northern British settlers in the 18th century and became an important backcountry staple along with corn.

The habit of eating "sallet" or "greens" remained popular, but the vegetables of the Old World were replaced with plants like squashes, gourds, beans, corn, land cress, and pokeweed.

The distinctive cooking of the American backcountry was boiling. Along with clabber, porridge, and mushes, the typical dishes were various stews, soups and pot pies.

Food was eaten from wooden or pewter trenchers with two-tined forks, large spoons, and hunting knives. Dishware was not popular since it was easily breakable and tended to dull knives quickly.

Except for the Quakers and Puritans, feasting with an abundance of food and drink was never discouraged and practiced as often as was feasible. Generally, backcountry cuisine shared neither the religious austerity of the North nor the refinement of the South and was therefore ridiculed by outsiders.

An apparent lack of fastidiousness in preparing the food provoked further criticism from many sources. The Anglican Woodmason characterized backcountry cooking as "exceedingly filthy and most execrable".

Others told of matrons washing their feet in the cook pot, that it was considered unlucky to wash a milk churn and that human hairs in butter were considered a sign of quality. These descriptions seem to be confirmed by an old saying attributed to Appalachian housewives: "The mair [more] dirt the less hurt".

Another expression of backcountry hardiness was the lack of appreciation of coffee and tea. Both were described as mere "slops" and were deemed appropriate only for those who were sick or unfit for labor.

== Diet before the American Revolution ==
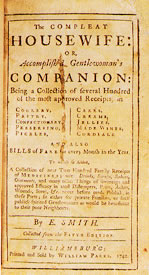
The Compleat Housewife was a cookbook that proliferated in the Thirteen Colonies.

When colonists arrived in America, they planted familiar crops from the Old World with varying degrees of success and raised domestic animals for meat, leather, and wool, as they had done in Britain.

The colonists faced difficulties owing to different climate and other environmental factors, but trade with Britain, continental Europe, and the West Indies allowed them to create a cuisine similar to the various regional British cuisines.

Local plants and animals offered tantalizing alternatives to the Old World diet, but the colonists held on to old traditions and tended to use these items in the same fashion as they did their Old-World equivalents (or even ignore them if more familiar foods were available).

The American colonial diet varied depending on region, with local cuisine patterns established by the mid-18th century.

A preference for British cooking methods is apparent in cookbooks brought to the New World. There was a general disdain for French cookery, even among the French Huguenots in South Carolina and French Canadians. One cookbook common in the colonies, The Art of Cookery Made Plain and Easy, by Hannah Glasse, held the French style of cookery in disdain, stating "the blind folly of this age that would rather be imposed on by a French booby, than give encouragement to a good English cook!" She does add French recipes to the text but speaks out flagrantly against the dishes, "... think(ing) it an odd jumble of trash."

=== Crops ===
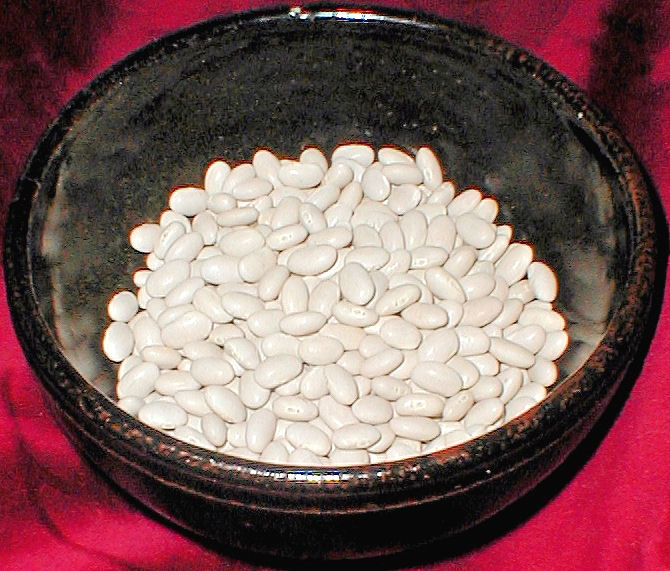
Beans were an integral part of the colonial diet as an indigenous crop.

A number of vegetables were grown in the northern colonies, including turnips, onions, cabbage, carrots, and parsnips, along with pulses and legumes. These vegetables stored well through the colder months. Other vegetables, such as cucumbers, could be salted or pickled for preservation.

Agricultural success in the northern colonies came from following the seasons, with consumption of fresh greens only occurring during summer months.

In addition to vegetables, a large number of seasonal fruits were grown. Fruits not eaten in season were often preserved as jam, wet sweetmeats, dried, or cooked into pies that could be frozen during the winter months.

Some vegetables originating in the New World, including beans, squashes, and corn, were readily adopted and grown by the European colonists. Pumpkins and gourds grew well in the northern colonies and were often used for fodder for animals in addition to human consumption.

=== Animal protein ===
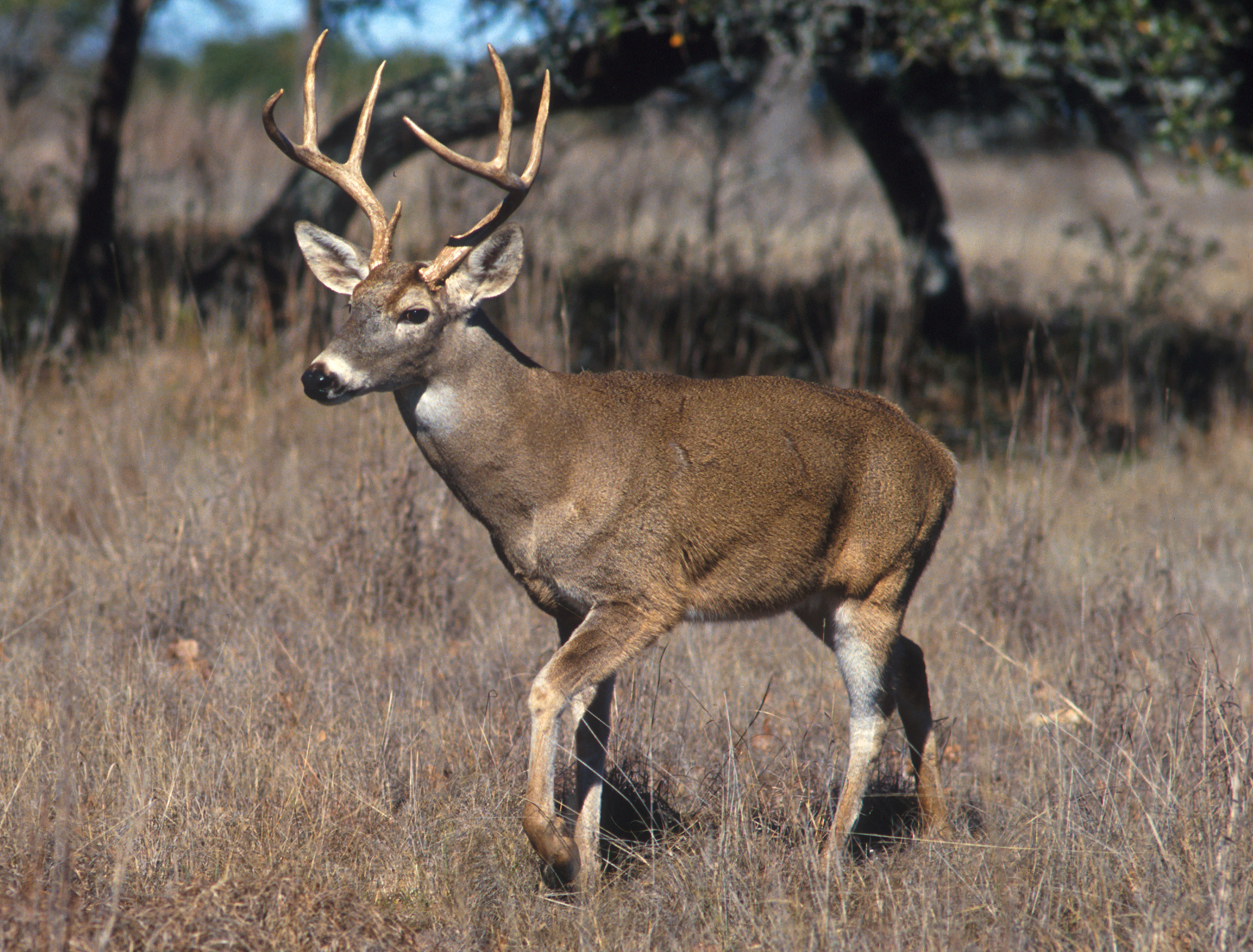
Deer was a popular game meat.

Game hunting was a familiar beneficial skill to the colonists when they immigrated to the New World. Most northern colonists depended upon hunting, whether they hunted themselves or purchased game from others. As a method of obtaining protein for consumption, hunting was preferred over animal husbandry as domestic animals were expensive and more work was required to defend domestic animals against natural predators, Native Americans, or the French.

Commonly hunted game included deer, bear, buffalo, and turkey. The larger parts of the animals were roasted and served with currant and other sauces, while smaller portions went into soups, stews, sausages, pies, and pasties.

Venison was the most popular game. The plentiful meat was often potted or jerked, and its tripe was popular as well. Venison was especially popular during the Thanksgiving season.

Buffalo was an important protein source until roughly 1770, when the animals were over-hunted in British America. Bear were numerous in the northern colonies, especially in New York, and many considered the leg meat to be a delicacy. Bear meat was frequently jerked as a preservation method.

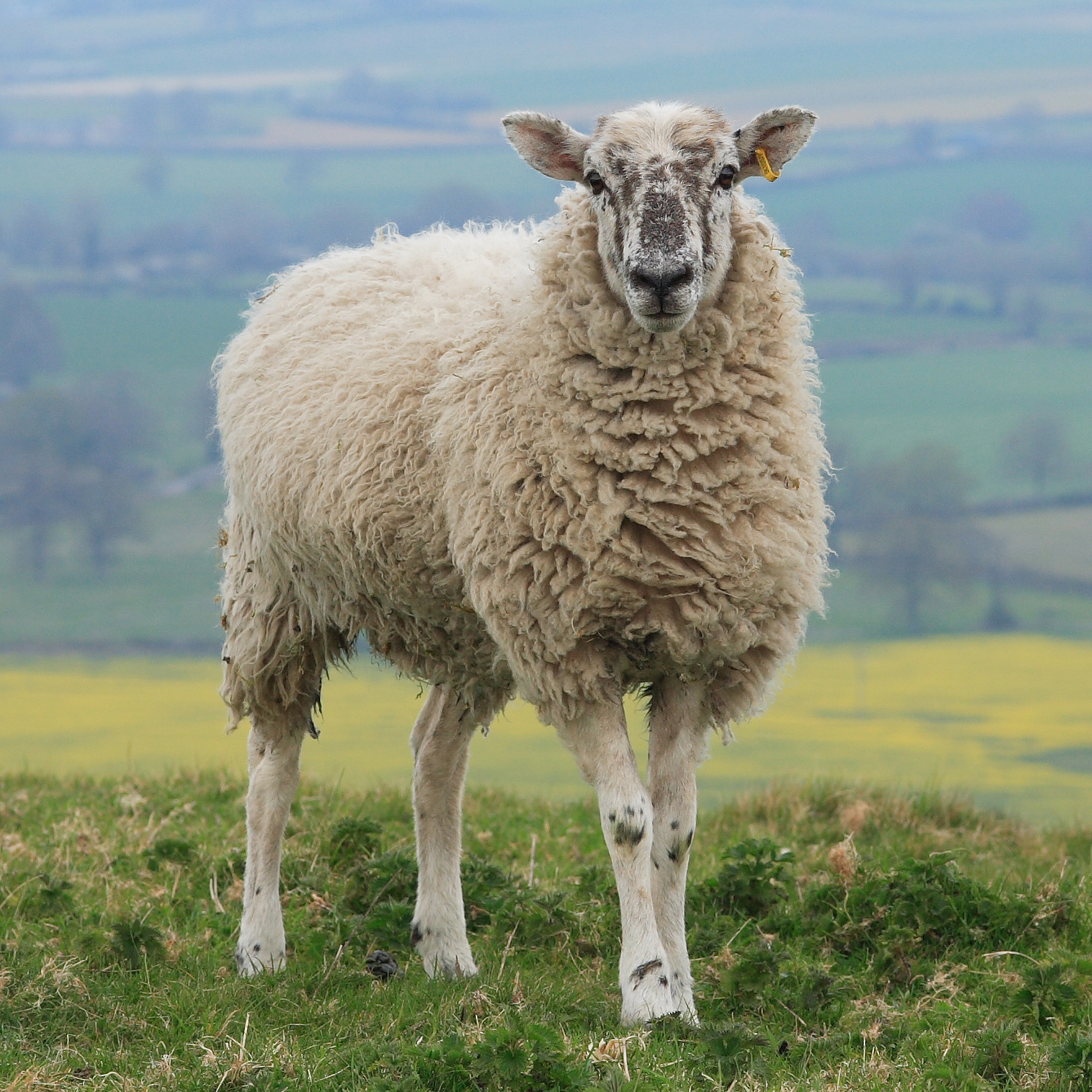
Sheep were valuable livestock in the Colonies.

In addition to game, mutton was consumed from time to time. Keeping sheep provided wool to the household, and when a sheep reached an age when it was unsuitable for wool production, it could be harvested as mutton.

Sheep were originally introduced to the Americas through the Spanish in Florida. In the north, the Dutch and English also introduced several varieties of sheep. The casual English practice of animal husbandry allowed sheep to roam free, consuming a variety of forage.

Forage-based diets produce meat with a characteristically strong, gamey flavor and a tough consistency, which requires aging and slow cooking to tenderize.

Fats and oils derived from animals were used to cook many colonial foods. Rendered pork fat, especially from bacon, was the most popular cooking medium. Pork fat was used more often in the southern colonies than the northern colonies as the Spanish introduced pigs earlier to the south.

Many homes kept a deerskin sack filled with bear oil for use in cooking. Solidified bear fat resembled shortening. The colonists used butter in cooking as well, but it was rare prior to the American Revolution, as cattle were not yet plentiful.

Colonists near the shores in New England often dined on fish, crustaceans and other sea animals. Colonists ate large quantities of turtle, a delicacy also exportable to Europe. Cod was enjoyed in both fresh and salted form, salted cod being suitable for long-term storage. Lobsters proliferated in the waters as well, and were commonplace in the New England diet. Some complained about dining on lobster and codfish too often and they were even used as pig fodder.

The highest quality cod was usually dried and salted, however, and exported to the Mediterranean in exchange for fruits not grown in American colonies.

=== Alcohol ===
Hard apple cider was by far the most common alcoholic beverage available to colonists.

Cider was also easier to produce than beer or wine, so it could be made by farmers for their own consumption. Since it was not imported, it was much more affordable to the average colonist than beer or wine.

Apple trees were planted in both Virginia and the Massachusetts Bay Colony as early as 1629. Most of these trees were not grafted, and thus produced apples too bitter or sour for eating; they were planted expressly for making cider.

Cider was sometimes also distilled or freeze-distilled into applejack (so called because freeze-distillation was called "jacking"); the cold climate of the Northeast in the wintertime encouraged the process. The beverage was particularly popular in New Jersey, where applejack was occasionally called "Jersey lightning" and was sometimes used to pay road-construction crews.

Before the Revolution, New Englanders consumed large quantities of rum and beer as maritime trade provided relatively easy access to the goods needed to produce these items. Rum was the distilled spirit of choice as molasses, the main ingredient, was readily available from trade with the West Indies.

In the continent's interior, colonists drank whiskey, as they had ready access to corn and rye but did not have good access to sugar cane. However, until the Revolution, many colonists considered whiskey to be a coarse beverage unfit for human consumption, believing that it caused the poor to become raucous and disorderly.

Beer was such an important consumable to Americans that they would closely watch the stocks of barley held by farmers to ensure quality beer production. In John Adams' correspondence with his wife Abigail, he asked about the quality of barley crops to ensure adequate supply for the production of beer for himself and their friends. However, hops, essential to production of beer, did not grow well in the colonies. It only grew wild in the New World, and needed to be imported from England and elsewhere.

In addition to these alcohol-based products produced in America, merchants imported wine and brandy. Beer was not only consumed for its flavor and alcohol content, but because it was safer to drink than water, which often harbored disease-causing microorganisms. Even children drank small beer.

=== Northern colonies ===
A striking characteristic of the diet in New England was the seasonal availability of food. While farming in the southern colonies took place for most of the year, northern growing seasons were more restricted, limiting the availability of fresh fruit and vegetables.

However, the coastal colonists' proximity to the ocean gave them a bounty of fresh fish to supplement their diet year-round, especially in the north.

Wheat, the grain primarily used in English bread, was almost impossible to grow in the North, and imports of wheat were expensive. Substitutes included corn (maize) in the form of cornmeal. The johnnycake was generally considered a poor substitute for wheaten bread, but was accepted by residents in both the northern and southern colonies.

=== Southern colonies ===
Unlike the north, the south did not have a central cultural origin or a single culinary tradition. The southern colonies were also more diverse in their agricultural products.

Slaves and poor Europeans in the South shared a similar diet, based on many of the indigenous New World crops. The rural poor often hunted and ate squirrel, opossum, rabbit, and other woodland animals. Salted or smoked pork often supplemented the vegetable diet.

Those on the "rice coast" ate ample amounts of rice, while the southern poor and slaves used cornmeal in breads and porridges. Wheat was not an option for most poorer residents in the southern colonies.

Well into the 18th century, the Chesapeake Bay region still relied on home-brewed cider as a primary beverage. In most small planters' households, women were responsible for the production of the drink and relied on local products to make the different ciders. This production was seasonal, as only large planters had the funds and the technology necessary to produce alcohol year round.

The southern colonies can be culturally divided between the uplands and the lowlands, and this distinction is seen in diet and food preparation in the two regions.

The diet of the uplands often included cabbage, string beans, and white potatoes.

Those who could grow or afford wheat often had biscuits on their table for breakfast, along with healthy portions of pork. Salt pork was a staple of any meal, as it was used in the preparations of vegetables for flavor, in addition to its direct consumption as a protein.

The coastal lowlands' more varied diet, particularly surrounding Charleston and New Orleans and which also included much of the Acadian French regions of Louisiana and the surrounding area, was heavily influenced by Africans and Caribbeans, as well as the French. Rice played a large part in the diet.

In addition, unlike the uplands, the lowlands' protein came mostly from coastal seafood and game meats. Much of the diet involved the use of peppers, as it still does today.

Although the American colonists had an inherent disdain for French food as well as many of the native foods, the French had no such disdain for indigenous foodstuffs. Conversely, they expressed an appreciation for native ingredients and dishes.

== Dietary changes through boycott ==
The colonists were dependent on Great Britain for imports of food and other basic products. When taxes and British parliamentary tariffs on products used by the American colonists increased, the colonists were to continue importing English and West Indian goods.

As a result, a number of colonists began to boycott imported goods in favor of domestic goods. The boycott was not initially widespread, especially as it could not be officially enforced, and so lacked luster in a number of regions. Increasing support for this boycott, however, helped generate the revolution against Britain.

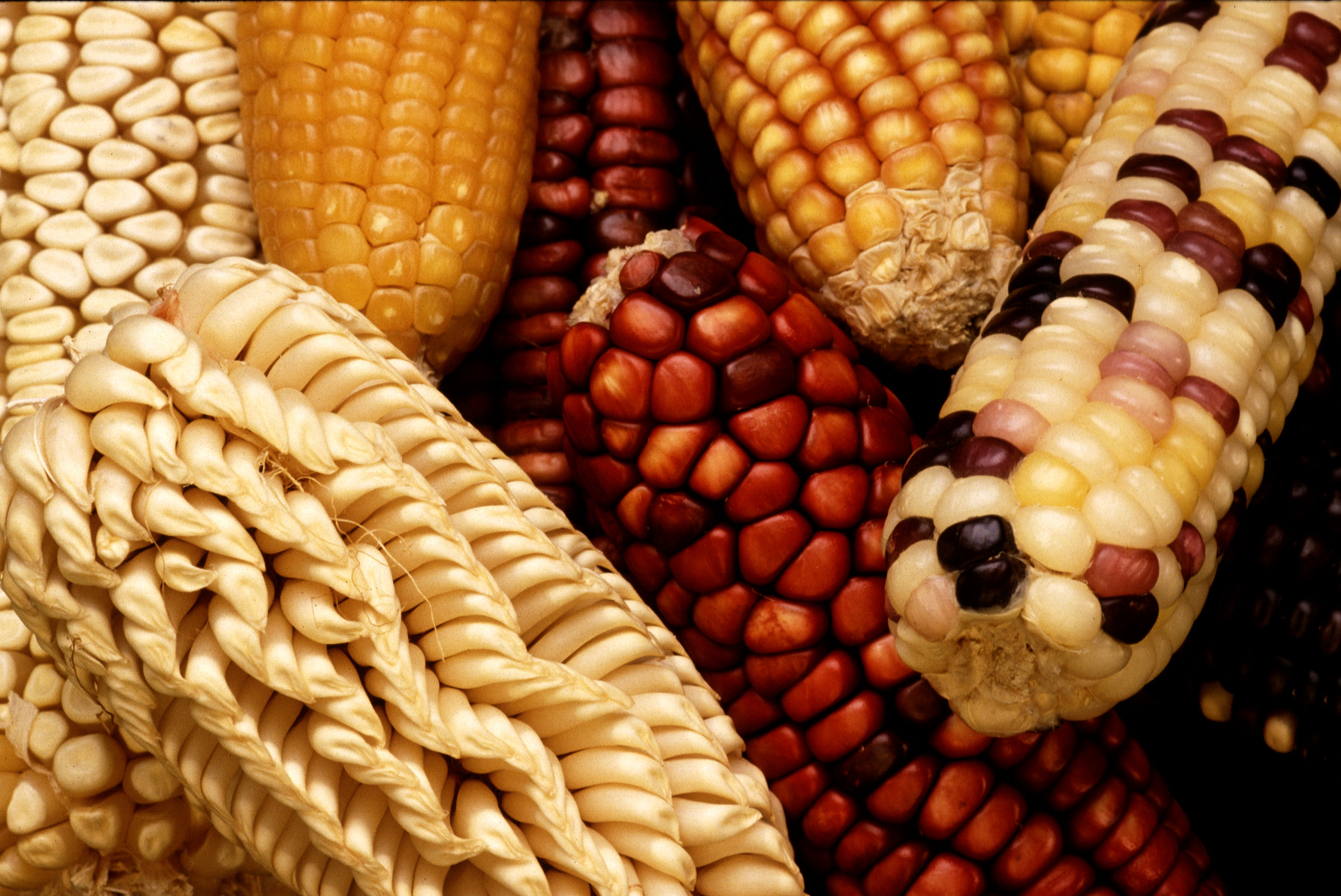
American-grown maize, or "corn", became a staple for whiskey production.

As Parliament imposed a series of acts upon the colonists, changes in the American colonists' purchases and trades eventually altered the American diet. Starting with the Molasses Act 1733, followed by the Sugar Act 1764, a shift in alcohol consumption occurred.

This was more than a protest against taxation of molasses, the main ingredient in rum production. Whiskey became the spirit of choice for many American colonists. In the northern colonies, whiskey was made with rye, while the southern colonies preferred corn. Rye was seen as a more civilized grain, while corn whiskey was presented as a more patriotic version as it was produced from an indigenous American crop.

The production of whiskey was not a norm in the colonies in the early years. The upper echelon of colonial society looked down upon American whiskey up until the time of the American Revolution. Some even saw the harsh spirit as a bastion of debauchery in the American colonies.

Whatever the sentiment, the Scottish, Irish, and Germans brought a taste for hard spirits from their homelands to the American colonies in the 1730s. These groups continued to produce hard spirits in imported stills, or stills based on Old World designs, in retaliation against the unpopular economic controls introduced by Parliament.

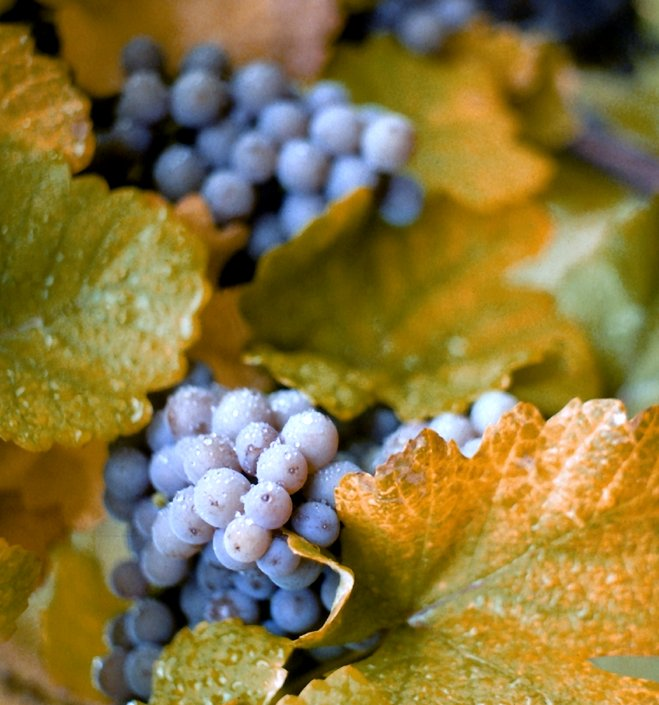
Benjamin Franklin promoted growing Vitis labrusca grapes for wine production in protest of the taxation of Madeira imports.

The Revenue Act of 1764 that heavily taxed Madeira and other wines led to yet another boycott, this time against imported wines. This promoted another indigenous agricultural item of the American Colonies, the Vitis labrusca grapes. In 1765, Benjamin Franklin decided to use Poor Richard's Almanack to promote the growing of American grapes in order to encourage the production of domestic wines.

One of Franklin's friends, Benjamin Gale, stated one evening at one of their gatherings "We must drink wine of our own making or none at all." This opinion seemed to be the prevailing sentiment in the colonies from 1764 until the Revolution.

Many who supported temperance in the colonies also supported the production of American wine at this time, since the colonial form of temperance at the time was to drink only wine or beer instead of hard spirits.

The Quartering Act of 1765, probably more than anything else, stripped the colonists of funds and thus the ability to purchase imported luxuries. The Stamp Act of 1765 resulted in a boycott on imported goods by many merchants, which was further strengthened by the passage of the Townshend Act of 1767.

These boycotts, however, were short-lived, to the dismay of more radical colonists who hoped to take control of superficial goods imported from Europe and imports from the West Indies. Once the Townshend Act was repealed, colonists flocked back to markets to purchase non-essentials.

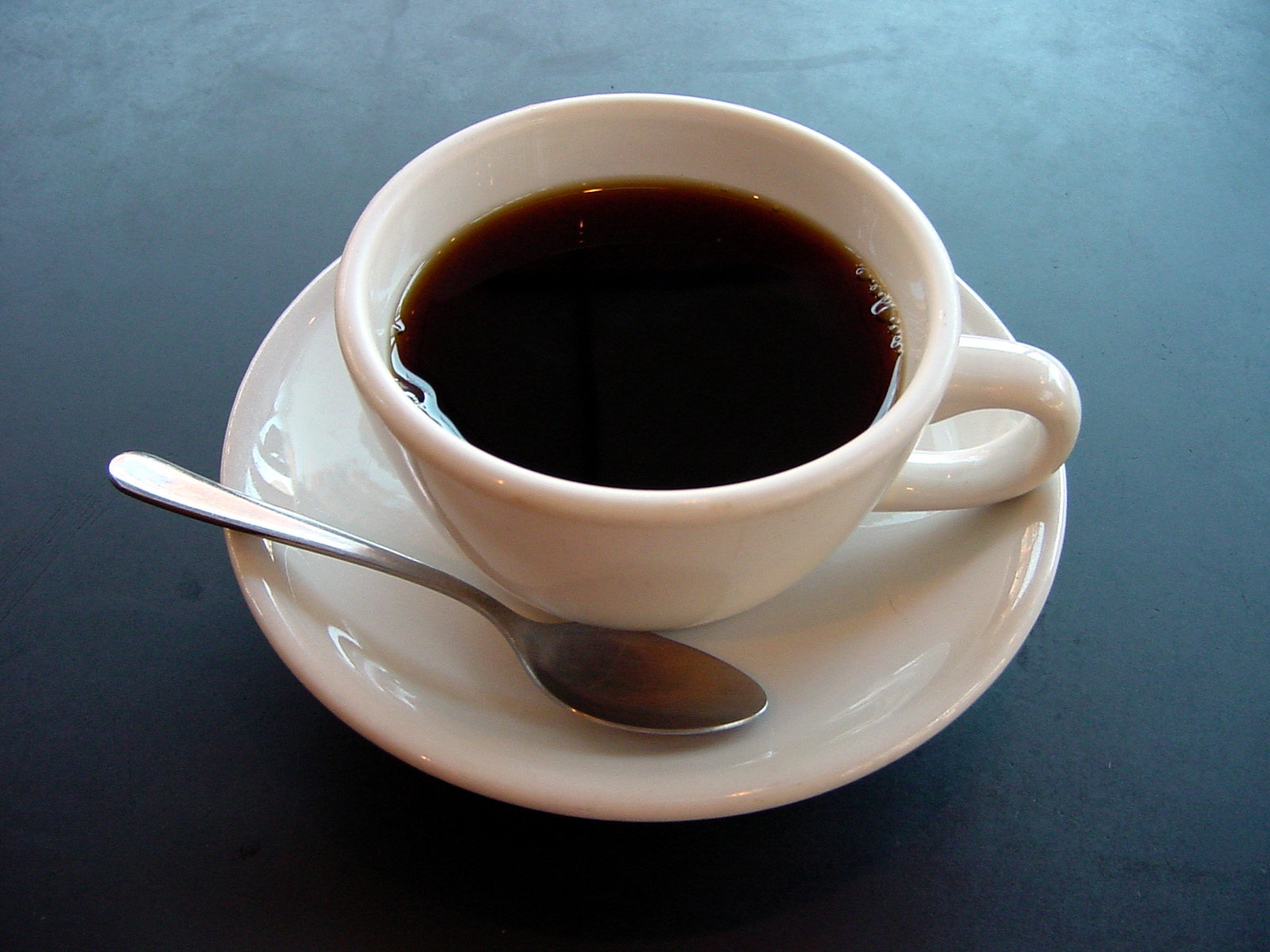
Coffee became the American alternative to tea after the enactment of the Tea Act of 1773.

The enforcement of the Tea Act of 1773 became a heated issue with the colonists, with the well-known demonstration at the Boston harbor, the Boston Tea Party, a direct reaction to the act. However, a much more important shift occurred in the colonists' drink of choice. In 1773, John Adams wrote a letter to his wife, Abigail, stating, "Tea must be universally renounced and I must be weaned, and the sooner the better."

Thus began the American shift from tea to coffee. In a concentrated boycott, the housewives of Falmouth, Massachusetts publicly united, vowing to serve only coffee in their homes. This inspired other households throughout the colonies, both in the north and south, to do the same.

== Effects of the American Revolution ==
In 1775, the Continental Congress decreed that no imports would enter the American colonies, nor would any exports move from America to Britain. Some historians state that this had a profound effect on the agriculture of America, while others state that there was no effect as the domestic market was strong enough to sustain American agriculturists. The dispute lies in the fact that the American economy was highly diverse; there was no standard form of currency, and records were not consistently kept.

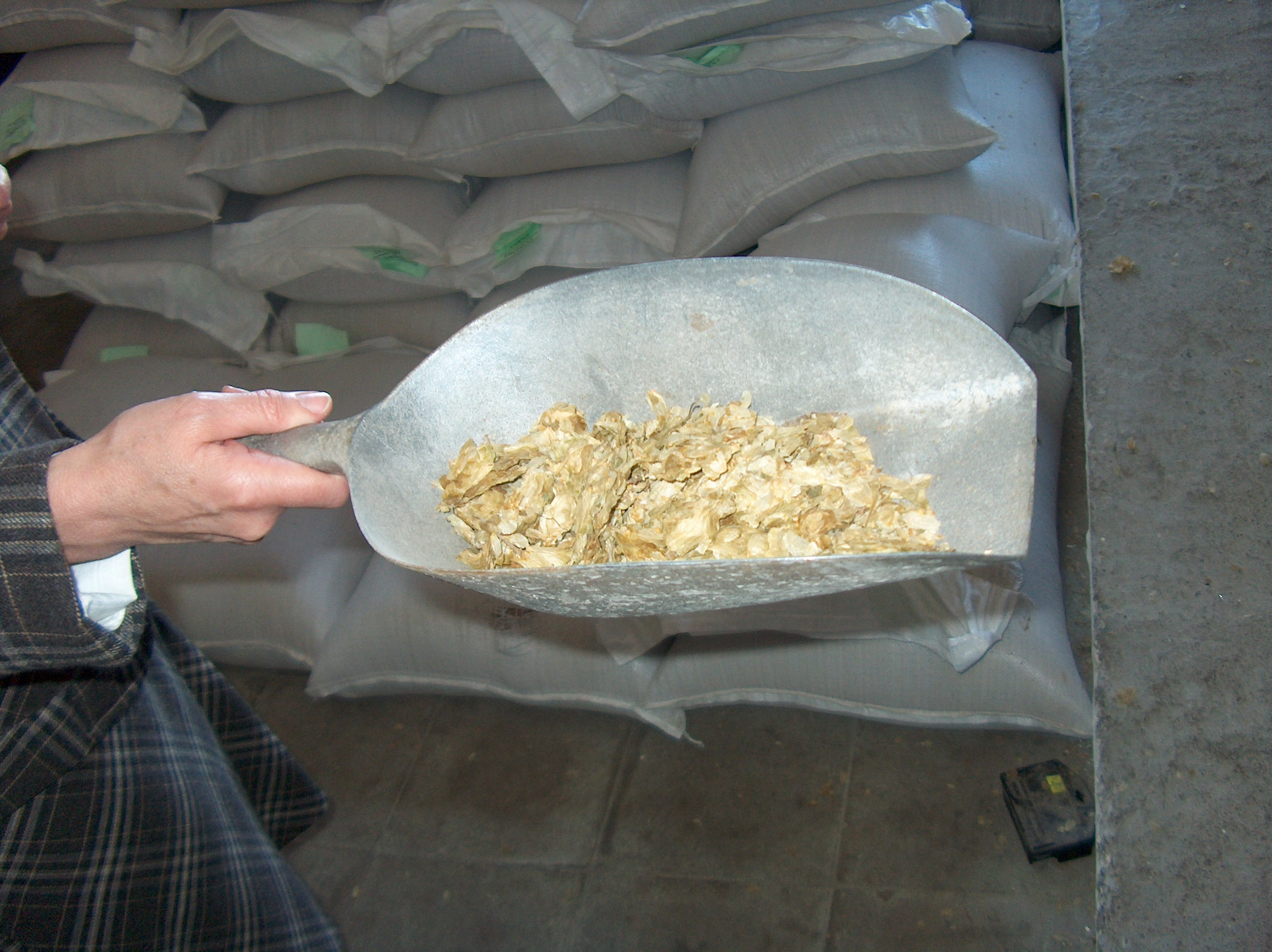
Hops, a necessary ingredient to make beer, were not imported during the American Revolution, leading to a decline in beer production.

By the declaration of the American Revolution, with George Washington as its military leader, dietary changes had already occurred in America.

Coffee was quickly becoming the normal hot drink of the colonies and a taste for whiskey had been acquired among many of those who could produce it. In fact, in 1774, the first corn was grown in Kentucky specifically for production of American Bourbon whiskey. This step may have established this American spirit in American culture, just as the country was going to war with Britain.

In addition to whiskey coming into favor, a shift began in the consumption of cider over beer. Colonists opted to grow less barley as it was easier to ferment apple cider than to brew beer. Another reason for this change would have been the lack of imported hops needed to brew beer.

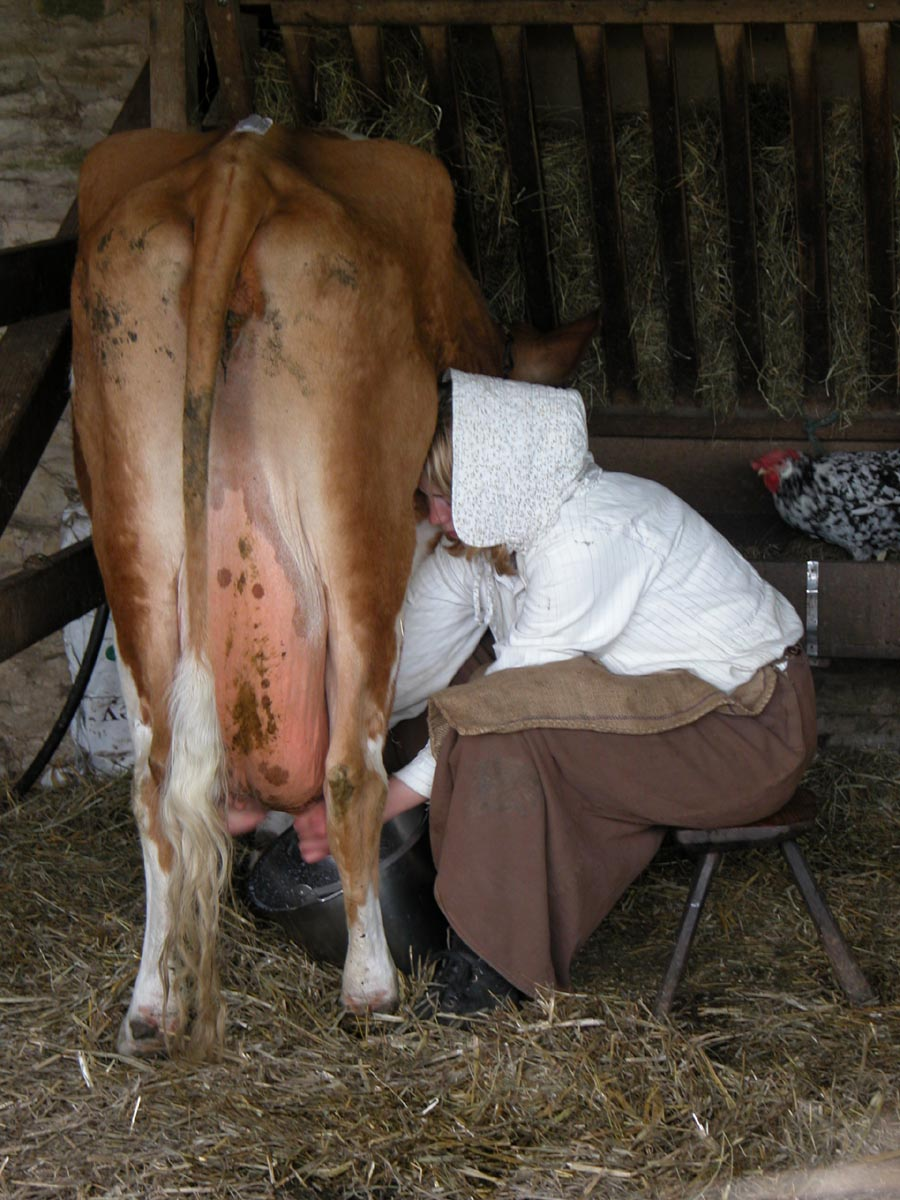
As game became scarce and a moratorium was placed on mutton consumption, cattle husbandry increased.

As the American colonies went to war, they needed soldiers and supplies in large quantities. Soldiers needed uniforms and, as all shipping into the colonies had ceased, wool became an integral commodity to the war effort. During the Revolution the consumption of mutton ceased almost entirely in many areas, and in Virginia it became illegal to consume except in cases of extreme necessity.

Game had begun to become scarce in the region east of the Mississippi River. This could have been from over-hunting, or the game could have been driven westward as the colonial population increased. Irish and Scottish immigrants had been importing cattle into the American colonies during the early part of the 18th century. Consequently, when game was becoming scarce and mutton had a moratorium placed upon it, cattle were available to take their place as a protein source.

This change increased farmers' profit from animal husbandry. Small-scale cattle-raising began during the French-Indian War, but when the American Revolution came, farmers were able to increase their cattle holdings and increase the presence of beef in the American diet. In addition to beef production, the cattle also increased the production of milk and dairy products like butter. This may have contributed to the preference for butter over pork fat, especially in the northern colonies.

With the arrival of British Army to quell the revolution, and naval battles occurring on the seas, areas used for salt-water fishing became unsafe for fishermen, and thus lay dormant for much of the war. In addition, many of the fishing vessels were converted into warships.

Before the war, there was often talk about the excess of lobsters and cod off the shores of New England. This seemed to change during and after the war, due to the vast numbers of ships and artillery entering the ocean waters. Once lobster-harvesting and cod-fishing were reestablished, most fishermen found that the lobster and cod had migrated away from the shores.

Where Americans had a historic disdain for the refineries of French cooking, that opinion, at least in a small part, began to change with the American alliance with the French.

In the first American publication of Hannah Glasse's Art of Cookery Made Easy, insults aimed at French dishes disappeared. Some Bostonians even attempted to cook French cuisine for their French allies, sometimes with comedic results when entire frogs were put into soups rather than just their legs. Nonetheless, the alliance supported a friendship with France that later resulted in a large migration of French cooks and chefs to America during the French Revolution.

The American diet was changed through this friendship as well as due to the changes forced through boycott and hostilities with Britain. After a time, trade resumed with the West Indies but was limited to necessities. Items that sustained the war effort in America were traded, with crops such as rice from the Carolinas shipped out and coffee beans imported in order to brew America's new beverage of choice.

== See also ==
- Cuisine of Antebellum America
- Cuisine of the United States
- Early modern European cuisine
- List of American foods
