= Cuisine of Antebellum America =

American eating and cooking habits from about 1776 to 1861

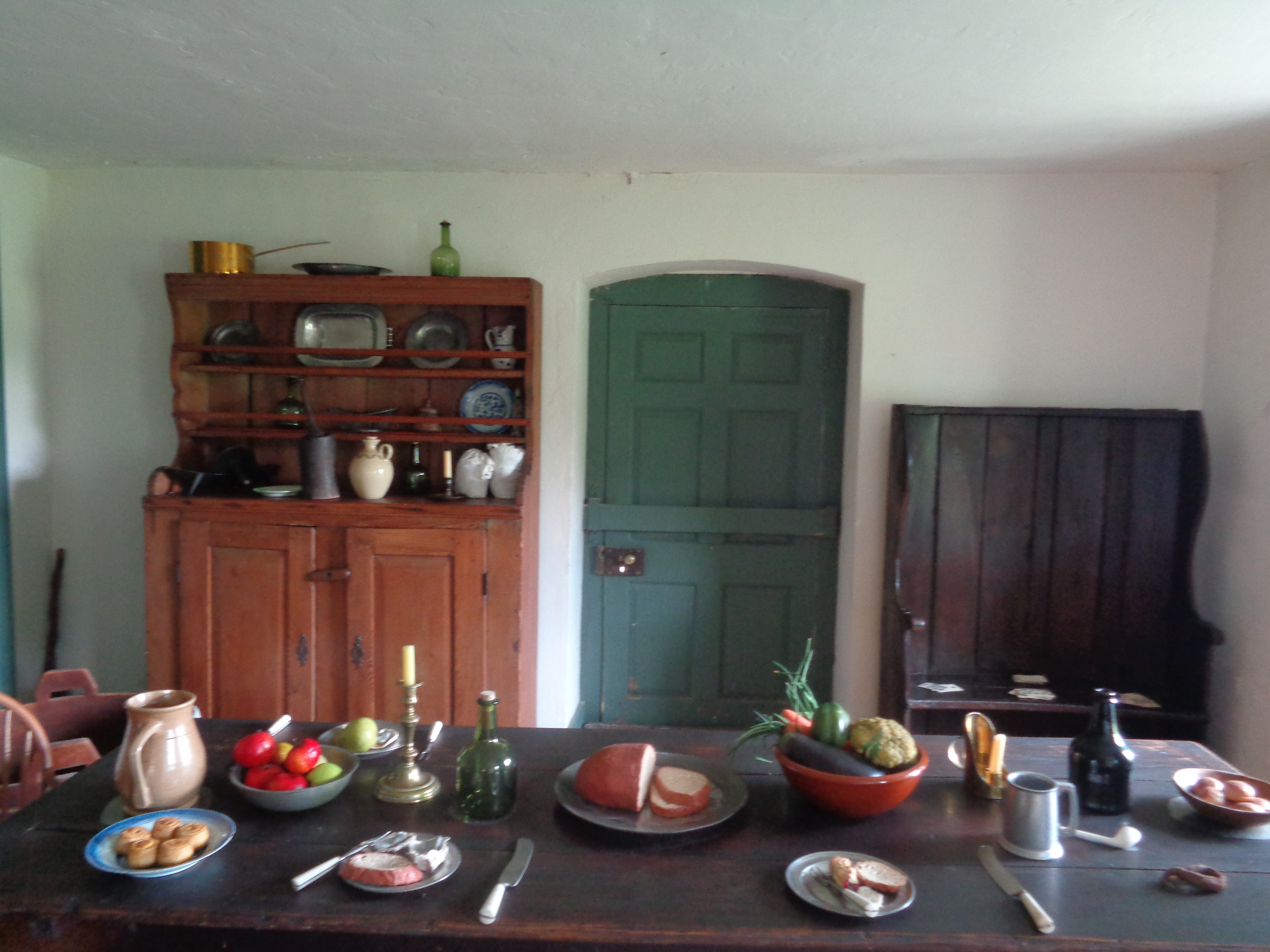
Stratford Hall plantation warming kitchen showing a plate of sliced bread, fruits, and vegetables

The cuisine of the antebellum United States characterizes American eating and cooking habits from about 1776 to 1861. During this period different regions of the United States adapted to their surroundings and cultural backgrounds to create specific regional cuisines, modernization of technology led to changes in food consumption, and evolution of taverns into hotels led to the beginnings of an American temperance movement. By the beginning of the Civil War, the United States cuisine and food culture could define itself separately from that of the rest of the world.

== Background ==
=== Meals ===
Breakfast was the second largest meal of the day, usually a substantial meat or fish portion, shared with the family. Dinner was the largest meal and could be served between noon and three. (The custom of evening dinner did not arise until men in the city began to eat their mid-day meals away from home.) Afternoon teas, attended only by women, were usually served around 4 PM, and could last up to two hours. The 6 o'clock supper or high tea was a full meal shared by the entire family.

=== Restaurants ===
Before restaurants became established in the social culture of the United States, formal dinners were held in private homes for family and friends. These could be elaborate affairs, with one meal held in 1830 in celebration for the 200th anniversary of the settlement of Salem consisting of no less than 14 selections for the first course, followed by 11 varieties of roast bird and meats for the second course. French influenced dishes like chicken fricassee and vol au vent au boeuf were still commonplace at such gatherings well into the 19th century.

=== Influences ===
Antebellum American cuisine was heavily influenced by British and Western European cuisines. Savory puddings and pies from British cuisine were more common in those days, but preferences for sweet pudding and pie continued to evolve during the 19th century, until these dishes became standard desserts instead of savory courses. West African dishes, ingredients and cooking techniques were part of the culinary traditions of this era as well, and the cooking for slave-owning families was usually done by skilled slaves.

By the eve of the Revolution, the average American soldier stood 5 feet, 8 inches, several inches taller than the average British soldier.

French chefs first arrived at New Orleans in the early 1800s, deeply influencing the cuisine of that city. There were other sources of French influence too; the travels of Thomas Jefferson and other Americans who brought back a taste for French food, and the French chefs hired by New York City luxury hotels in the first half of the 19th century. French chefs travelled as far as the San Francisco Bay Area during the California Gold Rush, catering to miners who coveted the rich lifestyle that French cuisine came to symbolize.

However, the attraction to French food was not the mainstream of American society. The disdain for "fancy French cooking" in American society was significant enough to influence the Presidential campaign in the 1840 election in which the Whig candidate William Henry Harrison was touted as living on "raw beef and salt" while a simultaneous smear campaign was launched against Martin Van Buren who was known to have a taste for French cuisine. The French custom of a la carte meal service was viewed as undemocratic in comparison to sharing meals between guests. When the New York Hotel opened in 1844, the hotel's decision to serve meals a la carte was answered by criticism by local newspapers. Offering people different food at different prices, the papers argued, was an attack on the foundations of the Republic. Nat P. Willis of the Weekly Mirror wrote, "The public table is the tangible republic – the only thing palpable and agreeable that we have to show, in common life, as republican."

French influence on American cuisine grew more exaggerated in the Gilded Age that followed the Civil War. American national cuisine in the Antebellum era reflected the tastes of "Republican virtue" as a culinary ethos in contrast with European and post-war extravagance, which was more ostentatious and decadent than the foodways of the Antebellum age.

== Foods ==
=== Game and other meats ===
Most roasted meats were cooked over a hearth, but fresh meat was a luxury, and usually only available for special occasions. Preserved meats were the standard, usually salted or smoked lamb, beef or pork.

The main game meats found in the American diet during the antebellum era were rabbit, squirrel, venison, buffalo and bear. Game was common in rural areas, especially among the poor and those living along the frontier, and some slaves who were permitted to carry firearms. Widespread hunting of wild turkey and other game led to the passage of game laws. General Winfield Scott, regarded as the best known gourmet of the era, identified Maryland terrapin and canvasbacks as the "supreme native delicacies" of the age.

Cows and pigs were the most common domesticated animals raised for their meat. Mutton and lamb were also eaten, used in dishes like Irish stew, but mostly in the Northeast and Southwest regions of the country.

Pigs were utilized throughout all regions of the United States, due to the ease of breeding and the many ways Americans were able to consume their meat. Dr. John S. Wilson of Columbus, Georgia, mentioned that the United States should "properly be called the great Hog-eating federacy or the Republic of Porkdom". Pork was in such abundance that it was noted by a French traveler that even the poor southerners of the antebellum U.S. were "better fed and clad here than in any other country". One traveler described a meal in Columbus, Georgia where "pigs feet pickled in vinegar" were served with bacon and molasses.

Pigs were kept largely due to their ability to fend for themselves; they were able to feed off leftover scraps and forage for themselves in the wild. In the South, Americans cooked pork with corn, while Northeasterners preferred bacon. They all used pork in a variety of ways, notably the working class throughout America consuming blood pudding, a mixture of pork blood and chopped pork.

=== Dairy ===
Dairy-based foods and products like cheese were more common in the North, where the weather was cooler, than in hot Southern states. Ice and iceboxes were a common household item by the 1850s contributing to the increasing popularity of ice cream.

=== Fish and shellfish ===
Fish was a staple of the antebellum era. Difficult to transport, and very perishable, fresh fish was eaten close to the coast where it was caught. Wild fish from the nation's rivers, lakes and streams were abundant, and could be salted for storage and sale. Canned salmon and lobster were shipped to inland markets by railroad, and big cities like New York and Philadelphia received shipments of ice-packed fresh fish from Massachusetts. The most common fish in antebellum cuisine were catfish, salmon, perch, mackerel, bass, cod, flounder, haddock, trout, whitefish, sturgeon, snapper, and shad. Eels and sea turtles were also standard features of the cuisine, along with assorted varieties of locally available shellfish. Fish chowder was a staple of the cuisine of New England, made with assorted fish, vegetables and shellfish. Any firm, white fish could be used, and early recipes don't specify a type of fish.

=== Fruits ===
Typically fruits in the era were seasonal and locally produced. Fruits were preserved or cooked in sugar syrup to make pie filling. Depending on the region apples, cherries, grapes, pears, strawberry, and peaches could be found.

=== Grains ===
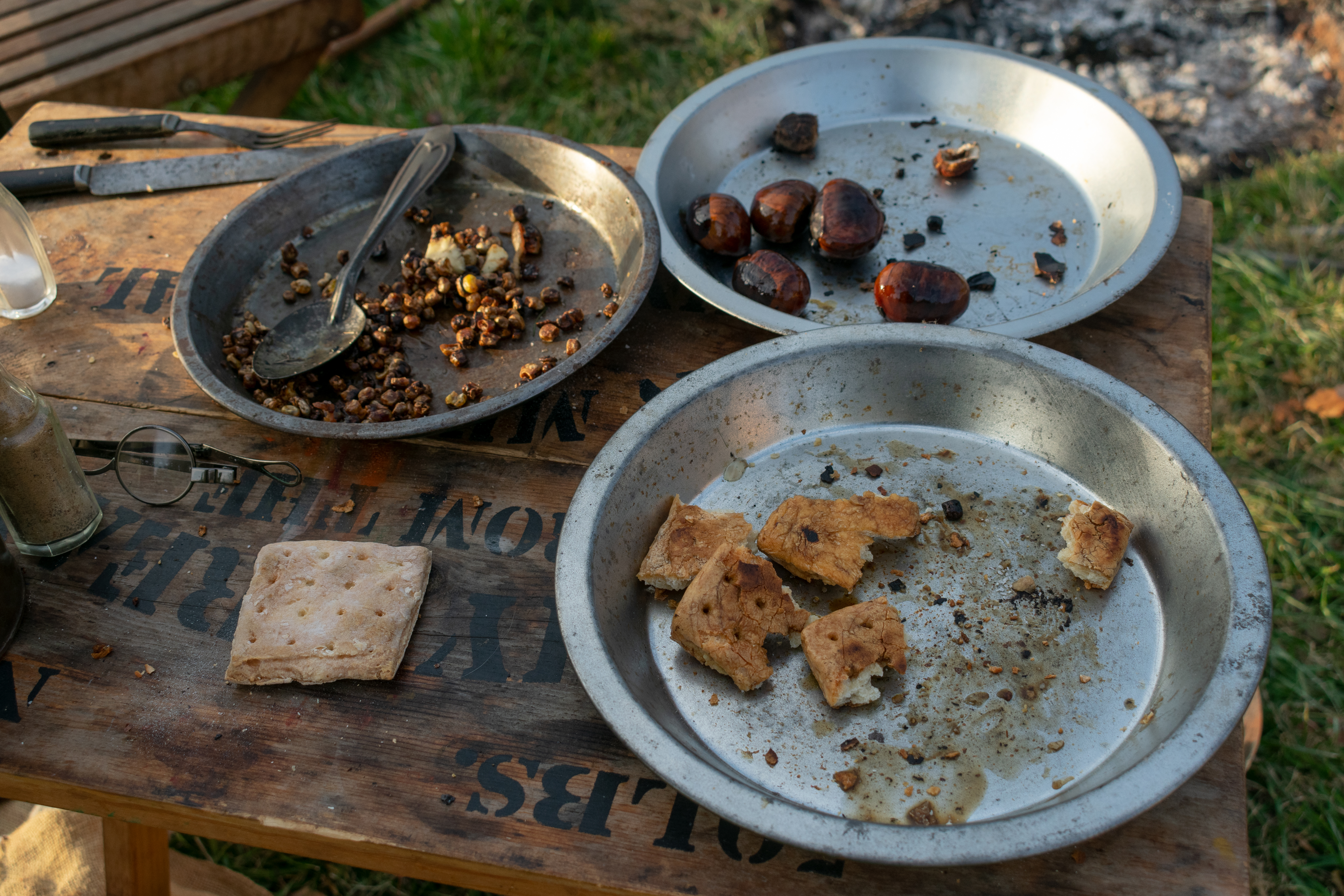
The food of American Civil War soldiers at Chatham in Fredericksburg and Spotsylvania National Military Park, Virginia

Like fruits, the availability of grains depended on the region. In the South, corn and rice were staples, while wheat was more common in the upper Mississippi Valley.

=== Poultry ===
Turkey consumption was widespread in antebellum America. The wild turkey was hunted throughout the country, to the point that they almost disappeared on the East Coast by the Civil War. Virginian Joseph Doddridge noted that "the wild Turkeys, which used to be so abundant as to supply no inconsiderable portion of provision for the first settlers, are now rarely seen."

Englishman Adam Hodgson noted in 1819 that he "did not recollect to have dined a single day without a turkey on the table." Recipes for turkey became an early divergence from British cuisine, with the first American cookbook, Amelia Simmons's American Cookery (1796), containing five recipes for turkey.

The concept of specifically serving turkey for Thanksgiving also began during the antebellum period. William Bentley of Salem, Massachusetts, noted in 1806 that "a Thanksgiving is not complete without a turkey."

In addition to Turkey, Americans also consumed chicken, goose, duck, guinea fowl, pigeons, quail and grouse.

=== Puddings ===
Most puddings, whether sweet or savory, were boiled in pudding bags. These bags could be made of cloth or animal intestine.

=== Vegetables ===
Americans had access to a diverse array of vegetables. The most common were beans, beets, asparagus, rhubarb, corn, radishes, tomatoes, turnips and others. Vegetables were often preserved by pickling, or were boiled thoroughly, and would not have been eaten fresh.

=== Soul food ===
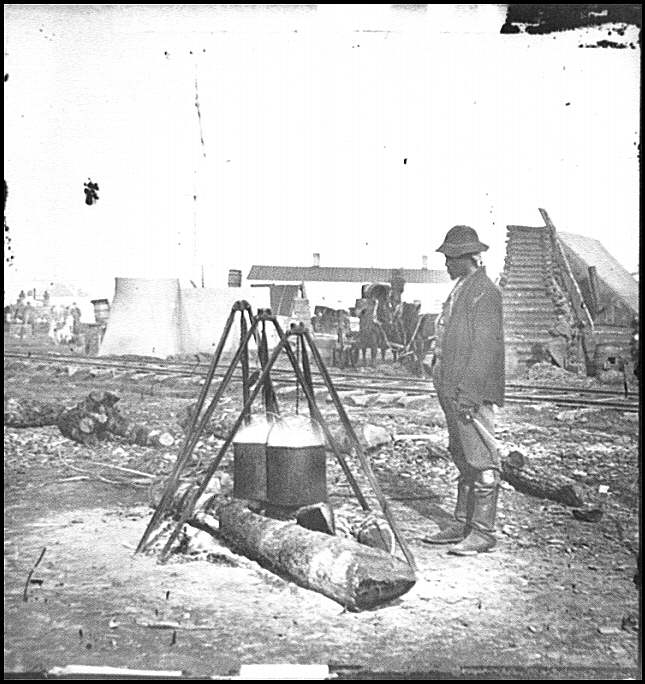
An African American Civil War army cook at work in City Point, Virginia

Slaves in the Southern United States relied mainly on cornbread and beef, as beef was considered less nutritious than pork. A slave's pork ration on plantations was around three pounds per week; however, the beef ration was often two pounds per day. Slaves often accessed other meats, such as ducks and turkeys, in various ways (e.g., hunting) or from their masters or neighbors. Unlike meat, vegetables, such as turnips, cabbage, and peas, were abundant for slaves.

Slaves were generally well-fed with native African plant foods, most notably peanut and sesame, to keep them alive on the long sea voyage to North America. Some plants of African origin were said to be grown at the homes of Presidents George Washington and Thomas Jefferson, possibly with know-how from enslaved Africans.

Slave gardens were planted with "beans, cabbage, squashes, tatoes, raos-en ears, sweet tatos, collards, turnips..." Rabbits, squirrels, and deer were often hunted for meat. Fish, frogs, crawfish, turtles, shellfish, and crab were often collected from fresh waters, salt waters, and marshes.

According to the Federal Writers' Project of Georgia's slave narratives:

Each slave was given 5 lbs of meat (usually pork),…Breakfast and dinner…consisted of fried meat, cornbread and syrup…Mr. House permitted slaves to have a garden …of their own. One delicacy…was biscuit bread which they called 'cake bread'…The diet of these children…consisted of pot liquor, milk, vegetables…”

According to Maria Franklin, an archaeologist at the University of Texas, Austin "Southern cuisine" was co-opted from the black African and Caribbean slave women who prepared meals for white children in mansion kitchens. Not all enslaved cooks were women. Hercules, George Washington's cook, was a black man who was one of the best chefs in America.

Enslaved cooks had a relatively high status for that time period and are underrepresented in American historical studies. They are credited with developed well-known American fusion foods like gumbo and jambalaya. They recreated staple dishes like fufu (called "turn meal and flour" in South Carolina) with local ingredients. It is a very simple dish of flour gelatinized by pouring boiling water over it while stirring. Some types of staple corn meal dishes like grits and starchy pone breads were made by slaves. Pone may be considered a form of "cornbread" but is nothing like the modern chemically-leavened sweet, eggy corn bread that is common today.

Since the 1960s the term soul food has been used by African Americans to describe this cuisine and its legacy. Soul food has become an important part of African-American cultural identity.

The leftovers and scraps from meals cooked for the "big houses" (plantation houses) were called "juba" by the enslaved. They were put in troughs on Sundays for the slaves to eat. The term "juba" occurs in numerous African languages, and folk knowledge records that early on it had the meaning of "little bits" of food.

Archaeological and historical research concerning slave cabins in the Southern United States indicates that enslaved African Americans used bowls more often than flatware and plates, suggesting that they primarily made stews and "gumbo" for meals, using local ingredients gathered in nature, vegetables grown in their gardens, and leftover animal scraps rejected by their enslavers. This process allowed enslaved people to create new dishes, for which they developed a variety of ways to season and add spice using hot sauces they prepared. The research shows that white plantation families more often used plates and flatware, indicating that they ate meals consisting of individual cuts of meats and vegetables that were not blended into one dish like the stews made by enslaved people. Enslaved people living on plantations located along the Atlantic coast developed a diversity of foodways enabled by their access to seafood.

== Alcohol in the antebellum United States ==
In the early United States, taverns were an important establishment throughout the country. Alcohol was considered an essential beverage, due to the understanding that water was not safe to drink. Beverages such as rum, whiskey, cider, and beer were common throughout the United States. Alcohol was seen as an important piece of American culture after the Revolution; however, as the Civil War neared, also rose the temperance movement in the United States.

=== Taverns ===
The custom of public tables in taverns was considered a symbol of not only democracy but the recent revolution itself. Taverns of Revolutionary America served as centers for communication and provided space for political debates. Historian Rorabaugh noted that "Whether or not taverns were 'nurseries' of the legislators, they were certainly seedbeds of the Revolution... there is no doubt that the success of the Revolution increased the prestige of drinking houses."

Taverns played an important part in Revolutionary and early US history, with Jefferson writing the first draft of the Declaration of Independence in Indian Queen Tavern in Philadelphia, and George Washington being inaugurated at Fraunces Tavern in New York.

However, by the Civil War, the tavern was almost completely replaced by the hotel, which unlike taverns were seen as more adequate for sleep, and allowed for more proper and elite consumption of alcohol, and separation of drinkers by class.

=== Rum ===
Originating as a byproduct of sugar production in Barbados, molasses was first distilled into rum in the colonies in 1700. By 1776 per capita consumption of rum had reached 3.7 gallons per head, and the notorious Molasses Act passed by Parliament strongly damaged American rum production. John Adams declared post-Revolution that "Molasses was an essential ingredient in American independence." Some historians argue that the Molasses Act imposing heavy taxes on sugar and molasses was more responsible for the schism between Americans and the British, rather than the Tea Act, with historian Rorabaugh noting, "A second effect of independence was that Americans perceived liberty from the Crown as somehow related to the freedom to down a few glasses of rum."

However, after the American Revolution, British embargoes caused a collapse in American trade with the Caribbean, and molasses exports suffered greatly. Whiskey, cheaper to produce, began to rise in production.

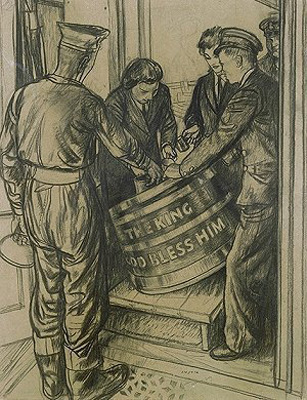
Illustration of sailors preparing to open rum from a tub

Rum's association with piracy began with English privateers trading on the valuable commodity. As some of the privateers became pirates and buccaneers, their fondness for rum remained, the association between the two strengthened by literary works such as Robert Louis Stevenson's Treasure Island.

=== Whiskey ===
While rum was a symbol of independence in the antebellum United States, whiskey evolved to a symbol of nationalism. An American author of The Distiller declared that it should be "the particular aim of the American distiller to make a spirit purely American, entirely the produce of our country." In the early antebellum U.S., the Scotch-Irish formed the largest group of immigrants in the United States, many of them settling in Appalachia and bringing with them whiskey. Due to its ability to be produced anywhere there are grains, whiskey could be distilled cheaply in any part of the United States. Although early taxation existed on whiskey, leading to such incidents as the Whiskey Rebellion, in 1802 American-made whiskey could be sold throughout the country duty-free. Kentucky doctor Daniel Drake proclaimed, "furnish us sturdy republicans with whiskey at so cheap a rate that the poorest man in the community can get drunk as often as his wealthiest neighbor – so that our boasted equality does not entirely rest on the basis of our political institutions."

=== Beer ===
In colonial America, beer was produced similarly to that of Britain as a dark and nutritious beer, suitable for the colder climate of New England but not for the south. A new style of lighter beer went into production in John Wagner's Philadelphia brewery in 1840. As settlers came to America from Germany, this German-type lager began to replace traditionally English-style beers in the United States.

Although a personalized beer culture took a foothold in the antebellum United States, American lager began to outsell whiskey only after the Civil War began and new taxes were placed on the spirit.

== Regional cuisines ==
Although different regions of the United States established their own specific cuisines, several aspects of Americans diets remained consistent across the continent. Pork and turkey were widely eaten and considered staples among Americans, and alcohol consumption dominated the beverages throughout the country.

=== Northeast ===
The Northeast of the antebellum United States had an abundant supply of fish and shellfish. New York especially was seen as a center for international foods, with imports in 1850 including Sicilian oranges, Cuban bananas, Chilean pumpkins, and Vietnamese hens.

=== Southeast ===
The American South distinguished itself from the rest of the antebellum United States largely due to the African and plantation influence on its cuisine, and "great plantations serving gargantuan meals were to be found in every state." Importance was placed on southern hospitality in meals, with Charles Murray commenting that "The people of the southern states are generally much more hospitable than northerners." African slaves' location in the American South had a lasting influence on Southern cuisine. Africans influenced dishes as gumbo, and food choices including okra, black-eyed peas, collards, yams, and melons, in the Southern United States, specifically Louisiana and South Carolina.

=== The West and frontier ===
Frontier conditions were varied in the Antebellum United States, greatly influencing the availability of foodstuffs. The frontier economy was based on hunting and foraging. Early settlers of the frontier depended highly on wild buffalo and black bears, relying on smoking jerky to preserve the meat. Frontiersmen, unlike the rest of the antebellum United States, had to rely more on water; however, they also drank tremendous amounts of whiskey, which was an accepted stimulant, anesthetic, disinfectant, and tranquilizer. An Anglican priest noted of frontiersmen that "they went out to revelling, drinking, singing, dancing, and whoring, and most of the Company were drunk before I quitted the spot."

There were almost no luxury goods in the interior lands of the south before 1835. Farms took time to get up and running. Corn was usually planted immediately as it was more forgiving than other food crops, but even corn had to be purchased for at least the first year of a new farm or plantation. Hogs were the most important domestic livestock and salt pork was, along with wild venison, the staple meat along the frontier, giving occasion for Harriet Martineau's complaint that travelers could find "little else than pork, under all manner of disguises". Eggs, milk and butter were sometimes available as some settlers kept cattle and chicken, but the most consistent staples were corn bread made with coarse meal, wild game and "rusty pork".

Most of the surviving first hand accounts describe the food unfavorably. James Creecy complained of eating nothing but salt pork and "musty corn meal dodgers" for weeks on end, stating "I have never fallen in with any cooking so villainous". Thomas Hamilton in 1803 recorded conditions on his trip between New Orleans and Charleston, "We were now beyond the region of bread, and our fare consisted of eggs, broiled venison, and cakes of Indian corn fried in some kind of oleaginous matter."

Many immigrants traveling west, such as those on the Oregon Trail, found themselves ill-prepared. Many suffered from bad water, exhaustion, and predators killing their livestock. Towns at the beginning of trails tended to cheat their customers by diluting their produce.

== Holidays and celebrations ==
=== Fourth of July ===
After the Revolutionary war, the Fourth of July was celebrated with picnics, fireworks, dances and dinners. Food was a big part of the day's events. The meals were important social gatherings and dinners were convened at coffeehouses, schools, private homes and taverns. The foods served varied, changing with the customs of each region, but in the North some common foods were chowder, beef, clam soup, baked beans, roasted pork, custards, oxen, turtles, mutton and salmon. The dinners had grown larger by the start of the 19th century, sometimes requiring tickets so those preparing the meals would know in advance how many mouths they would have to feed.

The Southern tradition centered on barbecues, not only of meats, but also fruits like peaches and watermelons, with ice cream for dessert. Slaves were sometimes able to partake of the festivities. Louis Hughes tells of pigs and sheep basted with butter and roasted in the ground, with apple dumplings and peach cobbler the favorites still "relished by all the slaves".

== Technological changes ==
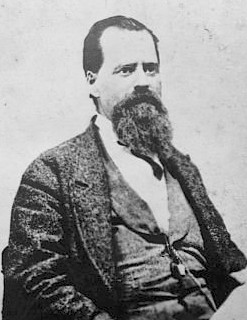
John Landis Mason

The pre-industrial way of cooking was one of the few cultural features that survived the Civil War, remaining mostly unchanged until around 1875. Most of the cooking was done over a hearth (open flame), or using a coal or wood burning stove, and nearly everything was done at home where cooks grew their own yeast to bake bread, and made gelatin by boiling pig's trotters, homemade ketchups (not only the tomato ketchup most common in modern times, but also other traditional varieties like mushroom ketchup), and preserves using fresh fruits.

Food was preserved by various methods in the era before refrigeration. The icebox, invented in 1802 by Thomas Moore, a Maryland farmer, significantly affected the way Americans saved food: perishables were now able to be stored more efficiently. By 1838 the New York Mirror noted, "it is but a few years since it came into use... [the icebox]... is now justly considered as much an article of necessity as a carpet or dining table."

Other technological advances in the antebellum period changed cuisine in the United States. Labor-saving devices were invented, such as the McCormick reaper (1834), the Pitts mechanical thresher (1837), and the Marsh harvester (1858), which helped the United States flood European cereal markets.

Additionally, in 1858, John Landis Mason invented the Mason jar as a new method of preserving fruits, vegetables, and jams in jars.

== Legacy ==
Although the antebellum era drew to a close with the start of the Civil War in 1861, American cuisine remained relatively consistent through the Gilded Age. Most soups of the era are still present in modern American cuisine, with the exception of Seminole soup (made with squirrel) and turtle soup. Some standard dishes continued to develop like macaroni a la cardinale, which became popular in the late 19th century and was completely unknown in the Antebellum era. There were other changes like adding béchamel sauce to the classic oyster patties, or serving beef à la mode as a cold dish rather than as an entrée, but according to food historians, the culinary aesthetics and customs from the first half of the century remained until the 1890s.

== See also ==
- Cuisine of the Thirteen Colonies
- Cuisine of the United States
- Early modern European cuisine
- List of American foods
