= Pone (food) =

Bread from American cuisine

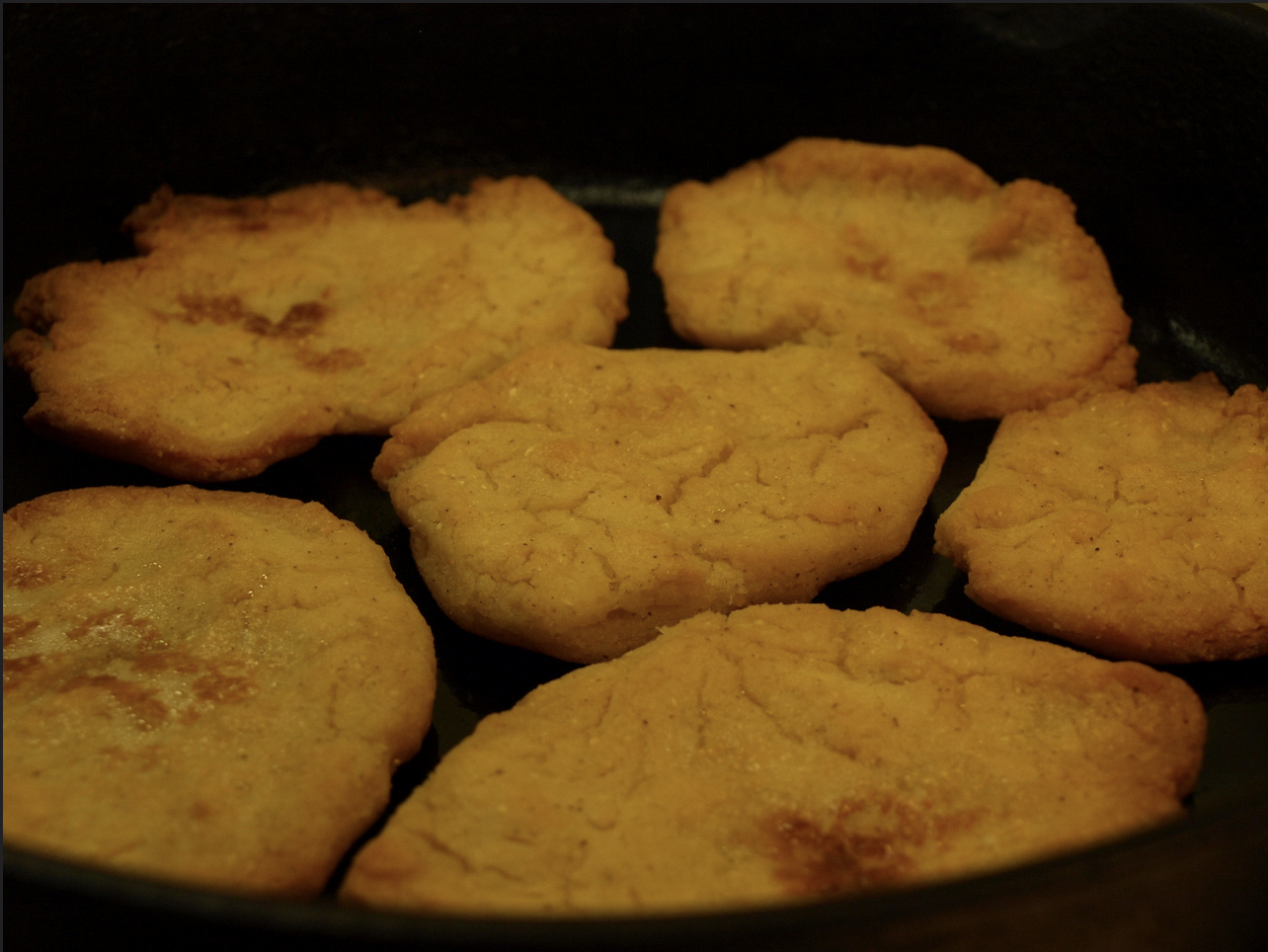
Fried corn pone

Pone is a type of baked or fried bread in American cuisine, and the Cuisine of the Southern United States. Pone could be made with corn, or some other main ingredient could be used like sweet potato. This style of bread, eaten cold as a breakfast food, was a staple food of the cuisine of the Thirteen Colonies.

== Terminology ==
The term "pone" most likely entered English from Algonquin language terms like apan, oppone or supawn, meaning baked, possibly related to earlier ash cakes baked in hot coals. A "corn pone" is usually a small round loaf of cornbread, about the size of a biscuit, traditionally baked in a round cast iron skillet.

The batter was also called "corn pone" and could be thin and fried on the griddle to make Johnny cakes or thicker to make baked loaves ("pone"), or dumplings, called corn dodgers when dropped in stews and hush puppies when deep fried. Hush puppies were called "fried pones" in the 1928 edition of Southern Cooking by Henrietta Stanley Dull, later changed to "hush puppy" for the 1941 edition.

Isabel Ely Lord uses the terms ash bread, johnny cake, spider cornbread, and hoe cake as synonyms for corn pone. Her explanation of the history of these different terms follows:

As "ash bread" it was baked in the hot ashes of the fireplace, protected by a cabbage leaf, or leaves; as "hoe cake" it baked on a hoe in the fields, or on a hoe-shaped board (with long handle) in the fireplace. "Pone" is the irregular oval shape the cakes took in these last 2 methods when shaped by the palm of the hand. "Johnny cake" was a Northern name, and the cake was usually baked in the oven.

== Variations ==
There are varieties on the basic corn pone recipe like apple pones, pumpkin pones and sweet potato pone. The batter can be enriched with sweeteners like sugar or molasses to improve the flavor, and spices like cinnamon, cloves, ginger or grated orange peel, but some cooks consider the addition of sugar a deviation from "the original dish". When milk is used in place of water it becomes corn cake.

There are hundreds of variations of sweet potato pone in historical cookbooks with rose water, orange blossom water as a dessert, or served as a side dish for pork or wild game. Creole variations typically add black pepper.
