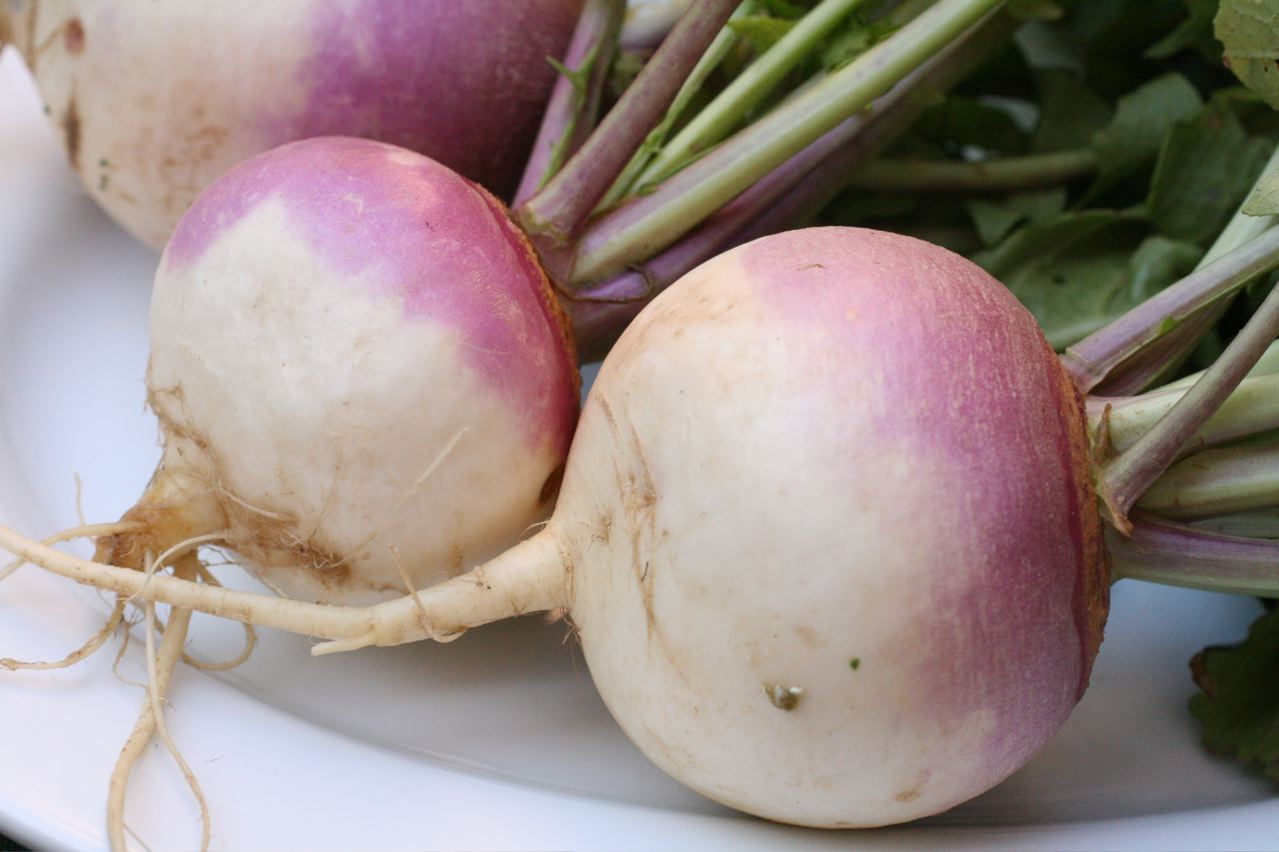
- Turnip roots

Scientific classification
- Kingdom: Plantae
- Clade: Tracheophytes
- Clade: Angiosperms
- Clade: Eudicots
- Clade: Rosids
- Order: Brassicales
- Family: Brassicaceae
- Genus: Brassica
- Species: B. rapa
- Variety: B. r. var. rapa

Trinomial name
- Brassica rapa var. rapa L.

= Turnip =

Type of root vegetable

The turnip or white turnip (Brassica rapa subsp. rapa) is a root vegetable commonly grown in temperate climates worldwide for its white, fleshy taproot. Small, tender varieties are grown for human consumption, while larger varieties are grown as feed for livestock. The name turnip – used in many regions – may also be used to refer to swede (or neep or rutabaga), which is a different but related vegetable.

== Etymology ==
The origin of the word turnip is uncertain. It may be a compound of turn as in turned/rounded on a lathe and neep, derived from Latin napus, the word for the plant. According to An Universal Etymological English Dictionary (1721), turn refers to "round napus to distinguish it from the napi, which were generally long".

== Description ==
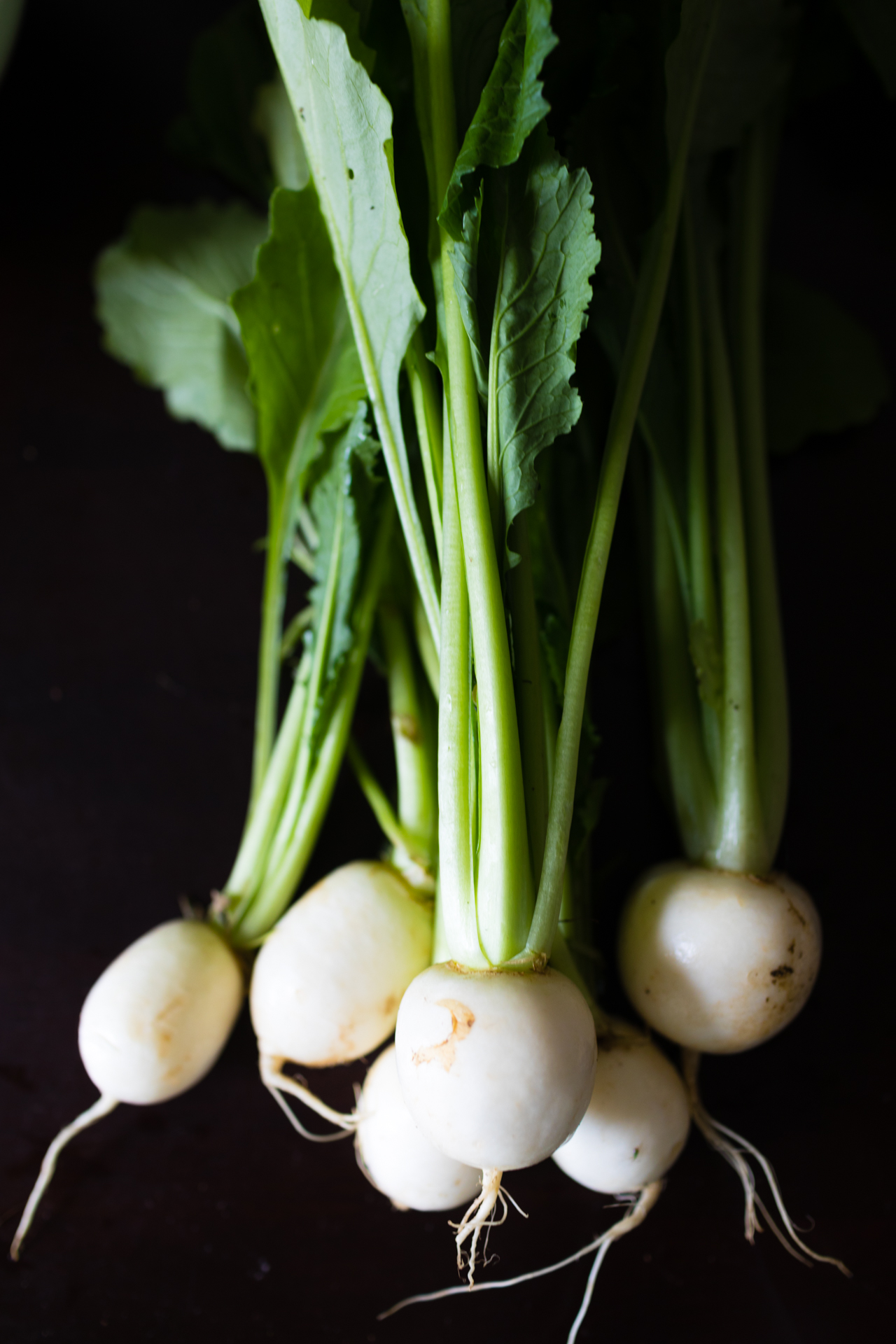
A bunch of Hakurei turnips

The most common type of turnip is white-skinned except for the upper part that protrudes above the ground. This part may be purple, red or greenish where exposed to sunlight. Inside it is white. The root is roughly globular, from 5–20 cm (2–8 in) in diameter, and lacks side roots. Underneath, the taproot (the normal root below the swollen storage root) is thin and 10 cm (4 in) or more in length; it is often trimmed off before selling. The leaves grow directly from the above-ground shoulder of the root, with little or no visible crown or neck (as found in rutabagas).

Turnip roots weigh up to 1 kilogram (2 pounds), although they are usually harvested when smaller. Size is partly a function of variety and partly a function of the length of time a turnip has grown.

== History ==
Wild forms of the turnip and its relatives, the mustards and radishes, are found over western Asia and Europe. Starting as early as 2000 BCE, related oilseed subspecies of Brassica rapa like oleifera may have been domesticated several times from the Mediterranean, to North east China and, North West Indian subcontinent, though these are not the same turnips cultivated for their roots. It is believed oilseed subspecies domestication came after turnip roots. Previous estimates of domestication dates are limited to linguistic analyses of plant names.

Edible turnips were domesticated in Central Asia several thousand years ago, supported by genetic studies of both wild and domesticated varieties showing Central Asian varieties are the most genetically diverse crops. Ancient literary references to turnips in Central Asia, and the existence of words for 'turnip' in ancestral languages of the region, also support the turnip as the original domesticated form of Brassica rapa subsp. rapa. It later spread to Europe and East Asia with farmers in both areas later selecting for larger leaves; it subsequently became an important food in the Hellenistic and Roman world. Although the date of turnips' spread to South and West Asia is unclear, genetic evidence implies it occurred after their initial spread to Europe and East Asia.Among Jews in antiquity, the turnip was regarded as a food of the poor, to the extent that the Talmud declares, "Woe to the house in which the turnip passes". Rabbinic sources further observe that turnips were consumed in various forms, "fresh, boiled, or ground", and that their flavor was enhanced when cooked with meat. The turnip later spread to China, and reached Japan by 700 CE.

Turnips were an important crop in the cuisine of Antebellum America. They were grown for their greens as well as the roots, and could yield edible greens within a few weeks of planting, making them a staple of new plantations still in the process of becoming productive. They could be planted as late as the fall and still provide newly arrived settlers with a source of food. The typical southern way of cooking turnip greens was to boil them with a chunk of salt pork. The broth obtained from this process was known as pot likker and was served with crumbled corn pone, often made from coarse meal when little else was available along the antebellum frontier.

== Cultivation ==
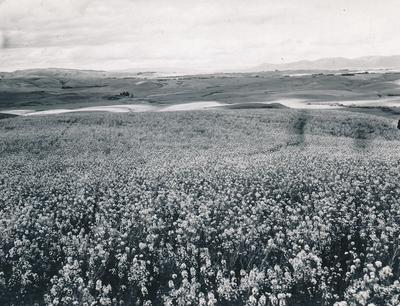
Turnip crop in flower, c. 1930

The 1881 American Household Cyclopedia advises that turnips can be grown in fields that have been harrowed and ploughed. It recommends planting in late May or June and weeding and thinning with a hoe throughout the summer.

As a root crop, turnips grow best in cool weather; hot temperatures cause the roots to become woody and bitter. They are typically planted in the spring in cold-weather climates (such as the northern US and Canada) where the growing season is only 3–4 months. As the global climate warms, this can increase the growing season but can also stress turnips; recent work has shown that agrivoltaic shielding with partially-transparent solar panels can mitigate this effect and increase yields. In temperate climates (ones with a growing season of 5–6 months), turnips may also be planted in late summer for a second fall crop. In warm-weather climates (7 or more month growing season), they are planted in the fall. The average time from planting to harvest is 55–60 days. Turnips can also be grown in controlled-environmental agriculture using vertical farming techniques, although larger grow cups are needed than those traditionally used for crops like lettuce.

Turnips are a biennial plant, taking two years from germination to reproduction. The root spends the first year growing and storing nutrients, and the second year flowers, produces seeds, and dies. The flowers of the turnip are tall and yellow, with the seeds forming in pea-like pods. In areas with less than seven-month growing seasons, temperatures are too cold for the roots to survive the winter. To produce seeds, pulling the turnips and storing them over winter is necessary, taking care not to damage the leaves. During the spring, they may be set back in the ground to complete their lifecycle.

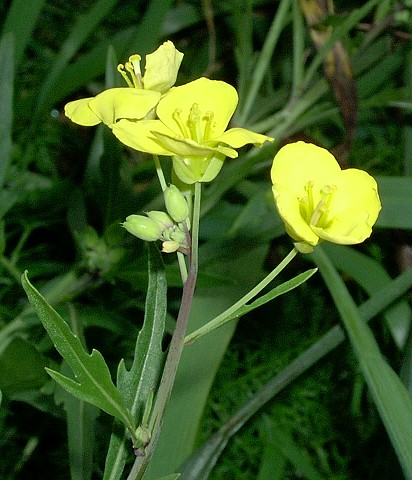
Turnip flowers

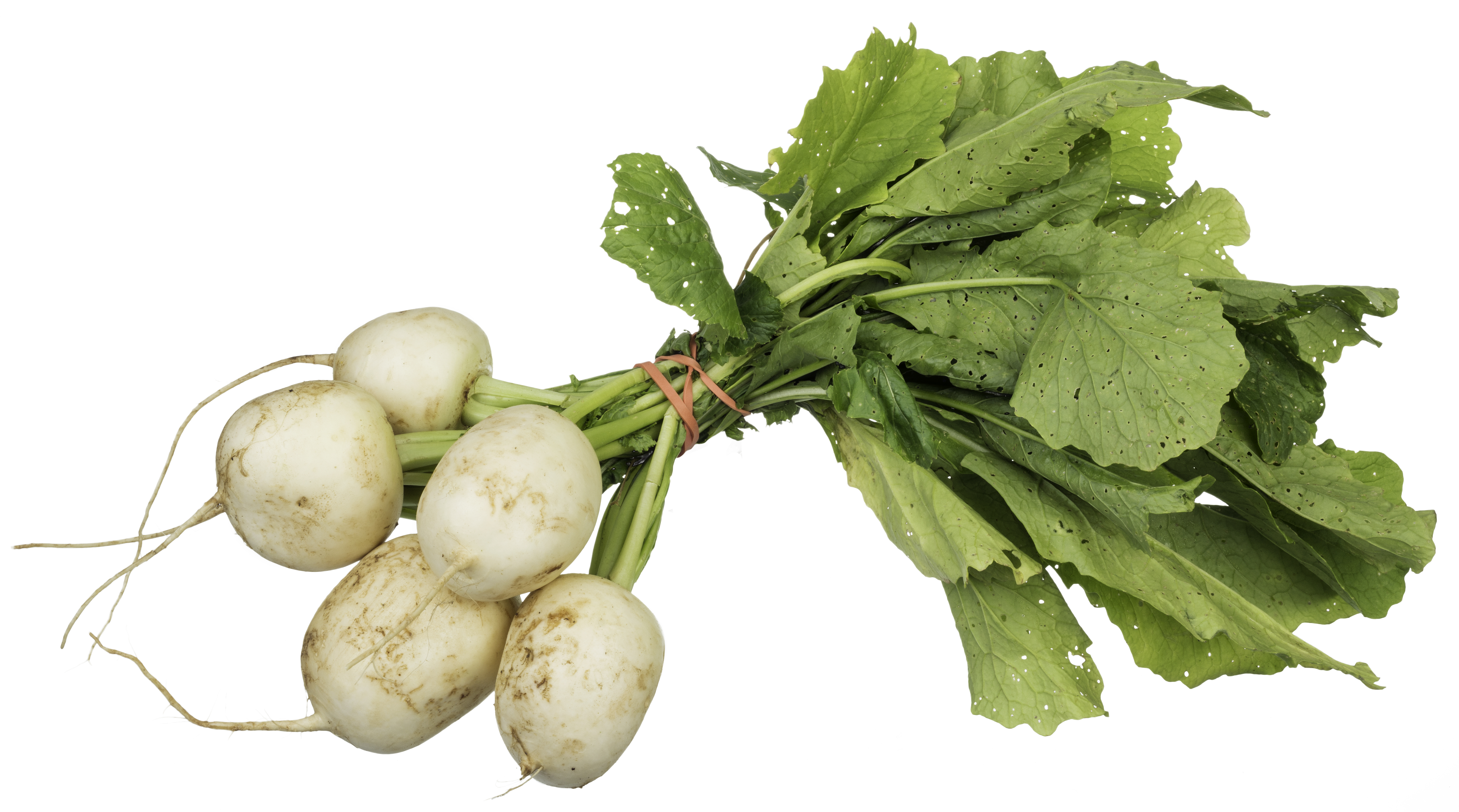
A bundle of Tokyo turnips

Production of carrots and turnips

Carrot and turnip yield

== Nutrition ==
Turnip greens, cooked, boiled, drained, without salt
Nutritional value per 100 g (3.5 oz)
- Energy: 84 kJ (20 kcal)
- Carbohydrates: 4.4 g
- Sugars: 0.5 g
- Dietary fiber: 3.5 g
- Fat: 0.2 g
- Protein: 1.1 g
Vitamins and minerals
Vitamins	Quantity %DV^{†}
Vitamin A equiv. beta-Carotene	42% 381 μg 42% 4575 μg
Thiamine (B1)	4% 0.045 mg
Riboflavin (B2)	6% 0.072 mg
Niacin (B3)	3% 0.411 mg
Pantothenic acid (B5)	5% 0.274 mg
Vitamin B6	11% 0.18 mg
Folate (B9)	30% 118 μg
Vitamin C	30% 27.4 mg
Vitamin E	13% 1.88 mg
Vitamin K	307% 368 μg
Minerals	Quantity %DV^{†}
Calcium	11% 137 mg
Iron	4% 0.8 mg
Magnesium	5% 22 mg
Manganese	15% 0.337 mg
Phosphorus	2% 29 mg
Potassium	7% 203 mg
Sodium	1% 29 mg
- Other constituents: Quantity
- Water: 93.2 g
- Lutein: 8440 µg
- Link to USDA Database entry
- ^{†}Percentages estimated using US recommendations for adults, except for potassium, which is estimated based on expert recommendation from the National Academies.

Turnips, cooked, boiled, drained, without salt
Nutritional value per 100 g (3.5 oz)
- Energy: 92 kJ (22 kcal)
- Carbohydrates: 5.1 g
- Sugars: 3.0
- Dietary fiber: 2.0 g
- Fat: 0.1 g
- Protein: 0.7 g
Vitamins and minerals
Vitamins	Quantity %DV^{†}
Thiamine (B1)	2%.027 mg
Riboflavin (B2)	2%.023 mg
Niacin (B3)	2%.299 mg
Pantothenic acid (B5)	3%.142 mg
Vitamin B6	4%.067 mg
Folate (B9)	2% 9 μg
Vitamin C	13% 11.6 mg
Minerals	Quantity %DV^{†}
Calcium	3% 33 mg
Iron	1%.18 mg
Magnesium	2% 9 mg
Manganese	3%.071 mg
Phosphorus	2% 26 mg
Potassium	6% 177 mg
Sodium	1% 16 mg
Zinc	1%.12 mg
- Other constituents: Quantity
- Water: 93.6 g
- Link to USDA Database entry
- ^{†}Percentages estimated using US recommendations for adults, except for potassium, which is estimated based on expert recommendation from the National Academies.

Boiled green leaves of the turnip top ("turnip greens") provide 84 kilojoules (20 kilocalories) of food energy in a reference serving of 100 grams (3 1/2 oz), and are 93% water, 4% carbohydrates, and 1% protein, with negligible fat. The boiled greens are a rich source (more than 20% of the Daily Value, DV) particularly of vitamin K (350% DV), with vitamin A, vitamin C, and folate content also significant (30% DV or greater). Additionally, boiled turnip greens contain substantial lutein (8440 micrograms per 100 g).

In a 100-gram reference amount, boiled turnip root supplies 92 kJ (22 kcal), with only vitamin C in a moderate amount (14% DV). Other micronutrients in boiled turnip are in low or negligible content. Boiled turnip is 94% water, 5% carbohydrates, and 1% protein, with negligible fat.

== Uses ==
Turnip leaves are sometimes eaten as "turnip greens" ("turnip tops" in the UK), with a flavor resembling mustard greens (to which they are closely related). Turnip greens are a common side dish in southeastern US cooking, primarily during late fall and winter. Smaller leaves are preferred. Varieties of turnip grown specifically for their leaves resemble mustard greens and have small roots. These include rapini (broccoli rabe), bok choy, and Chinese cabbage. Similar to raw cabbage or radish, turnip leaves and roots have a pungent flavor that becomes milder after cooking.

In England around 1700, Charles "Turnip" Townshend promoted the use of turnips in a four-year crop-rotation system that enabled year-round livestock feeding.

In the Austrian region of Wildschönau, farmers produce a kind of schnaps called Krautinger from a variation of Brassica rapa subsp. rapa, since they were granted permission to do so under Empress Maria Theresia in the 18th century. It is notorious for its distinct taste and smell.

== In culture ==
The turnip is an old vegetable charge in heraldry. It was used by Leonhard von Keutschach, prince-archbishop of Salzburg. The turnip is still the heart shield in the arms of Keutschach am See.

The arms of the former municipality of Kiikala, Finland, were Gules, a turnip Or.

In Scottish and some other English dialects, the word turnip can also refer to rutabagas (North American English), also known as swedes in England, a variety of Brassica napus, which is a hybrid between the turnip, Brassica rapa, and the cabbage. Turnips are generally smaller with white flesh, while rutabagas are larger with yellow flesh. Scottish English sometimes distinguishes turnips as white turnips, and sometimes distinguishes rutabagas as neeps.

Turnips in the coat of arms of Kauvatsa
