= Early modern European cuisine =

Cuisine of early modern Europe (c. 1500–1800)

Still life with a peacock pie, 1627, by Dutch artist Pieter Claesz, showing various dishes from the 17th century including roast meat, breads, nuts, wine, apples, dried fruits, along with an elaborate meat pie decorated like a peacock. While common in the warmer climates of Southern Europe, lemons would have been a relatively new introduction to the Netherlands, requiring growing in a orangery.

The cuisine of early modern Europe (c. 1500–1800) was a mix of dishes inherited from medieval cuisine combined with innovations that would persist in the modern era.

The discovery of the New World, the establishment of new trade routes with Asia and increased foreign influences from sub-Saharan Africa and the Middle East meant that Europeans became familiarized with a multitude of new foodstuffs. Spices that previously had been prohibitively expensive luxuries, such as pepper, cinnamon, cloves, nutmeg, and ginger, soon became available to the majority population, and the introduction of new plants coming from the New World and India like maize, potato, sweet potato, chili pepper, cocoa, vanilla, tomato, coffee, and tea transformed European cuisine forever.

Though there was a great influx of new ideas, an increase in foreign trade and a Scientific Revolution, preservation of foods remained traditional: preserved by drying, salting, and smoking or pickling in vinegar. Fare was naturally dependent on the season: a cookbook by Domenico Romoli called "Panunto" made a virtue of necessity by including a recipe for each day of the year. Everywhere both doctors and chefs continued to characterize foodstuffs by their effects on the four humours: they were considered to be heating or cooling to the constitution, moistening or drying.

There was a very great increase in prosperity in Europe during this period, which gradually reached all classes and all areas, and considerably changed the patterns of eating. Nationalism was first conceived in the early modern period, but it was not until the 19th century that the notion of a national cuisine emerged. Class differences were far more important dividing lines, and it was almost always upper-class food that was described in recipe collections and cookbooks.

== Background ==
"Spices begin to pour into Europe," explains Krishnendu Ray, an associate professor of food studies at New York University. "What used to be expensive and exclusive became common."

Serving richly spiced stews was no longer a status symbol for Europe's wealthiest families — even the middle classes could afford to spice up their grub. "So the elite recoiled from the increasing popularity of spices," Ray says. "They moved on to an aesthetic theory of taste. Rather than infusing food with spice, they said things should taste like themselves. Meat should taste like meat, and anything you add only serves to intensify the existing flavors."

The culinary fashion of European elites changed considerably in this period. Typically medieval spices like galangal and grains of paradise were no longer seen in recipes. Updated recipes still had the strong acidic flavors of earlier centuries, but by the 1650s new innovative recipes blending subtle savory flavors like herbs and mushrooms could be found in Parisian cookbooks.

== Meals ==
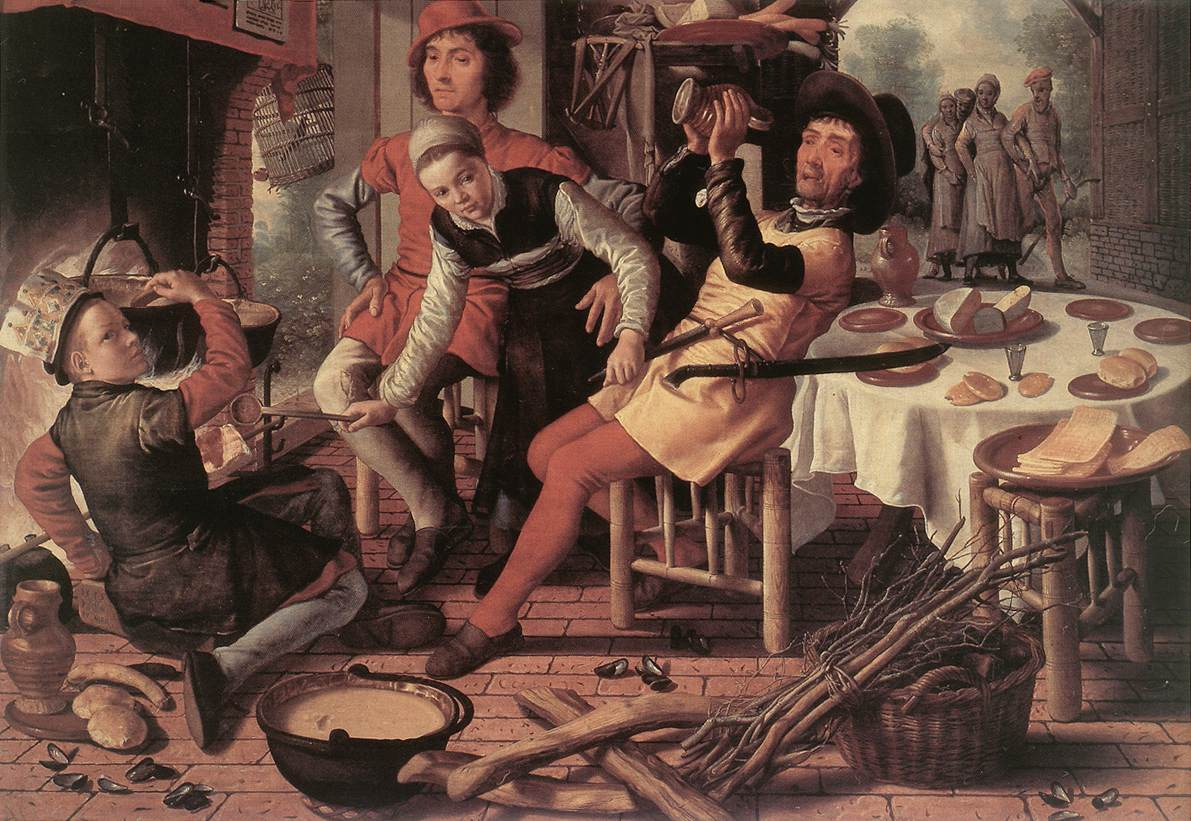
Peasants by the Hearth, 1560, by Pieter Aertsen

The three-meal-regimen so common today did not become a standard until well into the modern era.

In most parts of Europe, two meals per day were eaten, one in the early morning to noon and one in the late afternoon or later at night. The exact times varied both by period and region. In Spain and in parts of Italy such as Genoa and Venice the early meal was the lighter one while supper was heavier. In the rest of Europe, the first meal of the day was the more substantial. Throughout the period, there was a gradual shift in mealtimes. The shift was mainly influenced by cultural norms. Still, to the circumstances of an earlier age: people got up earlier in the agricultural society without electrical lighting. Since most people were working in the fields they needed a lot of energy throughout the day, which meant that they needed to eat a large meal in the middle of the day to keep their energy up. The first meal, then called dinner in English, moved from before noon to around 2:00 or 3:00 in the afternoon by the 17th century. The word supper came from the French but it is also slightly related to the Scandinavian and German words for soup, suppe, and suppa. These dinner times began to change for the European upper class especially when there were wars in the 1600s and power was strengthened through kings and other sorts of government. These people in power noticed that since they could very easily afford entertainment and the new expensive lights for their time this would allow them to party way longer than ever before. Therefore, pushed their dinner times to a few hours. In the middle of the 18th century, it could be held as late as 5:00 or 6:00. This necessitated a midday meal, luncheon, later shortened to lunch, which was established by the late century. Lunch became a standard for everyday life at the end of the 18th century. The word luncheon directly means a light repast between mealtimes which now relates to the modern English “tea” times. Now this is a light snack between lunch and dinner but in the early modern times, it was lunch that was a light snack between breakfast and dinner. It was only in the nineteenth century that the full three meals a day became quite popular. This was mostly popular among the more wealthy but it did gain some popularity in the less wealthy as well.

Breakfast does not receive much attention in any sources. As in the Middle Ages, breakfast in the sense of an early morning meal, is largely absent from the sources. It's unclear if this meant it was universally avoided or that it simply was not fashionable enough to be mentioned, as most sources were written by, for, and about the upper class. There is no doubt that working people since medieval times ate some sort of morning meal, but it is unclear exactly at what time and what it consisted of. Peasants in the early modern world commonly ate a diet that consisted of "gruels, pottages, and ... grains". Breakfast, when it began to be fashionable, was usually just a coffee, tea or chocolate, and did not become a more substantial meal in many parts of Europe until the 19th century. In the south, where supper was the largest meal, there was less need for breakfast, and it therefore remained unimportant, something that can still be seen today in the traditionally light breakfasts of southern Europe, which usually consists of coffee or tea with bread or pastry.

== Foods ==
=== Cereals ===
The Harvesters by Pieter Bruegel the Elder; Antwerp, 1565.

For most of Europe, the many varieties of grain were the most important crop and formed the daily staple for segments of society. The differentiation was in the varieties, its quality and how it was prepared. The lower classes ate bread that was coarse and of considerably higher bran content while the upper classes enjoyed the finely ground, white wheat flour that most modern Europeans are used to. Wheat was considerably more expensive than other grains, and rarely eaten by many. Most bread was made with a mixture of wheat and other grains.

Grain remained the undisputed main staple of early modern Europe until the 17th century. By this time the skepticism towards New World imports such as potatoes and maize had softened among the general populace, and the potato in particular found new appreciation in northern Europe, where it was a much more productive and flexible crop than wheat. In Ireland, this would later have disastrous results. In the early 19th century, when much of the country depended almost exclusively on potato, the potato blight, a fungus that rotted the edible tubers of the potato plant while still in the ground, caused a massive famine that killed over a million people and forced another two million to emigrate. In regions of Europe such as Scotland, Scandinavia, and northern Russia, the climate and soil types were less suited for wheat cultivation, and rye and barley were far more important. Rye was used to bake the dense, dark bread that is still common in countries like Sweden, Russia, and Finland. Barley was more common in the north, and was often used to make beer.

Oats made up a considerable minority of the produced grain but stood very low in status and was commonly used as animal feed, especially for horses. Millet, grown in much of Europe since prehistoric times was still used throughout much of the early period, but had largely disappeared by the 18th century although its exceptional storage period of up to twenty years meant it was used for emergency reserves. For example, the Italian dish polenta, previously made from millet, later was made with maize. Pasta had been a common food since the middle of the medieval period, and gained in popularity during the early modern period (notably in Naples, where it was not often seen until the late 18th century), but it was not yet usual to use the hard variety of durum wheat or semolina to make dried pasta until the Industrial era. Rice became established in many places, especially Italy and Spain, during the period, but was regarded as a low-status food; the well-off might occasionally have rice pudding but otherwise ignored it.

Peas and beans, which made up a very large part of the diet of the medieval poor, were still often treated as a staple food, but to a diminishing extent over the period, to be replaced by cereals and the potato.

=== Meats ===
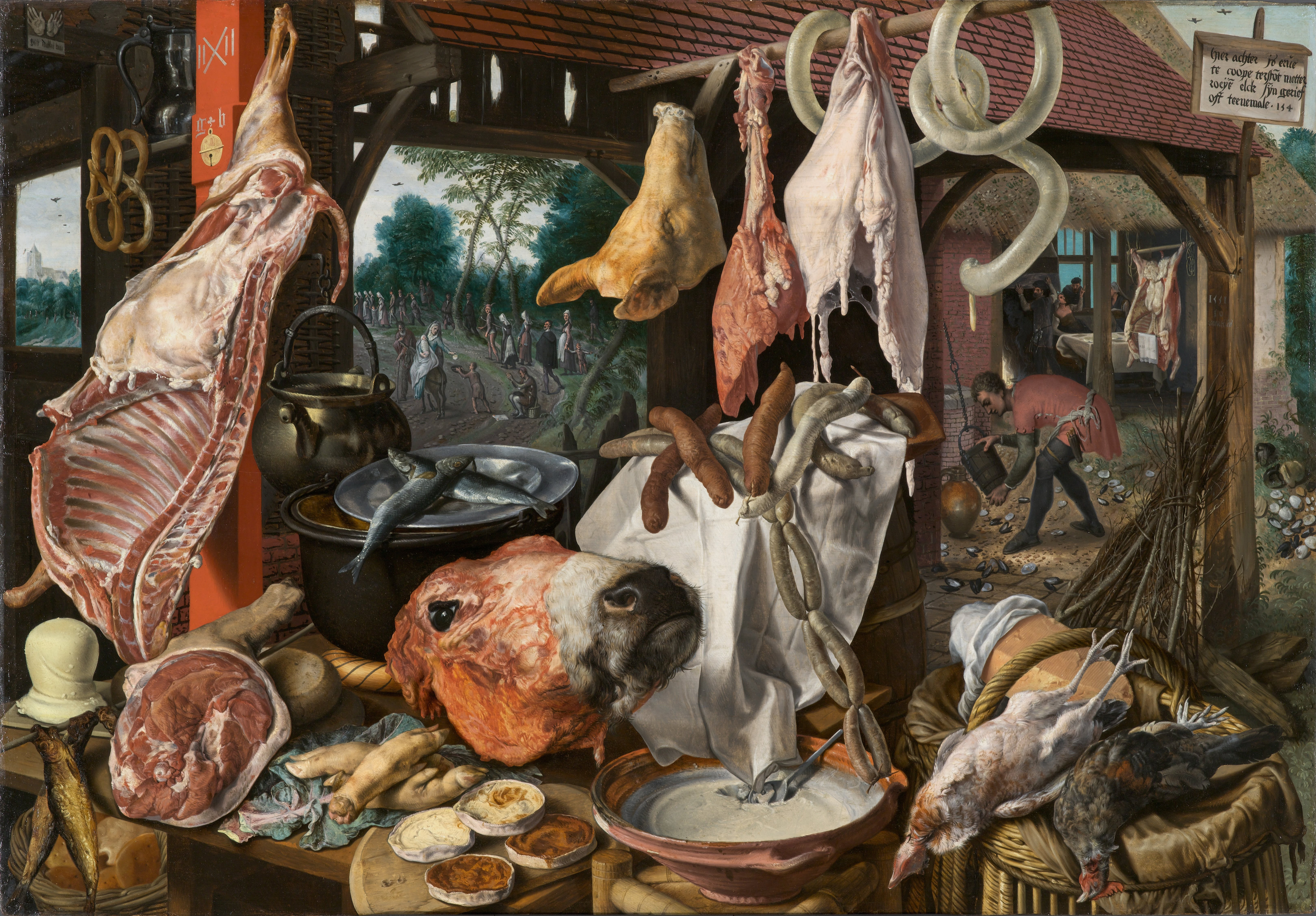
A Meat Stall with the Holy Family Giving Alms, 1551, by Pieter Aertsen, showing various meat ingredients of the 16th century.

European consumption of meat remained exceptional by world standards, and during the period high levels generally moved down the social scale. But the poor continued to rely mainly on eggs, dairy products, and pulses for protein, though wild game and fish were caught and eaten in less populated regions. The richer nations, especially England, ate considerably more meat than the poorer ones. In some areas, especially Germany and the Mediterranean counties, the meat consumption of ordinary people actually declined, beginning in about 1550, and continuing throughout the period. Increasing population seem to lie behind this trend.

=== Fruits and vegetables ===
Fruits and vegetables that were introduced to Europe during this time include the tomato, chili pepper, and pumpkin (from the Americas) and the artichoke (from the Mediterranean). Additionally, while wild strawberry had existed, the modern garden strawberry was domesticated in France in the late 18th century from varieties found in the Americas.

The innovation and popularization of the orangery, an early form of greenhouse, in the 17th century enabled the growing or wintering of fruiting plants that would otherwise be unable to survive the climate of more northerly locations in Europe. This enabled the wealthy to have access to fresh oranges, lemons, limes, and even pineapples prior to the advent of refrigerated transport.

=== Fats ===
A map of Early Modern Europe could be drawn based on the characteristic fats that predominated: olive oil, butter and lard. These kitchen staples had not changed since Roman times, but the onset of the Little Ice Age that coincided with Early Modern Europe affected the northernmost regions where olives would flourish. Only olive oil was a subject of long-distance trade.

=== Sugar ===
Cane sugar, native to India, was already known in Europe in the Middle Ages, expensive and mainly regarded as a medicine. From the end of the 17th century, greatly increased New World production struggled to meet the increase in European demand, so that by the end of the period the maritime nations of England, France, the Low and Iberian Countries were consuming large quantities, but other parts of Europe used it far less. At the same time, modern distinctions between sweet and savoury dishes were becoming general; meat dishes were much less likely to be sweetened than in the Middle Ages.

== Drink ==
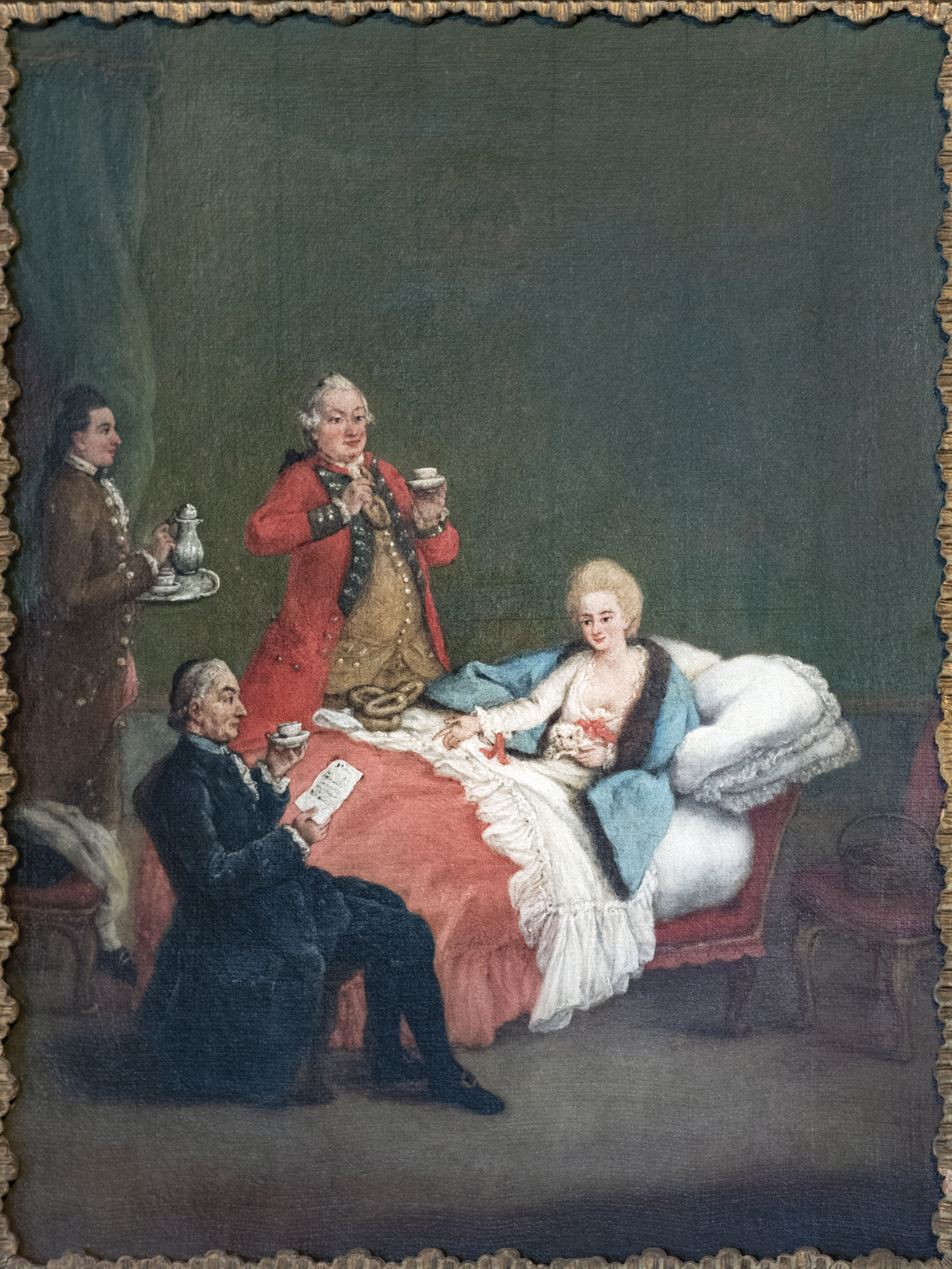
The morning chocolate by Pietro Longhi; Venice, 1775–1780.

Water as a neutral table beverage did not appear in Europe until well into the Industrial era, when efficient water purification could ensure safe drinking water. All but the poorest drank mildly alcoholic drinks on a daily basis, for every meal; wine in the south, beer in the north, east, and middle Europe. Both drinks came in many varieties, vintages, and at varying qualities. Those northerners who could afford to do so drank imported wines, and wine remained an integral part of the Eucharist, even for the poor. Ale had been the most common form of beer in England through most of the Middle Ages, but was mostly replaced with hopped beer from the Low Countries in the 16th century.

=== Wine ===
Shifting trade patterns and political events resulted in the growth of new regional wine industries and winemaking traditions. It saw the rise of sparkling Champagne, Madeira wine, Sack, and fortified Port wine. In England, repeated wars with France resulted in regular disruptions of trade and thus difficulties importing French wines. Following the Methuen Treaty of 1703 between England and Portugal, which favorably taxed Portuguese wines, England became increasingly reliant instead on Portuguese imports.

=== Spirits ===
The art of distillation was perfected in Europe during the 15th century, and many of today's most common and familiar spirits were invented and perfected before the 18th century.

Brandy (from Low German Brandwein via Dutch brandewijn, meaning "distilled wine") first appeared in 15th-century Germany. When the English and Dutch were in fierce competition for the control of the lucrative European export market, the Dutch encouraged wine growing outside the Bordeaux area, where the English had strong connections. The result that the regions of Cognac and Armagnac became famous for producing high-quality brandy. Whisky and schnapps were produced in small household stills. Whisky became fashionable, commercialised, and exported in the 19th century. Gin, grain liquor flavored with juniper, was invented by the Dutch and commercial production by Lucas Bols began in the mid-17th century. The production was later refined in England and became immensely popular among the English working classes, ultimately resulting in the Gin Craze of the early 18th century.

In the triangular trade which began in the 16th and 17th century between Europe, North America and the Caribbean, rum was one of the most important commodities. It was made from molasses and was one of the most important products made from the sugar grown on the Caribbean Islands and in Brazil. In Britain, punch developed as a result of various influences, and was popularized during this time.

=== Coffee, tea and chocolate ===
Before the Early modern period, the social drinks of Europe had all been alcoholic. With the increased contact with Asia and Africa and the discovery of the Americas meant that Europeans came into contact with tea, coffee, and drinking chocolate. But it was not until the 17th century that all three products became popular as social beverages. The new drinks contained caffeine or theobromine, both mild stimulants that are not intoxicating in the same way as alcohol. Chocolate was the first drink to gain popularity, and was one of the preferred drinks of the Spanish nobility in the 16th and early 17th century. All three remained very expensive throughout the early modern period.

== National cuisines ==
As nations began to form in Europe, the foundations of cuisine had begun to form. Although nationalization of many of today's European nations had not occurred in early modern Europe, many of the characteristics that establish a national cuisine began to emerge. These attributes included attributes such as the emergence of professional chefs, professional kitchens, the printing of codified culinary texts, and educated diners.

=== Italy ===
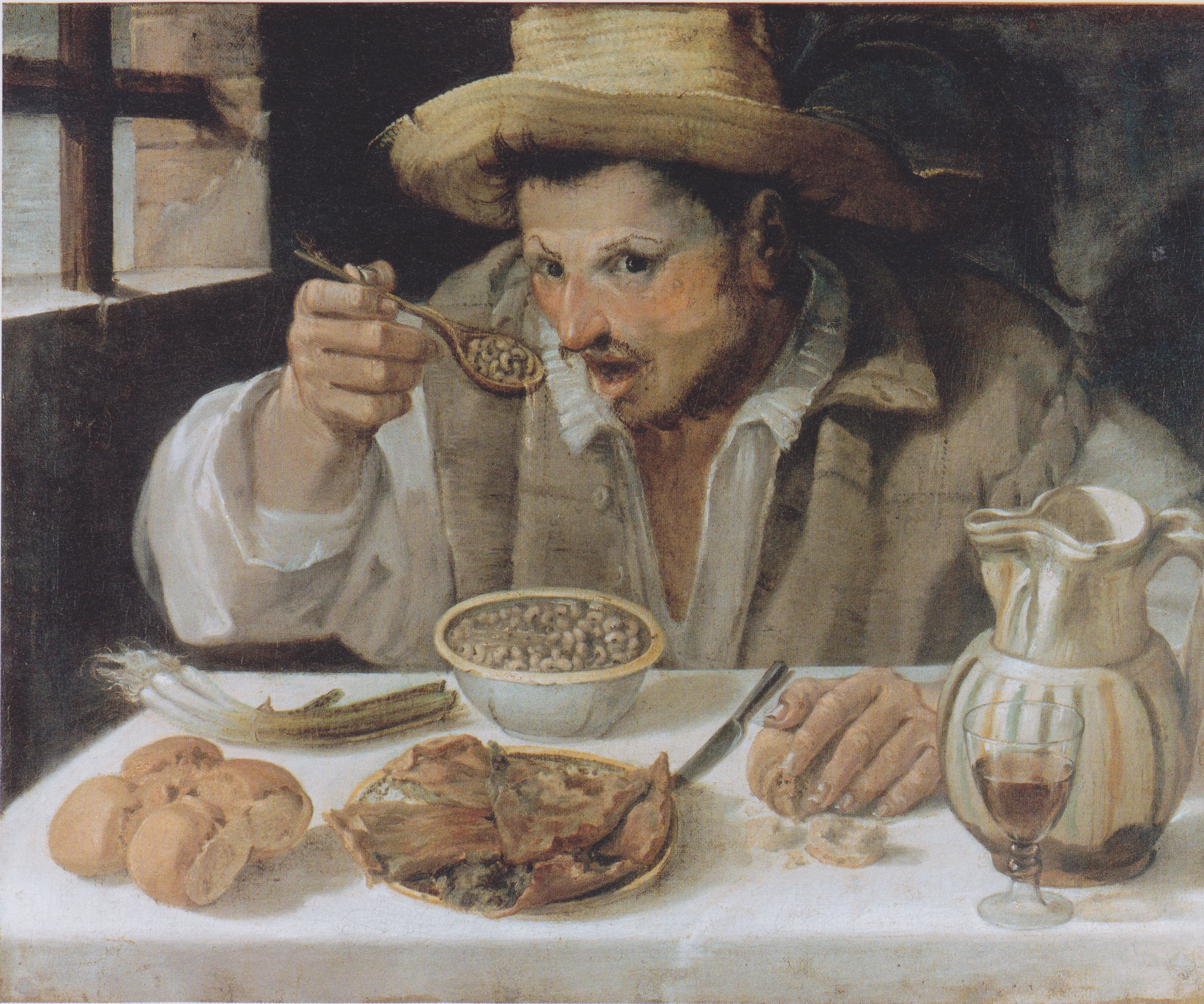
Beans were among the most important staples for the early modern Tuscans; The Beaneater by Annibale Carracci, 1580–90.

In Italy, a didactic switch occurred during the early modern era which changed the cuisine from one of high court cuisine, to a regional local cuisine by the end of the era. In the beginning of the era the courts of Florence, Rome, Venice, and Ferrara were an integral component to the creation of fine cooking in Italy with the court of Estes in Ferrara a central figure to the creation of this high-cuisine. A number of chefs were integral to this process, including Cristoforo di Messisbugo, steward to Ippolito d'Este, published Banchetti Composizioni di Vivande in 1549, which detailed banquets in the first half of the book, while the second half of the book featured a multitude of recipes for items such as pies and tarts (containing 124 recipes with various fillings).

In 1570, Opera dell'arte del cucinare was written by Bartolomeo Scappi, personal chef to Pope Pius V, a five-volume work which to that date encompassed the most comprehensive example of Italian cooking. The work contained over 1,000 recipes, with information on banquets including displays and menus as well as illustrations of kitchen and table utensils. Opera was an important text as it is seen as one of the first integral works which shed game meats in favor of domesticated animals. Additionally "alternative" cuts of animals such as tongue, head, and shoulder appear in recipes. Seasonality to fish and seafood dishes was also featured along with emphasis on Lenten cookery. Opera also featured an early version of the Neapolitan pizza, however, it was a sweet concoction unlike today's savory dish. Turkey and maize also appear for a first time in Italy in this book.

Unlike France's continued path toward high-cuisine, Italy began to show a change toward regionalism and simple cooking in the late 17th century. In 1662 the last cookbook on Italian high-cuisine was published by Bartolomeo Stefani chef to Gonzagas. L'Arte di Ben Cucinare introduced vitto ordinario ("ordinary food") to Italian cookery. In turn, at the beginning of the 18th century, the cookery books of Italy began to show the regionalism of Italian cuisine in order for Italian chefs to better show the pride of their regions instead of the high cuisine of France. These books were no longer addressed to professional chefs but to bourgeois housewives who could address their home cook. Originating in booklet form, periodicals such as La cuoca cremonese (The cook of Cremona) written in 1794 give a sequence of ingredients according to season along with chapters on meat, fish, and vegetables. As the century progressed these books increased in size, popularity, and frequency, while the price to attain them dropped well within the reach of the general populace.

=== France ===
In France, shift came from the specialization of culinary skills by-way-of guilds. The two major separations of guilds were between those who supplied raw products and those who prepared them. Guilds specialized in specific forms of cookery included bakers, pastrycooks, saucemakers, poulterers, and caterers. It was through this specialization that many of the well-known French dishes of today began to take hold, but it was not until the 17th century that France's haute cuisine would begin codification with La Varenne the author of works such as Cvisinier françois and Le Parfait confitvrier, he is credited with publishing the first true French cookbook. His recipes marked a change from the style of cookery known in the Middle Ages, to new techniques aimed at creating somewhat lighter dishes, and more modest presentations of pies as individual pastries and turnovers.

During the 15th and 16th centuries, French cuisine assimilated many new food items from the New World. Although they were slow to be adopted, records of banquets show Catherine de' Medici serving sixty-six turkeys at one dinner. The dish called cassoulet has its roots in the New World discovery of haricot beans, which are central to the dish's creation but had not existed outside of the New World until its exploration by Christopher Columbus.

It was during this era that coulis and roux first became part of the standard repertoire of French cooking techniques.

== Legacy ==
The end of the 18th century (and with it the Early Modern era) saw and coincided with several major advancements that would change European foodways as it entered the modern industrial era. First was the introduction of the first modern public restaurant in Paris in the 1780s. Following the French Revolution, the dissolution of the Ancien Régime led the former cooks for the aristocracy to turn to new clients, either elsewhere in Europe or with the general public in France, accelerating the growth of restaurant culture. Second, around 1800, Count Rumford developed early designs for a new form of efficient kitchen stove, distinct from the traditional simple kitchen fireplace; which later in the 19th century would be mass-produced in cast-iron and become the new center of the kitchen and cooking.

Through the influence of colonization and emigration, early modern European cuisine would be foundational to the cuisines of the early United States and Canada, and play a significant role in the foodways of Mexico, Central America, South America, and the West Indies. At the same time, the influence of indigenous ingredients and foodways more suited to the local environment, together with the impact of foodways brought by enslaved Africans, and growing national identities as a result of the decolonization of the Americas from the 1780s to the 1830s would lead to culinary traditions that diverged from their respective European roots, and from subsequent developments there.

== See also ==
- Tudor food and drink
- Category:Early modern cookbooks
