= List of foods of the Southern United States =

This is a list of notable foods that are popular in the Southern United States. The cuisine of the Southern United States has many various dishes and foods.

== Beverages ==
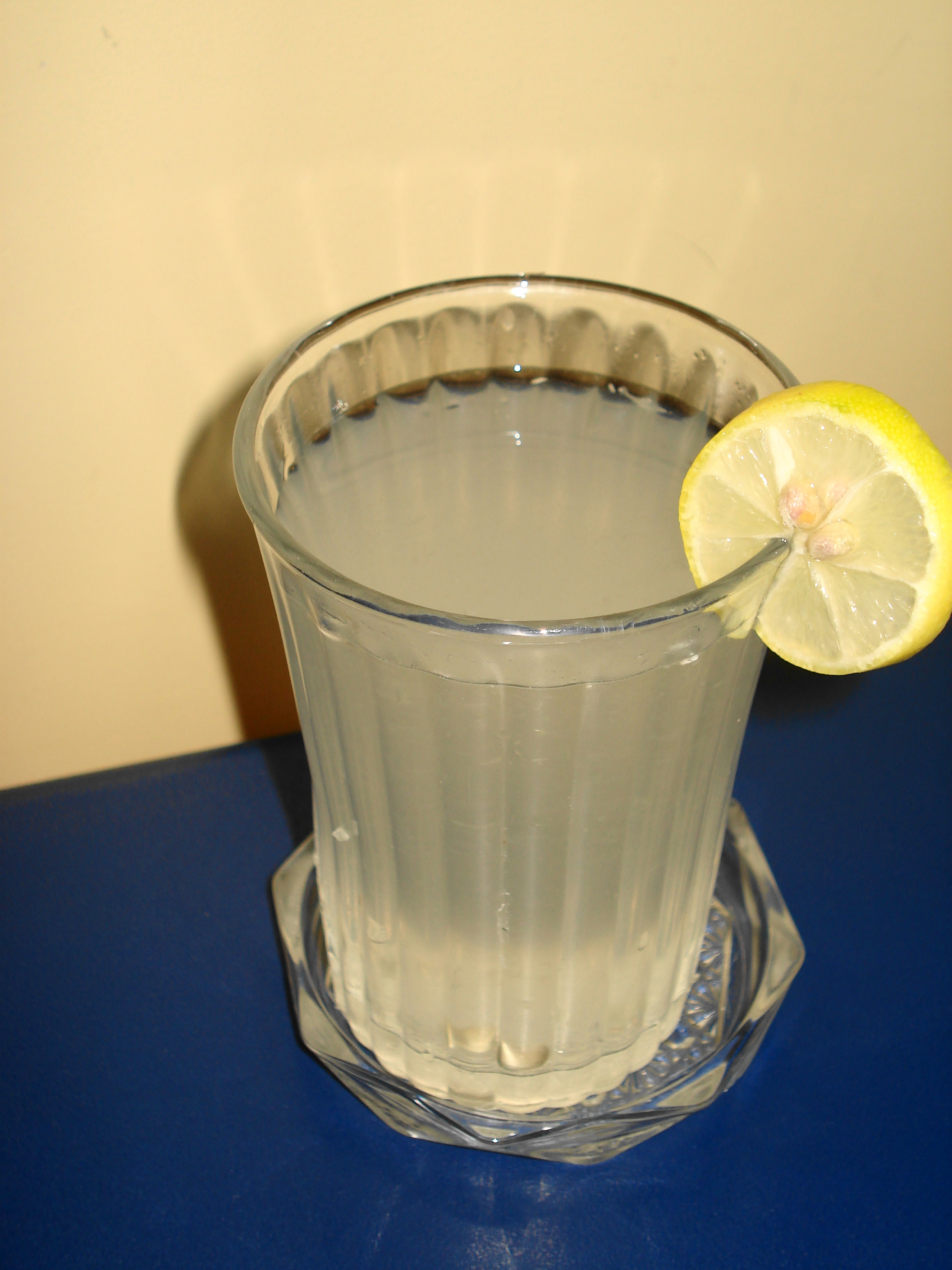
Lemonade

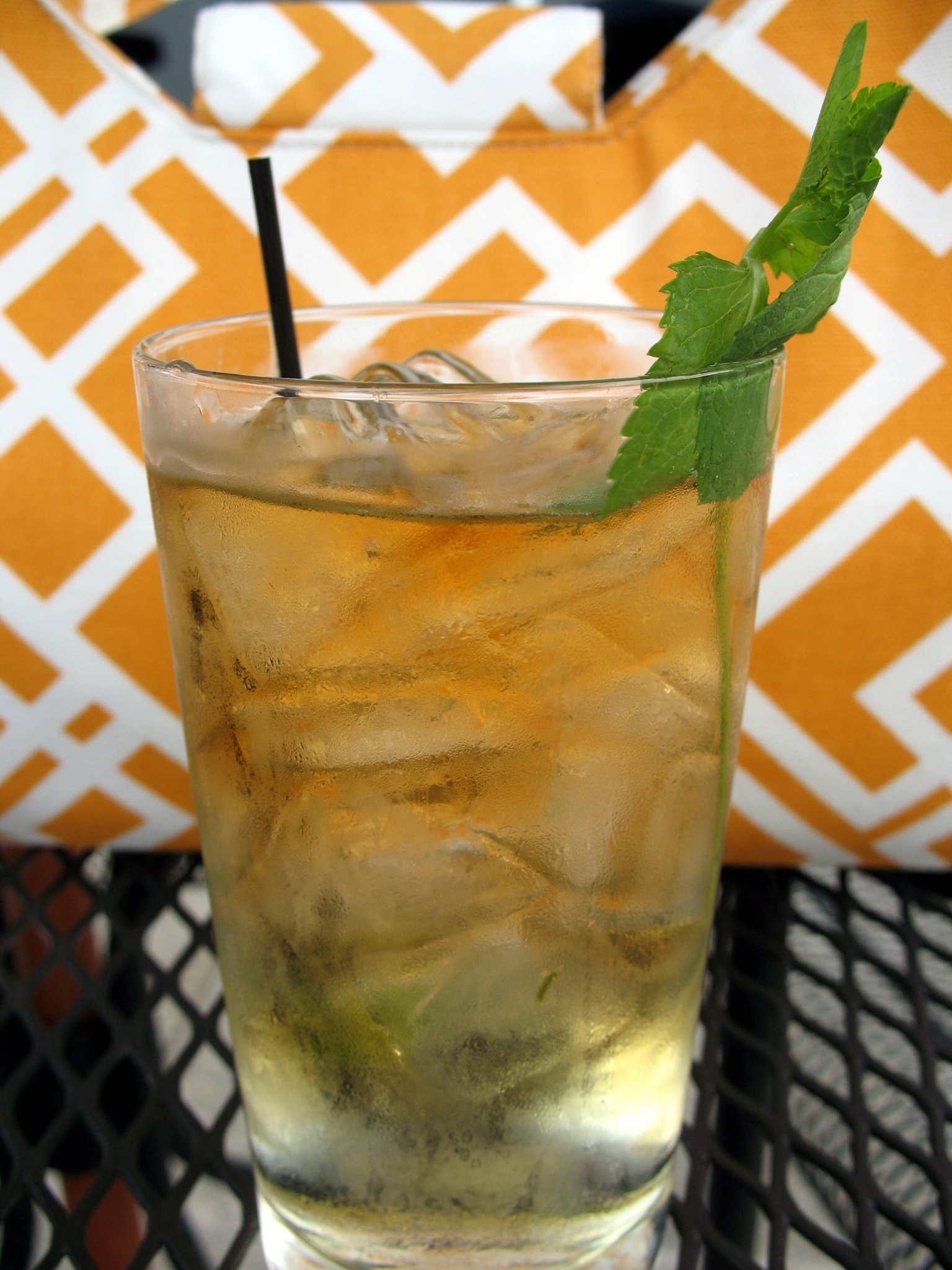
A mint julep

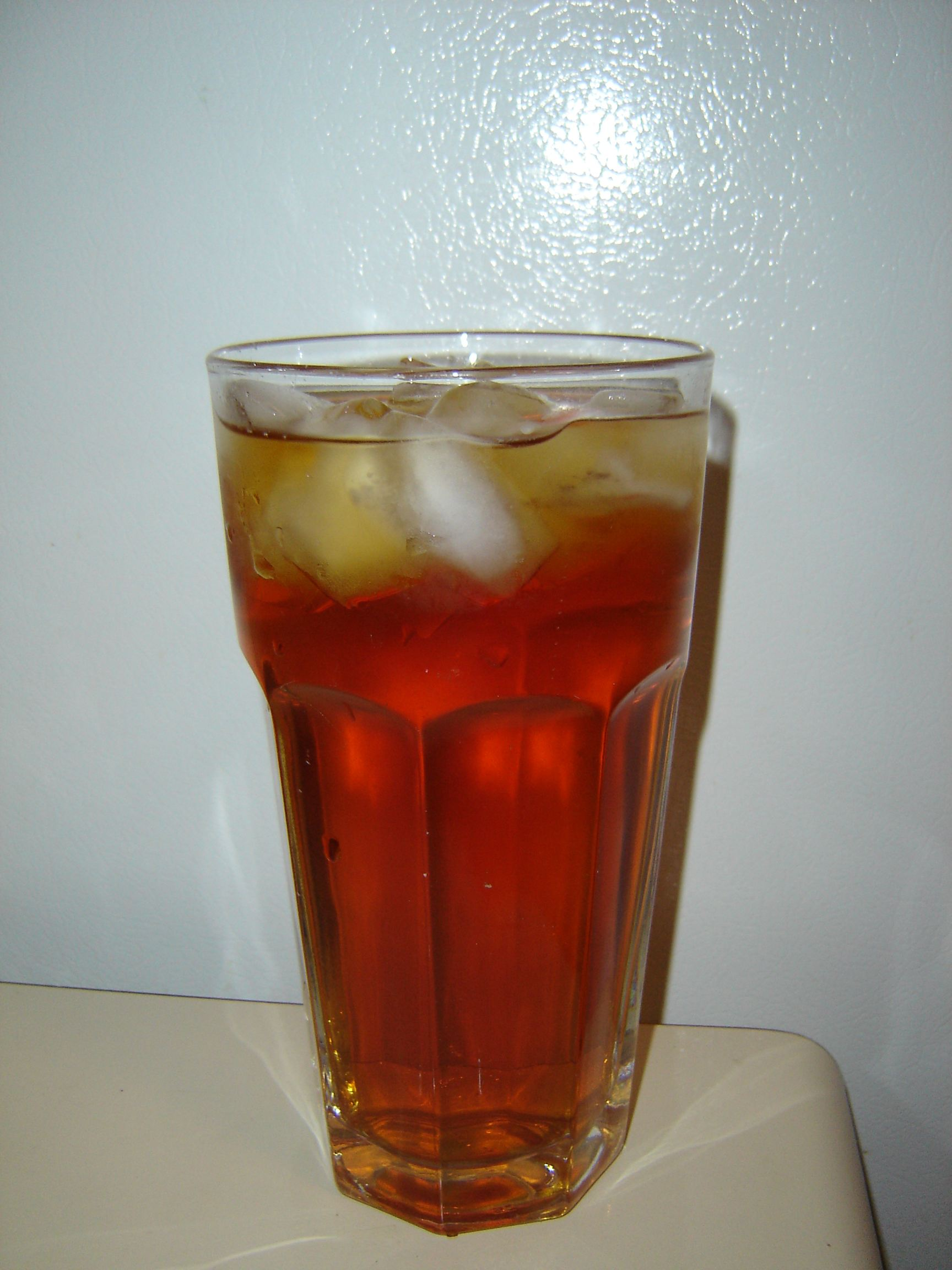
Sweet tea

- Alabama slammer – a cocktail made with amaretto, Southern Comfort, sloe gin, and orange juice, served in a Collins glass
- Ale-8-One – made in Winchester, Kentucky
- Barq's Root Beer – first made in Biloxi, Mississippi
- Big Red – cream soda originally from Waco, Texas
- Blenheim Ginger Ale
- Bourbon – made in central Kentucky
- Brownie Chocolate Drink
- Buffalo Rock ginger ale
- Buttermilk
- Cheerwine – a North Carolina–based cherry flavored drink
- Coca-Cola – first made in Atlanta
- Double Cola – based in Chattanooga, Tennessee; also produces Ski soda
- Dr. Enuf – available in eastern Tennessee
- Dr Pepper – a popular drink in Texas before achieving national popularity
- Grapette – grape soda first made in 1939 in Camden, Arkansas; currently available exclusively at Wal-Mart stores nationwide
- Grapico – grape soda made by Buffalo Rock
- Hurricane Punch
- Kentucky Common - a once-popular style of ale from the area in and around Louisville, Kentucky until Prohibition.
- Lemonade
- Mello Yello – a lemon-lime soda product of the Coca-Cola Company, sold primarily in the South
- Mint julep – associated with the Kentucky Derby and The Great Gatsby
- Mountain Dew – originally made in Knoxville, Tennessee
- Muscadine wine and juice – usually homemade, though also commercially available from some regional vineyards
- Nehi soda – produced by RC Cola, including grape, peach, and orange flavors
- Orange juice from Florida
- Pepsi – first made in New Bern, North Carolina
- RC Cola – first made in Columbus, Georgia
- Red Rock Cola – invented in Atlanta in 1885, predating Coca-Cola
- Rum – several small-batch varieties, primarily in and around New Orleans
- Sassafras tea
- Sazerac cocktail
- Slurpee – frozen drink sold by 7-Eleven originally of Dallas, Texas
- Southern Comfort – New Orleans–based neutral spirit, with sweeteners and peach flavor added
- Sun Drop – citrus drink found in northern Alabama, central Tennessee, the Carolinas, western Kentucky, southeastern Missouri, and parts of Virginia
- Sunny Delight (SunnyD) – invented in Mount Dora, Florida, in 1964
- Sugarcane juice
- Sweet tea – usually served with ice, lemon, and sugar, sometimes with mint
- Tennessee whiskey – Jack Daniel's and George Dickel are the two major producers

== Breads ==
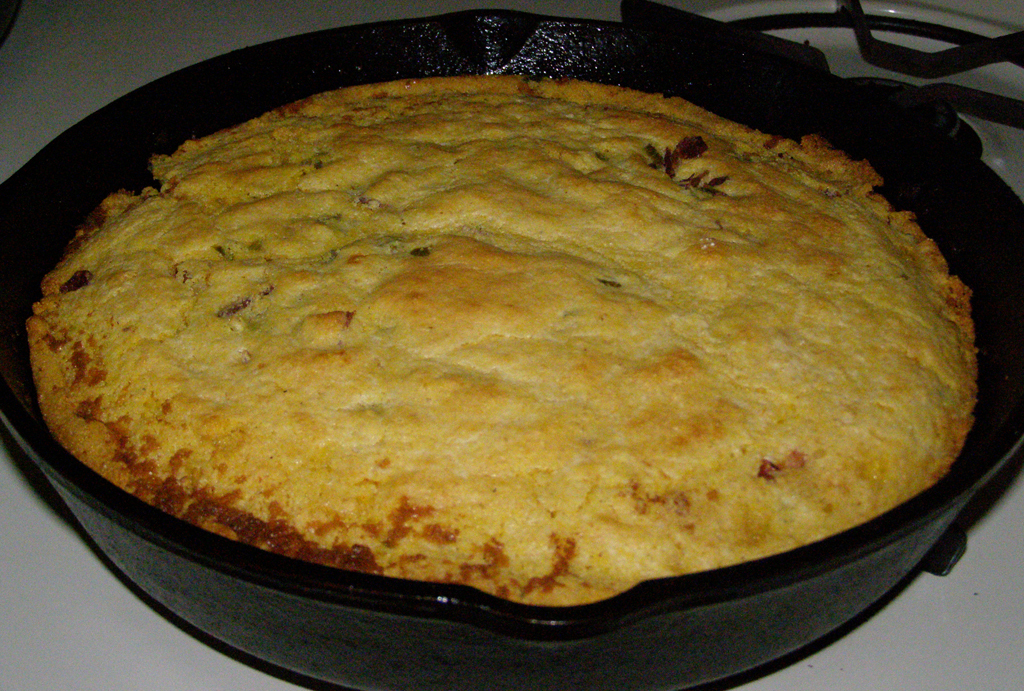
Skillet cornbread

- Banana bread
- Cuban bread
- Biscuits – traditionally prepared with buttermilk
- Corn pone – also called hoecake, Johnny cake
- Cornbread – corn meal, wheat flour, milk, buttermilk or water, leavening, sometimes oil and usually egg; may be sweet or savory
- Cracklin' cornbread – has pork cracklins in it
- Hush puppies
- Gingerbread – known in some parts of the deep south as molasses bread
- Cornmeal mush – also known as coush coush in the Deep South
- Pumpkin bread
- Spoonbread – a traditional colonial dish
- Yeast rolls
- Zucchini bread

== Desserts and sweets ==
=== Cakes ===
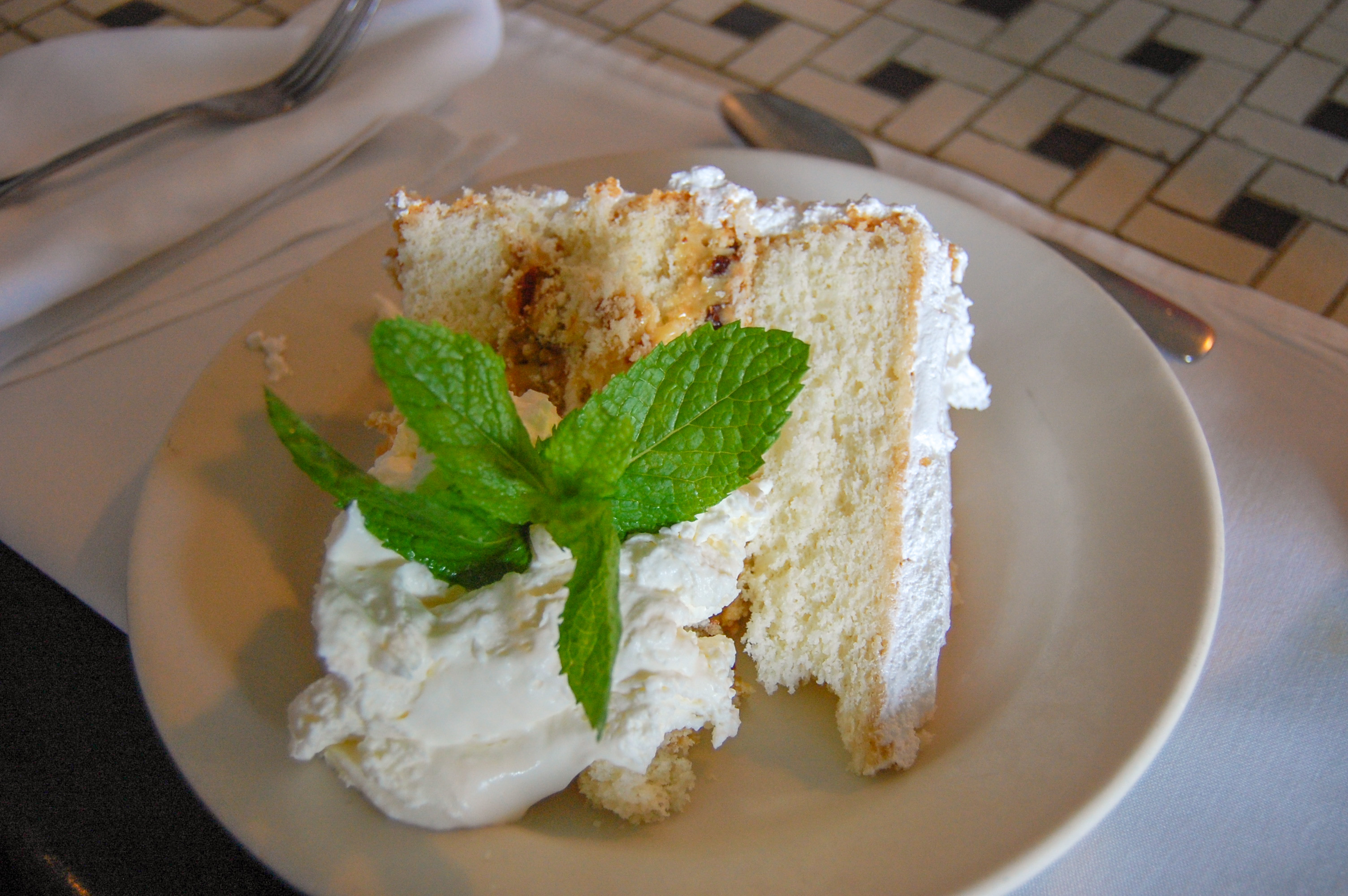
Lane cake

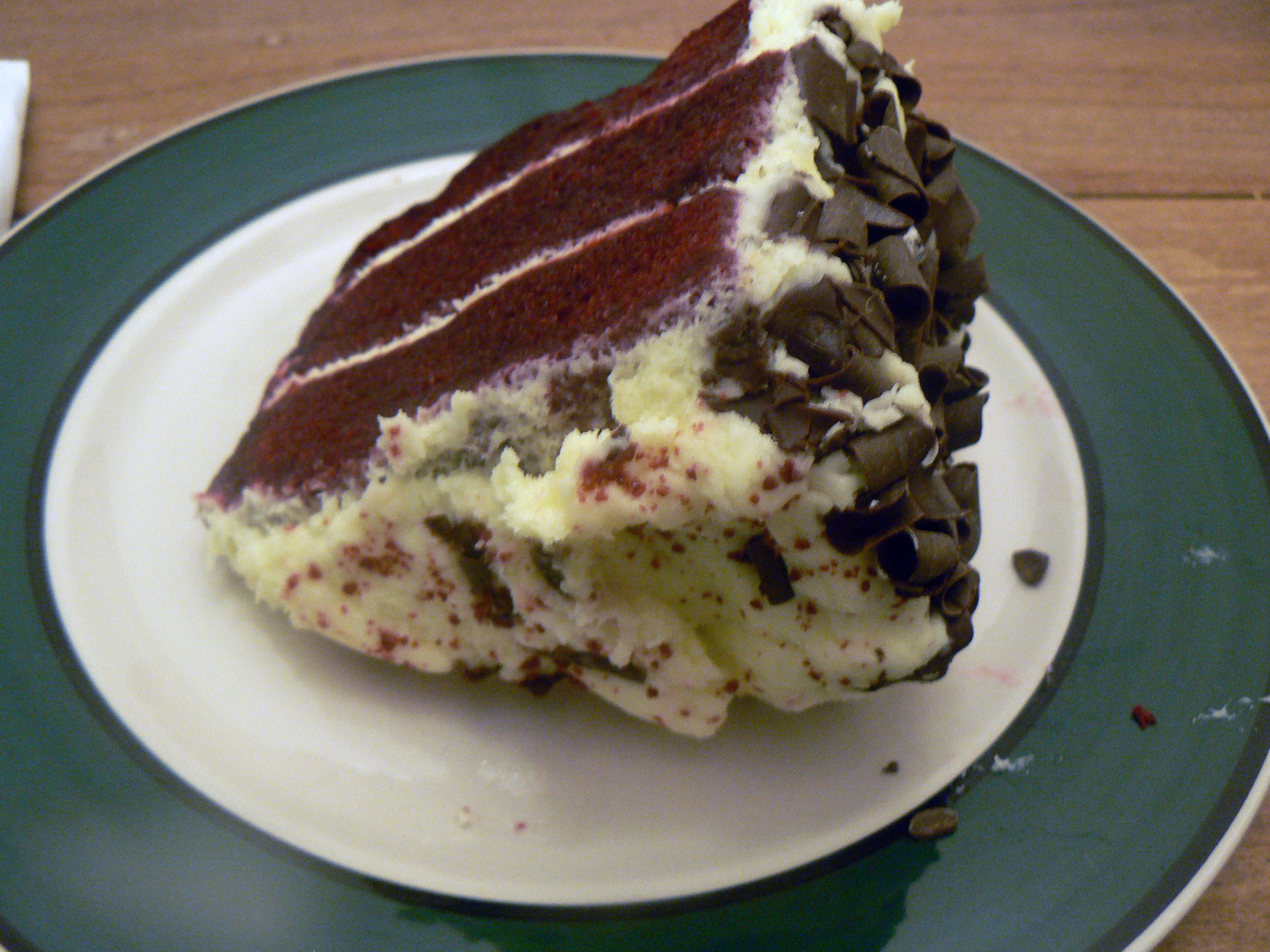
Red velvet cake

- Baltimore peach cake
- Butter pecan cake
- Caramel cake
- Coconut cake
- Doberge cake
- Fruit cake
- Hummingbird cake
- Italian cream cake
- Jelly and cake
- King cake
- Kentucky jam cake
- Lady Baltimore cake
- Lane cake
- Moravian sugar cake
- Peach shortcake
- Pig pickin' cake – usually made with boxed yellow cake mix infused with canned mandarin oranges; frosted with a whipped topping, vanilla pudding and coconut icing
- Pound cake
- Red velvet cake
- Stack cake – usually five or more layers with chocolate or apple butter filling
- Strawberry shortcake
- Tipsy cake

=== Candies ===
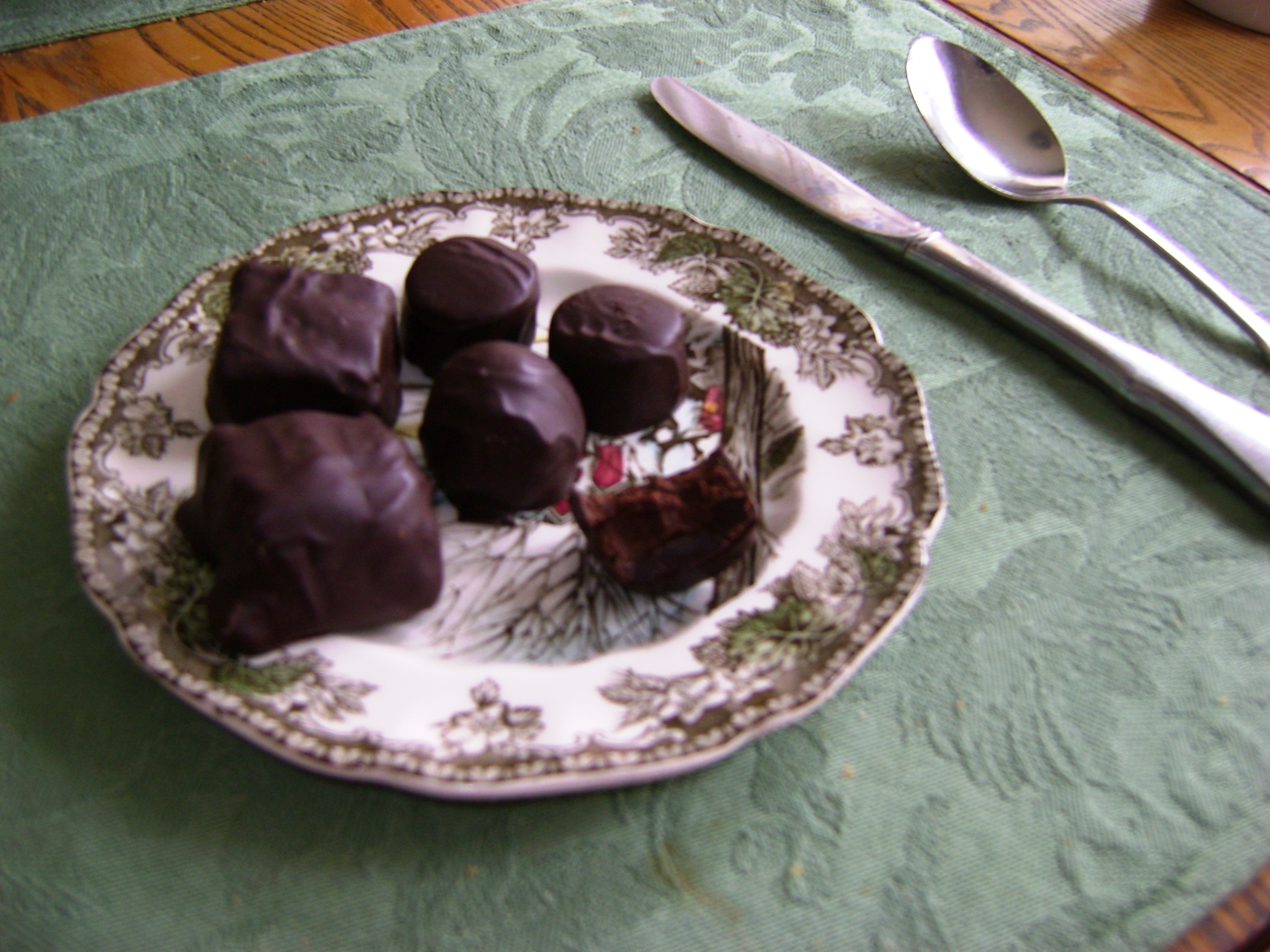
Bourbon balls

- Beens seed candy – such as Benne Brittle, found primarily in the coastal regions of Georgia and South Carolina
- Bourbon balls
- Divinity
- Goo Goo Cluster
- Haystacks
- Kentucky cream candy – a pulled candy that is prepared with cream; usually made during the colder months (40 deg or below) of the year when humidity is low
- Modjeska
- Moon pie
- Peanut brittle
- Pecan brittle
- Pecan Divinity
- Pralines – a specialty of New Orleans

=== Cobblers ===
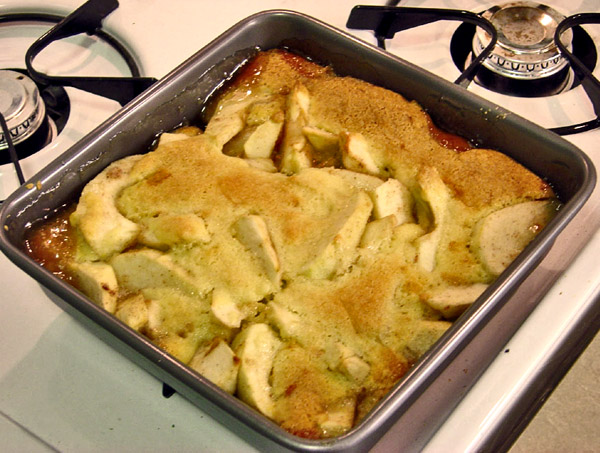
An apple cobbler

- Apple Brown Betty – a traditional colonial dessert
- Blackberry cobbler
- Dewberry cobbler
- Peach cobbler
- Sweet potato sonker

=== Cookies ===
- Butter pecan cookie
- Moravian spice cookies – especially in North Carolina and Virginia
- Oatmeal cookie
- Peanut butter cookie
- Tea cakes

=== Frozen ===
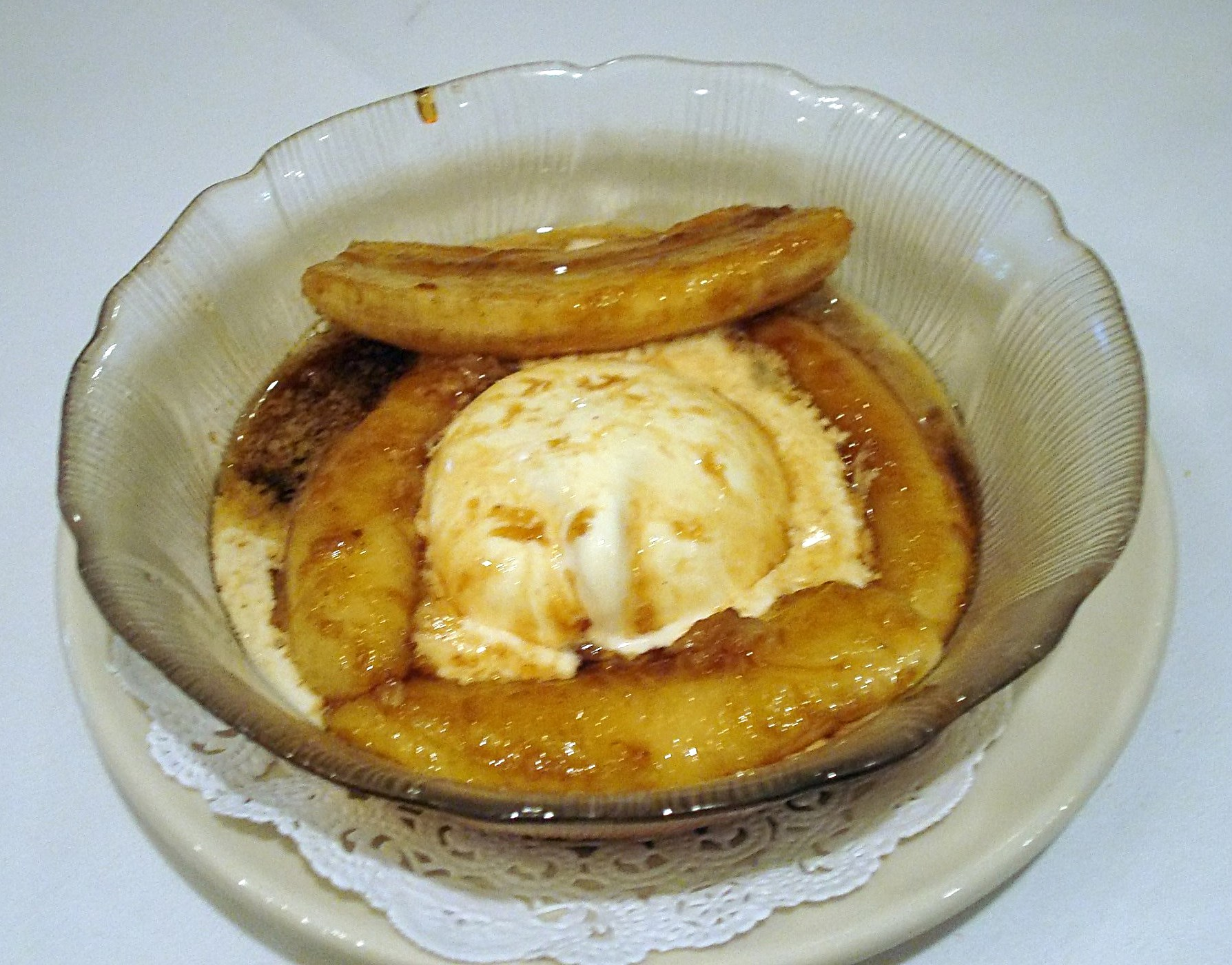
Bananas Foster

- Bananas Foster
- Blackberry ice cream
- Creole cream cheese ice cream
- Peach ice cream
- Pecan-praline ice cream
- Snow cone
- Strawberry ice cream

=== Pies ===
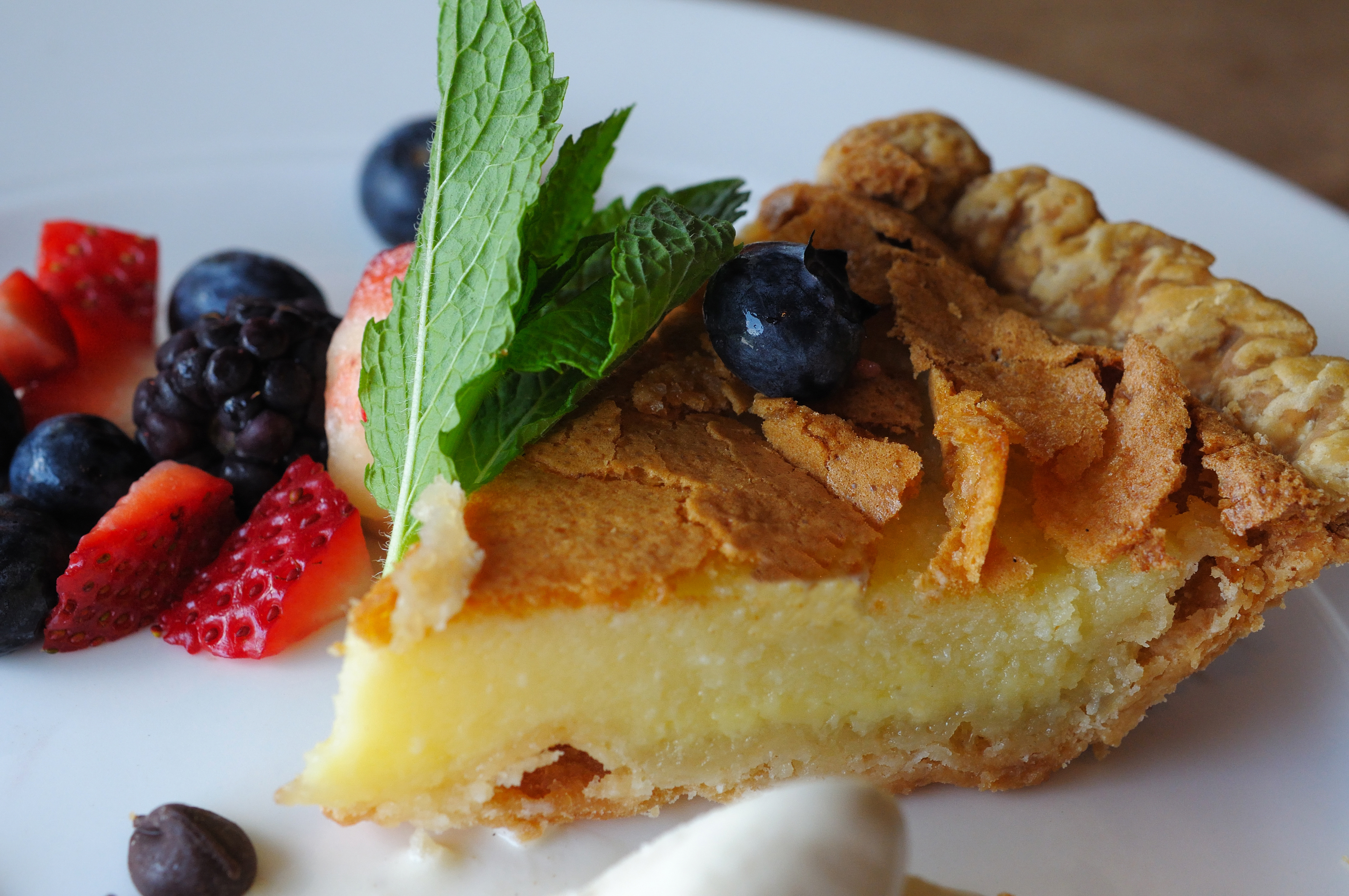
Buttermilk pie

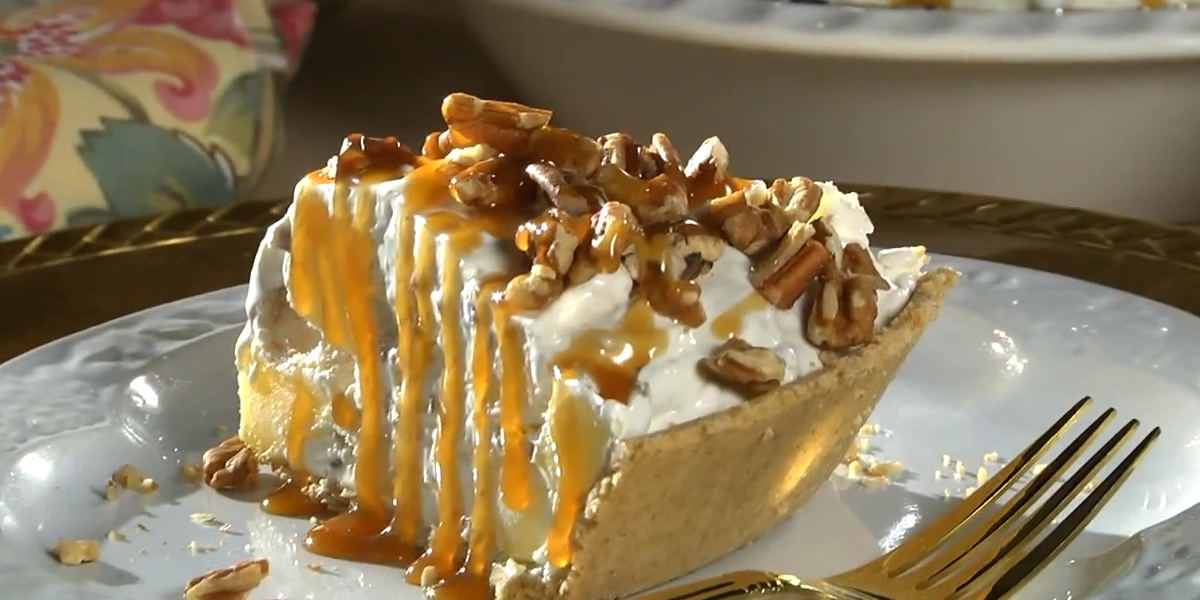
Millionaire pie

- Apple pie
- Black bottom pie
- Blueberry pie
- Buttermilk pie
- Chess pie
- Coconut chess pie
- Blackberry pie – from the native blackberry ripening in early summer
- Grape hull pie – scuppernong or muscadine grape pie
- Jefferson Davis pie – a molasses pie containing dates
- Key lime pie
- Lemon ice box pie
- Lemon Meringue Pie
- Millionaire pie
- Mississippi mud pie
- Peanut pie
- Pecan pie – made with any variety of pecan, an elegant rendition of the dessert often served in Florida and Georgia uses the plump, perfectly round Elliot Pecan
- Shoofly pie – found in parts of the South where Pennsylvania Dutch settled, such as the valleys of Virginia
- Squash pie
- Strawberry pie
- Sweet potato pie

=== Puddings ===
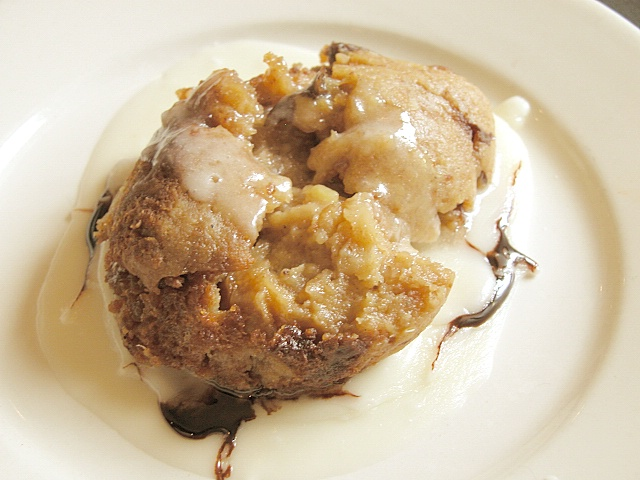
Bread pudding

- Banana pudding
- Bread pudding
- Chocolate pudding
- Corn pudding
- Grits pudding
- Indian pudding
- Lemon pudding
- Persimmon pudding
- Sweet potato dumplings
- Sweet potato pudding
- Trifle

=== Pastries ===
- Cream puff
- Hand pie – biscuit or pie pastry filled usually filled with cooked dried apples, peaches and cherries, either baked or fried
- Fritters – apple, peach, or sweet potato

== Meats, poultry and seafood ==
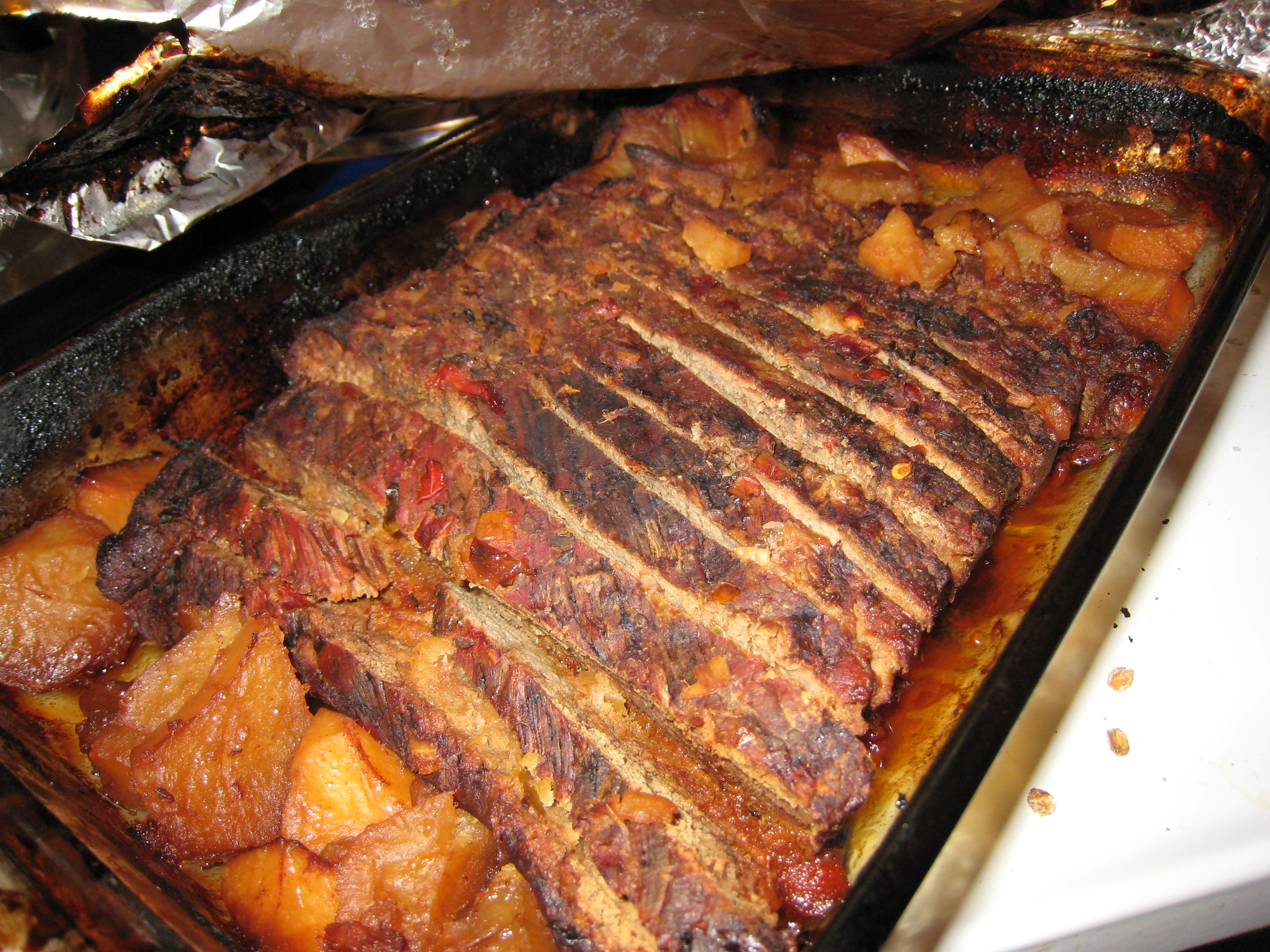
A pan of beef brisket, fresh out of the oven

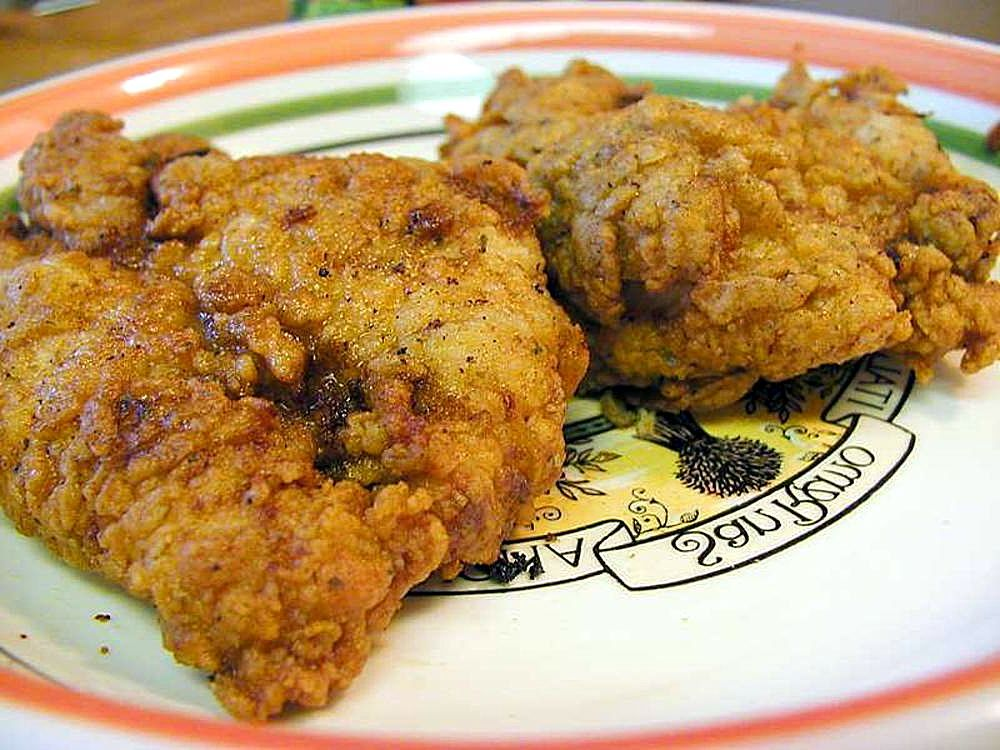
Fried chicken

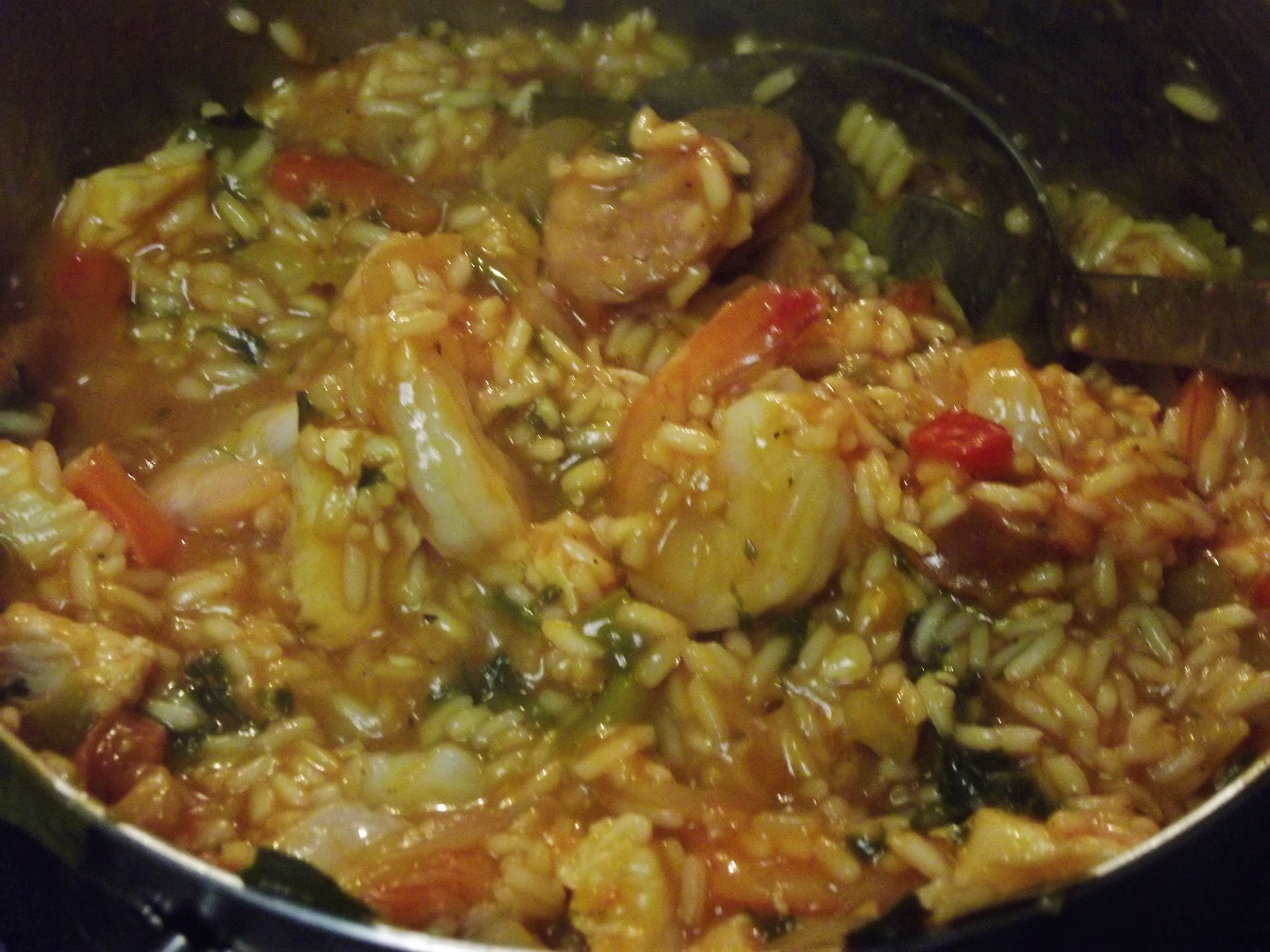
Jambalaya cooking in a pan

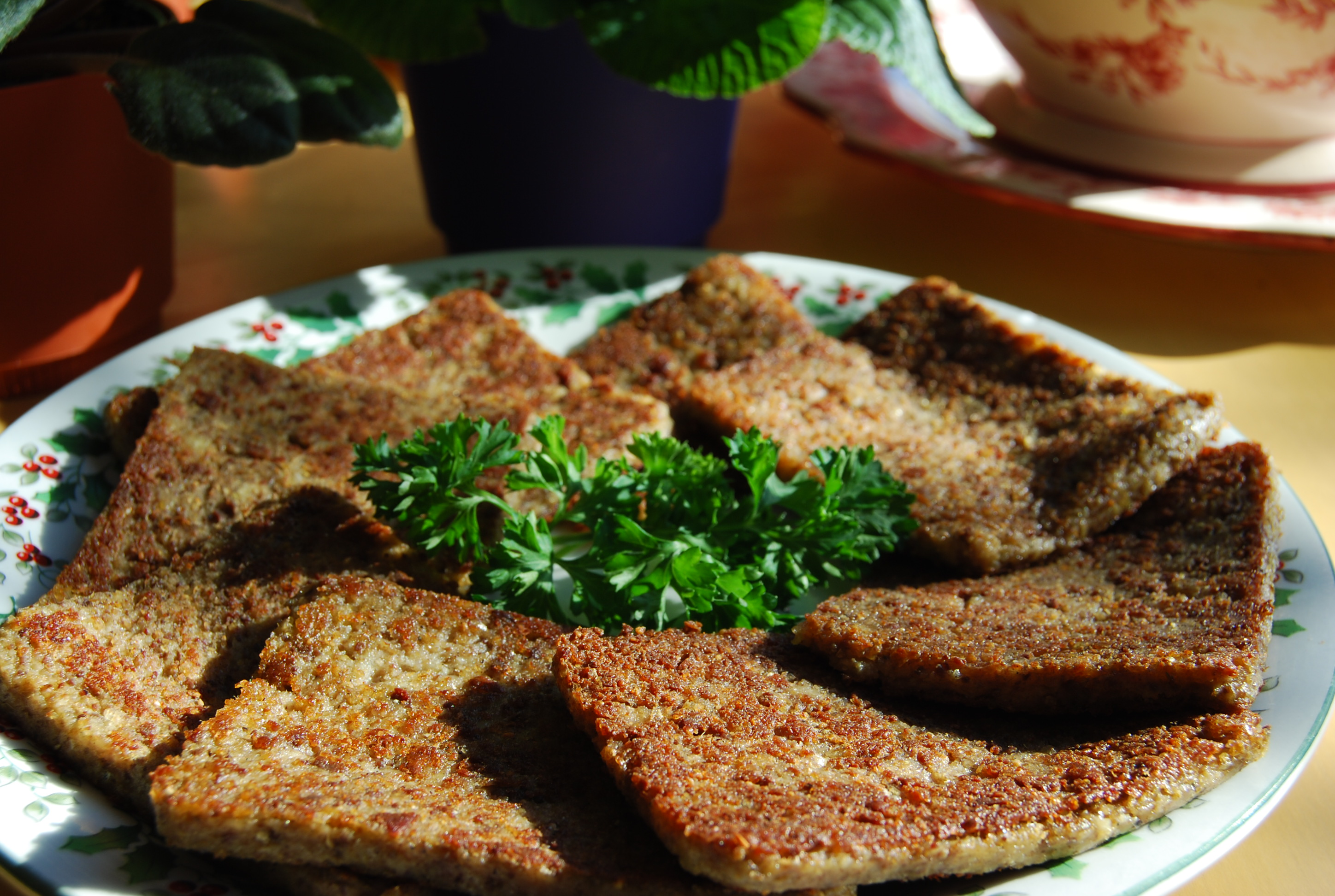
A pound of sliced, pan-fried livermush garnished with parsley

- Alligator meat – typically served fried
- Barbecue – usually pork or beef, but also chicken; seasoning and preparation vary greatly within the region, though most commonly pork-based in areas east of Texas
  - Beef brisket – popular especially in Texas
  - Beer can chicken – barbecued chicken where an open can of beer is placed into the cavity of the chicken
  - Boucherie – a style of barbecue common to Cajuns in South Louisiana where the pig is eaten snout to tail
  - Bull roast – barbecue where the head and feet of an entire bull are removed and the whole thing is slowly barbecued on a spit over hot coals; native to Maryland
  - Pork ribs – may be prepared "wet" or "dry" style
  - Pulled pork – popular in Tennessee, North Carolina, South Carolina and Virginia
  - Pulled pork sandwich – a slow-cooked chopped, pork shoulder sandwich topped with crispy coleslaw or red slaw (the latter for "Lexington-style" North Carolina barbecue
- Beaver tail stew – consumed in Arkansas
- Boudin – a spicy sausage, with rice as a central filler, from Cajun Louisiana
- Chicken and dumplings
- Chicken fried steak
- Chicken gizzards – fried
- Chitlins (chitterlings) – small intestine of a hog
  - Chitlins and maw
- Country captain
- Crab cake – popular along the Chesapeake Bay (Maryland and Virginia), where the crab cake is typically not dredged in bread crumbs, and in Louisiana, where it typically is
- Crawfish – also called crawdad, crayfish
- Fried chicken – usually flour-battered.
  - Hot chicken – a spicy variant of fried chicken coated in hot oil or melted lard and pepper
- Fried fish and seafood – battered or dredged in cornmeal then pan fried or deep fried
  - Calabash-style seafood – popular in the coastal Carolinas
  - Catfish – usually fried, whole or fillets
  - Mullet – fried, extremely popular in the Florida panhandle
- Fried pork chops
- Fried turkey – deep fried using an outdoor frier
- Game meat – venison, rabbit, and game fowl are most common, but opossum, squirrel, and raccoon also may be eaten, especially in more remote areas
- Grits and grillades – a Louisiana brunch staple
- Ham – usually pan fried, roasted, or smoked; varieties include "sugar-cured" or "country" (salt-cured)
- Ham hocks
- Hot hamburger plate – a slice of white bread topped with a hamburger patty, French fries and gravy
- Jambalaya
- Liver – usually pan-fried pork or chicken liver, but also beef
- Livermush
- Lobster – typically only eaten in Florida where the Caribbean Spiny Lobster and the Caribbean lobster are native; these may be split and seasoned with piquant spices before being grilled
- Monroe Sausage – a specialty of Alabama.
- Moravian chicken pie – a traditional dish from the Piedmont region of North Carolina
- Oyster stew – often eaten on Christmas Eve
- Quail
- Raccoon meat
- Reptiles and amphibians – most notably alligator and frog legs, eaten in much of the South
- Salmon croquettes
- Shrimp and grits
- Shrimp Creole
- Stuffed ham – a specialty in Southern Maryland
- Smithfield ham – a specialty of Smithfield, Virginia
- Souse meat – also called head cheese
- Squirrel meat
- Hot links

== Sandwiches ==
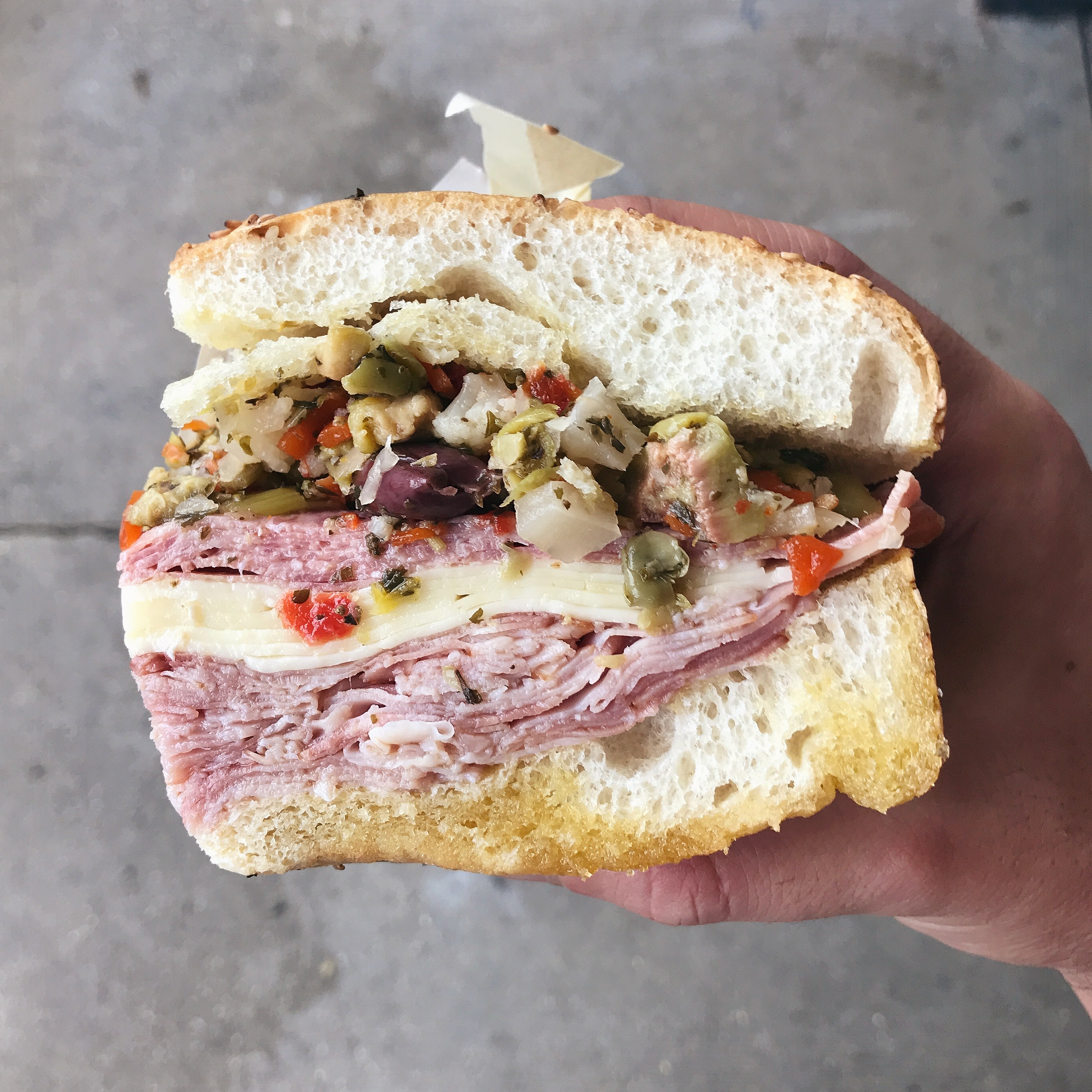
Cross-section view of a muffuletta sandwich in New Orleans, Louisiana

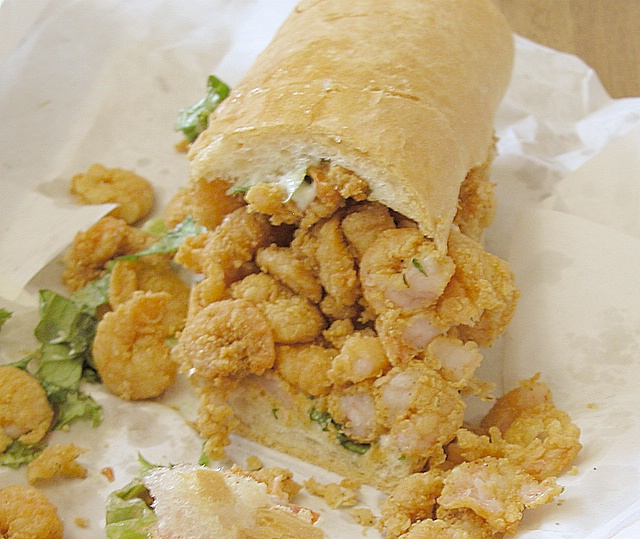
A shrimp po' boy sandwich

- Muffuletta sandwich
- Peanut butter and banana sandwich
- Po' boy sandwich
- Tomato sandwich, according to Garden & Gun "the south's most beloved sandwich"

== Side dishes and condiments ==
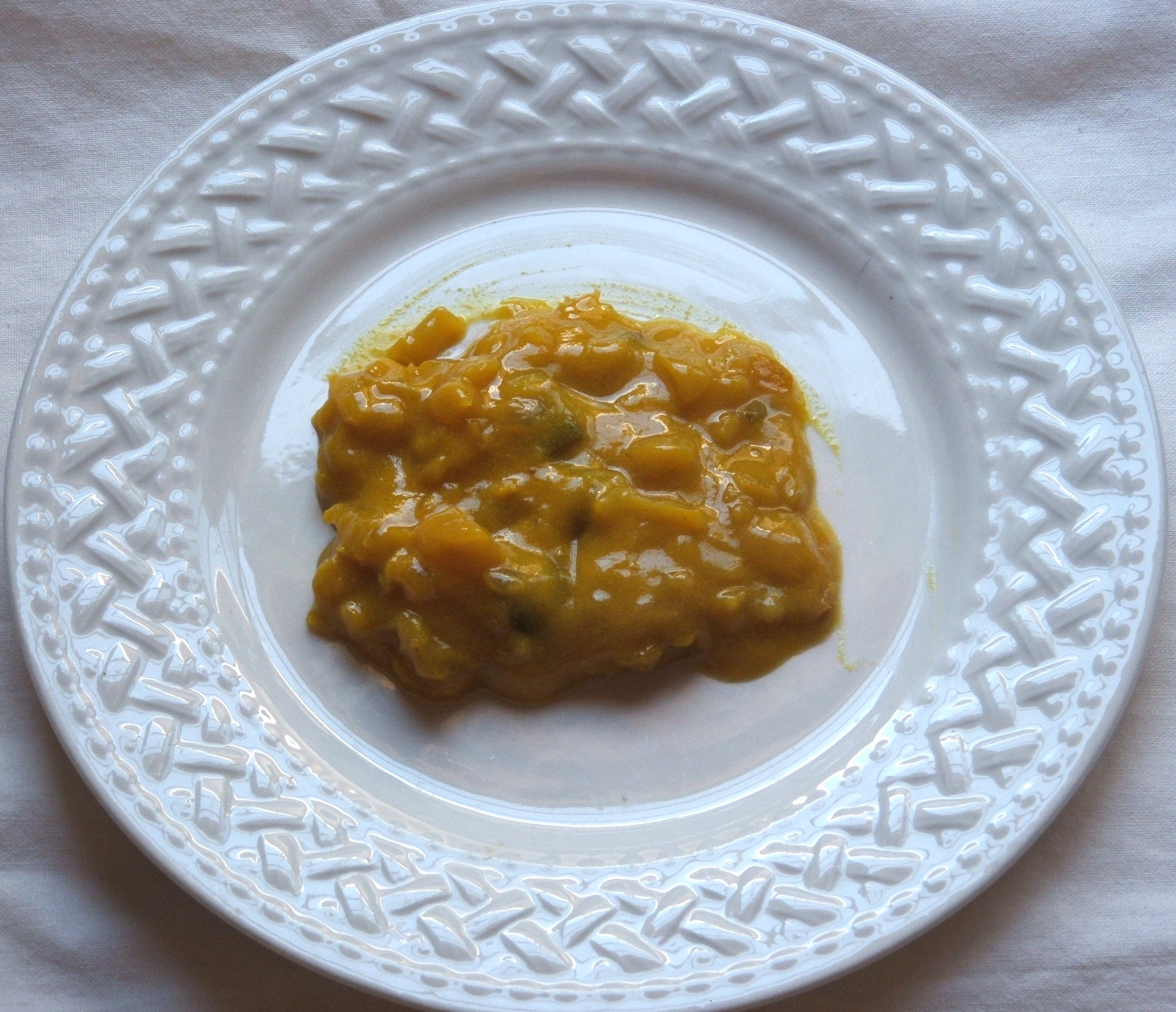
Chow-chow is a condiment

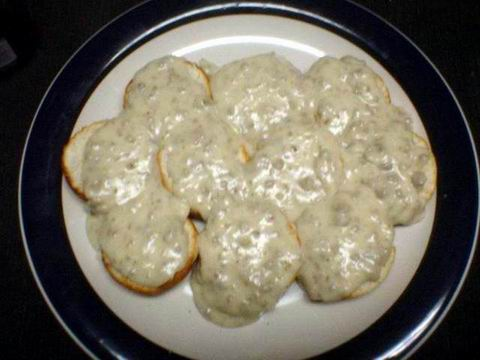
Sausage gravy served atop biscuits

- Apple butter
- Barbecue sauce – numerous varieties throughout the region, sometimes even within same state; most use a primarily vinegar, tomato, or mustard base
- Barbecue spaghetti
- Cane syrup
- Cayenne peppers
- Chow-chow
- Cole slaw – cabbage salad/relish, typically made with mayonnaise and sometimes sugar, except in parts of North Carolina and Virginia, where it instead may be vinegar-based and savory ("barbecue slaw")
- Cornbread dressing – similar to traditional stuffing, but using cornbread as a base and prepared separately from the meat
- Cracklin' – fried pork rind
- Deviled eggs
- Goober peas
- Gravy-served liberally over meats, potatoes, biscuits and rice
  - Chocolate gravy – made with milk, fat, flour, cocoa powder, and sugar, served over biscuits
  - Red-eye gravy – made with black coffee and meat drippings (usually ham), typically served with country ham and grits
  - Sausage gravy – milk-based country gravy typically served over hot biscuits
  - Tomato gravy – canned tomato-based, made in a cast-iron skillet with browned flour, served over rice
- Grits
  - Cheese grits
  - Fried grits
- Hot sauce
  - Tabasco sauce – trademarked, aged hot sauce made in Louisiana
  - Texas Pete – hot sauce made in Winston-Salem, North Carolina

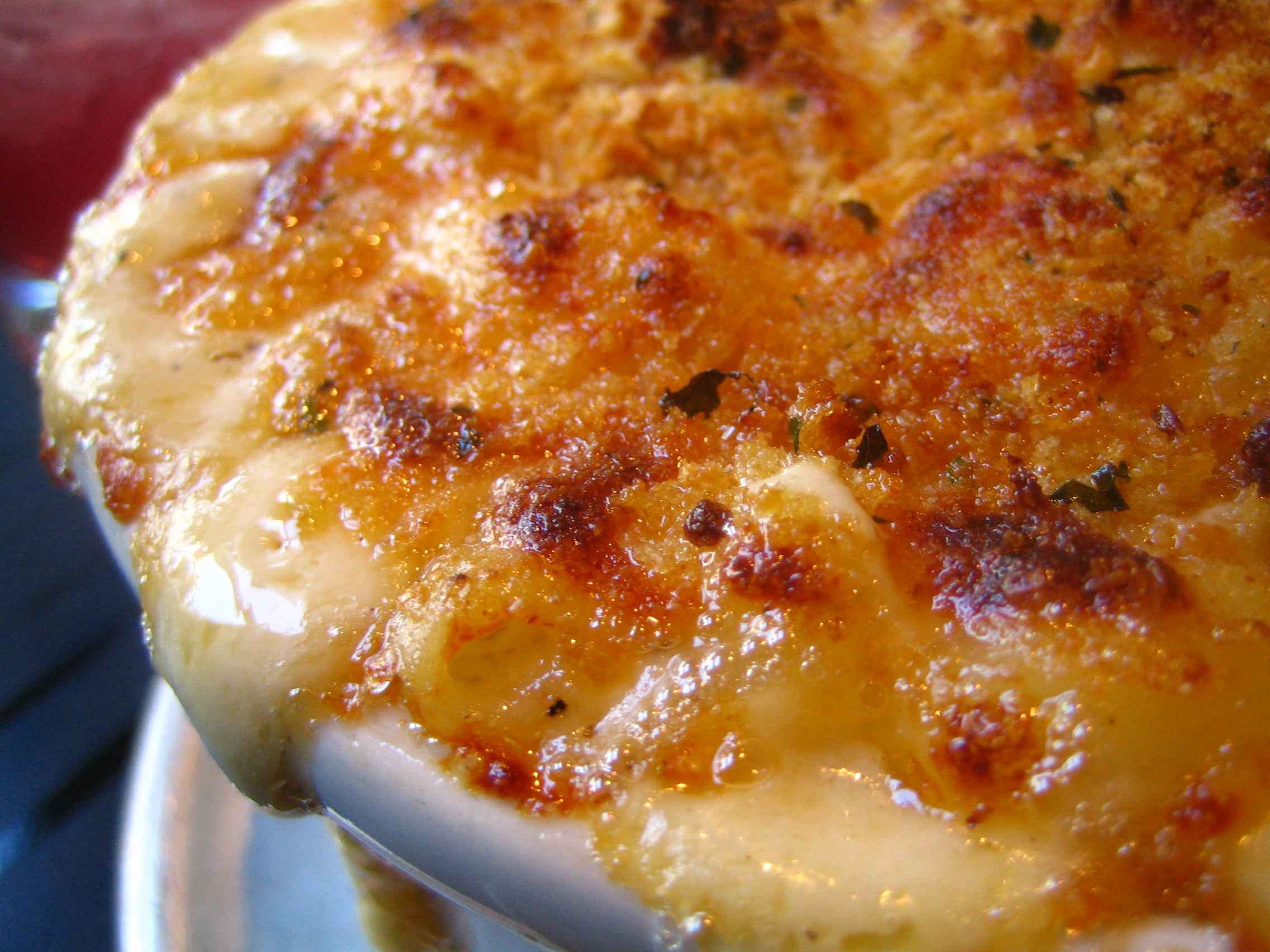
Macaroni and cheese

- Macaroni and cheese – usually prepared with fresh eggs and baked en casserole
- Mayhaw jelly
- Muscadine jelly
- Old Bay Seasoning – made famous in Maryland
- Peanut butter
- Pepper jelly
- Pickle relish – usually used to make potato salad
- Pickled or brandied peaches
- Rice
  - Dirty rice
  - Red rice
- Sorghum molasses
- Watermelon rind pickles

== Soups, stews and boils ==
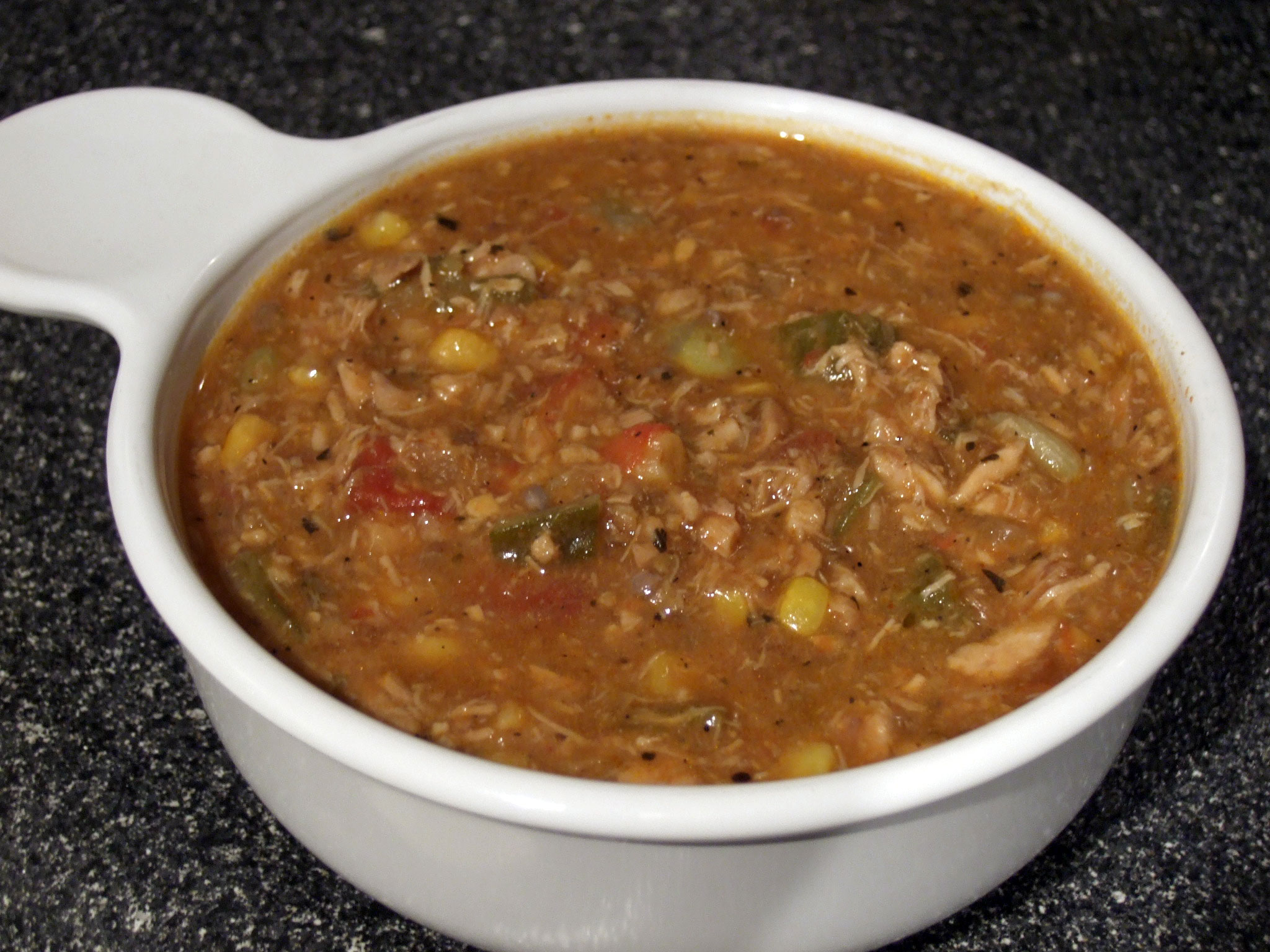
Brunswick stew

- Brunswick stew – originated in either Virginia or Georgia
- Burgoo – served at barbecues in western and central Kentucky, similar to Brunswick stew
- Chicken sauce piquant – chicken cooked in a tangy stew with tomatoes and spices, often served over rice, a favorite in southern Louisiana
- Conch chowder – mainly a specialty of Florida
- Étouffée – a very thick stew made of crawfish or chicken and sausage, okra and roux served over rice
- Gumbo – made with seafood or meat and okra; a Cajun/Creole delicacy
- Hoppin' John
- Low-country boil – any of several varieties
  - Frogmore stew – made with sausage, corn, crabs, and shrimp; popular in coastal South Carolina
  - Seafood muddle
- Peanut soup – one of the oldest dishes consumed in the South, brought by Africans, mainly a dish of Virginia
- Pilau – any number of dishes which combine rice stewed with meat and vegetables to serve with. Most popular being the chicken bog. (These dishes are popular in South Carolina due to the influence of rice cultivation on the history of South Carolina)
- She-crab soup – mainly served in the area around Charleston, South Carolina, and Savannah, Georgia, from Atlantic crabs
- Tomato soup – stewed tomatoes, okra and corn
- Turtle soup – mainly a Creole dish in Louisiana
- Terrapin stew – a historical dish of Atlantic Coast states such as Maryland and Virginia

== Vegetables and salads ==
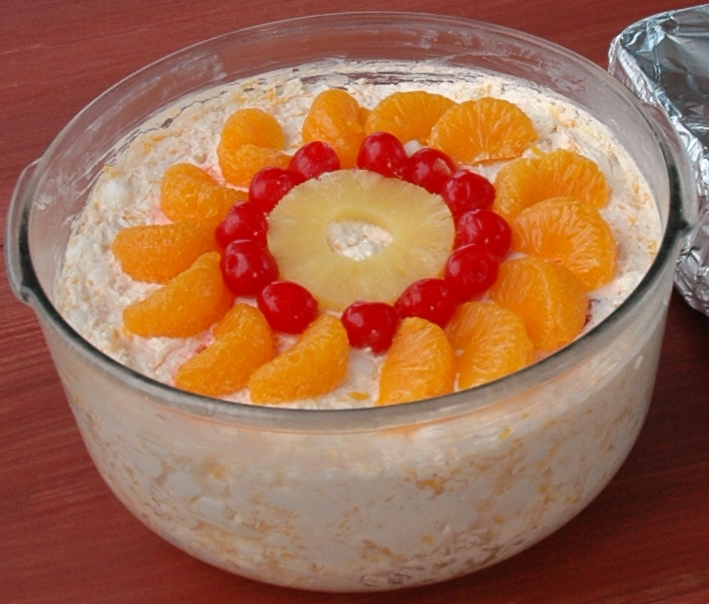
Ambrosia salad

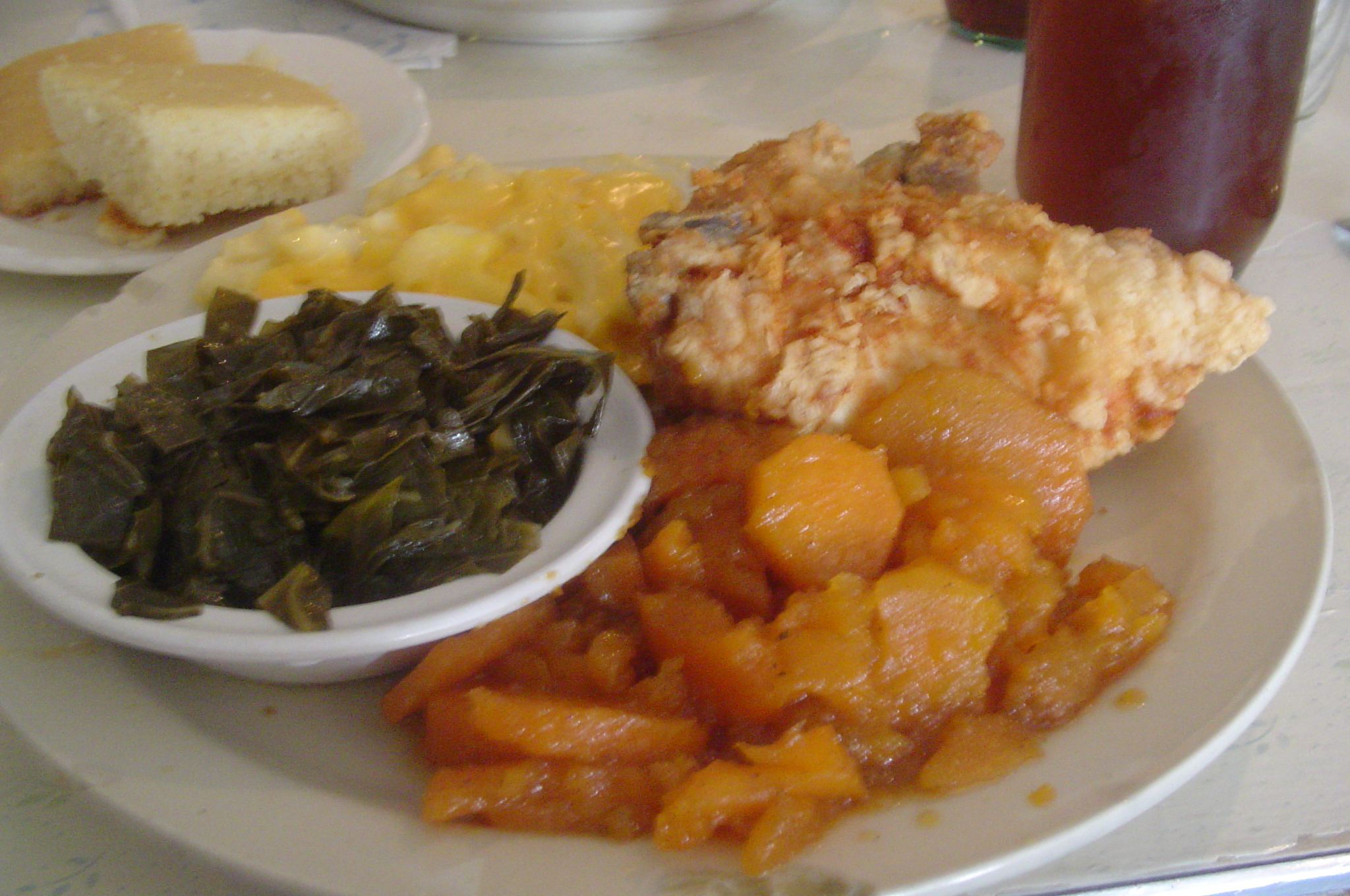
Collard greens (left), macaroni and cheese, fried chicken, yams and cornbread

- Ambrosia
- Beans – often cooked down with chunks of ham, bacon grease, or onions
  - Baked beans
  - Butter or lima beans
  - Green beans
  - Pinto beans and cornbread
  - Pole beans
  - White or great northern beans
- Greens – seasoned with some kind of meat or meat grease. The liquid left after cooking is known as pot liquor.
  - Collard greens
  - Creasy greens
  - Kale
  - Mustard greens
  - Poke salad – cooked pokeweed
  - Turnip greens
- Carrots – often "candied" with butter and brown sugar
  - Carrot raisin salad
- Congealed salad
- Corn
  - Corn fritters
  - Corn on the cob – boiled, steamed, or grilled; usually served with butter or mayonnaise
  - Corn pudding
  - Creamed corn
  - Shoepeg corn
- Hoppin' John – a traditional Low-Country dish of black-eyed peas served with rice

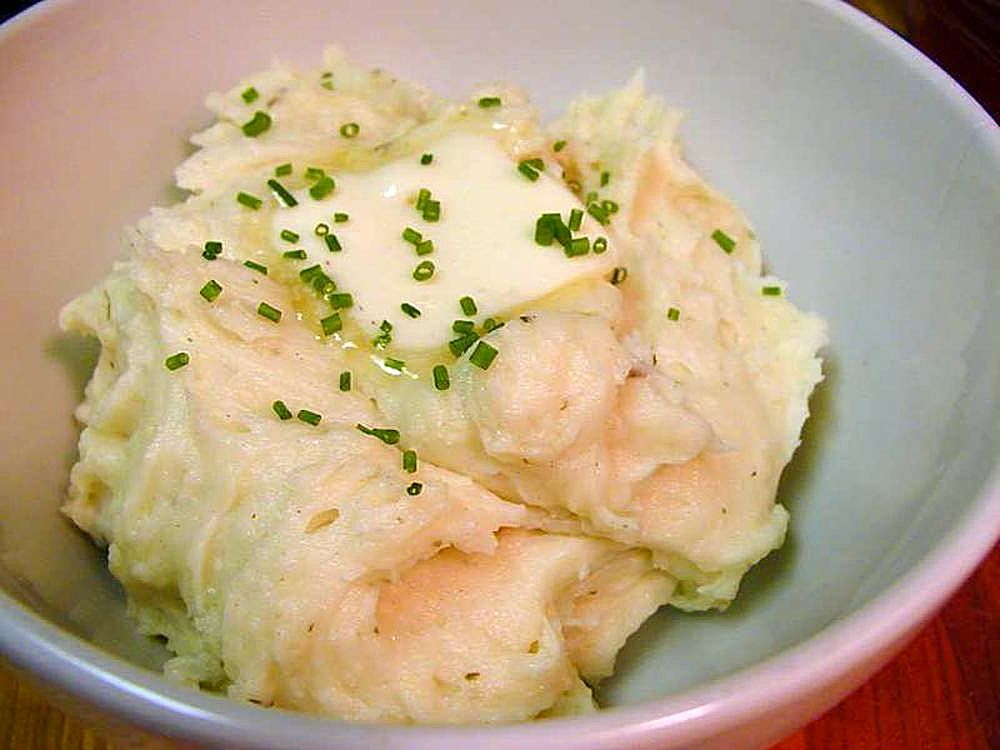
Mashed potatoes

- Mashed potatoes – called "creamed" in some regions
- Okra – flour-battered and pan-fried or boiled, stewed, or steamed
- Onion – sliced Vidalia onion, whole green onion, onion rings
- Peas – often cooked with chunks of ham or onions
  - Black-eyed peas
  - Crowder peas
  - Field peas
  - Purple hull peas
- Potato salad – usually made in the South with egg, mayonnaise, prepared mustard and pickle relish
- Ramp – wild leeks popular in the Appalachian mountains

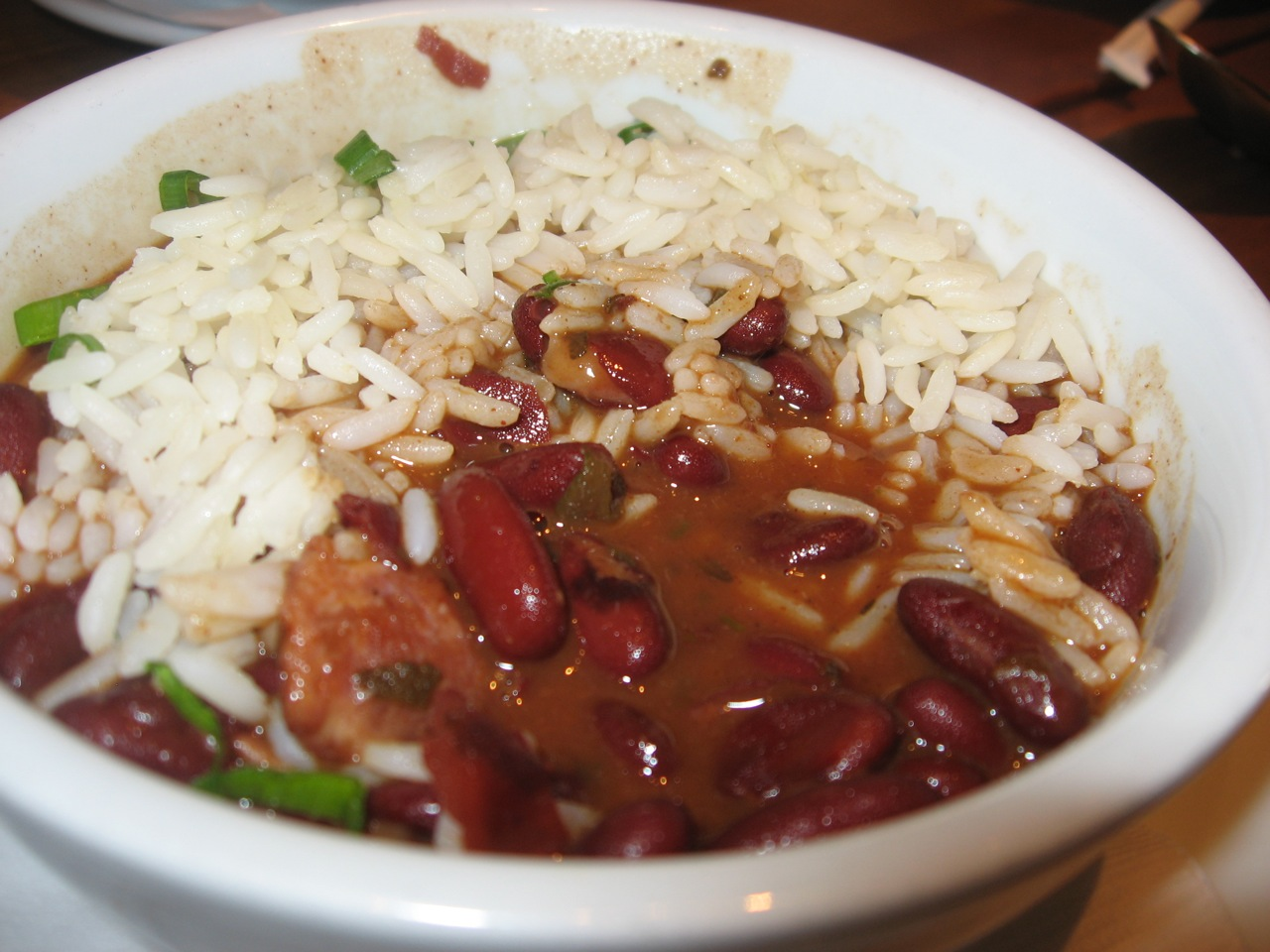
Red beans and rice

- Red beans and rice – slow cooked, spicy kidney beans, served over white long grain rice, most often with a spicy sausage on top or incorporated
- Seven-layer salad
- Succotash
- Summer squash – dredged in a mixture of cornmeal and flour and fried crisp with a light to medium browning, prepared en casserole, or made into pickles
- Swamp cabbage – heart of palm
- Tomatoes – sliced ripe, also eaten at breakfast
  - Fried green tomatoes
- Sweet potatoes – often as "candied yams" with butter and brown sugar
- Tomato aspic
- Vidalia onion – a sweet onion grown only in the state of Georgia, sold and popular throughout the South
- Wilted lettuce – with dressing, an Appalachian speciality

== Miscellaneous ==
- Beer cheese
- Boiled peanuts
- Chicken salad
- Confederate cush
- Creole cream cheese
- Fatback or hog jowl
- Frito pie
- Hoop cheese
- Peanuts and Coke
- Pickled pigs feet
- Pimento cheese
  - Palmetto Cheese – a brand of pimento cheese from Pawleys Island, South Carolina
- Vienna sausages

== See also ==
- List of soul foods and dishes
- Louisiana Creole cuisine
