= Dorignac's Food Center =

Supermarkets of the United States

Coordinates: 30.00055°N 90.12992°W

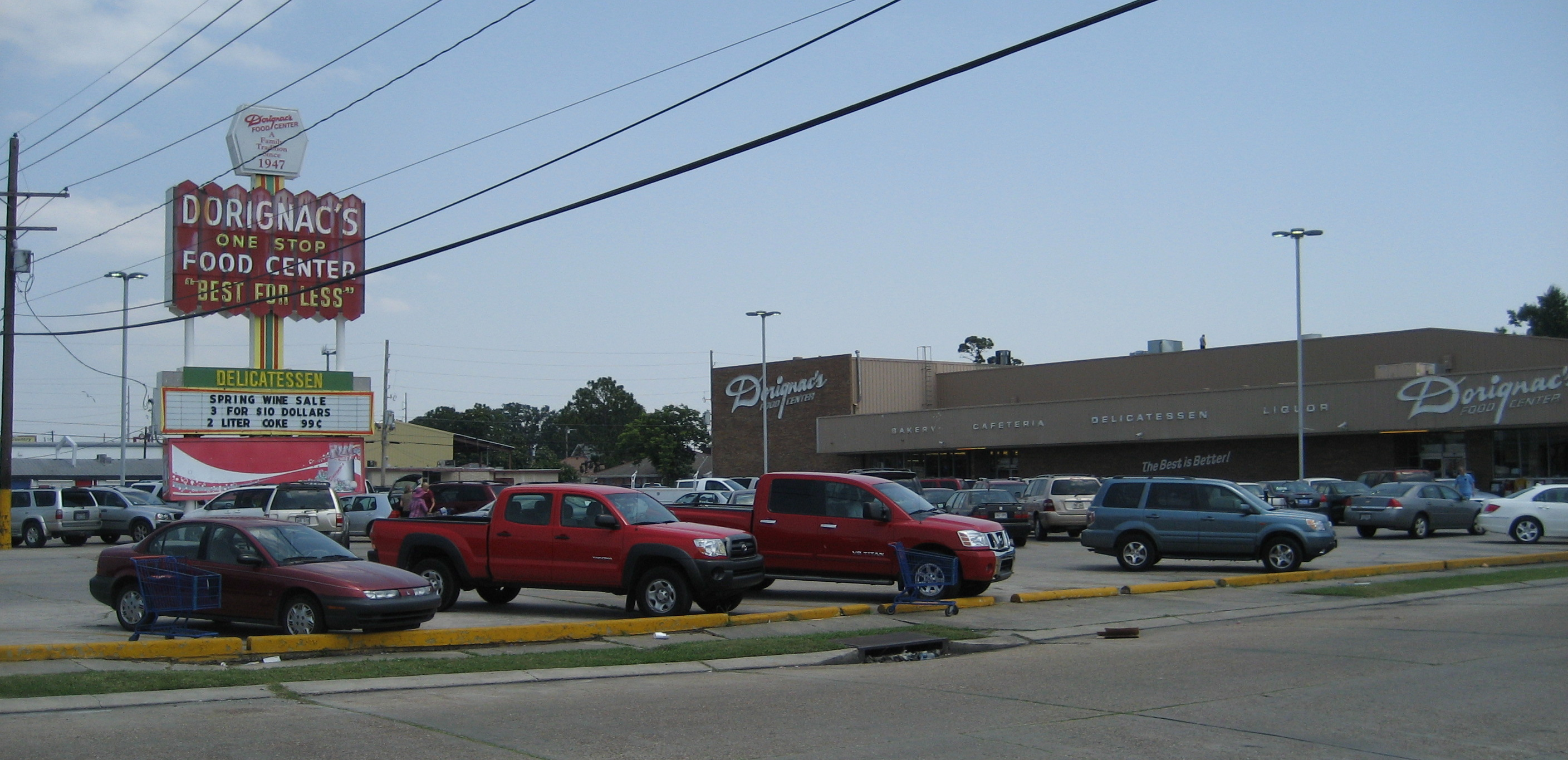
Dorignac's in 2007

Dorignac's Food Center is a historic food store on Veterans Memorial Boulevard in Metairie, Louisiana, near New Orleans, known for offering regional specialties.

== History ==
Joseph Dorignac, Jr. first opened a grocery store in 1947 on Jackson Avenue in the Lower Garden District before relocating in 1963 to Veterans Highway and Focis Street, near the Orleans parish line. Joseph Dorignac III took over the business after his father passed. It is owned and currently being operated by the family,

== Goods and services ==
Dorignac's is a source of Creole cuisine and Cajun items such as Creole cream cheese, crawfish pie, frog legs, gumbo, catfish and olive salad, used to make muffuletta. The store also sells produce, meats, baked goods, party platters, and wedding cakes. Local staples include Cajun Crawtator potato chips from Zapp's, yogurt from Bittersweet Plantation Dairy, hot pickled okra, Louisiana pecans, Camellia brand red beans, Union coffee and chicory, as well as artichoke stalks to make a dish for Saint Joseph's Day. At Thanksgiving the store sells turducken.

Dorigniac's has a large bakery at the front of the store and offers King cakes. They also have a Kosher bakery, whose king cakes feature baby Moses.
