= Taffy (candy) =

Type of soft candy

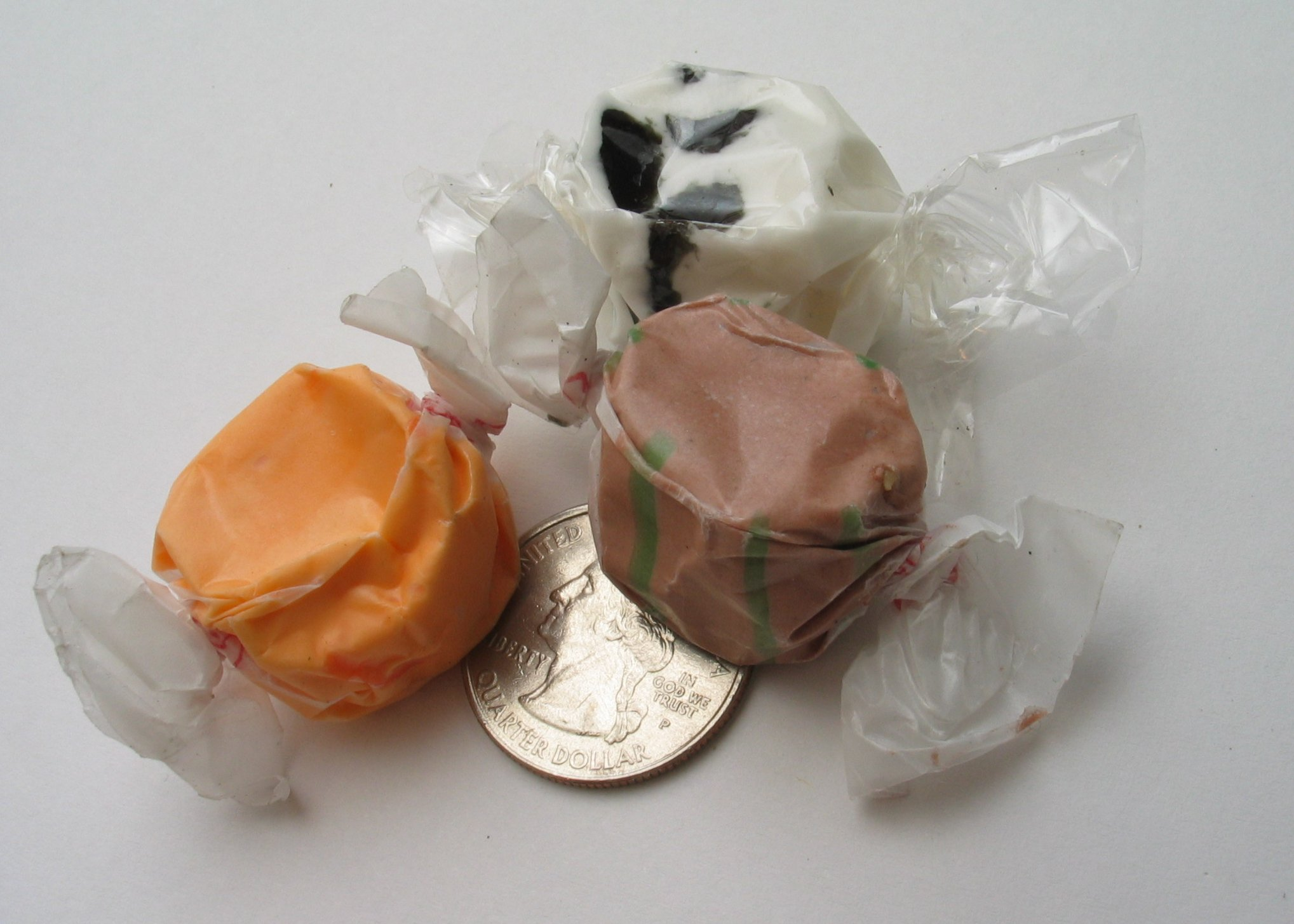
- Salt water taffy with a U.S. quarter for scale
- Alternative names: Salt water taffy
- Type: Candy
- Place of origin: United States
- Region or state: Atlantic City, New Jersey
- Main ingredients: sugar, corn starch, corn syrup, glycerine, water, butter, salt, flavoring, food coloring

Taffy is a type of candy invented in the United States, made by stretching or pulling a sticky mass of a soft candy base, made of boiled sugar, butter, vegetable oil, flavorings, and colorings, until it becomes aerated (tiny air bubbles produced), resulting in a light, fluffy and chewy candy. When this process is complete, the taffy is rolled, cut into small pieces and wrapped in wax paper to keep it soft. It is usually pastel-colored and fruit-flavored, but other flavors are common as well, including molasses and the "classic" (unflavored) taffy.

== Definition and etymology ==
The word taffy, referring to the boiled candy, is first known to have appeared in the United States circa 1817. The word is also used metaphorically to refer to insincere flattery.

The Oxford English Dictionary dates the first written record of the word toffee in the forms tuffy, toughy to 1825 and identifies it as a southern British dialectal variant of taffy (first recorded use in 1817), whose modern spelling is first recorded from 1843.

== Taffy pull ==
A taffy pull is a social event around the pulling of taffy that was popular in the 1840s through at least 1870s. The host would prepare the taffy recipe by melting molasses and sorghum or sugar with a mixture of water. Participants would coat their hands with butter and working with a partner pull the hot mixture apart, and then fold it back together and repeat. This process would add air to the candy, resulting in a soft chewable texture.

== United States ==
=== Salt water taffy ===
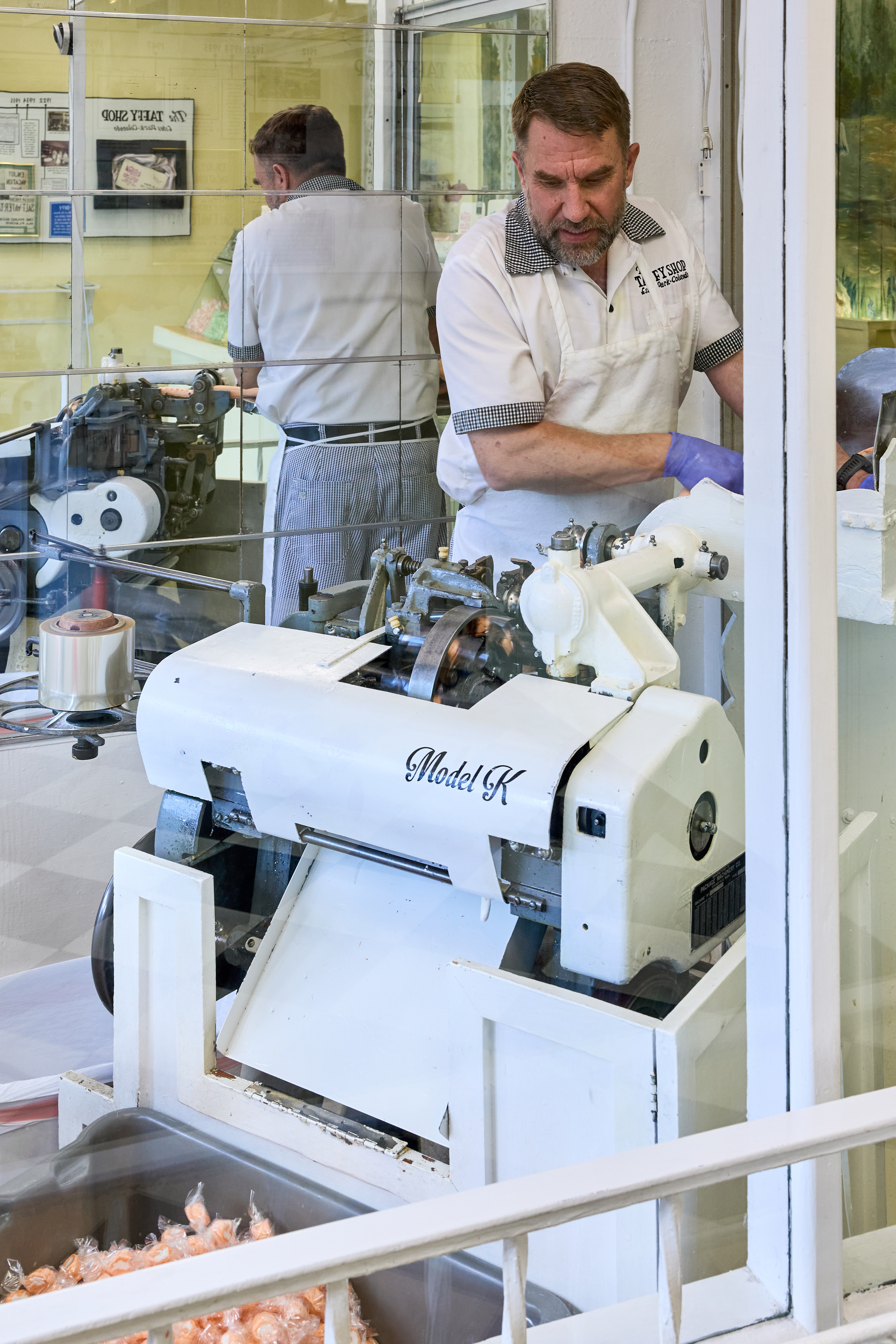
Salt water taffy production on an old Model K kiss-wrapping machine at the Taffy Shop (established in 1935) in Estes Park, Colorado

Salt water taffy is a variety of soft taffy originally produced and marketed in the Atlantic City area of the Jersey Shore starting in the 1880s. Its late 19th century appellation most likely originated in New Jersey. Salt water taffy is still sold widely on the boardwalks in Atlantic City (including shops in existence since the 19th century), nearby Ocean City, elsewhere at the Jersey Shore, and other beaches throughout the US like Cape Cod. It is also popular in Atlantic Canada and Salt Lake City, Utah.

Modern commercial taffy is made primarily from corn syrup, glycerin and butter. The pulling process, which makes the candy lighter and chewier, consists of stretching out the mixture, folding it over, and stretching it again. Although it is called "salt water" taffy, it does not include any seawater, though it does contain both salt and water.

The original invention of the candy has several different stories circulating, likely all apocryphal. One concerns an assistant who substituted seawater for fresh water—either through laziness or by accident. Another cites a storm which caused seawater to wash over the candy, which was consequently (and successfully) marketed with the appropriate name.

Joseph Fralinger popularized the candy by boxing it and selling it in Atlantic City. Fralinger's first major competition came from candy maker Enoch James, who refined the recipe, making it less sticky and easier to unwrap. James also cut the candy into bite-sized pieces and is credited with mechanizing the "pulling" process. The candy was also sold mail order; in 1926 sheet music was commissioned by James with the title "Send Home Some Taffy Today!" The Glaser family acquired James' stores in 1947, and Fralinger's stores in 1992. Stores under each brand still operate on the Atlantic City boardwalk.

On August 21, 1923, John Edmiston obtained a trademark for the name "salt water taffy" (number 172,016), then demanded royalties from companies using his newly acquired name. He was sued over this demand, and in 1925, the trademark was invalidated as being in common use.

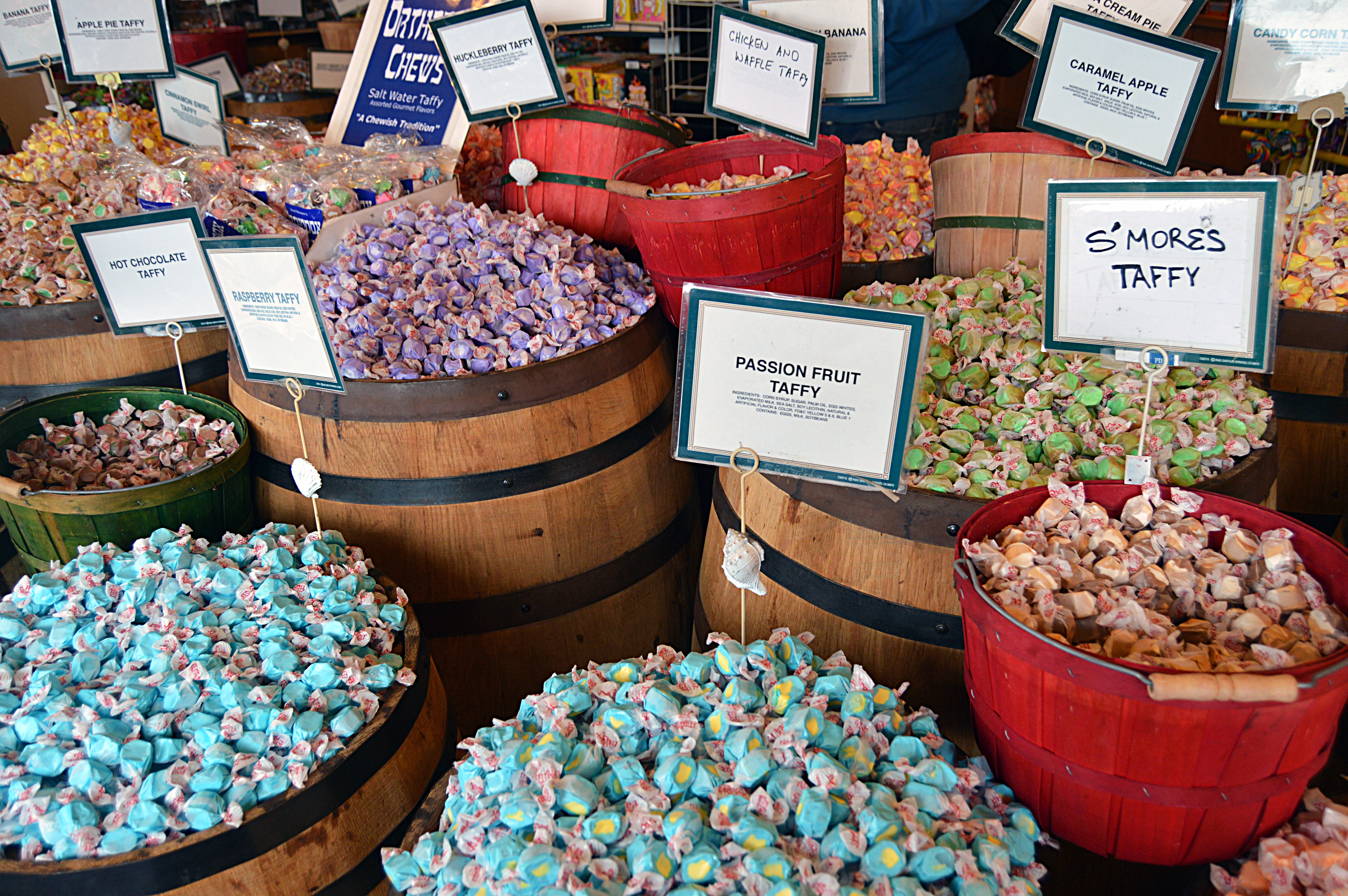
Taffy being sold in multiple flavors at Pier 39 in San Francisco

Caramel candies are sometimes referred to as taffy (taffy apples), but the caramel is very different from common salt water taffy, though they share a similar tensile quality.

==== Ingredients ====
Salt water taffy is composed of sugar, cornstarch, corn syrup, glycerine, water, butter, salt, natural or artificial flavor, and food color. Some examples of flavoring include vanilla, lemon, maple, banana, red licorice, watermelon, raspberry, or mint extracts.

== United Kingdom ==
In the United Kingdom, taffy pieces are known as "chewy sweets", "chews" or "fruit chews"—the term "taffy" is not used due to "taffy" being a slur against a Welsh person.

== Canada ==
In Canada, a form of molasses taffy candy, known as "halloween kisses", is produced in time for Halloween. The candy was first offered by the Kerr's Canadian candy company in the 1940s. At the time, a molasses candy was made by Stewart and Young in Glasgow.

== See also ==
- Kentucky cream candy
- List of candies
- List of regional dishes of the United States
