= Bittersweet Plantation Dairy =

Bittersweet Plantation Dairy was an artisanal dairy in Louisiana that produced award-winning cheeses, yogurts ice cream, and butter. It was started by Chef John Folse. Offerings included fromage triple creams, Bulgarian style Kashkaval, yogurt, various goat cheeses including feta, and Creole cream cheese.

== Product line ==
- Bayou Blue Louisiana Blue Cheese, a pasteurized cow's milk cheese aged one to two months, with a soft, deep blue rind and a creamy inside.
- Holy Cow - Vache Sante', a strong triple cream cow's milk cheese aged ten to twelve weeks. Recommended for bisques.
- Feliciana Nevat, a soft goat's milk cheese made to mimic Catalan Nevat from Spain. Feliciana means happy in Spanish and is the name of the Feliciana parishes, named by Don Bernando de Galvez, and Nevat is the Catalan word for snowed. According to the dairy, Nevat "refers to the powdery rind and mountain-like shape of the cheese".
- Chocolate Pecan Butter, a chocolate peanut butter

== Recognitions ==
Bittersweet Plantation Dairy was named one of the Top 10 United States dairies by Saveur Magazine in April 2005.
