= John Folse =

American chef, restaurant owner, and television host

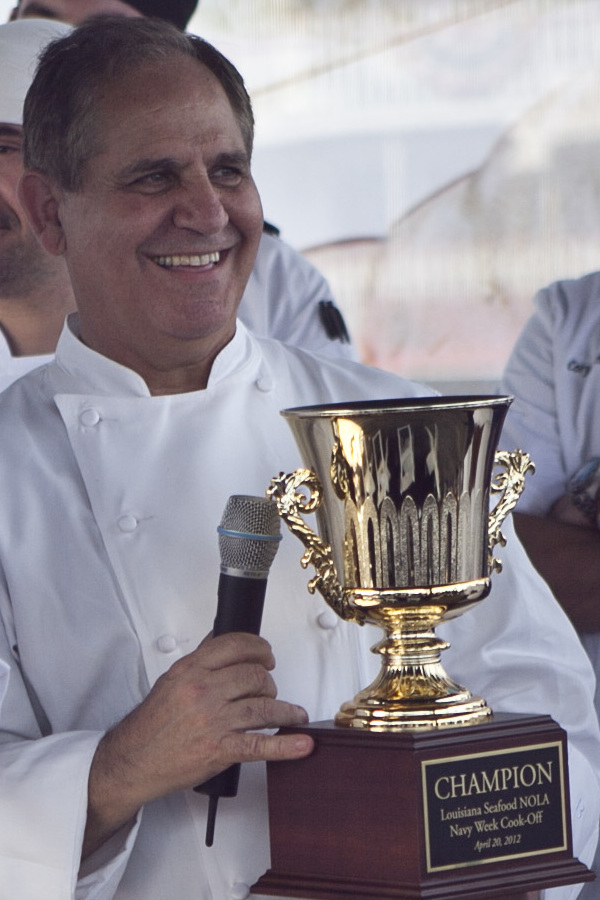
- John Folse presenting a Seafood Cook-Off trophy in 2012
- Born: John David Folse; July 9, 1946 (age 79); St. James Parish, Louisiana, U.S.
- Culinary career
- Cooking style: New Orleans, Louisiana, Cajun and Creole
- Current restaurants: 1978 Lafitte's Landing Restaurant, Donaldsonville, LA; 2012 Restaurant R'evolution, New Orleans, LA; 2019 Folse Market (New Orleans International Airport)
- Television show(s): A Taste of Louisiana, PBS
- Website: jfolse.com

John David Folse (born July 9, 1946) is an American chef, restaurant owner, and television host. A lifelong resident of Louisiana, he is seen as a leading authority on Cajun and Creole cuisine and culture.

== Early life ==
Folse was born on July 9, 1946, in St. James Parish, Louisiana, on the German Coast of the Mississippi River.

== Restaurants and other ventures ==
In 1978, Folse opened Lafitte's Landing Restaurant in the historic Viala Plantation House near Donaldsonville in St. James Parish south of Baton Rouge.

In 2002, Bittersweet Plantation Dairy opened, and offers a full line of fresh and aged cheeses, butters, yogurts and ice cream.

In November 2019, Folse opened Folse Market in the state-of-the-art New Orleans International Airport. As the anchor restaurant of Concourse C, Folse Market serves a traditional taste of New Orleans cuisine to travelers.

== TV and radio ==
Chef Folse has for many years hosted a culinary radio show on Saturdays called "Stirrin' It Up!" The show is broadcast on many stations throughout the state of Louisiana, chiefly WBRP TALK 107.3 FM, Baton Rouge. The show is usually co-hosted by Michaela D. York, his director of communications and marketing.

The TV version of Stirrin' It Up is broadcast during the afternoon news hour on WAFB TV, Baton Rouge. WAFB and Folse partnered to create a Stirrin' It Up app containing episodes and recipes, available through the iTunes store.

Folse previously served as the marketing specialist on the Louisiana Seafood Promotion & Marketing Board. He is a member of Chaines des Rotisseurs, and the Sister Dulce Foundation Board.

== Bibliography ==
Folse is the author of:

- The Evolution of Cajun & Creole Cuisine (1989)
- Chef John Folse's Plantation Celebrations (1994), a cookbook focusing on recipes whose origins can be traced to Louisiana plantations along the Mississippi River
- Louisiana Sampler (1996), a collection of recipes from Louisiana Fairs & Festivals
- Hot Beignets & Warm Boudoirs (1999), a guide to Louisiana bed-and-breakfast inns and their recipes
- The Encyclopedia of Cajun & Creole Cuisine (2004)
- After the Hunt-Louisiana's Authoritative Collection of Wild Game & Game Fish Cookery (2007)

Folse also co-authored:

- Something Old & Something New-Louisiana Cooking With A Change of Heart (1997), with Craig M. Walker, a cookbook of healthy versions of traditional Cajun and Creole cuisine
- Hooks, Lies & Alibis-Louisiana's Authoritative Collection of Game Fish & Seafood Cookery (2009) with co-author Michaela D. York.
- Can You Dig It-Louisiana's Authoritative Collection of Vegetable Cookery (2015) with co-author Michaela D. York.
