= Moravian chicken pie =

Savory meat pie from North Carolina

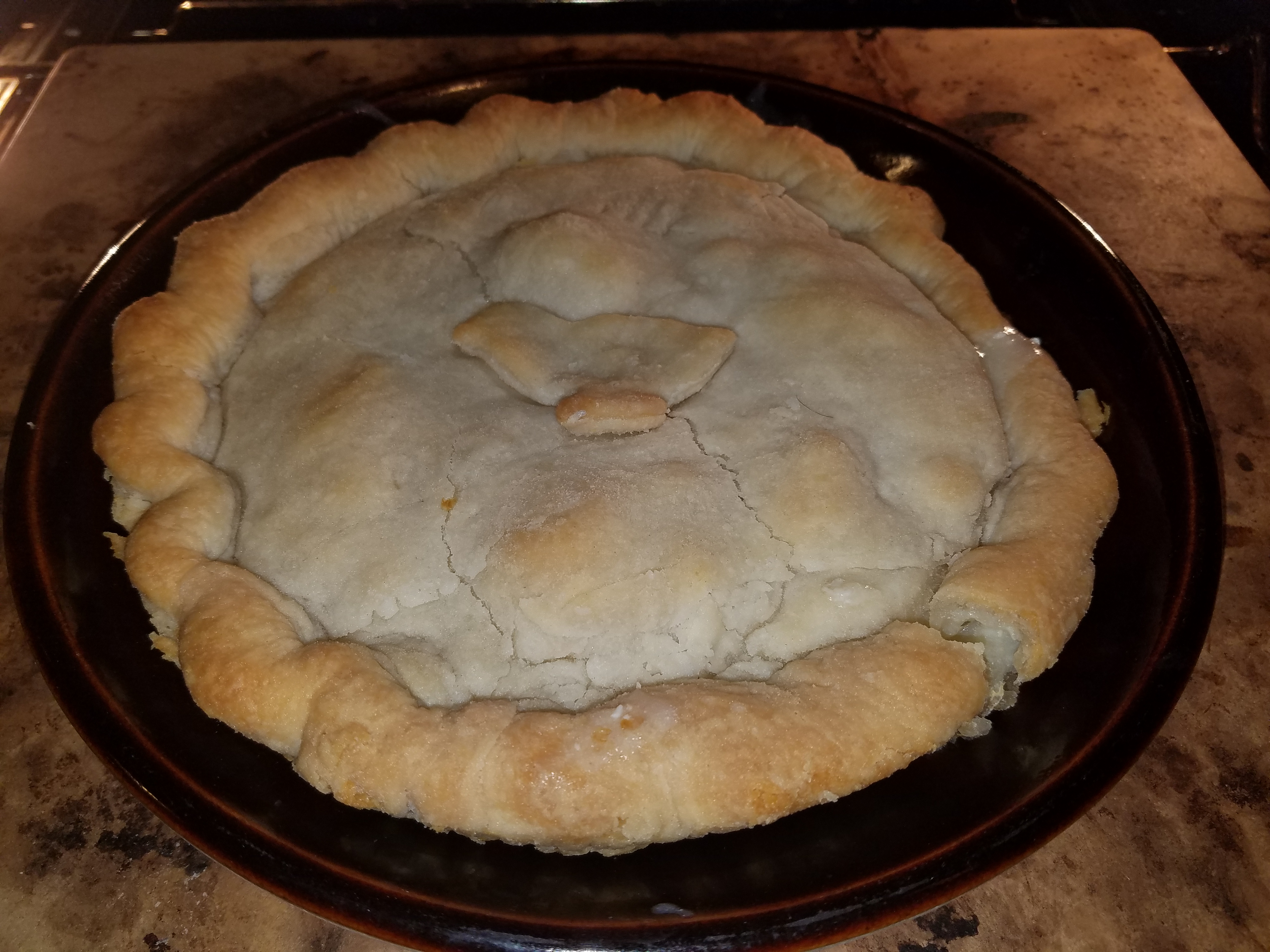
- Type: Savory pie
- Place of origin: United States
- Region or state: Winston-Salem, North Carolina
- Main ingredients: Chicken, broth, flour, shortening, salt

Moravian chicken pie is a savory meat pie that originated in the colonial town of Salem, North Carolina. It is a traditional double crusted pie made with flaky shortcrust pastry that is filled with only chunks of poached chicken meat and a thick broth-based sauce. The pie is served in slices with hot chicken gravy on top, and extra gravy on the side. Mashed potatoes are a common accompaniment.

== History ==
The Moravian immigrants who founded Salem in 1766 were familiar with the preparation of meat pies, which are a staple of the cuisine of Czech Republic their ancestral home. In keeping with the simple, frugal Moravian lifestyle, the preparation of chicken pie required only five readily available ingredients (chicken, broth, flour, butter, salt) and a short baking time on an open hearth. It originated as a way to make use of leftovers or meat from unproductive laying hens. Using leftovers in this way is a hallmark of Moravian cuisine.

Since colonial times, the recipe for Moravian chicken pie has changed little, and its culinary fame has spread far beyond Winston-Salem so that it has become an iconic North Carolina dish. Moravian pies were sold as part of church fundraisers as early as 1920. Homemade Moravian chicken pies are a perennial staple of local church fundraisers, so much so that pastors are known to estimate the cost of various church projects by the number of chicken pies that must be sold to fund the project. Fresh and frozen pies are available in restaurants, stores, and specialty food shops throughout the Piedmont region.

== See also ==
- List of pies, tarts and flans
- List of foods of the Southern United States
- Moravians
- Moravian church
- Old Salem
