= Kentucky jam cake =

American dessert

- Type: Cake
- Course: Dessert
- Place of origin: United States
- Region or state: Kentucky
- Main ingredients: Jam, spices, caramel icing

Kentucky jam cake is a traditional dessert originating in the United States state of Kentucky and also associated with Tennessee. The cake has jam and spices mixed in the batter and is decorated with caramel icing.

== See also ==
- List of regional dishes of the United States
- List of foods of the Southern United States
