= Millionaire pie =

American dessert

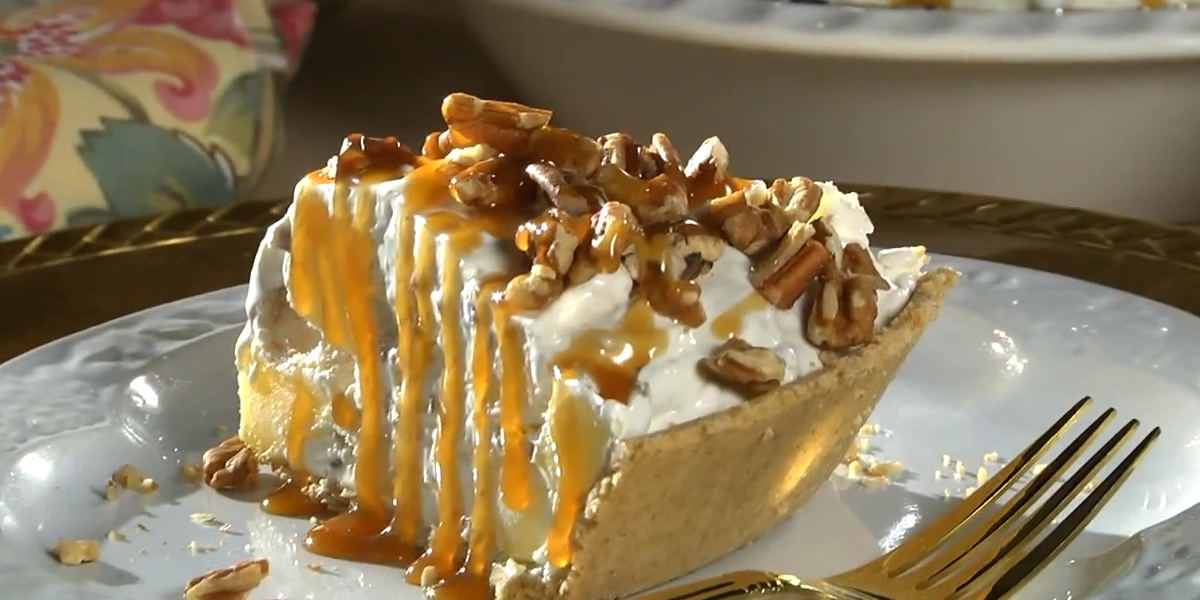
- Alternative names: Million dollar pie, millionaire’s pie
- Type: Dessert
- Place of origin: United States
- Region or state: Southern United States, Southwestern United States
- Main ingredients: Crust, whipped cream, pineapple, pecans
- Variations: Million dollar pie, Billion dollar pie, Hawaiian millionaire pie, Billionaire pie

Millionaire pie is an American icebox pie. This pie is a dish popular in the Southern United States, Texas, and New Mexico. It is made of whipped cream or whipped topping, crushed pineapple, and chopped pecans with a graham cracker crust, although the ingredients are modifiable. Some versions include condensed milk, cream cheese, flaked coconut, and/or cherry pie filling or maraschino cherries. However, the whipped topping or whipped cream, pineapple, and crust are essential ingredients, although the type of crust (e.g. graham cracker, shortbread) can vary.

This is a type of icebox pie, which became popular between 1930 and 1950 with the adoption of refrigerators in the United States.

The pie and variations of it are sometimes referred to as billionaire's pie, billion dollar pie, million dollar pie, or Hawaiian million dollar pie.

Furr's Cafeteria and Luby's both featured the dessert on their menu.

== See also ==
- List of pies, tarts and flans
- List of foods of the Southern United States
