= Kentucky cream candy =

Confection from Kentucky, US

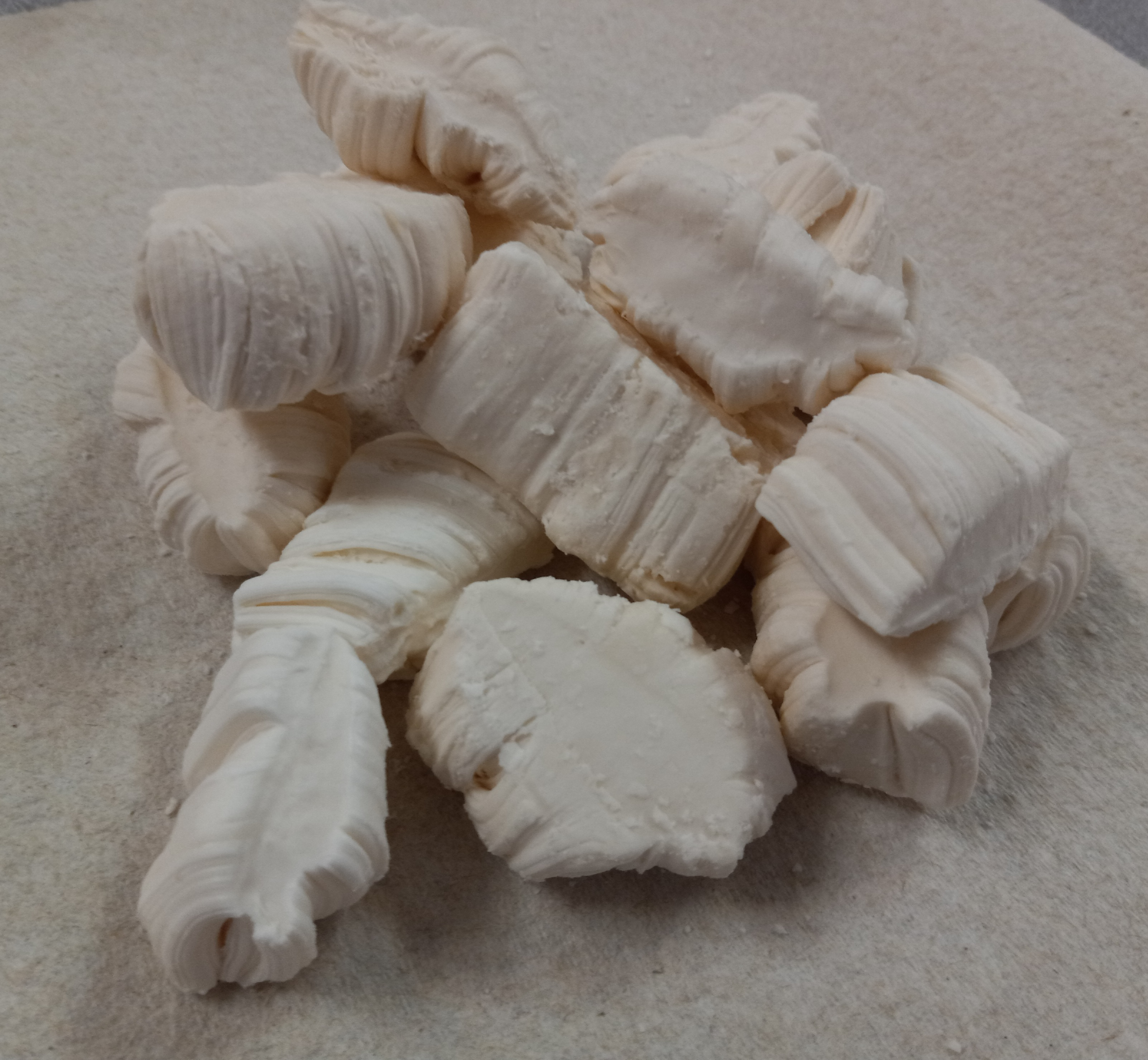
- Kentucky cream candy
- Type: Confectionery
- Main ingredients: Cream

Kentucky cream candy, or Kentucky pulled or pull cream candy, is a Southern pulled candy from the US state of Kentucky that shares some similarities with taffy. Kentucky cream candy is usually pulled in cold weather and is made with cream, sugar, and water. It was created by Ruth Hanly Booe and Rebecca Gooch, who were both substitute teachers from Louisville, Kentucky that opened their own business named "Rebecca Ruth Candies" in Frankfort, Kentucky. Ruth Hunt from Mt. Sterling, Kentucky also started making the candy in her basement in 1921.
