= Divinity (confectionery) =

Nougat-like confection

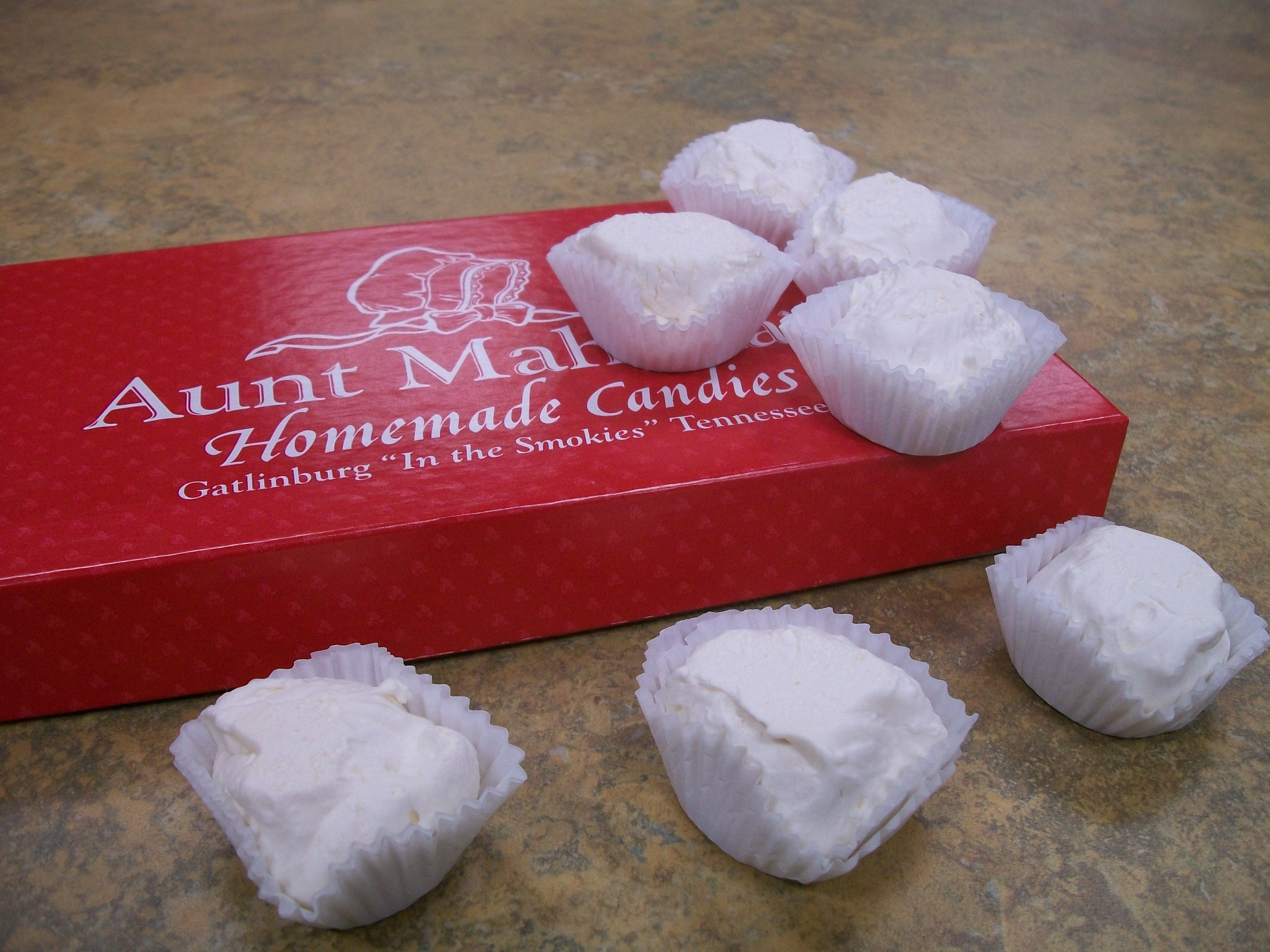
- Type: Confection
- Main ingredients: Egg whites, corn syrup, and sugar or brown sugar

Divinity is a nougat-like confection made with whipped egg white, corn syrup, and sugar. Optional ingredients such as flavors, chopped dried fruit and chopped nuts are frequently added. Replacing the sugar with brown sugar results in a related confection called "sea foam".

== History ==
Believed to have originated in the U.S. during the early 1900s, the candy's current form can be traced to a recipe from 1915. An earlier version, which included the use of milk, can be traced to around 1907.

One proposed theory for its origins is that in the early 20th century, corn syrup (a major ingredient) became commonly used as a popular sugar substitute. New recipes incorporating corn syrup were frequently created by the major manufacturers, one of which may have been divinity.

The origins of the name are not clear. The most popular theory is simply that the first person to taste it called it "divine" and the name stuck.

Divinity has at times been referred to as a "Southern candy", most likely because of the frequent use of pecans in the recipe. It eventually made its way north, and today its recipe can be found in many cookbooks.

== In popular culture ==
- In the Peanuts comic strip in the 1960s, Linus Van Pelt was shown to be fond of divinity, even being willing to compliment his sister Lucy Van Pelt to receive a piece.
- The B-52's song "Give Me Back My Man" features the line "Throws divinity on the sand", as the narrator's attempt to entice a hungry shark into sparing her sweetheart's life in exchange for the candy. This explanation is provided by Cindy Wilson in the book The B-52's Universe by Mats Sexton. The band, being from Athens, Georgia, would be familiar with this Southern candy.
- In the 1985 American romantic drama film Perfect, starring John Travolta and Jamie Lee Curtis, Curtis's character's mother talks about making the world's best divinity, offering some to Travolta.
- In Winston Groom's 1986 novel Forrest Gump, a woman boarding with Forrest and his mother uses divinity to lure Forrest into his first sexual encounter. This scene is not included in the 1994 film adaptation.
- In the 2006 film Charlotte's Web, the town pastor offers the Arables divinities when they come to him about Charlotte's first "miraculous" web writing.

== See also ==
- Marshmallow
- Meringue
