= Confederate cush =

Cornmeal hash

Cush
- Alternative names: slosh, coosh, kush, cornmeal hash
- Type: hash, hotcake or stew
- Course: Main course / Side dish
- Place of origin: United States
- Region or state: Southern United States
- Created by: Unknown
- Invented: c. 19th century
- Cooking time: 10 minutes
- Serving temperature: Warm
- Main ingredients: salt pork, bacon, cornmeal mush, cubed beef
- Ingredients generally used: grease, water, garlic
- Variations: meatless

Cush is a dish that became popular following the Slave Trade. It is also known as cornmeal hash.

== Origin ==
The dish likely originated in the southern United States sometime shortly after the start of the American Civil War. The name is likely derived from the Cajun dish couche-couche (fried cornmeal mush).

== Popularity ==
The dish became popular during the American Civil War among the Confederate Army, due to the minimal amount of preparation needed to prepare it and the few ingredients required.

== Preparation ==
A Confederate soldier gave this recipe for cush: "We take some bacon & fry the grease out, then we cut some cold beef in small pieces and put it in the grease, then pour in water and stew it like mash. Then we crumble corn bread or biscuit in it and stew it again till all the water is out. Then we have real Confederate cush."

Though it was usually served with the water cooked out, in the form of hash, sometimes it was served as a stew, with flour as a substitute for the cornmeal. When corn pone went sour, it was often used in place of cornmeal.
