= Monroe Sausage =

- Type: Private
- Industry: Food processing
- Founded: 1959; 67 years ago
- Website: monroesausage.com

Monroe Sausage
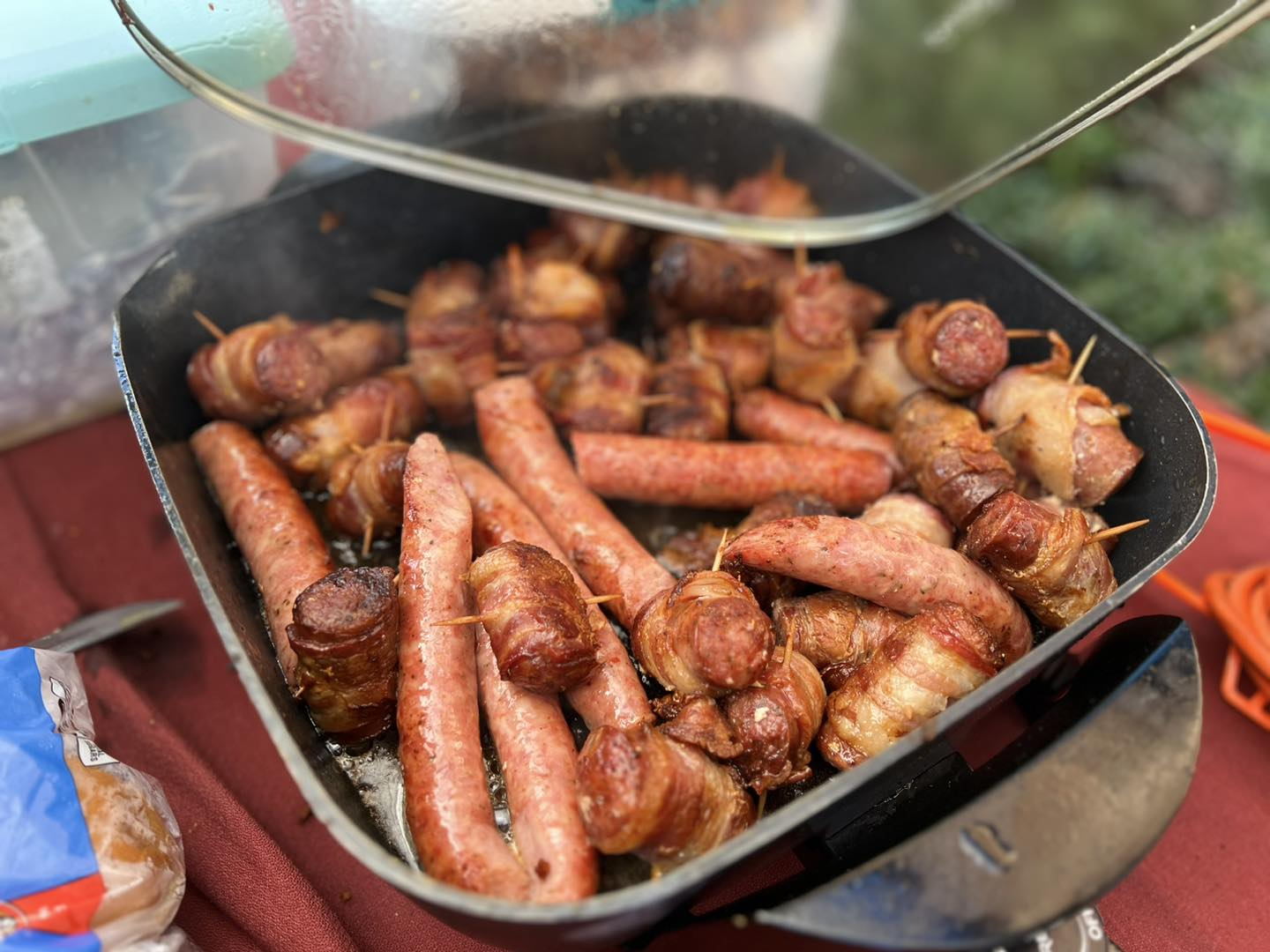
- Monroe sausage cooked in a pan.
- Type: Sausage
- Place of origin: Monroeville, Alabama
- Associated cuisine: Cuisine of the Southern United States
- Main ingredients: Ground pork

Monroe Sausage is an American brand of hickory-smoked pork sausage created in Monroe County, Alabama. It is produced using natural casings.

== History ==
Monroe sausage was created in the early 1940s when an unknown family started Monroe Meats and Cold Storage. The sausage gained local fame in the late 1940s by being used in sausage biscuits during the annual Monroeville Hog Festival. However, the facility that produced Monroe Sausage was destroyed by Hurricane Ivan in 2004, leading to its closure. In 2007, a group of investors reopened the plant in Beatrice, Alabama.
