= Creole cream cheese =

Form of cheese traditional to New Orleans, Louisiana

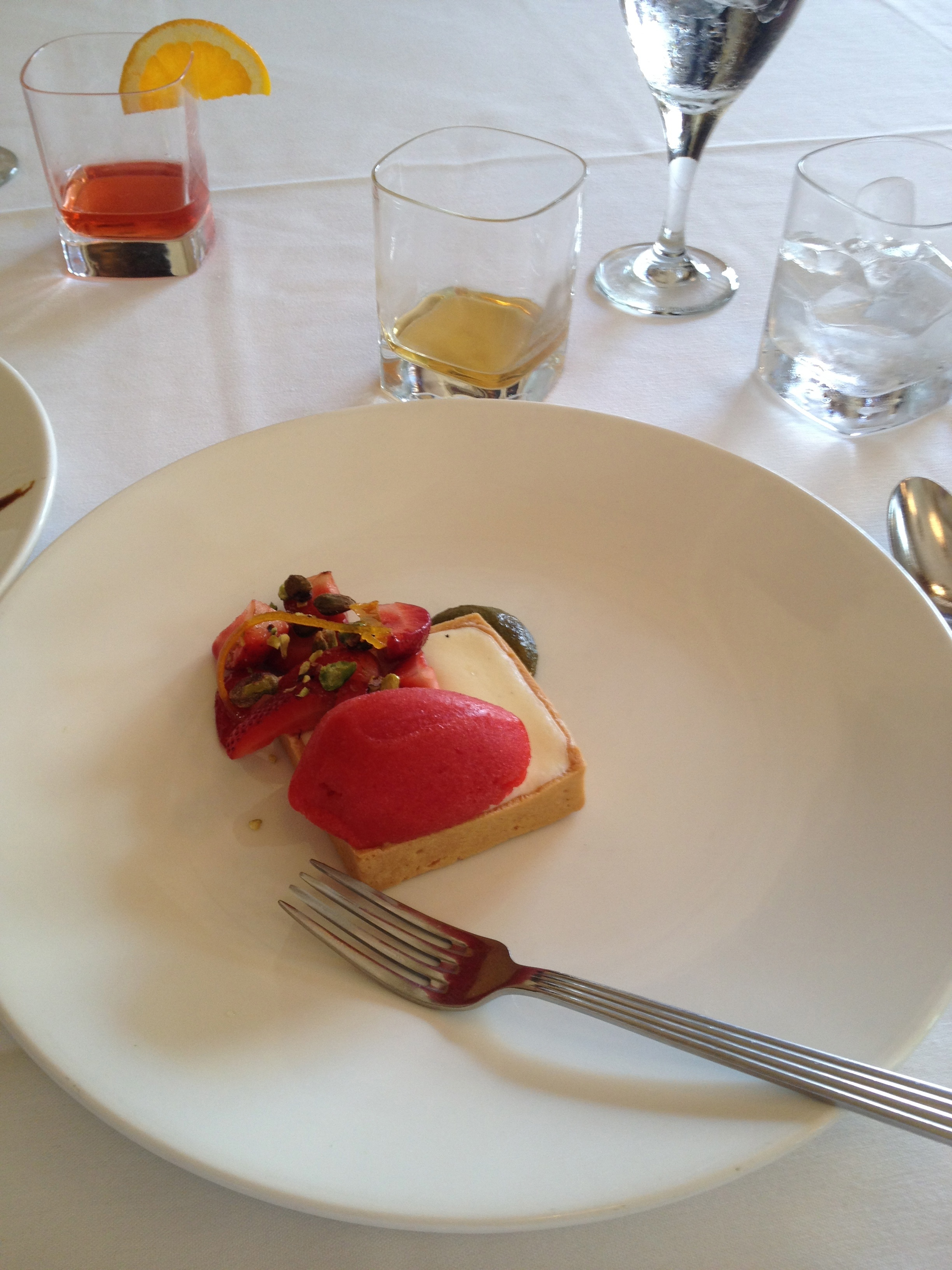
- Creole cream cheese tart topped with strawberry sorbet
- Type: Farmer cheese
- Course: Breakfast
- Place of origin: United States
- Region or state: New Orleans
- Invented: 1800s
- Main ingredients: Skim milk, buttermilk and rennet

Creole cream cheese is a form of farmer cheese that is traditional in the New Orleans area of Louisiana in the United States. It is made from skim milk, buttermilk and rennet, has a mild, slightly tart, slightly sweet taste, and is frequently mixed with cream, sugar and fruit and served as a dessert. It is often used to make Creole cream cheese ice cream.

In homes it was traditionally eaten for breakfast and served with cream, fruit, or sugar; it can also be served on toast with butter, salt and pepper.

== History ==
According to Mauthe of Mauthe's Progress Milk Barn, an artisan dairy credited with helping resurrect the dish, Creole cream cheese originated in the 1800s among people of French ancestry. Instead of forming the curds, they are said to have hung the clabber in a mesh bag in a tree and let the whey drain off.

Creole cream cheese was served in a bowl and cream was poured over it. Mouthe remembers it being eaten on French bread in some areas and on cornbread in other parts of the Southern United States.

Creole cream cheese is listed in the Ark of Taste, an international catalog of heritage foods in danger of extinction, maintained by the global Slow Food movement.

Creole cream cheese's popularity declined during the second half of the 20th century and it became difficult to find. Several dairies in South Louisiana have offered creole cream cheese in the past, including Borden's, Gold Seal and Barbe's. In 1998 it was still available at Dorignac's Food Center on Veterans Boulevard in Metairie. The Gold Seal Creamery that was the last Creole cream cheese factory in New Orleans operated from about 1920 to 1986 and its blond-brick building constructed in 1954 is being converted into loft apartments.

== Resurgence ==
More recently, creole cream cheese has had a resurgence. New Orleans native chef David Guas offers creole cream cheese at his Bayou Bakery, Coffee Bar & Eatery in Arlington, Virginia, served with buttermilk biscuits and pepper jelly. The New Orleans Museum of Art (NOMA) included creole cream cheese as part of its 2012 "Art You Can Eat" demonstrations, with Leah Chase making it. Poppy Tooker has also been credited with helping revive the dish. The Encyclopedia of Cajun and Creole Cuisine includes instructions on making the dish at home.

The intensive process required to make creole cream cheese, a yogurt-like and slightly sweet concoction, has made a comeback including with a cheesecake recipe from the Mauthe (pronounced: /ˈmoʊ.teɪ/; MOH-tay) family of McComb, Mississippi, who operate the Progress Milk Barn, nearly destroyed by Hurricane Katrina.

== Ice cream ==
Creole cream cheese ice cream is also a Louisiana tradition. The USDA cracked down on dairies over concerns about spoilage and added regulations over milk and cheese production; production has become far more limited. The ice cream flavor was available at K&B drugstores. Other past producers include Brown's Dairy (formerly Brown's Velvet Dairy) in New Orleans.

John Besh offers a creole cream cheese red velvet ice cream at his Soda Shop in the National World War II Museum. Mam's House of Ice in Houston offers Creole Cream Cheese ice cream. Baskin Robbins offered the flavor in 2011/2012. In April 2013, Blue Bell Creameries re-released the flavor in Louisiana and the Mississippi Gulf Coast region, and in 2018 released the flavor again in the Pine Belt area of Mississippi, most notably in the Ramey's supermarket chain. Another version is made by New Orleans Ice Cream Company.

== See also ==
- List of spreads
