= James Pepper =

James Pepper may refer to:

- Jim Pepper (1941–1992), Kaw Nation and American jazz saxophonist, composer, and singer
- James Auburn Pepper (1915–1985), farmer and political figure in Saskatchewan
- James Pepper, cowboy involved in New Mexico's Lincoln County War as an ally of John Chisum
- James E. Pepper, American whiskey brand
