= Henry Bain sauce =

American condiment for meats

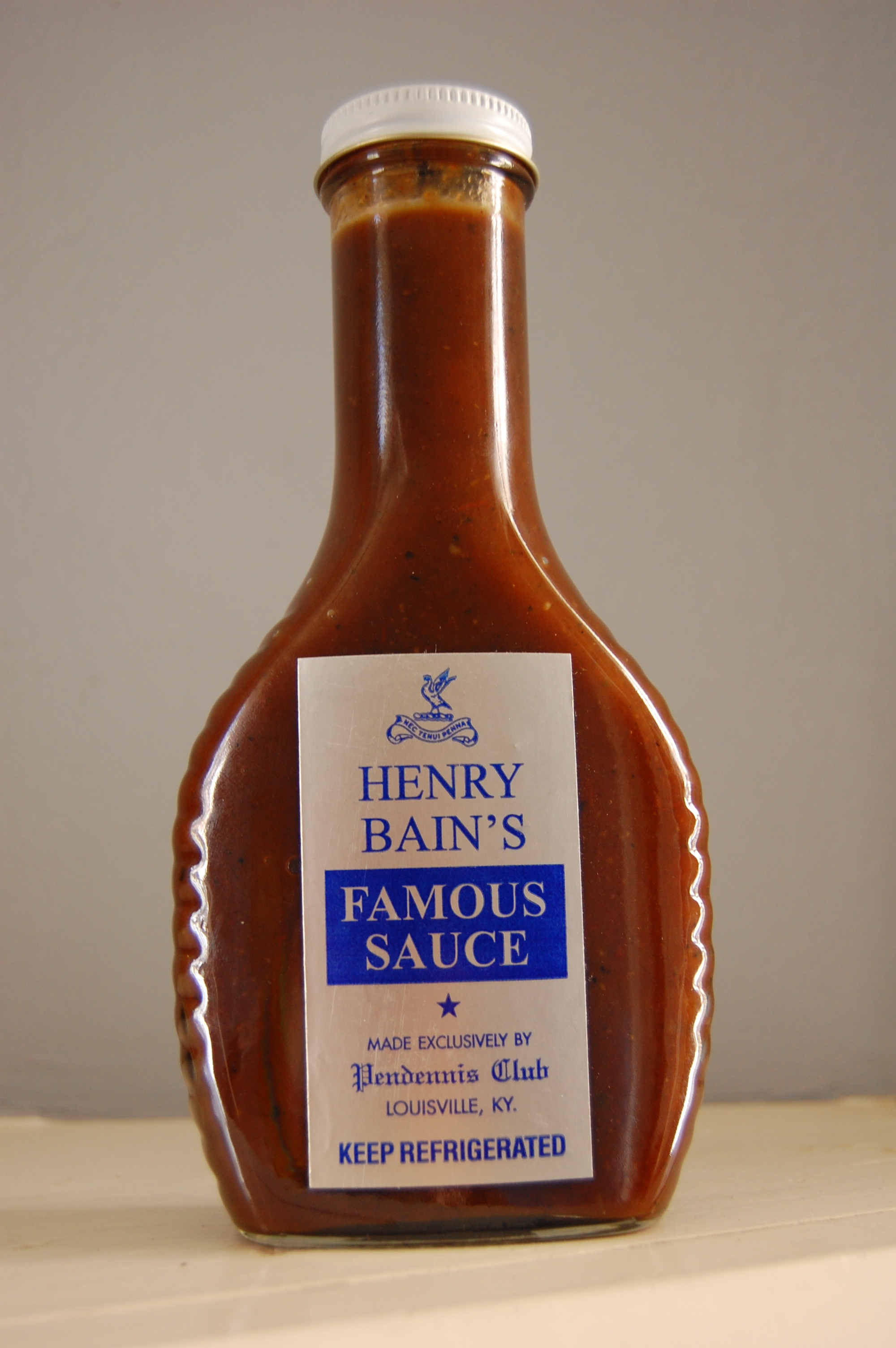
- Henry Bain sauce
- Place of origin: Louisville, United States
- Region or state: Bluegrass region
- Created by: Henry Bain

Henry Bain sauce is a condiment for meats, first served at the Pendennis Club in Louisville, Kentucky.

== History ==
Henry Bain (1863–1928) was one of the first employees and eventually a head waiter at the Pendennis Club, which was founded in 1881. He is credited with creating his namesake sauce for steaks and the local game animals brought in by members for preparation.

Numerous recipes for homemade versions have circulated for years and are still widely used. In 2009, the club began bottling and selling the original version. As demand increased, the club partnered with a local food distribution company to sell the sauce at local stores and Kroger supermarkets in the Louisville area and online.

== See also ==
- Cuisine of Kentucky
- History of Louisville, Kentucky

== General and cited references ==
- Louisville Convention and Visitors Bureau 2003 Press Kit
