= Grawemeyer Hall =

Building located on the Belknap Campus of the University of Louisville

- U.S. National Register of Historic Places
- U.S. National Historic Landmark
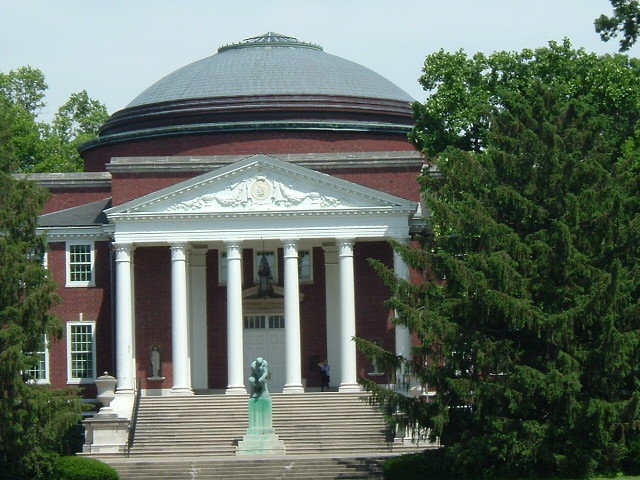

- Location within Kentucky Location within the United States
- Location: Louisville, Kentucky
- Coordinates: 38.215113°N 85.760168°W
- Built: 1926
- Architect: Allied Architects of Kentucky
- Architectural style: Early Republic, Neoclassical
- Part of: University of Louisville Campus
- NRHP reference No.: 76000908
- Added to NRHP: June 25, 1976

Grawemeyer Hall is a building located on the Belknap Campus (main campus) of the University of Louisville in Louisville, Kentucky. The building was modeled after Thomas Jefferson's Rotunda on the grounds of the University of Virginia. Named for Charles Grawemeyer, a major benefactor to the university, the building now houses mostly administrative offices including the office of the university's president.

The building was designed by the Allied Architects of Kentucky, a consortium of architects. Consortium members Frederic L. Morgan and Arthur G. Tafel were chiefly responsible for the design.

On the steps of the building rests one of the original castings of Auguste Rodin's The Thinker. This casting is one of the few originals in the United States and the only one in the American South.

Inside, under the dome of the Rotunda, a Foucault Pendulum extends 72 feet to the lower level. It was added to the building during renovation in 1977 and has been in operation nearly continuously since then.
