= Modjeska (confection) =

Marshmallow dipped in caramel

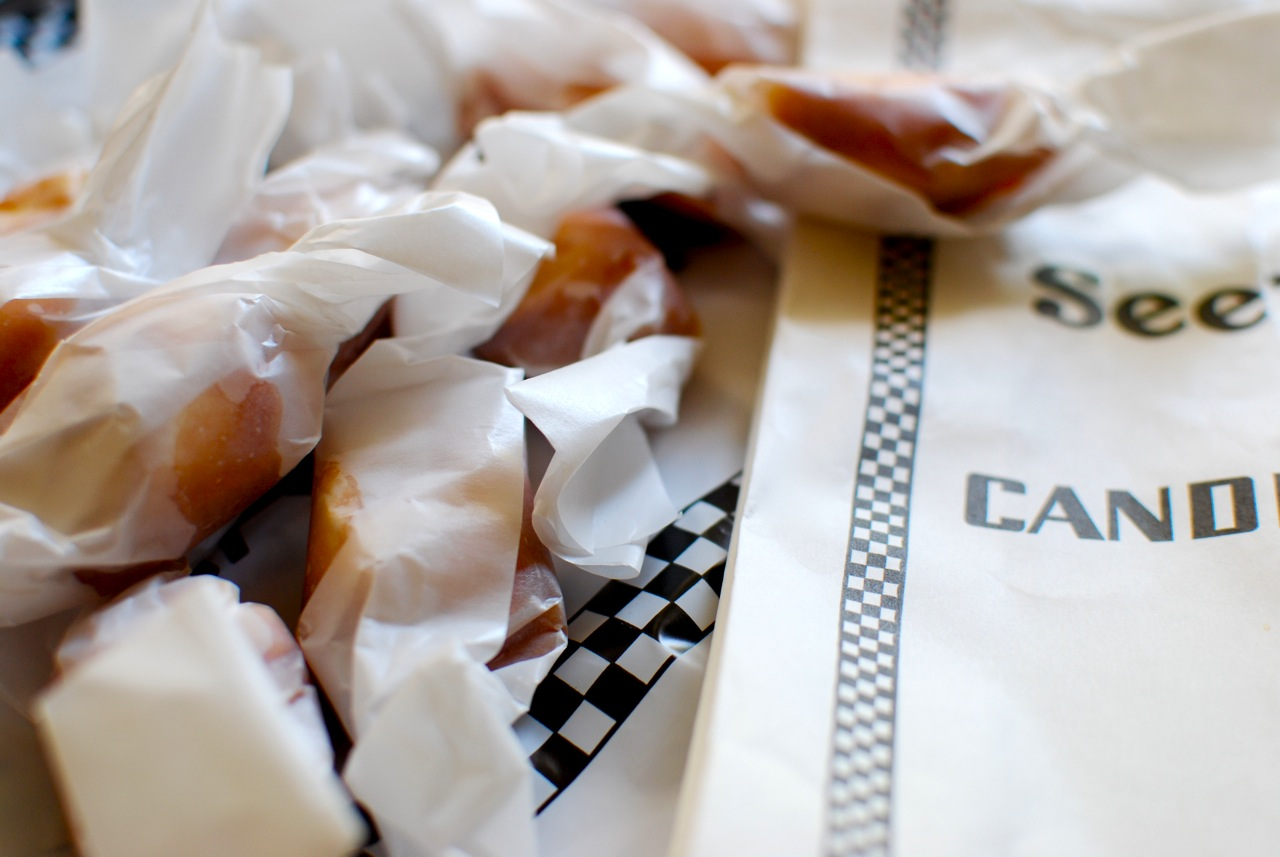
- Scotch Kisses, a variation of the Modjeska, made by See's Candies
- Place of origin: Louisville, Kentucky, US
- Region or state: Bluegrass region
- Created by: Anton Busath
- Main ingredients: marshmallow dipped in caramel

A Modjeska is a confection consisting of marshmallow dipped in caramel. It was created in the 1880s in Louisville, Kentucky by confectioner Anton Busath to honor Shakespearean actress Helena Modjeska, who was performing there in the US debut production of Ibsen's A Doll's House. After Modjeska granted Busath permission to use her name for the candy, she sent him an autographed portrait, which he hung in his shop. Other Louisville shops began to make versions of the candy, which continues to be popular in the region today; in particular, Bauer's Candies in Lawrenceburg, Kentucky renamed their own "caramel biscuit" the Modjeska in tribute to Busath after his family's store was destroyed by a fire. Muth's Candies and Dundee Candy in Louisville, and Schimpff's Confectionery in Jeffersonville, Indiana, in the Louisville metropolitan area, also sell the candy.

== See also ==
- Kentucky cuisine
- History of Louisville, Kentucky
