= Charles Grawemeyer =

US businessman and philanthropist

Henry Charles Grawemeyer (September 3, 1912 – December 8, 1993), industrialist, entrepreneur, astute investor and philanthropist, created the Grawemeyer Award at the University of Louisville in 1984. An initial endowment of $9 million from the Grawemeyer Foundation funded the awards, which have drawn thousands of nominations from around the world.

Grawemeyer Hall on the campus of the University of Louisville is named in honor of his family.

== Sources ==
- Kleber, John E. (2015). The Encyclopedia of Louisville. University Press of Kentucky. pp. 351–352. ISBN 9780813149745. "Grawemeyer, Henry Charles"
