= International Bar-B-Q Festival =

Food festival in Owensboro, Kentucky

Coordinates: 37°46′34″N 87°06′56″W

BBQ and Barrels, previously known as the International Barb-B-Q Festival, is an event held in Owensboro, Kentucky, every second weekend in May. Locals and tourists come together to celebrate barbecue and bourbon, two important staples in the Owensboro area. The event offers a variety of activities consisting of a barbecue cook-off, bourbon tasting, food trucks, carnival rides, car shows, road races, live music, games, arts and crafts, pageants, eating competitions, and raffles. The tradition has occurred annually since 1979, making it 45 years old.

== History ==
Owensboro's first International Barb-B-Q Festival occurred in 1979. The tradition started out as nothing more than a barbecue cooking competition. Festival attendees partake in tasting the food prepared by the cooking teams. Each team was associated with a local church. They competed to win the Governor's Cup. Best chicken, best mutton, and best burgoo are other titles that were granted.

Mutton cooking is a particular delicacy in Owensboro. This began with early Welsh settlements in the area. Sheep were heavily relied on for their wool. Once they became mature and stopped wool production, farmers harvested them for their meat. Early German Catholic populations in Daviess County brought the tradition of burgoo.

For the 2018 event, it was estimated that 80,000 people would attend and 10 tons of mutton and 5,000 chickens would be cooked. 1,500 gallons of burgoo was also expected to be prepared. Burgoo is a soup consisting of mutton and vegetables in addition to other ingredients chosen by the cook, making each recipe unique.

In 2020, the festival encountered a hindrance. Due to the pandemic, the event could not take place in its traditional manner. To avoid a complete halt, the Drive-Thru Festival was created. On the weekend the event was planned to be held, free barbecue was distributed by organizers. When restrictions on gatherings were lifted in 2022, the International Barb-B-Q Festival returned with a new title: The Barb-B-Q Block Party. No new changes to the event's activities came along with the name alteration.

2023 brought the biggest change for the festival. Organizers decided to incorporate bourbon, another western Kentucky historical element. The event became a celebration of both barbecue and bourbon with the new title BBQ and Barrels. Along with the barbecue cooking teams and vendors, 35 distilleries participated and offered their product for festival goers to taste.

== Activities ==
BBQ and Barrels has accumulated a wide variety of activities for attendees to participate in over the years. The one that has been there since the beginning is the cook-off. The Backyard BBQ Cook-Off consists of church teams and local vendors competing for overall first place, best chicken, best pork, or best beef. The overall grand champion of the cook-off receives $1,500, a first-place trophy, a traveling trophy, and a waiver for the next year's cook-off entry fee.

Bourbon tasting was added to the list of activities when the 2023 rebrand occurred. Attendees purchase tickets for the bourbon portion of the event to have access to all the distillery vendors. Companion passes can also be purchased for those who want to simply view the alcohol or dive into the history. The passes are also useful for those planning to be a designated driver to someone participating in the drinking.

A 50-50 raffle was also introduced with the transition to BBQ and Barrels. Tickets could be bought online or at booths at the event. 3 tickets could be purchased for $10, 20 for $20, 60 for $40, and 180 for $100. The winner of the raffle receives half of the prize money, and the half that it left is kept by the festival organizers to fund future events.

The 2024 BBQ and Barrels event held a car show and road race where attendees could view many unique, classic vehicles. Less than 100 vehicles could be entered, while one wins a custom bourbon barrel lid. The show was invitational only. People who wished to participate were required to send in an email with photos and descriptions of the vehicle they wanted to enter.

== See also ==
- Cuisine of Kentucky
