= Pendennis Club =

Private social club in downtown Louisville, KY

The Pendennis Club
- Type: Private club
- Founded: 1881; 145 years ago
- Headquarters: 218 W. Muhammad Ali Blvd., Louisville, Kentucky 40202
- Website: www.pendennisclub.org

The Pendennis Club is a private social club located at 218 West Muhammad Ali Boulevard (formerly Walnut Street) in Louisville, Kentucky. It originated as a gentlemen's "city" club on the model of the clubs in London, Britain, of which White's Club founded in 1693 is the progenitor. The Pendennis Club has long been regarded as the preeminent social club in Kentucky and one of the premier clubs in the United States.

The club is governed by laws under 501(c)(7) Social and Recreation Clubs; in 2024 it claimed revenue of $2,240,853 and total assets of $1,550,616. The Pendennis Historical Foundation is a 501(c)(3) Public Charity; in 2010 it claimed $15,605 in total revenue and $40,357 in total assets.

== Founding ==
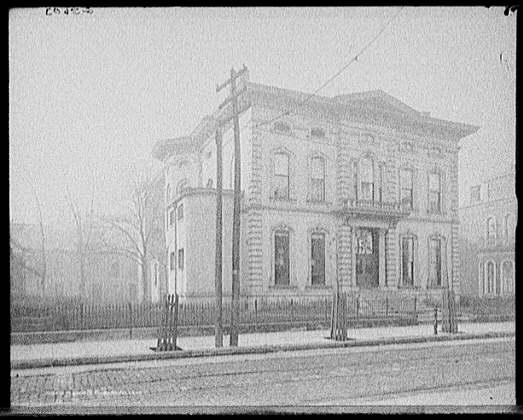
The original clubhouse, c. 1906

The Pendennis Club was founded by Thomas Wilson Todd (1852–1892), Levi Bloom (1854–1944), John Smith Noyes (1842–1922), and William Whits Hite (1854–1908) who, with sixteen others, hosted a preliminary meeting for starting the club in Mr. Todd's office in Louisville City Hall on June 28, 1881.

Two organizational meetings, on July 9 and August 10, 1881, took place in the club's first home consisting of rented space over A. J. Ross's Grocery Store, located in a building at the southwest corner of 4th and Walnut Streets–which is the site of the present Seelbach Hotel (built 1905). The club's first president Maj. John Montgomery Wright (1841–1915) was elected at the latter meeting. He was a graduate of West Point, a Union veteran of the Civil War, and later served as Clerk of the United States Supreme Court.

Also at that meeting, the members adopted a proposal to name the club for the fictional Arthur Pendennis, who was seen as a paradigm club man, from William Makepeace Thackeray's History of Pendennis: His Fortunes and Misfortunes, His Friends and His Greatest Enemy (published 1850). Arthur Pendennis's crest, which was described but not depicted in this novel, and the motto nec tenui penna (meaning "with unfailing wings") were adopted for the club as well. By year's end, the crest had been rendered and was placed on bottles of Kentucky Bourbon sold to the club's members.

== Original clubhouse 1883–1928 ==
Levi Bloom stated that the club "grew like topsy," and many of Louisville's leading citizens joined from the start. In 1883, the club purchased its first permanent home–the residence of William Burke Belknap (1811–1889), founder of Belknap Hardware & Mfg. Co., located at 332 West Walnut Street.

The new clubhouse opened to members on August 1, 1883. On that same day, the Southern Exposition was also opened in Louisville by U.S. President Chester A. Arthur. That evening, President Arthur was a guest at the Pendennis Club where he and some of his cabinet members, including Robert Todd Lincoln, enjoyed a lavish dinner. Other U.S. Presidents who have visited the club include Theodore Roosevelt, William H. Taft, and Woodrow Wilson.

According to Levi Bloom, President Taft, who was a native of Cincinnati, "felt more at home and would rather come to the Pendennis Club than any other in the country." Perhaps one reason why he was so fond of the club is the following assessment of its members by later Pulitzer Prize winning journalist Arthur Krock:

If the term "gentleman" is held to its proper definition to mean a civilized, educated, well-mannered man, then no club in the United States numbered more such persons proportionate to its size than the Pendennis.

Another notable early visitor was famed landscape architect (and designer of New York City's Central Park) Frederick Law Olmsted. On May 20, 1891, he met for dinner at the club with leading Louisville citizens and Park Commissioners during his visit to the city in which he proposed his plan for the city's park system. Club member and Park Commissioner Andrew Cowan was instrumental in making this project a reality.

In 1895, Charles Spencer-Churchill, 9th Duke of Marlborough visited the club. That same year, Alexander Lewis composed the Pendennis 2-Step.

=== Henry Bain ===
In 1884, there came to the club the first of several staff members who would become true legends–Henry T. Bain (1863–1928). Starting as the "elevator boy," it was not long before he became, perhaps, the first Maitre d' in the club's history, and his outstanding character made him a true legend. As Club member and Louisville Courier-Journal publisher Barry Bingham, Sr. later explained,

it could not have been long before the members noticed his dignity, his perfect manners, and his remarkable memory for names. It was a later tradition that Henry knew every man and woman in "Louisville society," and that he was familiar with their pedigrees as well. ...

He retired in 1924 and died just months before the opening of the new clubhouse in 1928, in which he was to have played a major part.

His legacy, though, lives on in the superlative sauce for meat that he created at the club–known as Henry Bain sauce. He sold the recipe to the club, and the club holds the trademark to it. His sauce is not only still enjoyed by the club's members, but it has also now been made available to the public in various local retail stores.

A reputed nephew of Henry Bain, Roland Hayes (1887–1977), made his 1910 debut at the club as a classical lyric tenor.

== Cocktails ==
The Pendennis Club has a strong tradition of cocktails, most notably claiming to have invented the old fashioned cocktail, and is also known for the eponymous cocktail, the Pendennis Club Cocktail. The claim to have invented the old fashioned cocktail is rejected as a "myth" (see below), and may be a confusion with its old fashioned toddy, but the club was well-reputed for its cocktails.

An authoritative overview of the cocktail menu at the club is given in. This book, published in Louisville in 1911, lists various bars and recipes of some drinks served at them. The entry for the Pendennis club, bearing the signature of the manager at the time, Louis Herring, presents six mixed drinks: Ananias Punch [a champagne punch], Lord Baltimore Cocktail, Pendennis Cocktail [Pendennis Club cocktail], Pendennis Mint Julep, Old Fashioned Toddy, and Pendennis Eggnog. The Pendennis's Old Fashioned Toddy is also listed in Straub's 1913 book by the former manager, as the Pendennis Toddy, and the Pendennis Champagne Punch has been enjoyed by generations of Club members.

Prohibition did not hinder the enjoyment by some of the club's members of their libations. On August 9, 1930, the club was raided, and six car-loads of the very best beverages were taken away. One agent commented: "I never saw so many kinds of drinks in my life."

=== The Old Fashioned Whisky Cocktail ===
It has long been claimed that the Old Fashioned Whisky Cocktail was invented at the Pendennis Club. This is flatly rejected as a "myth" by cocktail historians and writers Robert Simonson, David Wondrich, and Simon Difford on three grounds. Firstly, the first mention in print of "old fashioned cocktails" was in the Chicago Daily Tribune in February 1880, before the Pendennis Club was opened, and most commonly referred to old fashioned whiskey cocktails; recipes for a whiskey "Old Fashioned Cocktail" date to 1888. The term came into use for those who wanted the simple original cocktail–liquor with bitters, sugar and water–rather than more elaborate versions that had come into being by the mid-19th century. Secondly, the recipe itself had existed for decades – it was the traditional way of making cocktails – and the name "old fashioned" was simply a re-packaging of a drink that had long existed. Wondrich writes:

Since the Chicago Daily Tribune was already discussing ‘old fashioned cocktails’ in February of 1880 and the Pendennis Club wasn’t founded until 1881, I think it’s safe to pronounce this myth busted.

— David Wondrich, Imbibe! pp. 196–199

Thirdly, the 1913 cocktail book by the long-time manager of the club does not list an old fashioned whiskey cocktail, nor credit it to the club he had long managed.

An old fashioned toddy (without bitters) is listed as one of the club's six mixed drinks in the 1911 list, with recipe:

OLD FASHIONED TODDY
Dissolve one-half lump of sugar thoroughly.
One cube of ice.
One jigger of whiskey.
Stir well and serve in toddy glass.

The same drink appears in Straub's 1913 book, by the former manager of the club, as the Pendennis Toddy, with recipe:

PENDENNIS TODDY
Crush ½ Lump of Sugar with a little Water in an Old Fashion Glass.
1 Jigger Bourbon.
1 Lump of Ice.

The same book also lists an Old Fashion Cocktail [sic], specifying Angostura and orange bitters, a piece of cut loaf sugar, and liqueur of choice. It does not specify whiskey, nor mention the Pendennis Club. Recipes for an old fashioned whiskey toddy also date to 1888.

Nevertheless, there is a long-standing story attributing the cocktail to this club. The first known version of this story in print is due to Albert Stevens Crockett of the Waldorf-Astoria, writing in 1931:

Cocktails
Old-Fashioned Whiskey
This was brought to the old Waldorf in the days of its “sit-down” Bar, and introduced by, or in honor of, Col. James E. Pepper, of Kentucky, proprietor of a celebrated whiskey of the period. The Old-fashioned Whiskey cocktail was said to have been the invention of a bartender at the famous Pendennis Club in Louisville, of which Col. Pepper was a member.

Given that this is over 50 years after the term "old-fashioned cocktails" appeared in print, and over 30 years after recipes for an "old-fashioned whiskey cocktail" appeared in recipe books from Chicago, Cincinnati, and New York City, this is not a credible claim.

The persons involved do exist, however. The Waldorf bartender Crockett was a native of Maryland, while club records confirm that James E. Pepper (1850–1906), a Lexington, Kentucky resident, became a member of the club in 1893. Club oral tradition among bartenders back to Craig Talley, who started at the club in 1911, credits Pepper with introducing the Old Fashioned to New York City.

Two bartenders who worked at the club are credited with the drink, in both cases having published a recipe for the old fashioned when later working at a different bar, decades after other recipes had already been published.

The first is Jacques Straub (1865–1920), a native of Switzerland, who came to the club by 1889 as kitchen help and later became the club's manager. After moving to Chicago in 1909 to become the wine steward of the Blackstone Hotel, he published Straub's Manuel of Mixed Drinks in 1913, as discussed above.

The other known candidate, Tom Bullock (1872–1964), was a Louisville native who went to work at the club as a bartender in about 1892 and, by 1917, had become the head bartender at the St. Louis Country Club. While there, he published The Ideal Bartender in 1917 with an Old Fashion Cocktail [sic] recipe, though with no mention of the Pendennis Club.

A third possible candidate is identified in the 1969 edition of George Leonard Harter's Bull Cook and Authentic Historical Recipes and Practices as Thomas Louis Whitcomb, who it says invented the cocktail at the club in 1889. No records have been found documenting this individual's existence, much less association with the club at the time.

The recipe for the Old Fashioned in use at the Pendennis Club includes the basic cocktail components including sugar and water (simple syrup) and bitters – but with the Angostura brand required. In addition, fine Bourbon whisky is required and, also are one or more fruits: the recipe used at the club since at least the 1930s calls for the use of an orange slice, cherry, and a lemon twist with the former two muddled in the simple syrup.

== New clubhouse ==
- Pendennis Club
- U.S. National Register of Historic Places
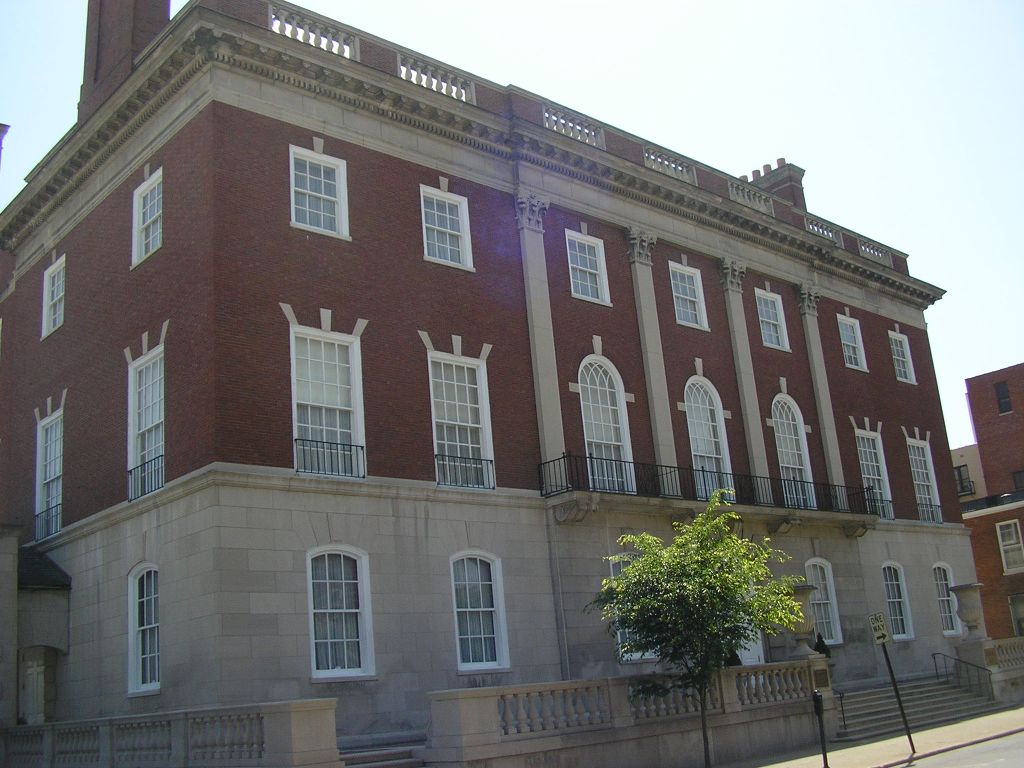
- Modern clubhouse in Downtown Louisville
- Location: Louisville, Kentucky
- Coordinates: 38°15′3.22″N 85°45′17.14″W
- Built: 1928
- Built by: Wortham Construction Company
- Architect: Nevin, Wischmeyer and Morgan
- Architectural style: Colonial Revival
- NRHP reference No.: 03001225
- Added to NRHP: December 4, 2003

The Pendennis Club constructed its current clubhouse, about a block east from the location of the original, in 1927–1928. This notable Georgian Revival building with nearly 80,000 square feet under roof was designed by the Louisville firm of Nevin, Wischmeyer & Morgan. Architect Frederic L. Morgan contributed all the designs for the exterior and interior additions and renovations. Local contractor Wortham Construction oversaw construction.

Mr. Nevin commented at the time that the new $1 million structure was designed to be "one of the finest club buildings in the country," and he emphasized to a newspaper reporter "that the very best material and equipment will go into the structure." The building remains one of the finest clubhouses in the United States and not only includes a large variety of Georgian architectural details but also includes two rooms with the famed French woodblock printed wallpaper by Zuber & Cie. It opened to the members on December 11, 1928.

A photograph of the club's walnut-paneled library was featured in the March 27, 1948, edition of New Yorker Magazine showing the room with its spacious library tables, red leather chairs, sofas, and shelves of books rising up to the plaster-work ceiling: the room looks very much the same today and has changed little in the more than seven decades since this publication.

The facade of the clubhouse was placed on the National Register of Historic Places in 2003. Today, the club's walnut-paneled billiard room with teak wood floor is one of the few surviving grand billiard rooms in the United States still in use for its original purpose. The racquet sport of Squash was first introduced in Louisville at the Pendennis Club in 1930, when the first of two handball courts was converted to Squash.

It is about 100 by 160 feet (30 m × 49 m) in plan, not including its porte-cochere.

== Discrimination ==
Although one of the founding members of the Pendennis Club, Levi Bloom, was Jewish, the club did not admit another Jewish member until 1974, more than 90 years after its founding. Several prominent club members had resigned their membership in the years leading up to this date because Jewish men who they nominated were not accepted.

By 1991, the club had still not admitted any African-American members. Louis Coleman Jr., a local civil rights activist and Pastor at Shelbyville Congregational Methodist Church protested the lack of minority membership by sitting at a table in front of the club and eating lunch.

That same year, Coleman filed complaints with the Kentucky Commission on Human Rights (KCHR) against the Pendennis Club and two other Clubs (the Louisville Country Club, and the Idle Hour Country Club) claiming discrimination in their membership processes.

The KCHR initially dismissed Coleman's charges because Kentucky law exempted private clubs from at least some of the anti-discrimination law. Subsequent legal developments led to a case in which the Supreme Court of Kentucky ruled that while the Pendennis club is free from the anti-discrimination law in regards to who they have to admit as members, it was not exempt from provisions of the law that denied the right of members of discriminating clubs the right to deduct their membership fees from their taxes. Therefore, the KCHR could investigate the club to determine if this provision should be applied. That decision was released in 2004.

== Notable events ==
The Pendennis Club has been the venue for numerous debutante presentations and parties along with other major social events of the year.

Periodically since at least 1941, the Pendennis Club has hosted a stag boxing night–with a boxing ring set up in the club's grand Georgian ballroom. On February 19, 1960, then Cassius Clay (Muhammad Ali) participated in this event, in which he scored a third-round technical knockout over Ronnie Craddock, whom he had also just beaten in the recent Golden Gloves heavyweight final. Later that year, he participated in the Olympics and turned professional. His participation in the club's event is not surprising since at least five of the eleven Louisville men who sponsored him in his early years were Club members.

That was not the only notable event in the club's ballroom as it was the setting for the "Belmont Ball" scene in the 2010 Disney movie Secretariat on October 9, 2009.

Numerous Club events have long accompanied the annual running of the Kentucky Derby. Various celebrities and royalty have been guests at the club for these events, including at its very popular Post Derby Party on the night of the race.

== See also ==
- List of American gentlemen's clubs
