= Old fashioned (cocktail) =

Cocktail made with whiskey, bitters and sugar

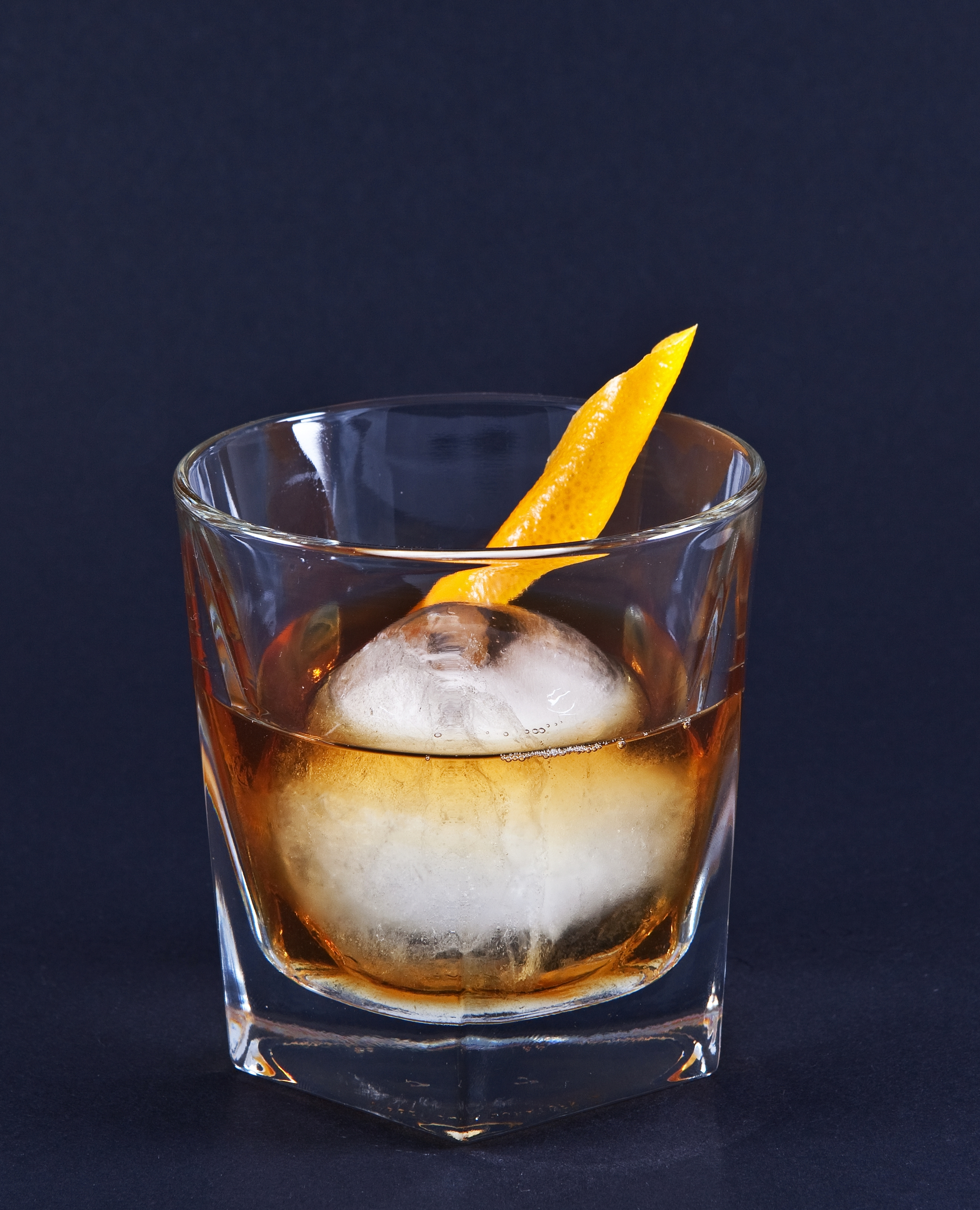
- Type: Cocktail
- Ingredients: 45 ml bourbon or rye whiskey; 1 sugar cube; Few dashes Angostura bitters; Few dashes plain water
- Base spirit: Whiskey (rye or bourbon)
- Standard drinkware: Old fashioned glass
- Standard garnish: Orange slice or zest, and cocktail cherry
- Served: On the rocks: poured over ice

The old fashioned is a cocktail made by muddling sugar with bitters and water, adding whiskey (typically rye or bourbon) or sometimes brandy, and garnishing with an orange slice or zest and a cocktail cherry. It is traditionally served with ice in an old fashioned glass (also known as a rocks glass).

Developed during the 19th century and given its name in the 1880s, it is an IBA official cocktail. It is also one of six basic drinks listed in David A. Embury's The Fine Art of Mixing Drinks.

== History ==
The recipe for the old fashioned dates to the early 1800s, though not by that name. The term "old-fashioned cocktails" dates to 1880, and recipes by that name appear in cocktail books of the late 1880s and 1890s, with Proulx (1888) of Chicago the earliest known.

An old fashioned was one of the simpler and earlier versions of cocktails, before the development of advanced bartending techniques and recipes in the later part of the 19th century. The first documented definition of the word "cocktail" was in response to a reader's letter asking to define the word in the 6 May 1806, issue of The Balance and Columbian Repository in Hudson, New York. In the 13 May 1806, issue, the paper's editor wrote that it was a potent concoction of spirits, bitters, water, and sugar; it was also referred to at the time as a bittered sling. J.E. Alexander describes the cocktail similarly in 1833, as he encountered it in New York City, as being rum, gin, or brandy, significant water, bitters, and sugar, though he includes a nutmeg garnish as well.

By the 1860s, it was common for orange curaçao, absinthe, and other liqueurs to be added to the cocktail. As cocktails became more complex, drinkers accustomed to simpler cocktails began to ask bartenders for something akin to the pre-1850s drinks. The original concoction, albeit in different proportions, came back into vogue, and was referred to as "old-fashioned". The most popular of the in-vogue "old-fashioned" cocktails were made with whiskey, according to a Chicago barman, quoted in the Chicago Daily Tribune in 1882, with rye being more popular than Bourbon. The recipe he describes is a similar combination of spirits, bitters, water, and sugar of seventy-six years earlier.

=== Myths ===
The invention of the old fashioned is sometimes credited to the Pendennis Club, a gentlemen's club founded in 1881 in Louisville, Kentucky, and its introduction to New York to James E. Pepper, a prominent bourbon distiller and member of the club. This attribution is due to Albert Stevens Crockett of the Waldorf-Astoria, writing in the 1930s:

Cocktails

Old-Fashioned Whiskey This was brought to the old Waldorf in the days of its “sit-down” Bar, and introduced by, or in honor of, Col. James E. Pepper, of Kentucky, proprietor of a celebrated whiskey of the period. The Old-fashioned Whiskey cocktail was said to have been the invention of a bartender at the famous Pendennis Club in Louisville, of which Col. Pepper was a member.

This is flatly contradicted by the historical record – multiple recipes by the name "Old-Fashioned Whiskey Cocktail" were published over 30 years before Crockett's claim, and the cocktail itself had existed for decades earlier. Cocktail historians also reject this claim – Robert Simonson rejects it, and David Wondrich rejects this origin story as a "myth", writing:

Since the Chicago Daily Tribune was already discussing ‘old fashioned cocktails’ in February of 1880 and the Pendennis Club wasn’t founded until 1881, I think it’s safe to pronounce this myth busted.

The popular story of how making an old-fashioned cocktail with brandy instead of whiskey began attributes it to the Chicago World's Fair in 1893, when the recently opened Korbel winery offered samples of their wine and brandy. Central European immigrants from Milwaukee took a liking to the Bohemian-born Korbel brothers' brandy, and brought it back to their home state and began using it in cocktails. This story is most likely false, however, and the practice more likely began after the Second World War due to supply shortages in spirits other than brandy.

=== Popularity ===
In January 2020, drinks journal Drinks International reported the old fashioned to be the top selling classic cocktail internationally, for the 6th straight year, based on its annual, global poll of 100 bars.

With its purported conception rooted in the city's history, in 2015 the city of Louisville named the old fashioned as its official cocktail. Each year, during the first two weeks of June, Louisville celebrates "Old Fashioned Fortnight", which encompasses bourbon events, cocktail specials, and National Bourbon Day which is always celebrated on 14 June.

Due to the popularity of the cocktail (when made with brandy) in the state of Wisconsin, the brandy old fashioned was named Wisconsin's state cocktail in 2023.

== Recipe ==
Early cocktails primarily used Holland gin or brandy, and did not use ice; they consisted of spirit, water, sugar, and bitters, often garnished with a grating of nutmeg. Sugar in turn was cut from a sugarloaf. By the 1860s, cocktails were generally iced, sugar syrup generally replaced solid sugar, whiskey had become a popular spirit, and a lemon twist replaced nutmeg as a garnish. Build was inconsistent: some were stirred, some shaken, some strained off the ice, some built in the glass. By the time "old-fashioned cocktails" started to be referred to in the 1880s, this still referred to various spirits – a whiskey version was called an "old fashioned whiskey cocktail" – but specified a lump of sugar, rather than syrup, building in the glass, and sometimes left a spoon in the glass, to stir or eat the partially undissolved sugar. This continued until Prohibition. Sugar cubes largely replaced sugar loaves around 1900, but some recipes continued to specify a sugar loaf. Orange slices began to be used as early as 1905.

After the repeal of Prohibition, recipes for an "old-fashioned" in the 1930s specified whiskey, and included other fruit (orange slice, cherry), which is reflected in the IBA recipe. These recipes existed prior to Prohibition, but were uncommon or considered different cocktails, not an old fashioned. With the cocktail renaissance in the 2000s, craft cocktail versions returned to the pre-Prohibition recipes, with only a lemon twist (or orange twist, or both, known as "rabbit ears"). By the 2020s, craft cocktail versions generally used sugar syrup, rather than solid sugar, due to better dissolving, consistency, and speed. Traditionally it is built in the glass, but others stir in a mixing glass and then strain over an ice cube.

=== Historical recipes ===
The earliest recipe for an old-fashioned cocktail is given by Theodore Proulx of Chapin & Gore of Chicago in 1888:

Old-fashioned Cocktail.

Take one-half lump of sugar, and dissolve it with water in a bar or whisky glass, which have the same meaning; then pour out the water; add a little bitters, syrup and absinthe as you would to any other cocktail; twist a piece of lemon-peel; drop in two or three pieces of ice, one jigger of whisky; stir with a spoon, and strain into another whisky glass.

No. 2. Prepared like the old-fashion No. 1, with the exception that you use one chunk of ice only and leave it in the glass instead of strain it.

Points to note include that this uses whiskey, without including it in the name; that it specifies either stirring and straining or building in the glass; it includes both half a lump of sugar and (sugar) syrup; and that it includes absinthe in addition to bitters. Proulx also gives a recipe for "Toddy–Old-fashioned", with only a lump of sugar, water, ice, and whiskey, with the spoon in the glass.

George Kappeler provides several of the earliest published recipes for old-fashioned cocktails in his 1895 book. Recipes are given for whiskey, brandy, Holland gin, and Old Tom gin. The whiskey old fashioned recipe specifies the following (with a jigger being 2 US fluid ounces or 59 millilitres):

Dissolve a small lump of sugar with a little water in a whiskey-glass; add two dashes Angostura bitters, a small piece ice, a piece lemon-peel, one jigger whiskey. Mix with small bar-spoon and serve, leaving spoon in the glass.

By the 1860s, as illustrated by Jerry Thomas's 1862 book, basic cocktail recipes included Curaçao or other liqueurs. These liqueurs were not mentioned in the early 19th century descriptions, nor the Chicago Daily Tribune descriptions of the "old-fashioned" cocktails of the early 1880s; they were absent from Kappeler's old-fashioned recipes as well. The differences of the old-fashioned cocktail recipes from the cocktail recipes of the late 19th Century are mainly preparation methods, the use of sugar and water in lieu of simple or gum syrup, and the absence of additional liqueurs. These old-fashioned cocktail recipes are literally for cocktails done the old-fashioned way.

Gin Cocktail
Use small bar glass
3 or 4 dashes of gum syrup
2 do [dashes] bitters Bogart's
1 wine glass of gin
1 or 2 dashes of Curaçao
1 small piece lemon peel
fill one-third full of fine ice shake well and strain in a glass

Old Fashioned Holland Gin Cocktail
Crush a small lump of sugar in a whiskey glass containing a little water,
add a lump of ice,
two dashes of Angostura bitters,
a small piece of lemon peel,
one jigger Holland gin.
Mix with a small bar spoon.
Serve.

Recipes varied in the fruit they used. In 1905, the Hoffman House Old Fashioned Whiskey Cocktail included an orange slice, though this was absent from other recipes. In 1934, an "Old Fashioned Cocktail (Whiskey)" featured a lemon peel, orange peel, and slice of pineapple.

A book by David Embury published in 1948 provides a slight variation, specifying 12 parts American whiskey, 1 part simple syrup, 1–3 dashes Angostura bitters, a twist of lemon peel over the top, and serve garnished with the lemon peel. Two additional recipes from the 1900s vary in the precise ingredients but omit the cherry which was introduced after 1930 as well as the soda water which the occasional recipe calls for. Orange bitters were a popular ingredient in the late 19th century.

== Modifications ==
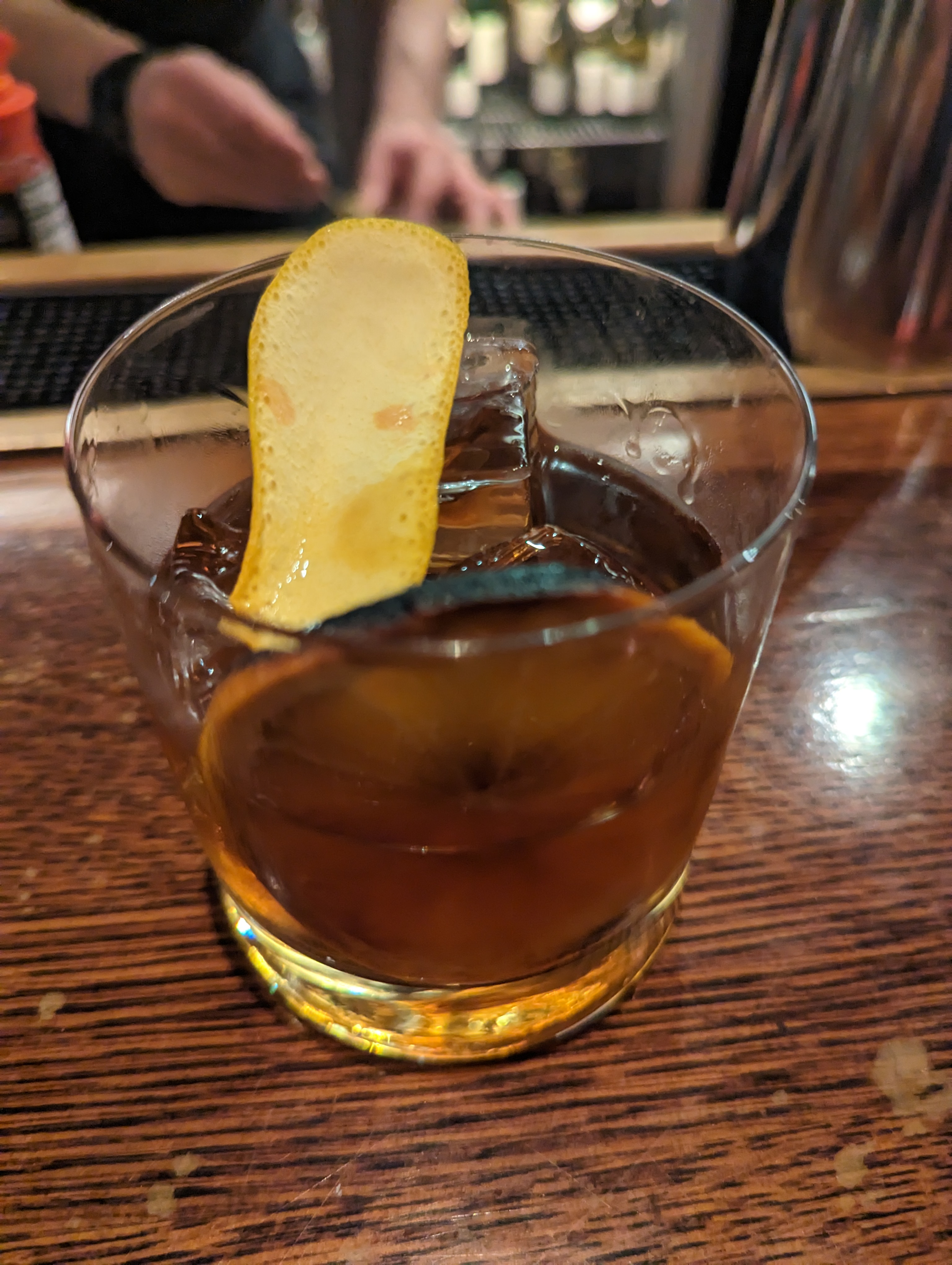
Smoked Old Fashioned, Restaurant R'Evolution, the French Quarter, New Orleans, Louisiana

The original old fashioned recipe would have showcased the whiskey available in America in the 19th century: Irish, Bourbon or rye whiskey. But in some regions, especially Wisconsin, brandy is substituted for whiskey (sometimes called a brandy old fashioned). Eventually the use of other spirits became common, such as a gin recipe becoming popularized in the late 1940s.

Common garnishes for an old fashioned include an orange slice or a maraschino cherry or both, although these modifications came around 1930, some time after the original recipe was invented. While some recipes began making sparse use of the orange zest for flavor, the practice of muddling orange and other fruit gained prevalence as late as the 1990s.

Some modern variants have greatly sweetened the old-fashioned, e.g. by adding blood orange soda or lemon-lime soda to make a fizzy old-fashioned, or muddled strawberries to make a strawberry old-fashioned. In Wisconsin, an "old fashioned, sweet" is made with lemon-lime soda, and "old fashioned, sour" is made with grapefruit soda.

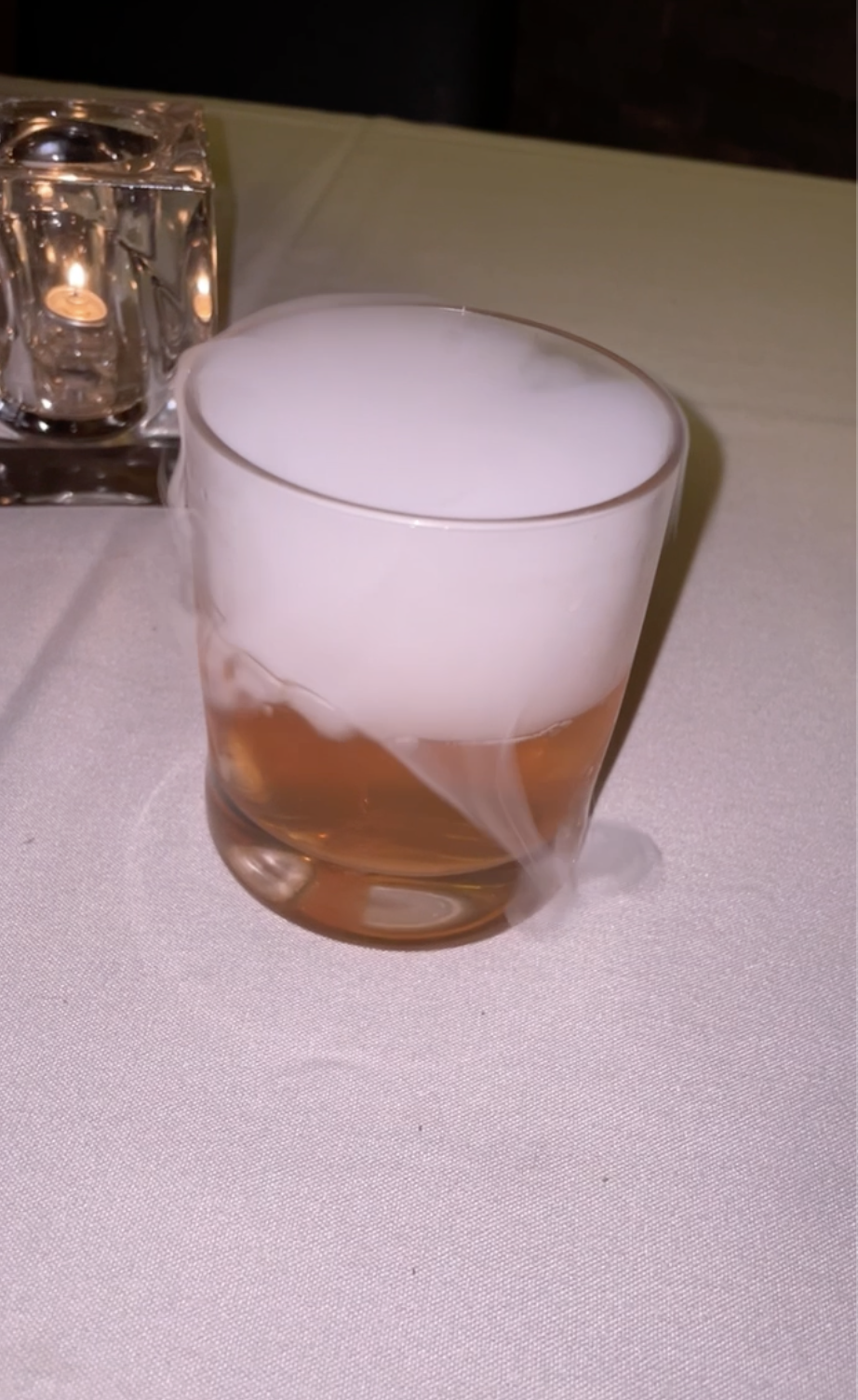
Smokin' Steve Old Fashioned

Modern versions may also include elaborately carved ice. Cocktail critic David Wondrich notes that this goes against the simple spirit of the old-fashioned.

Another more modern variation is the smoked old fashioned. The glass is smoked by a torch, smoking gun, or cocktail smoker. There is also an option through dry ice, the Smokin' Steve Old Fashioned, created by Steve Haddadin.

== Cultural impact ==
The old fashioned is the cocktail of choice of Don Draper, the lead character on the Mad Men television series, set in the 1960s. The use of the drink in the series coincided with a renewed interest in this and other classic cocktails in the 2000s.

It was also the basis of an oft-quoted line from the 1963 movie It's a Mad, Mad, Mad, Mad World, when boozy pilot Jim Backus decides to make the cocktail and leaves passenger Buddy Hackett to fly the plane. When Hackett asks, "What if something happens?" Backus replies, "What could happen to an old-fashioned?" This scene is satirized in Archer season 3 episode 1 ("Heart of Archness") when Sterling Archer attempts to make an old fashioned on Rip Riley's seaplane but lacks the basic ingredients.

The cocktail is the subject of the Cole Porter song "Make It Another Old-Fashioned, Please" from Panama Hattie, although the song asks to leave out the cherries, orange and bitters, and "Just make it a straight rye". It also features in the Panic! at the Disco song "Old Fashioned" from Pray for the Wicked (2018), being former frontman Brendon Urie's favourite drink. The drink is also the subject of Maisie Peters’ 2026 song “Old Fashioned”.

== See also ==
- List of cocktails
- Sazerac
