= Frederic L. Morgan =

American architect (1889–1970)

- Born: January 6, 1889; Loda, Illinois
- Died: May 29, 1970 (aged 81); Louisville, Kentucky
- Occupation: Architect
- Awards: Fellow, American Institute of Architects (1949)
- Practice: Nevin, Wischmeyer & Morgan; Nevin & Morgan

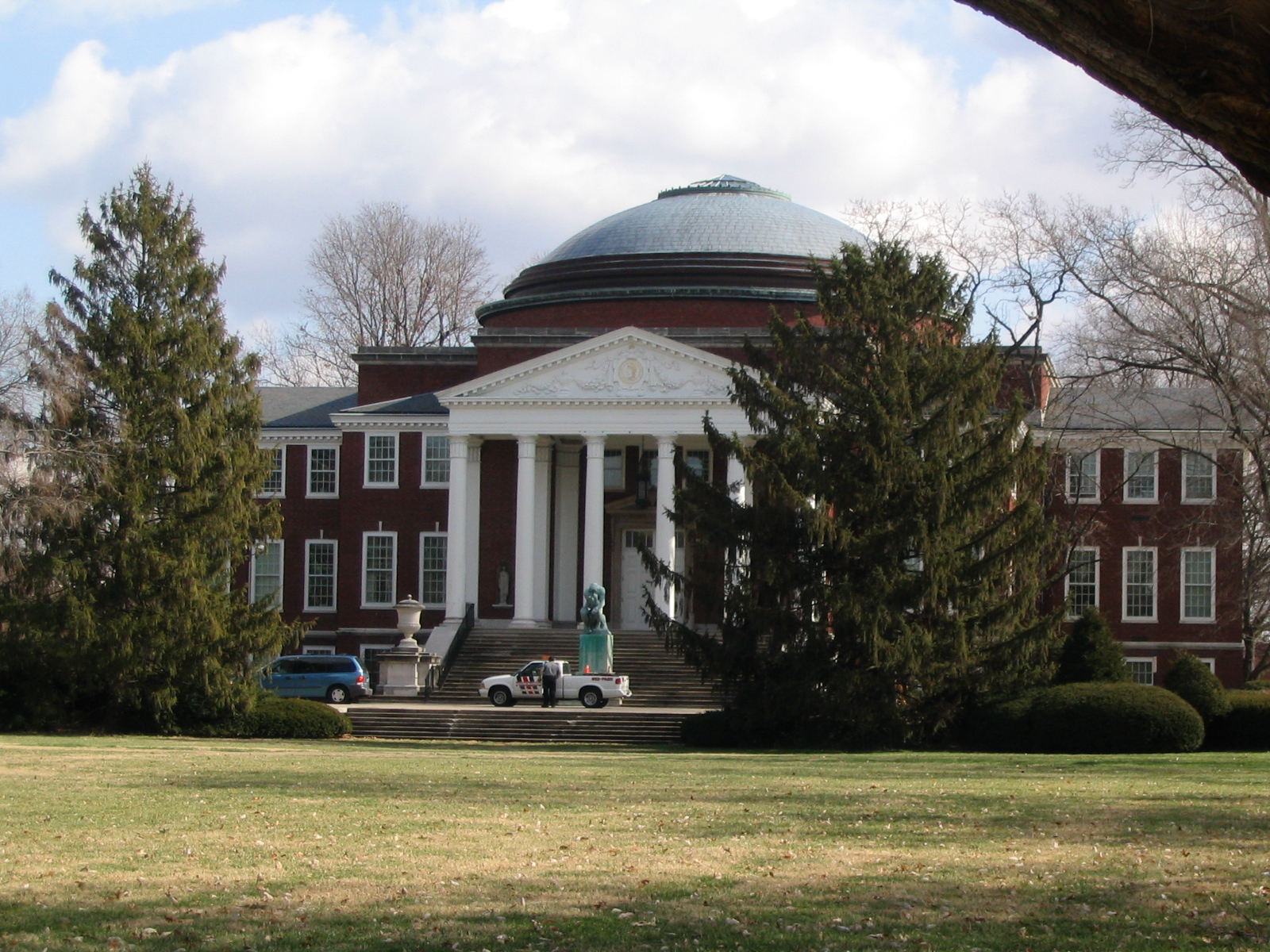
Grawemeyer Hall of the University of Louisville, designed by Morgan and Arthur G. Tafel Jr. and completed in 1927.

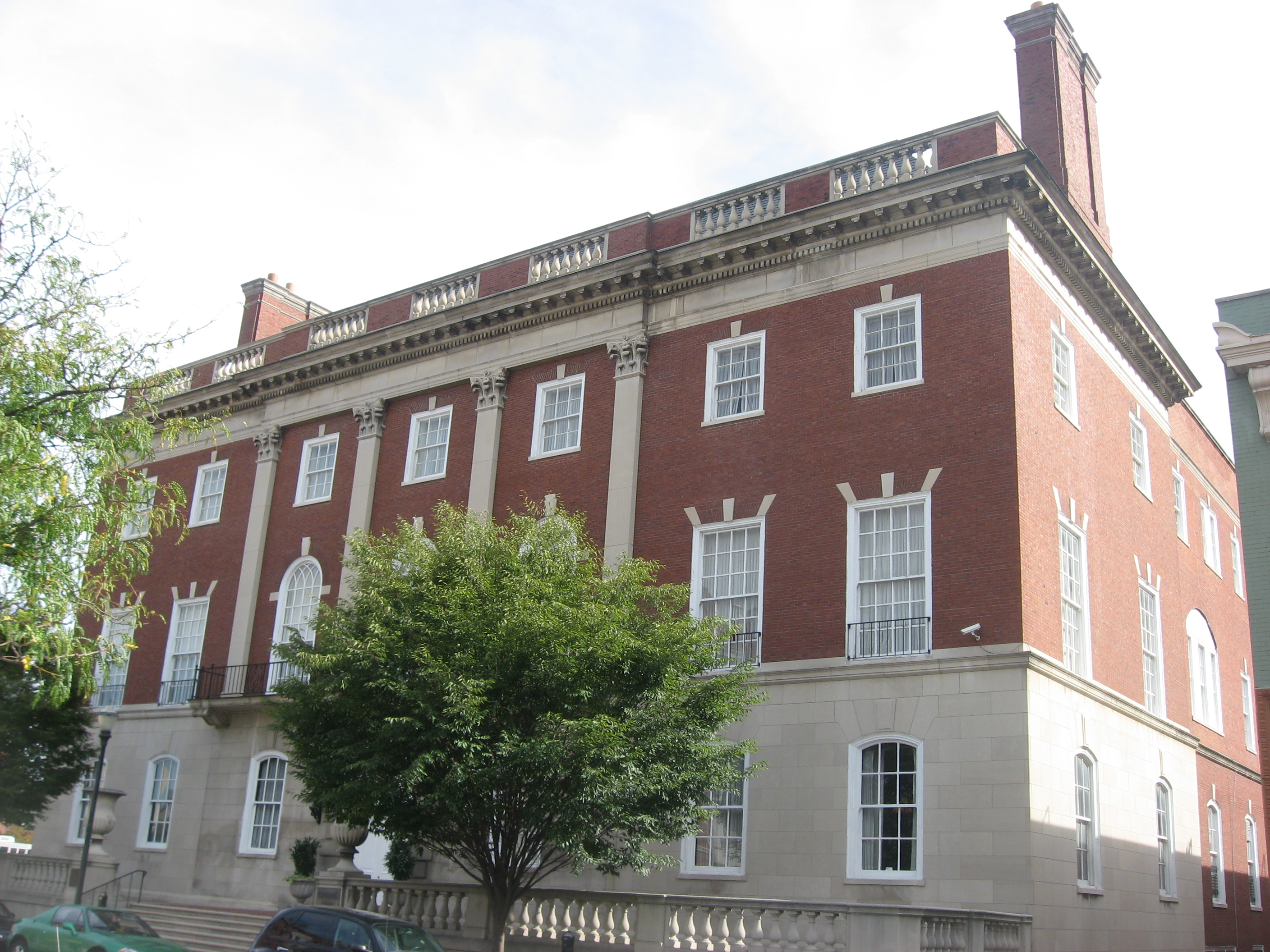
The Pendennis Club in Louisville, designed by Nevin, Wischmeyer & Morgan and completed in 1928.

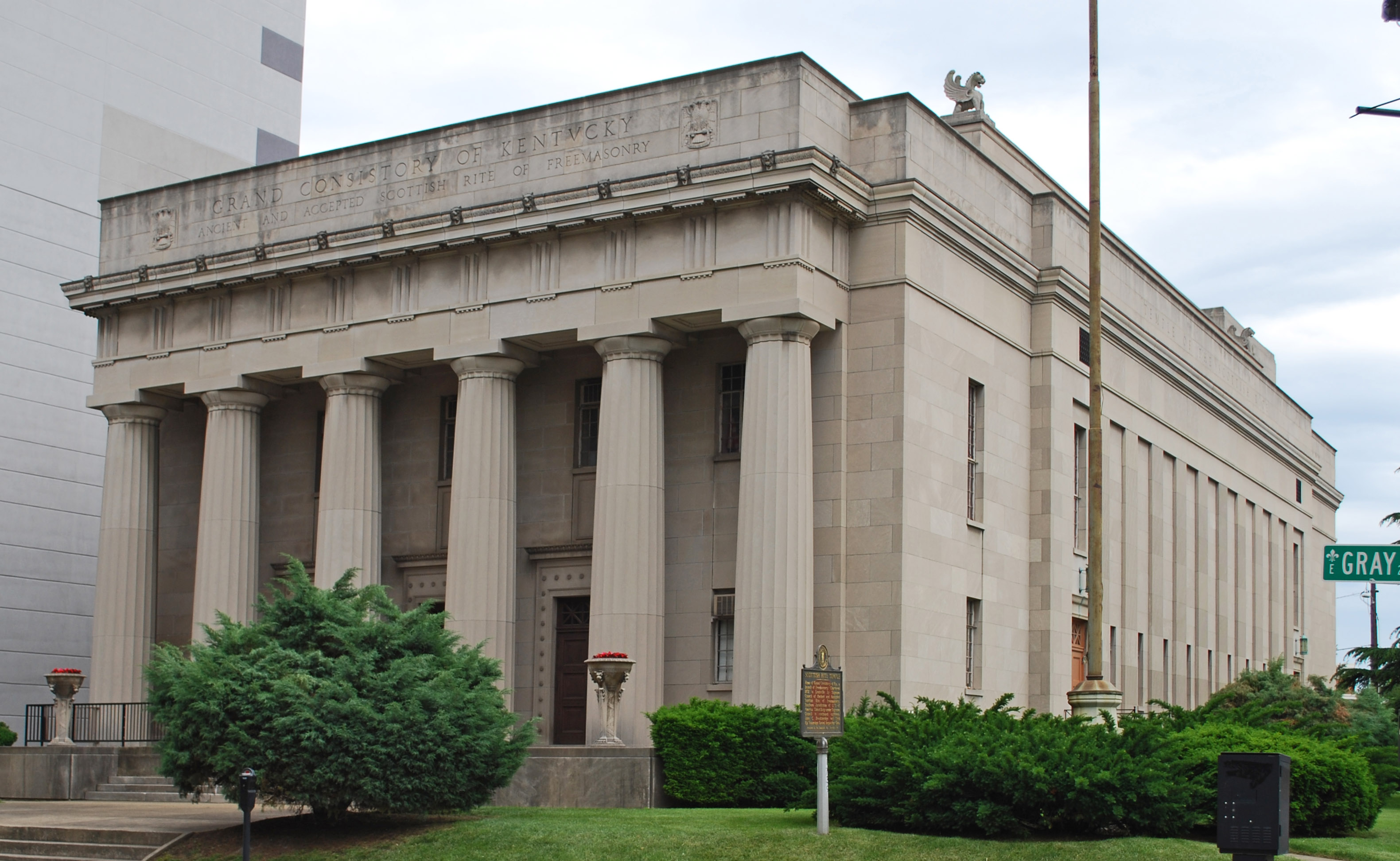
The Ancient and Accepted Scottish Rite Temple in Louisville, designed by Nevin, Wischmeyer & Morgan and completed in 1931.

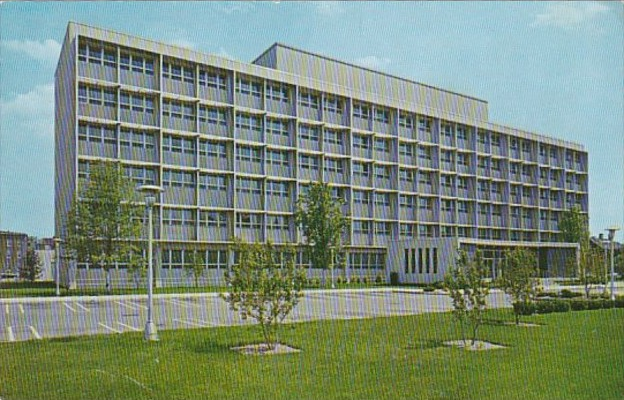
The former Methodist Evangelical Hospital in Louisville, designed by Nevin & Morgan and completed in 1960.

Frederic L. Morgan FAIA (January 6, 1889 – May 29, 1970) was an American architect in practice in Louisville, Kentucky from 1921 until his death in 1970. Morgan spent nearly all of his career as partner responsible for design for Nevin & Morgan, the most successful architectural firm in Louisville during its existence.

== Life and career ==
Frederic Lindley Morgan was born January 6, 1889, in Loda, Illinois to Joseph Sidney Morgan and Maud Morgan, née Lindley. He was educated at the University of Illinois, graduating in 1912 with a BSArch. This was followed by travel in Europe.

In 1913 he joined the office of J. Earl Henry, architect to Louisville Public School District. In 1915 he moved to Detroit, where he worked for architects Malcomson & Higginbotham and Smith, Hinchman & Grylls.

In 1919 he returned to Louisville, where he joined Henry's new private sector firm, Nevin & Henry, as chief designer. Senior partner Hugh L. Nevin had been in practice in Louisville for about a decade. Henry died in 1920, and in 1921 Nevin formed a new partnership, Nevin, Wischmeyer & Morgan, with Morgan and Herman Wischmeyer. In 1929 the partnership was reorganized as Nevin, Morgan & Kolbrook with the withdrawal of Wischmeyer and the admission of Joseph H. Kolbrook. In 1942 Kolbrook also withdrew and the firm became Nevin & Morgan. The partnership was changed for the last time in 1967 to Nevin, Morgan & Weber, reflecting the addition of Herbert A. Weber. The firm was dissolved after the deaths of Nevin in 1969 and Morgan in 1970.

Nearly all of Morgan's career was spent as partner responsible for design for Nevin & Morgan and its associated firms. He was best known for the design of buildings in traditional revival styles, especially residences in the Georgian Revival style. Morgan was a member of the American Institute of Architects and was elected a Fellow in 1949 for his design work. At the time of his nonimation to Fellowship, AIA Kentucky president Frederick R. Louis wrote that Morgan was "the finest Architectural designer in the Commonwealth of Kentucky."

== Personal life ==
Morgan never married. He was a member of the Filson Club and the Arts Club of Louisville. He died May 29, 1970, in Louisville. Morgan donated his estate to the University of Louisville, which was used to endow the Frederic Lindley Morgan Chair of Architectural Design.

== Architectural works ==
=== Nevin & Henry, 1919–1921 ===
- 1921 – Lincoln School, (Note: NRHP-listed.) (Note: Demolished.) S 8th St, Paducah, Kentucky
- 1921 – Augusta Tilghman High School, 2400 Washington St, Paducah, Kentucky

=== Nevin, Wischmeyer & Morgan, 1921–1929 ===
- 1923 – Tway House, 10235 Timberwood Cir, Jeffersontown, Kentucky
- 1924 – First Presbyterian Church, 185 N Maple Ave, Covington, Virginia
- 1924 – Harrodsburg High School (former), 441 E Lexington St, Harrodsburg, Kentucky
- 1926 – Shady Brook Farm, (Note: A contributing resource to the Harrods Creek Historic District, NRHP-listed in 1991.) the Theodore Mueller estate, 5802 River Rd, Louisville, Kentucky
- 1927 – Bingham-Hilliard Doll House, 5001 Avish Ln, Louisville, Kentucky
- 1927 – Grawemeyer Hall, (Note: Designed by the Allied Architects of Kentucky, a venture led by Morgan, who along with Arthur G. Tafel Jr. was responsible for the design. A contributing resource to the University of Louisville Belknap Campus historic district, NRHP-listed in 1976.) University of Louisville, Louisville, Kentucky
- 1927 – Highland United Methodist Church, 1140 Cherokee Rd, Louisville, Kentucky
- 1927 – Louisville Collegiate School, 2427 Glenmary Ave, Louisville, Kentucky
- 1927 – Schuster Building, 1500 Bardstown Rd, Louisville, Kentucky
- 1928 – Haldeman House, 3609 Glenview Ave, Louisville, Kentucky
- 1928 – Pendennis Club, 218 W Muhammad Ali Blvd, Louisville, Kentucky
- 1929 – Bayless House, 1116 Bellewood Rd, Anchorage, Kentucky
- 1929 – Drumanard, 6401 Wolf Pen Branch Rd, Louisville, Kentucky
- 1931 – Ancient and Accepted Scottish Rite Temple, 200 E Gray St, Louisville, Kentucky

=== Nevin, Morgan & Kolbrook, 1929–1942 ===
- 1931 – Lincoln Marriage Temple, Old Fort Harrod State Park, Harrodsburg, Kentucky
- 1935 – Jones-Dabney Company laboratory, 1495 S 11th St, Louisville, Kentucky
- 1936 – John V. Collis residence, 3750 Upper River Rd, Louisville, Kentucky
- 1937 – William C. Dabney residence, 3760 Upper River Rd, Louisville, Kentucky
- 1941 – Carver Hall, Southern Baptist Theological Seminary, Louisville, Kentucky

=== Nevin & Morgan, 1942–1967 ===
- 1948 – St. Francis in the Fields Episcopal Church, 6710 Wolf Pen Branch Rd, Harrods Creek, Kentucky
- 1950 – Alumni Chapel, (Note: Designed by Nevin & Morgan and Joseph H. Kolbrook, associated architects.) Southern Baptist Theological Seminary, Louisville, Kentucky
- 1950 – Lee Terminal, Louisville International Airport, Louisville, Kentucky
- 1954 – Speed Art Museum Preston Pope Satterwhite addition, 2035 S 3rd St, Louisville, Kentucky
- 1957 – Schneider Hall, (Note: Designed by O'Connor & Kilham, architects, with Nevin & Morgan, associate architects.) University of Louisville, Louisville, Kentucky
- 1957 – Second Presbyterian Church, 3701 Old Brownsboro Rd, Louisville, Kentucky
- 1960 – Broadway Baptist Church, 4000 Brownsboro Rd, Louisville, Kentucky
- 1960 – Methodist Evangelical Hospital (former), 315 E Broadway, Louisville, Kentucky
- 1961 – Garden Pavilion, Bernheim Arboretum and Research Forest, Louisville, Kentucky
- 1962 – Independence Life and Accident Insurance Company home office, 137 W Muhammad Ali Blvd Ste. 200, Louisville, Kentucky
- 1962 – Kentucky State Medical Association offices, 3532 Janet Ave, Louisville, Kentucky
