= Cuisine of Kentucky =

Food and drinks from Kentucky

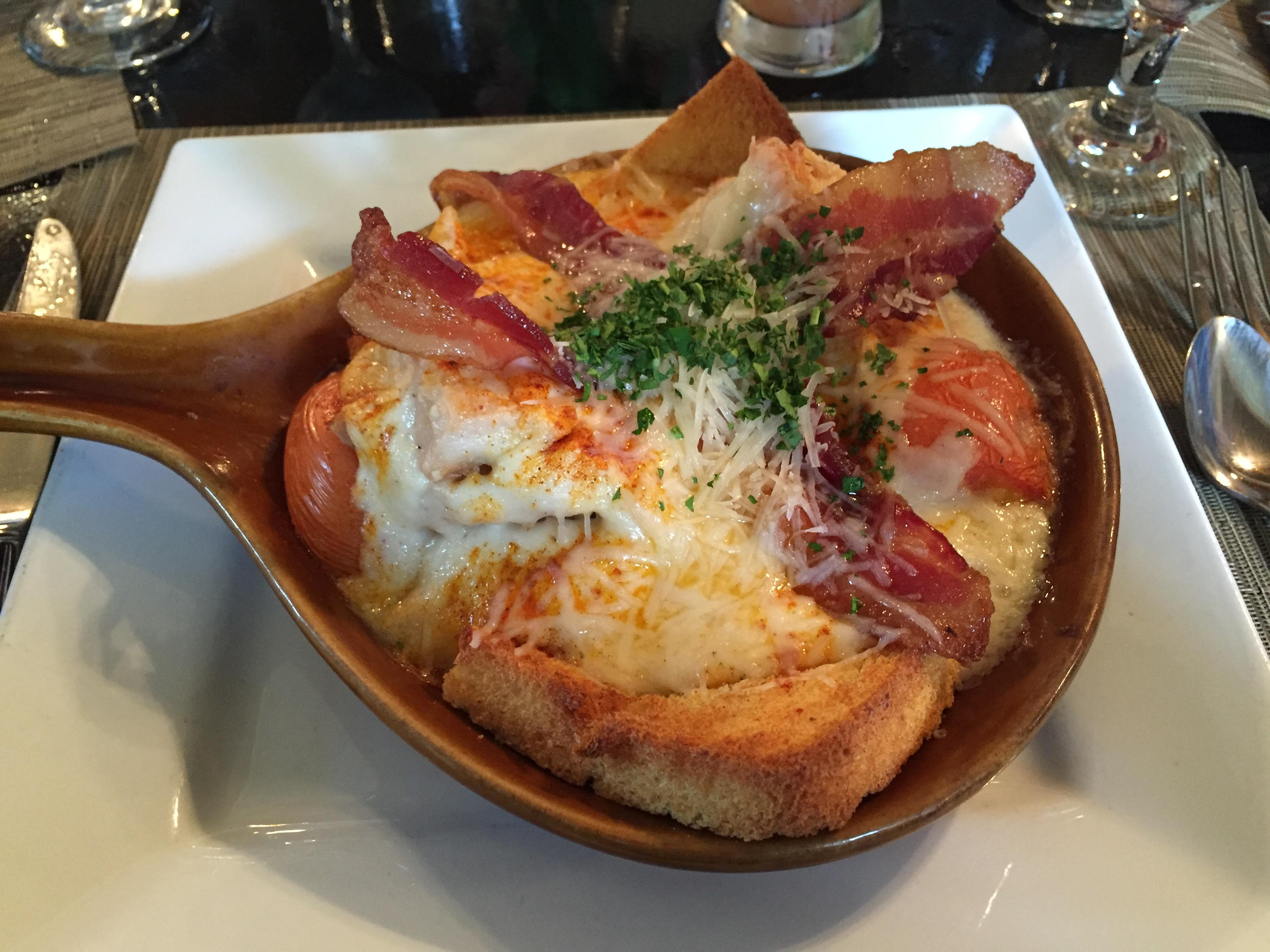
The Hot Brown was first served in Louisville's Brown Hotel

The cuisine of Kentucky mostly resembles and is a part of traditional Southern cuisine. Some common dinner dishes are fried catfish and hushpuppies, fried chicken and country fried steak. These are usually served with vegetables such as green beans, greens, pinto beans (or "soup beans") slow-cooked with pork as seasoning and served with cornbread. Other popular items include fried green tomatoes, cheese grits, corn pudding, fried okra, and chicken and dumplings, which can be found across the commonwealth.

In addition to this, Kentucky is known for its own regional style of barbecue. This style of barbecue is unique in itself given that it uses mutton, and is a style of Southern barbecue unique to Kentucky.

Although Kentucky's cuisine is generally very similar to that of traditional Southern cuisine, it does differ with some unique dishes, especially in Louisville where the Hot Brown and Derby pie (a variation of pecan pie, common throughout the American South), originated.

In northwestern parts of Kentucky, burgoo is a favorite, while in southwestern parts of the state, regular chili con carne is a typical staple. In northern Kentucky plus Louisville and Lexington, Cincinnati chili is a popular fast food. Northern Kentucky and the Louisville area are also home to a pronounced German-American population, translating into northern-like preferences for beer and European sausages. However, the remainder of the state's cuisine tends to be thoroughly Southern, preferring breakfast meats like country ham, ground pork sausage and as their beverage of choice, the state's renowned bourbon whiskey. Some common desserts are chess pie, pecan pie, blackberry cobbler and bread pudding.

== History ==
Pioneer and missionary author Timothy Flint wrote that the Kentuckians ate persimmon, venison, wild turkey, sweet potato and "pies smoked on the table" washed down with maple beer and Madeira wine when the game was plentiful, and "hog and homily" in lean times.

Food prices were low and money hard to come by in the intervening years between settlement and admission to the Union. Salt was quite costly, but sweeteners like honey and maple were more commonly available. Prices for staple foodstuffs such as beef, mutton, pork, geese, chicken, turkey, butter and flour are known from Gilbert Imlay's account.

Homes in the frontier lands of Kentucky were often unfloored, the shelters ranged between humble lean-tos and more sturdy cabins. Only in the better cabins were hearths made with stone. Daniel Drake, a Cincinnati born physician, described his 18th-century Kentucky home:

"I know of no scene in civilized life more primitive than such a cabin hearth as that of my mother. In the morning, a buckeye backlog & hickory forestick resting on stone andirons, with a Jonny cake on a clean ash board, set before it to bake, a frying pan with its long handle resting on a split bottomed turner's chair, sending out its peculiar music, and the tea kettle swng from a wooden 'lug pole' with myself setting the table, or turning the meat, or watching the Jonny cake..."

Thomas Ashe mentions salt bacon, squirrel broth and hominy in his report of a Kentucky dinner. According to Ashe the Kentucky pioneers rarely ate vegetables or fresh meat: "The Kentuckyan [sic] ate nothing but bacon, which indeed is the favourite diet of all the inhabitants of the State, and drank nothing but whiskey, which soon made him more than two thirds drunk."

== Notable dishes and recipes ==
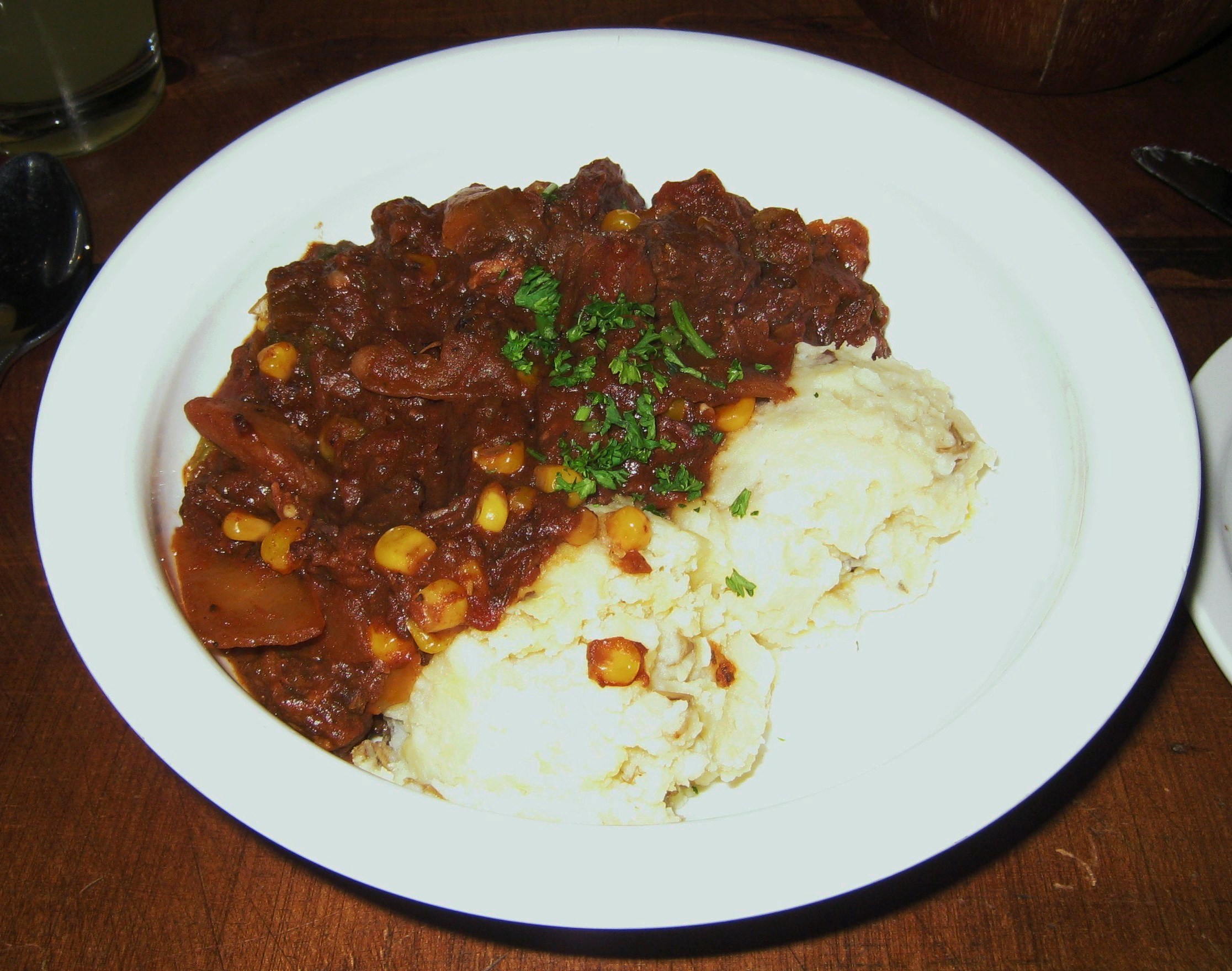
Kentucky burgoo served with mashed potatoes

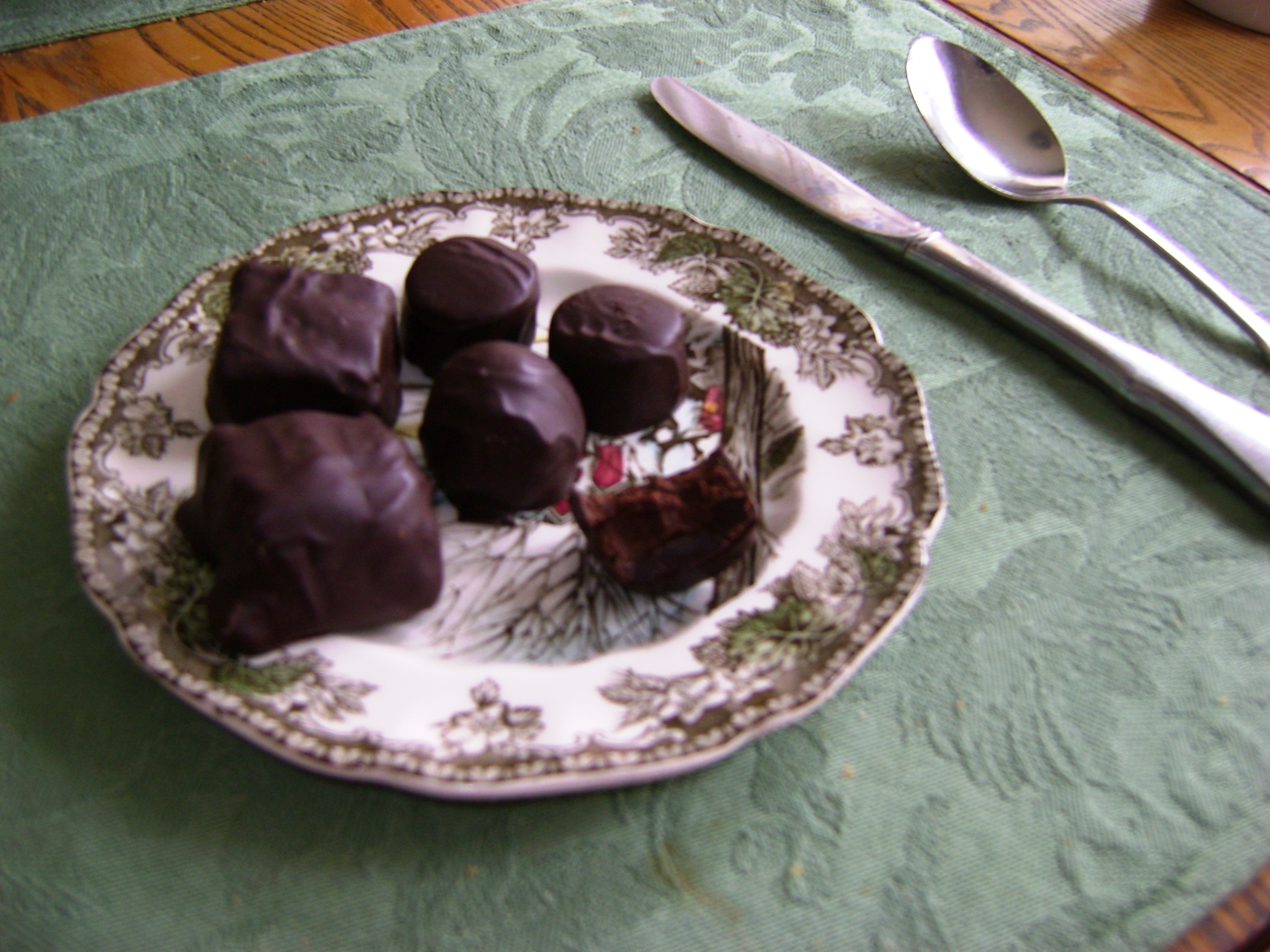
Bourbon balls

- Ale-8-One—a ginger-flavored soft drink bottled in Winchester
- Beer cheese—a cheese spread made with beer, Cheddar cheese, and spices
- Benedictine—a cucumber and cream cheese spread with green food coloring made popular by Louisville caterer and cookbook author Jennie C. Benedict
- Biscuits and gravy—a flour biscuit covered in white gravy (sometimes the gravy has ground black pepper)
- Bourbon balls—crushed cookies mixed with chocolate and bourbon, then coated in powdered sugar, first produced in Frankfort during Prohibition
- Brains and eggs- though more commonly associated with Indiana, this was served in Frankfort restaurants until BSE scares.
- Burgoo—a thick stew made from vegetables and mutton (lamb) or game meats
- Chow-Chow—a regionally diverse dish of chilled pickled vegetables found throughout Appalachia
- Derby pie—a chocolate and walnut pie named for the Kentucky Derby
- Fried catfish—catfish native to Kentucky lakes and rivers are tossed in batter and then fried a crispy golden-brown
- Frog legs—breaded and deep-fried
- Goetta—a northern Kentucky delicacy composed primarily of ground meat, steel-cut oats and seasoned with bay leaves, rosemary, salt, pepper and thyme
- Henry Bain sauce—a potent sauce for serving with game
- Hot Brown—a layered dish of bread, bacon, and turkey, topped with a Mornay sauce
- Johnny cake—also known in some regions of the state as spider cornbread, is a flat cornbread cooked by direct heat
- Kentucky Common—a regional beer style historically served around the Louisville area
- Lamb fries—lamb testicles served breaded and fried, often with cream gravy, a traditional dish served in the Bluegrass region of Kentucky Some experts have stated that the dish is more specific to the Lexington region, rather than applying to the region at large.
- Mingua beef jerky—made and packaged in Bourbon County
- Mint julep—a drink that is made with bourbon and crushed mint and is the "official" drink of the Kentucky Derby
- Mock turtle soup—Welsh and English settlers brought this recipe with them when they settled in Clay County
- Modjeska—a gooey caramel candy with a marshmallow center named for a 19th-century Polish actress who once visited Louisville
- Rolled oyster—a seafood dish served in and around Louisville
- Ski—a citrus soda made from orange and lemon juices manufactured by the Double Cola Company prevalent in the Southern part of the state
- Spoonbread—is a sweet, moist cornmeal-based dish
- Stack cake—an Appalachian layered cake with apple preserves spread between each layer

== Ingredients ==
=== Vegetables ===
Potatoes, corn, carrots, onions, turnips, parsnips, tomatoes, green beans, butter beans, peas, mustard greens, kale, scallions, sweet potatoes, yellow summer squash, zucchini, butternut squash, cauliflower, broccoli, mushrooms, cucumbers, asparagus, bell peppers (called mangoes by older rural Kentuckians), banana peppers, cabbage, beets, eggplant, garlic and avocados.

=== Fruits ===
Blackberries, peaches, apples, watermelon, cantaloupe, pears, plums, grapes, cherries, pawpaws and persimmons.

=== Nuts ===
Walnuts, pecans, almonds, peanuts and cashews.

=== Grains ===
Oats, corn and sorghum.

=== Meats ===
- Chicken
- Beef
- Turkey
- Catfish
- Venison
- Ham and pork such as barbecued pork shoulder
- Mutton
- Rabbit
- Squirrel
- Turtle (though this is more seldom than other meats)

=== Flavorings ===
- Bourbon and whiskey

== Pit barbecue ==
The Ohio River region of western Kentucky, Daviess, Henderson and Union counties (the area centering on Owensboro and Henderson) has developed a unique style of pit barbecue, featuring a heavy dose of vinegar-based sauces, often served with pickles, onions, potato salad and coleslaw. The three main meats used are chicken, pork and mutton. Burgoo is a specialty. Owensboro is home to the International Bar-B-Q Festival, which is a sanctioned barbecue competition.

Farther to the west, in the Purchase area, pit barbecue is primarily pork shoulder, with the unmodified word "barbecue" referring specifically to that meat. The other meats used in the Owensboro–Henderson area are generally available as well. Sauces are essentially identical in the two regions.

== See also ==
- Kentucky wine
- Kentucky Common Beer

== Sources ==
- Domine, David. 111 Fabulous Food Finds: Best Bites in the Bluegrass. McClanahan Publishing House, 2011. ISBN 978-1-934898-12-3.
- Domine, David. Adventures in New Kentucky Cooking with the Bluegrass Peasant. McClanahan Publishing House, 2007. ISBN 0-913383-97-X.
- Domine, David. A Feast for the Eyes. McClanahan Publishing House, 2010. ISBN 978-1934898093.
- Domine, David. Insiders' Guide to Louisville (Insiders' Guide Series). Globe Pequot, 2010. ISBN 978-0762756957.
- Domine, David. Splash of Bourbon, Kentucky's Spirit. McClanahan Publishing House, 2010. ISBN 978-1-934898-06-2.
