= Rolled oyster =

Seafood dish from Louisville Kentucky, United States

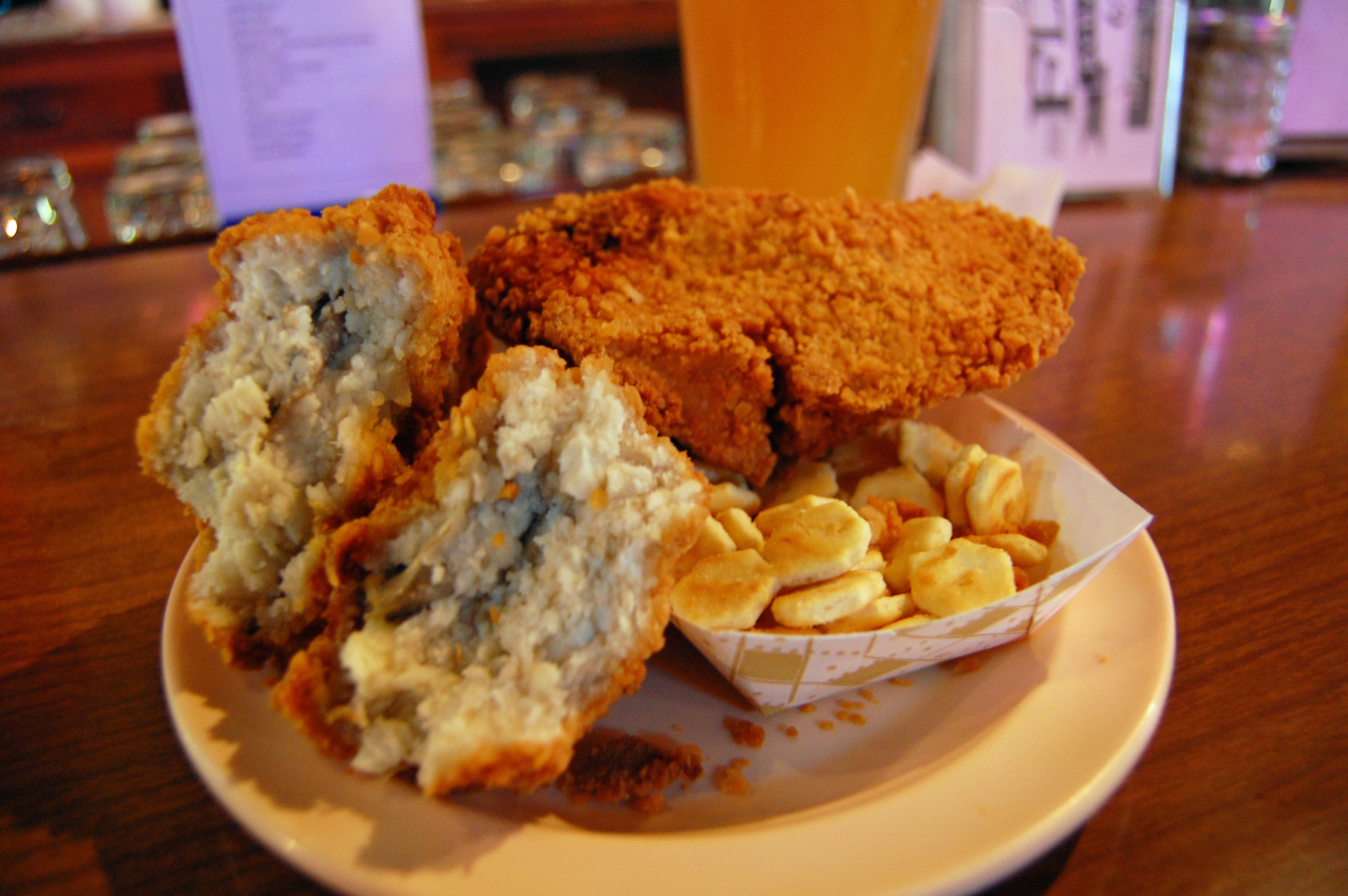
- Rolled oysters
- Place of origin: Louisville, Kentucky, United States
- Region or state: the South
- Created by: Phillip Mazzoni and his brothers
- Main ingredients: three raw oysters, egg-milk cornmeal batter (pastinga), cracker crumbs (hence the name)

Rolled oyster is a baseball-sized seafood dish that is found only in and around Louisville, Kentucky. It consists of three raw oysters dipped in an egg-milk cornmeal batter called pastinga, rolled in cracker crumbs (hence the name), and deep fried. They were first served by Italian immigrant Phillip Mazzoni and his brothers in the late 19th century as a free giveaway to their saloon patrons with a purchased beer or whiskey. It is unknown if rolled oysters were actually invented by the Mazzonis, or if the recipe was brought over from Italy with them. During prohibition, Mazzoni's remained open by selling these oysters in their new restaurant and it became a popular food item all over town. Today, most seafood restaurants and fish fries in the Louisville area will have their own version of these on their menus.

== See also ==
- Cuisine of Kentucky
