= Derby pie =

American pie

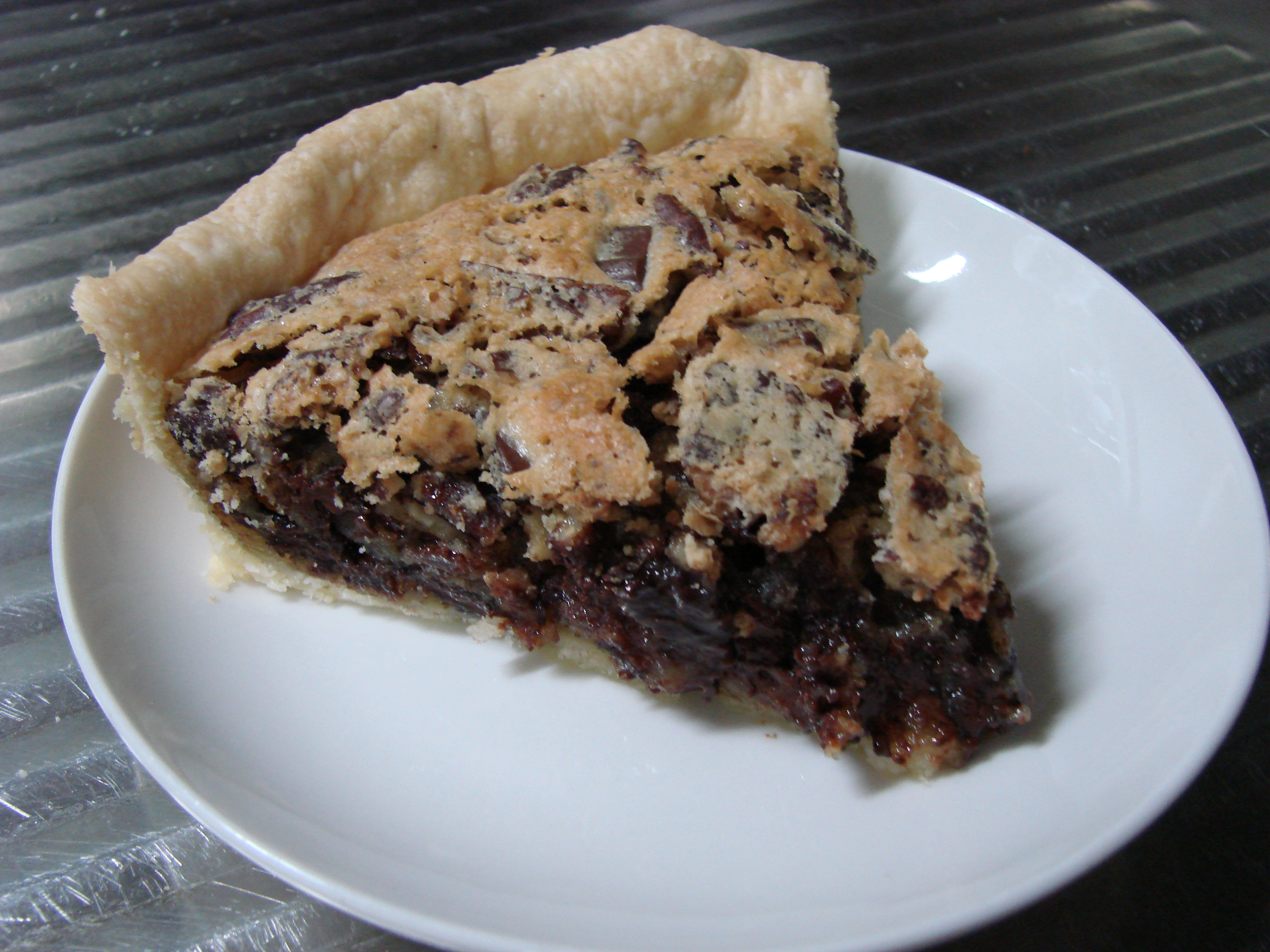
- Type: Custard pie
- Place of origin: United States
- Region or state: Kentucky
- Created by: George Kern
- Main ingredients: Pie dough, eggs, butter, brown sugar, sometimes corn syrup, chocolate, walnuts or pecans
- Other information: Official website

Derby pie is a chocolate and walnut open-faced custard pie baked in a (pre-baked) pie shell. The pie was created in the Melrose Inn of Prospect, Kentucky, United States, by George Kern with the help of his parents, Walter and Leaudra. It is often associated with the Kentucky Derby.

== History ==
Derby Pie was created in 1954 by the Melrose Inn in Prospect, Kentucky as a specialty pastry. The restaurant's owners and derby pie creators were Walter and Leaudra Kern, who constantly researched the optimal recipe for their creation. They were assisted by their son George Kern. The name "derby pie" was chosen because the various family members each had a different name for the creation, so to resolve the naming quandary they put the various names in a hat, and pulled out the paper which said "derby pie".

The name "derby pie" is a registered trademark of Kern's Kitchen, which registered the name in 1968. The company uses the name in the form "DERBY-PIE" in official literature and advertisements. The recipe is kept secret, known only to a small group of Kern family members and a single Kern's Kitchen employee (who actually mixes the recipe today). Kern's Kitchen diligently guards the trademark and has filed more than 25 lawsuits to protect it over the years. The makers of similar pies have had to use a different name such as "Pegasus pie", a reference to the Pegasus Parade at the Kentucky Derby Festival, and May Day pie, in reference to the First Saturday in May, the day of the Kentucky Derby.

After leaving the Melrose Inn in 1960, the Kern family continued to make derby pie for select customers. In 1969 they trademarked the name "derby pie" to both the state government of Kentucky and the United States Patent and Trademark Office. Since then, the trademark has constantly been renewed as a federally registered trademark. Alan Rupp, a grandson to Walter and Leaudra Kern, took over the derby pie business in 1973, he religiously defended the trademark. Part of this defense includes pursuing litigation against various cookbooks that named a similar pie derby pie. A federal judge in April 1982 ruled against a local cookbook, and demanded that the cookbook be recalled so the page with the derby pie recipe could be removed. The cooking magazine Bon Appetit won a temporary victory in May 1987 when a judge ruled the name "derby pie" generic, but the Sixth Circuit United States Court of Appeals reversed the decision, saying the Bon Appetit magazine "failed to introduce scientific survey evidence to support their assertion that the public views 'derby pie' as generic". Federal district courts have continued to side with Kern's Kitchen in this regard. Kern's attorney, Don Cox, estimated in 2008 that the company had sued to protect its trademark 25 times.

In May 2013, the Electronic Frontier Foundation inducted Kern's Kitchen into its "Takedown Hall of Shame," claiming that "the company behind the most litigious confection in America is going after individual websites that post new recipes for derby pies."

=== Lawsuit against Louisville, Kentucky, newspaper ===
DERBY-PIE owner Alan Rupp sent a letter to the Louisville Courier-Journal contending that an article published in 2017 and featuring a “Derby pie” recipe “constituted a knowing infringement on its trademark.” A few weeks later the newspaper published an article on a local baker who makes macaroons with the flavor “Derby Pie,” thus prompting Mr. Rupp to file his suit in a federal court in Kentucky.

The lower court dismissed all claims, writing in part that Mr. Rupp did “not plausibly establish that there is a risk of consumer confusion” between the trademarked DERBY-PIE and the home-made pie.

On January 11, 2021, a federal appeals court agreed, writing that “the Courier-Journal has used the phrase ‘Derby pie’ in a ‘wholly descriptive manner,’” and that “we can assuredly say that the Courier-Journal did not use ‘Derby pie’ in a trademark way.”

Mr. Rupp’s lawsuit also lacked a key ingredient: similarity, the court wrote, adding that it was the man’s “own evidence” that revealed that “no reader could possibly think that a so-called ‘Derby pie’ containing bourbon and no vanilla came from the company or companies associated with DERBY-PIE.”

== See also ==
- Chess pie
- Cuisine of Kentucky
- History of Louisville, Kentucky
- Pecan pie
