= Tom Bullock =

American bartender (1872–1964)

Tom Bullock (1872–1964) was an American bartender in the pre-Prohibition era. He was an African-American person.

He was born in Louisville, Kentucky, on October 18, 1872, one of at least three children of Thomas Bullock, his father, a former slave who fought for the Union Army, according to US Census records.

Bullock was a bartender at the Pendennis Club, the Kenton Club, on a railway car bar, and most notably the St. Louis Country Club, and is the first known African-American author to publish a cocktail manual, The Ideal Bartender. His book is notable as one of the last cocktail manuals published before Prohibition, providing a rare view onto pre-Prohibition cocktail recipes and drinking culture in America. Some writers believe that he appears to have ceased bartending with the onset of Prohibition; others believe that he continued to tend bar at the St. Louis Country Club or other private settings despite the legal prohibition.

Bullock was known to be a bartender and friend to George Herbert Walker, who wrote an introduction to his cocktail manual, writing "It is a genuine privilege to be permitted to testify to his qualifications for such a work." In 1913, he was involved in a libel case when ex-President Theodore Roosevelt sued for alleged libel regarding his drinking habits, and asserted he had only had a few sips of a mint julep cocktail made by Bullock. The St. Louis Post-Dispatch disputed Roosevelt's claim, asserting that no one could fail to finish one of Bullock's cocktails.

Bullock died in 1964.

Cocktail historian David Wondrich believes that Bullock may have been one of the first bartenders to create a variant of the gimlet, the Stone Sour.
