= Stack cake =

Layer cake from Appalachian cuisine

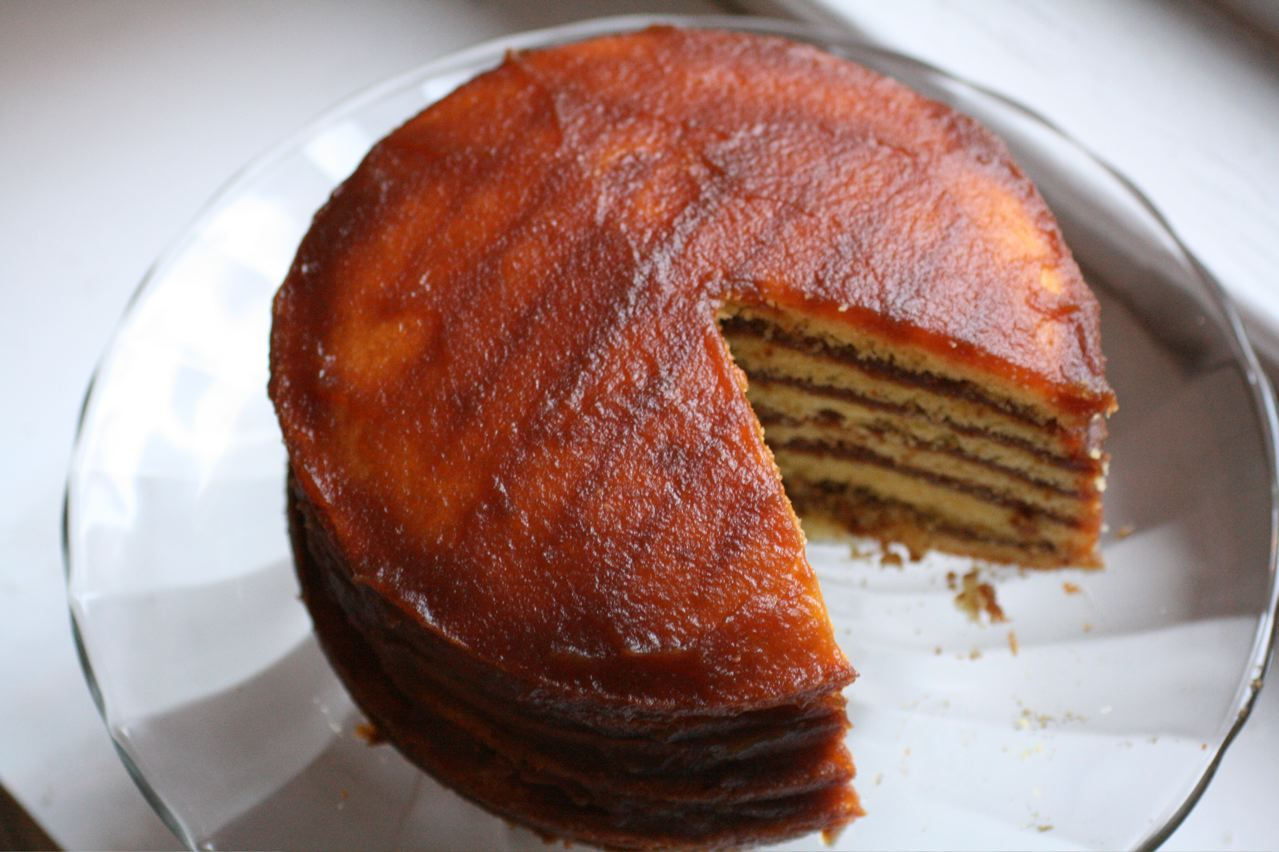
- Apple stack cake
- Alternative names: Dried apple stack cake, poor man's fruit cake, Confederates old-fashioned stack cake, Appalachian stack cake, Kentucky stack cake, Kentucky's washday cake
- Type: Cake
- Place of origin: United States
- Region or state: Appalachia
- Main ingredients: Apple preserves, dried apples, or apple butter

Stack cake, also called apple stack cake, is a stack of cakes layered with filling. Traditionally the cakes are made in a cast iron skillet, but they can be baked as well. The cake batter itself is made with molasses, and makes a crisp cake, similar to shortbread or biscuit. The apple filling for the cake can be made with applesauce, apple butter, apple jelly, or re-hydrated preserved apple rings, or other types of filling can be used such as apricot, date and raspberry. The cake is a specialty of Appalachian cuisine.

== Origin ==
An origin story proposed by Sidney Saylor Farr in 1983 is that stack cakes were a local substitute for layered wedding cake, which were prohibitively expensive. According to the legend, women would each donate a layer of cake, however, this is doubtful, because stack cakes require at least two days for the apple filling and cake flavors to combine. It's said that anyone eating the cake without waiting would wonder "what all the shouting was about".

Another proposed origin story is that James Harrod, eventual founder of Harrodsburg, Kentucky, brought stack cake from Pennsylvania to Kentucky, but the cake would not have gained popularity until flour became widely available, over 100 years later. There is no definitive account of the cake's origins.

== Description ==
Many types of cake layer recipes exist from sponge-like layers of cake to cookie dough-like ones; sometimes a stack cake includes many variations and flavors. One recipe from the Bluegrass region utilizes a sorghum molasses based gingerbread type cake. Stack cake parties that do not involve a wedding occur irregularly but typically serve as a way for people to exchange recipes and gossip. Its use is not limited to Kentucky cuisine but all of Appalachia.

In order to accommodate the typical seven or eight layers, each layer was sometimes pressed very flat. A few of the more common flavorings used were ginger, apple and molasses.

== See also ==
- Smith Island Cake - A stack cake of different origin

== Sources ==
- Kentucky Cuisine
- Recipe from Marthastewart.com
- History from Appalachian Heritage
- NYTimes Article on Layer Cakes
- Article title
- http://tennesseemountainstories.com/blog/2016/5/5/apple-stack-cake
- http://www.appalachianhistory.net/2012/10/stack-cake.html
