= Bernheim Arboretum and Research Forest =

Arboretum, forest, and nature preserve in Clermont, Kentucky, United States

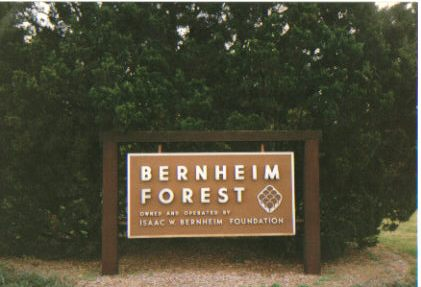
- Sign at the entrance of the forest
- Interactive map of Bernheim Arboretum and Research Forest
- Website: bernheim.org

Bernheim Forest and Arboretum, formerly Bernheim Arboretum and Research Forest, is a 16,346-acre (66.15 km^{2}) arboretum, forest, and nature preserve located in Clermont, Kentucky (25 miles south of Louisville, Kentucky, United States).

Bernheim was founded in 1929 by Isaac Wolfe Bernheim, a German immigrant and successful brewer whose whiskey distillery business established the I.W. Harper brand. He purchased the land in 1928 at $1 an acre because most of it had been stripped for mining iron ore. The Frederick Law Olmsted landscape architecture firm started work on designing the park in 1931 and it opened in 1950. Bernheim Forest was given to the people of Kentucky in trust and is the largest privately owned natural area in the state. Bernheim, his wife, daughter, and son-in-law are buried in the forest.

In 1988, at least one outside consulting firm was engaged and work on a new long-range plan for the forest was begun. One of the directives of the new strategic plan was to make the arboretum a primary focus. In addition, the forest decided to strengthen its research ties with institutions such as the University of Louisville. As a result, Bernheim Forest was renamed Bernheim Arboretum and Research Forest. However, most local visitors still refer to the property as "Bernheim Forest," and some of the signage located along surrounding roads still refer to the old name. In recent years, Bernheim has developed a strong volunteer program, added frequent public workshops and classes, and successfully hosts several large public events each year. These include the annual ColorFest in October, Bloomfest in May, CONNECT, an evening in August where art, science and nature converge in unexpected and funky ways, and a 5-mile (8.0 km) run/walk, held in October.

== Features ==
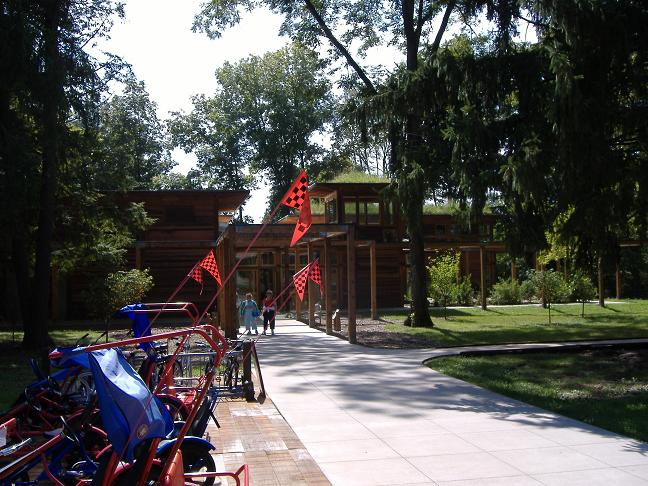
New Visitor Center

The property includes an arboretum and a natural area. The arboretum features formal and informal plant collections and various modern facilities, including handicapped accessible restrooms. Other arboretum features include numerous walking paths; a visitors' center, cafe, and gift shop; a 17-acre nature playground, and shelters, and four lakes. The natural area contains most of Bernheim's hiking trails, and is primarily a beech-maple forest with access via paved roads.

There are over 40 miles of hiking trails, including the 13.3 miles (21.4 km) Millennium Trail and the 3.2 miles (5.1 km) paved Hike-Bike Trail. One short trail, the aptly named Fire Tower Loop, leads to a metal observation tower that is often open to climb via stairs. The Canopy Tree Walk extends off a cliff and places the viewer above the trees for a wonderful vista. Hiking trails range in difficulty from "casual" short walks to strenuous jaunts designed for "the more serious hiker," per Bernheim's website. The Millennium Trail is by far the longest and most challenging; as a result Bernheim asks that hikers set out before certain times in the morning (the deadline varies by season), as well as register at the visitor center prior to starting the hike. In 2005, a hiker died of a heat stroke while attempting to complete the Millennium Trail.

The area also offers walking, running, hiking, picnicking, birdwatching, bicycling, plant identification, photography, fishing, and special events. Although overnight camping was once allowed in a designated campground, it is no longer permitted. Bernheim is dog friendly (dogs must remain on a leash at all times, and are prohibited in certain areas).

Programs for schools and other groups are offered throughout the year (advanced reservations are required). In 2005, a new visitor center was opened and is considered to be a revolutionary eco-friendly design. Designed by the architecture firm William McDonough + Partners, the center is constructed of recycled materials and has live plantings on the roof. The parking lot for the center was specifically located so that mushrooms could absorb contaminants that cars emit so they would not affect the water streams nearby. Glass and garden spaces are integrated into the design scheme. The building was awarded the Green Building Council's Leadership in Energy and Environmental Design Platinum (LEED) rating.

Bernheim offers memberships that include year-round admission; discounts on educational programs, and annual events; free entrance into many other national gardens through the Reciprocal Admission Program by American Horticultural Society; and subscription to a quarterly newsletter. Entrance is free for everyone. For non-members, a donation is requested and they recommend $15. There is a $100 Environmental Impact Fee for buses.

In 2019, Bernheim added three "forest giants" created by the Danish artist Thomas Dambo, which have attracted many new visitors to the Arboretum. These "forest giants" were created out of only recycled wood as to reduce the environmental impact.

== Isaac W. Bernheim's vision ==
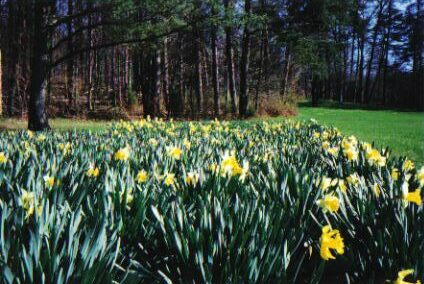
Daffodils in bloom near the Big Prairie Overlook in Bernheim's arboretum

Before his death, Bernheim laid out his goals for the forest in a letter to the trustees and directors of the I. W. Bernheim Foundation. That letter, dated August 30, 1939, set the following goals:

- "No discussion of religion or politics, no trading or trafficking..."
- "No distinction will be shown between rich or poor, white or colored."
- "My vision embraces an edifice, beautiful in design, which will rise at some carefully selected spot within the area. It may be made of marble or of native stone... Within it there will be an art gallery... Therein there will be busts in bronze of men and women whose names have risen to places of distinctive honor in Kentucky — a lasting and ever-present inspiration to the youths who gaze upon their faces."
- "A museum of natural history containing specimens of every animal that is classified in the wild life of this hemisphere will be provided for."
- "... a tall steel pole rearing its top far from the ground, and from it will float the American Flag, to be the center at intervals of patriotic gatherings, especially of children, who will be retold the story of liberty."
- "To all I send the invitation to come... to re-create their lives in the enjoyment of nature... in the park which I have dedicated to the use of the people, and which I hope will be kept for ever free."

Bernheim was a visionary, and he wrote that "nothing is static in this world". He understood the changing nature of the world, and the need for changing thought in the context of time. A wildlife museum such as was described by Bernheim did at once exist, but has been re-arranged in recent years to serve as an administrative/education center, and static wildlife exhibits have mostly been removed. A large area of the Great Meadow contains native long grass and a very successful quail program has been established to repopulate the region with quail.

Bernheim had a vision that art can heighten and expand experiences in nature. There are fifteen sculptures located throughout the arboretum, an active Artist in Residence Program, and a program called Sited@Bernheim, which supports site-specific installations and sculpture. The Artist in Residence program typically offers housing and a stipend to artists who work in ways that are in keeping with the aspects of Bernheim Arboretum and Research Forest's mission of "connecting people with nature". Artists interact with the public in workshops, demonstrations or other activities as well as sharing finished pieces found throughout the arboretum. Past artists have worked in photography, painting, sculpture, video, performance, and the written word. Temporary and permanent sculptures are located throughout the arboretum.

Bernheim wrote in his 1939 letter that "the grave has no voice". But, he went on to say "may I not express the hope and fervent prayer that my wishes outlined in its different sections be respected as much as humanly possible". In his 1929 autobiography, "The Closing Chapters of a Busy Life," Bernheim also wrote that "I am comforted in the firm belief that the good a man does lives after him."

== Arboretum ==
The property includes a 600-acre arboretum containing over 1,900 labeled species and cultivars of trees, shrubs, and other plants. The arboretum includes over 185 cultivars of American holly species. Other major collections include maples, crab apples, conifers (including dwarf conifers), oaks, buckeyes, ginkgoes, ornamental pears, and dogwoods. Specific attractions within the arboretum include the sun and shade trail, quiet garden, and garden pavilion. The original design for the arboretum was adopted in 1935, and has continued to be refined and improved over the years. In 1994, legislation was passed designating Bernheim as Kentucky's official arboretum. As is the case in most arboreta, the collection of leaves or clippings is not permitted.

The arboretum's holly collection is among the best in North America. It is officially named the Buddy Hubbuch Holly Collection, after Clarence E. "Buddy" Hubbuch Jr. (deceased as of 2000), Bernheim's first horticulture director who oversaw the planting of the collection over his 33-year tenure (1962 to 1995). It contains more than 700 specimens representing more than 350 individual species and cultivars from all across the northern hemisphere. These include 176 American Holly (Ilex opaca) cultivars, 44 selections of Japanese Holly (Ilex crenata), more than 50 cultivars of deciduous hollies (Ilex decidua, Ilex verticillata, Ilex serrata, and hybrids), and 19 cultivars of Inkberry (I. glabra) along with many unique hybrids.

=== Landscape, architecture and outdoor sculpture at Bernheim ===
The design of the landscape and buildings at Bernheim, as well as the sculpture and art found throughout the arboretum, aims to enhance humans' relationship with the natural environment and inspires the exploration of humans' deep connection with nature.

==== Landscape design of the arboretum ====
The world-renowned firm of Fredrick Law Olmstead was selected and commissioned in 1931 to design the arboretum. In accordance with the firm's recommendations; roadways, paths and natural areas were created, trees were planted, and farmland was restored to meadows, lawns and forest. Lakes, rivers and ponds were developed to provide "an enlivening effect". In 1950 Bernheim Forest was opened to the public. Continuous efforts are made to enhance the arboretum, the gardens and the natural areas by Bernheim's professional horticulture and natural areas departments.

In the mid-1960s, the gardens surrounding the Garden Pavilion and adjacent Quiet Garden were developed by landscape architecture firm Miller, Wihry and Brooks of Louisville. The gardens surrounding the Garden Pavilion were inspired by the cross-section of a clematis stem. The gardens were recently updated to reflect current Bernheim Select perennials as well as old garden favorites and include examples of cutting, shade and butterfly gardens.

==== Major structures within the arboretum ====
===== Event Center =====
Originally completed in 1962, this multi-functional building is sited on the old Jones Farm property. Silos from the original farm still stand near by. Today, it houses administrative offices and remains a well-used venue for events and programs. The adjunct gardens include shade and sun gardens and the Kingfisher Pond.

===== Garden Pavilion =====
Designed by the Louisville firm of Nevin & Morgan in 1961, the Garden Pavilion is a six-sided redwood structure located on Lake Nevin and reflects a mid-century modern style. It is surrounded by a vine-covered pergola, which cools the building in the summer. The building is the center of the clematis stem shaped configuration. The Garden Pavilion is available year-round for weddings, meetings and gatherings.

===== Research building =====
The Research Center opened in 2004, providing office space and research facilities for horticulture and forest management and meeting space for scientific research. Global Change, bird migration, insects, amphibians, small mammals, and grassland grazing as well as stream restoration are currently being studied. The cultivation of selected perennial and tree species take place in greenhouses within the complex.

===== Visitors center =====
The Visitor Center opened to the public in 2005. Designed by William McDonough, Partners of Charlottesville, Virginia, and Barnett and Bagley Architects of Lexington, it was conceived as a "building like a tree" with pergolas, arbors and living roof, along with other design feature that reflect the ecology of Kentucky, created to connect to its sense of place. It has received numerous awards including the Platinum level of the LEED certification program.

===== The Intergenerational Grisby Shelter =====
Located in the Children's Play Garden, five structures support large, living green roof boxes while providing seating, shelter and shade. Their contemporary design incorporates columns made from recycled trees found within the forest.

===== Bernheim Lookout =====
Bernheim Fire Lookout was constructed in 1929 by the Kentucky Division of Forestry. It is a 48' tall Aermotor tower with a 7'x7' metal cab. The lookout was regularly staffed until 1980. In 1986 it was used to monitor a wild fire. It was designated as a historical lookout on April 22, 1998, by the National Historical Lookout Register. Restoration and management is now handled by the Bernheim Foundation with help from the local community and the University of Kentucky.

==== Art in Nature ====
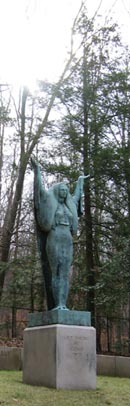
Bronze statue "Let There Be Light" by the artist George Grey Barnard, located at the grave site of Mr. and Mrs. Isaac Wolfe Bernheim.

The Art in Nature program provides a platform for artistic experimentation and exploration that becomes a part of the entire ecosystem of Bernheim and inspires humans' deep connections with nature. Its programs include the Artist in Residence Program, Sited @ Bernheim, Local Use by Local Artists and CONNECT. In addition, the following sculptures have been donated to Bernheim throughout its history:

1. Snake Hollow by Patrick Dougherty, 2012 – Patrick Dougherty's environmentally friendly sculpture alludes to the myths of snakes and labyrinths. This primitive building material and method is utilized as the artist created this engaging sculptural installation. The artist, with the aid of over 50 volunteers, created this piece over a three-week period in April 2012. Constructed solely out of willow saplings, the weaving of branches creates an effortless effect as if the form has grown naturally within its setting. It would last two years before being chipped up and returned to the earth. This was the first Sited @ Bernheim project. These projects occur every two years.
2. Earth Measure by Matt Weir, 2013 – Weir created the sculpture in honor of Barry Bingham Jr.'s life and service. Bingham, the former publisher of the Louisville Courier-Journal and Louisville Times who guided the publications to win three Pulitzer Prizes, was also an avid environmentalist, photographer, and supporter of Bernheim Forest. He served on the Bernheim Board of Trustees from 1970 to 2006 and chaired the capital campaign for the Platinum LEED Visitor Center and related projects. Constructed entirely out of more than a ton of solid stacked limestone blocks, Earth Measure aims to inspire the visitor to explore notions of science, geometry, sound, and architecture while deepening one's connection with nature. When Weir was commissioned three years earlier to create a sculpture, he researched Bingham and conducted interviews, digging deep into the principles that were important to both Barry Bingham Jr. and to Bernheim Forest. The Earth Measure aims to invite discovery, pose questions, and to place the visitor in a meadow, encouraging them to tune into acoustic ecology and soundscape science. The sculpture both frames the environment through its "lens" and captures the sounds of seasonal wildlife through audio waves directed to the center of the listening dome or parabolic sphere. Earth Measure also fulfills Isaac Wolfe Bernheim's deepest intention for the gift he gave the people of Kentucky, when he established the arboretum and research forest.
3. Hello by Russell Vogt, 2009 – Russ Vogt, a former resident of Louisville, is both painter and sculptor. His work can be characterized as demonstrating a passion for both material and process. Vogt's ceramic sculpture utilizes a rich palette of ceramic glazes that range from deep blues and greens to hot orange and reds. The forms are often whimsical and made of handmade mosaic tile shards that cover an underlying armature. It was given as an anonymous donation.
4. Untitled by Jerry Bleem, 2002 – Jerry Bleem, a Chicago sculptor, was an Artist in Residence in 2002. His work transforms everyday discarded materials and reinvents them. This piece is a locally cast bronze of a form created by using thousands of staples to create this anthropomorphic shape.
5. Untitled by Heike Endemann, 2011 – Heike Endemann has three pieces at Bernheim. As one of the 2011 Artists in Residence, she utilized fallen logs, in a variety of species, and a chain saw to create these abstract sculptures. They are located in the Holly Pond, outside the Education Center and in the Education Center.
6. Cluster III, Ernest Shaw, 1976 – Ernest Shaw, New York painter and sculptor created a 3-piece sculpture in Cor-Ten steel. Nestled in the Holly Collection, this large, abstract sculpture forms three points of a triangle. Over the last four decades, Shaw produced a body exploring a variety of different mediums and techniques and challenging the fundamental concepts of balance, composition, gravity, compression and expansion. It was given as an anonymous donation.
7. Let There be Light, by George Grey Barnard – This bronze statue of a woman with uplifted arms by world-renowned sculptor, George Grey Barnard, is mounted on a granite base at the gravesite of Mr. and Mrs. Isaac W. Bernheim. She stands above a stone semi-circle and is flanked by granite pylons representing the Jewish and Christian religions. A bronze plaque is mounted at ground level at the base of the stairs that lead up to the statue. It reads: "May light, the symbol of life and truth, illumine the paths of good citizenship and reason, and tolerance and fairness guide our relationship with our fellow men."
8. An 11-foot tall statue of Lincoln, created in 1917 at the commission of Charles P. Taft, stands in Lytle Park in downtown Cincinnati. A second casting of the Lincoln statue stands in Manchester, England (1919). A third copy (1922) stands in Louisville, on the lawn of the Free Public Library. The statue, funded by Mr. and Mrs. Isaac Bernheim was dedicated October 26, 1922.
9. Untitled by Paul Fields – This abstracted, organic form, carved in limestone was originally started in Louisville and finished on site by Bernheim's first Artist in Residence in 1980. A renowned Kentucky sculptor, Paul was recognized internationally for his stone and wood abstract sculptures. The artist was responsible for starting a number of sculptors in stone – Don Lawler, Matt Weir, Mike Ratterman and Larry Beisler are among them.
10. Untitled by Paul Fields – This abstracted "blossom" form sculpture by Paul Fields was dedicated on November 16, 2003, in honor of the artist's mother, and donated to Bernheim by the Fields family. It sits on the Lake Nevin Loop Trail just off the main drive into Bernheim.
11. Emerging by Meg White, 1988 – The artist is a self-taught sculptor who discovered the three-dimensional process through paper sculpture. In 1991, Meg discovered stone carving at Don Lawler's studio and began to create wildlife and figurative works on a full-time basis. Meg now produces limited edition bronzes as well as small and monumental-scale works in stone. Varley E. Wiedeman donated the sculpture in memory of ornithologist, fellow faculty member at U of L, and former Bernheim board member, Dr. Burt Monroe.
12. Hymn to Justice – Located on Tablet Hill near the main entrance to Bernheim Arboretum and Research Forest is a stanza from one of Pierson Merrill's songs, Not Alone for Mighty Empire. It is a call to his nation (applicable to any nation) to set righteous priorities. William Pierson Merrill was an American Presbyterian clergyman, who served in Philadelphia, Chicago and New York. Considered an outstanding preacher, he was also an author and a hymn writer. It commemorates Mr. Bernheim's love and respect for all humanity. It reads: "God of justice, save the people from the clash of race and creed, from the strife of class and friction. Make our nation free indeed. Keep our faith in simple manhood strong as when her life began till it finds its full fruition in the brotherhood of man." – William Pierson Merrill
13. Untitled, by Tom Butch, 1988 – Located beside Lake Nevin near the Quiet Garden, this abstract red steel sculpture was commissioned by Al and Vicki Mattox as a memorial to their son. Its design includes universal joints that originally allowed it to be multi-positional, participatory and playful in nature. It now stands in a sedentary position and suggested forms are found by walking around it.
14. Our Precious Forest by Karl Ciesluk, 1988
15. Stricken by Karl Ciesluk, 1988
16. Ying Yang by Karl Ciesluk, 1988
17. In 1998, Artist-in-Residence Karl Ciesluk created numerous works of art throughout Bernheim. The pieces are scattered throughout the forest and arboretum to become delights of discovery as it is explored. Each piece is composed of tiny-mirrored squares, creating a glittering effect and reflection of its surrounding.

== Conservation and ecology ==
With a $500,000 grant for stream restoration from the U.S. EPA, the University of Louisville Stream Institute bulldozed the 4,000 feet (1,200 m) riparian corridor of Wilson Creek in order to return a meandering course to the channel which had been straightened in the past to allow for farming. Native trees and wildflowers were planted, and fish populations increased. In 2011 beavers returned and their dams have removed sediment, adding clarity to the streamwater. Also their ponds have attracted birds, amphibians, reptiles, raccoon, and river otters.

== See also ==
- List of attractions and events in the Louisville metropolitan area
- List of botanical gardens in the United States
- National Register of Historic Places listings in Bullitt County, Kentucky
