= James E. Pepper =

American whiskey brand

- Industry: Liquor
- Headquarters: Lexington, Kentucky, U.S.
- Key people: Elijah Pepper, Oscar Pepper, James E. Pepper
- Products: Bourbon and rye whiskey
- Website: jamesepepper.com

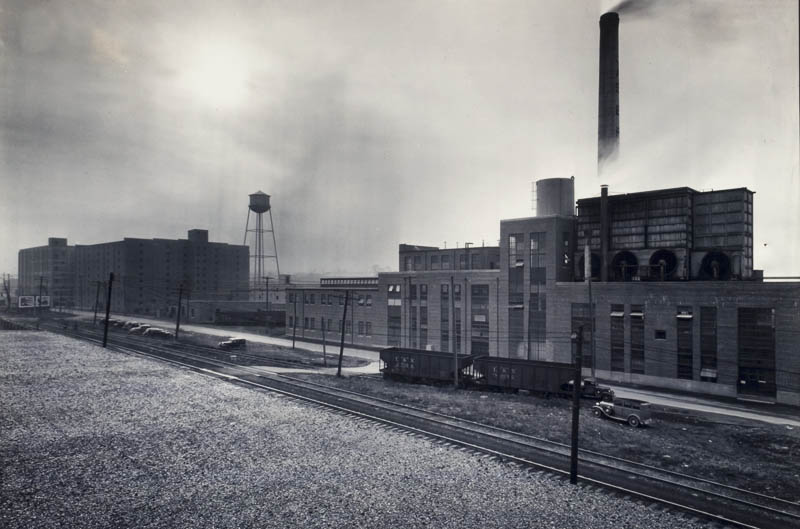

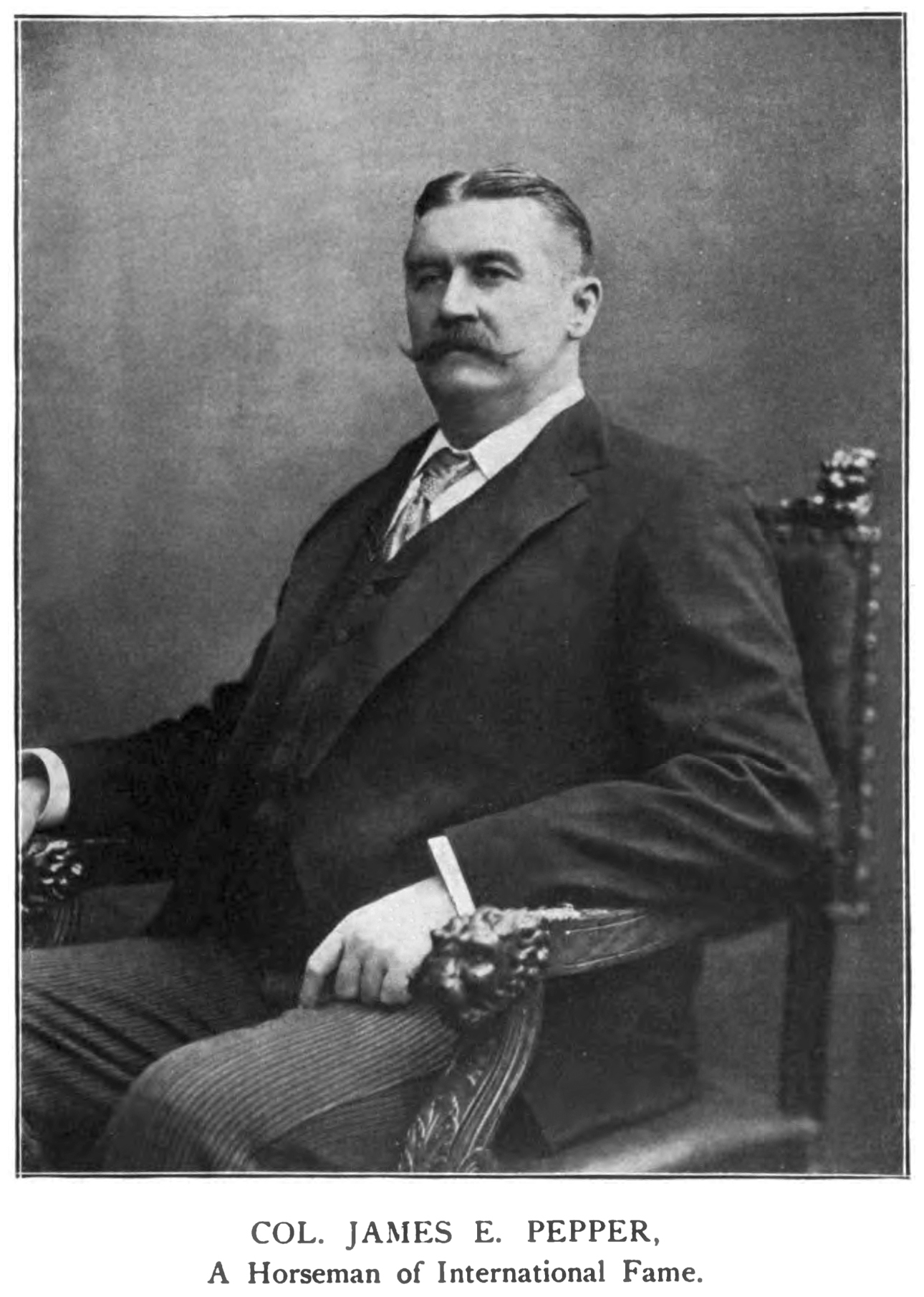
James E. Pepper

James E. Pepper is an American whiskey brand. The brand is named after a historic American whiskey maker with that name who built and operated a distillery in Lexington, Kentucky, and marketed his whiskey under his family's brand name "Old Pepper" and under his own name. The brand's distillery, known as the Henry Clay distillery and later as the Old Pepper distillery and James E. Pepper distillery, was shut down in 1967 and was left abandoned for more than 50 years until Amir Peay (an entrepreneur with no relationship to the prior brand owners) purchased the historic distillery site and relaunched the brand name in 2008. Distilling resumed at the site in 2017.

== Biography ==
James E. Pepper (May 10, 1850 – 1906), Master Distiller and Kentucky Colonel, was a bourbon industrialist and flamboyant promoter of his family brand. He was the third generation to produce "Old Pepper" whisky, "The Oldest and Best Brand of Whisky made in Kentucky", founded in 1780 during the American Revolution. He claimed that his distillery, the Old Pepper Distillery in Lexington, Kentucky, was the oldest in the United States and the largest in the world, and that it made the best whiskey in the United States.

An avid and noted horseman, Pepper operated one of the most regarded stables in Kentucky and paid at the time the highest amount ever per acre for a bluegrass horse farm. His thoroughbreds competed in the Kentucky Derby and various other races across the United States and throughout Europe. He traveled in an ornate private rail car named "The Old Pepper", painted with images of his famed whiskey label, and he spent a considerable amount of time in Manhattan, where he would travel to promote his brand.

During his visits to New York, often at the Waldorf-Astoria Hotel, Pepper frequently socialized with various American captains of industry, including John Jacob Astor, Francis G. du Pont, Thomas Eckert, Pierre Lorillard IV, Levi P. Morton, Fred Pabst, Charles A. Pillsbury, John D. Rockefeller, Theodore Roosevelt, William Steinway, Charles L. Tiffany, and Cornelius Vanderbilt. It was at the Waldorf that Pepper helped to popularize the "Old Fashioned" cocktail, which was said to have been invented by a bartender at the famed Pendennis Club in Louisville.

Pepper was a staunch advocate for his whiskey business. He was a vocal opponent of the infamous "Whisky Trust" of the 1890s. In 1890 he got the state of Kentucky to change its laws so that he could bottle his own whisky at his distillery. Before the changes in the law, distillers could only sell their whiskey by the barrel, and if their product was bottled it was because whoever purchased the barrel from the distillery did the bottling. (The Old Forester brand had earlier introduced the idea of selling a whiskey brand only in bottles, but the Old Forester brand was produced by a "rectifier" rather than a distiller.) He introduced the idea of a strip stamp with his signature on it to go across the cork, sealing the bottle. He then advertised that if this signature was damaged, the consumer should be wary of purchasing the bottle because someone may have tampered with the whiskey, and it may not contain real Pepper whiskey. The strip stamp became popular and the government used the idea when they passed the Bottled-in-Bond Act of 1897.

Pepper proudly proclaimed his continued use of his grandfather's original Revolutionary‐era recipes, and as such nicknamed his whisky "Old 1776".

== Distillery ==
- James E. Pepper Distillery
- U.S. National Register of Historic Places
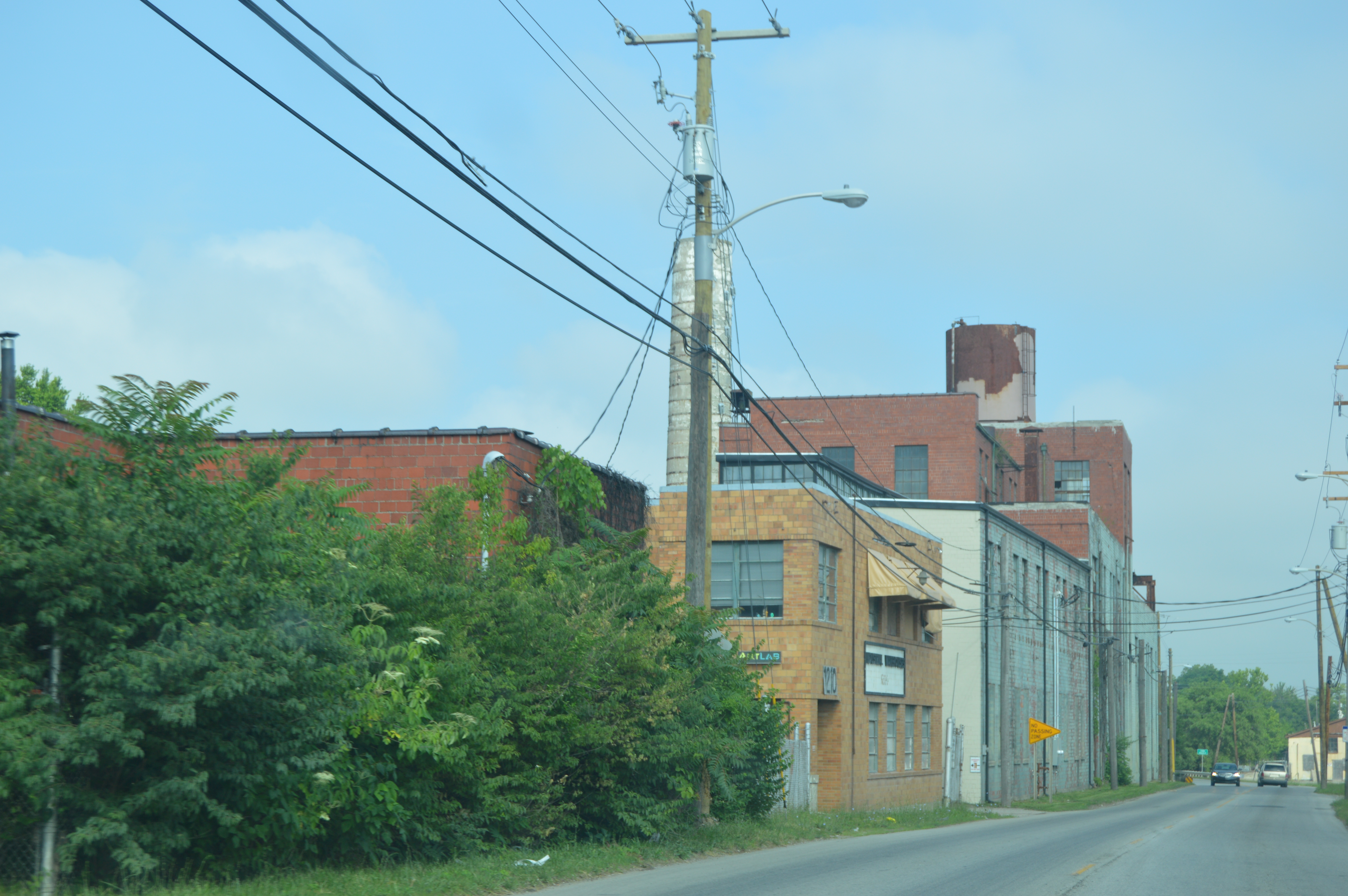
- The distillery buildings in 2014

- Location within Kentucky Location within the United States
- Location: 1200 Manchester St., Lexington, Kentucky
- Coordinates: 38°3′24″N 84°31′12″W
- NRHP reference No.: 09000006
- Added to NRHP: February 11, 2009

The brand's distillery site originally became a distillery in the 1800s, and was known as the Henry Clay distillery (registered distillery DSP-KY-5). It became a large commercial distillery at a time when long-distance transportation of goods by steamship and railroad networks had become practical and the Internal Revenue Act of 1862, passed to raise funds for the Civil War, had imposed an excise tax on alcohol production that forced many smaller producers out of the business. This post-Civil War period would later be sometimes called the "Golden Age of Distilling". Although a number of other producers were then driven out of the business by competition, overproduction, and a reduction in demand brought about by the temperance movement, the distillery continued operating until around 1917 when austerity measures related to World War I shut down production and were followed by the Eighteenth Amendment to the United States Constitution and the Volstead Act, which brought about the era of Prohibition in the United States.

During Prohibition, the site was selected as one of the few places for authorized warehousing of liquor stocks under the Liquor Concentration Act of 1922, and sales of whiskey for medicinal purposes also allowed the brand to continue to be bottled, although the distilling equipment was mothballed. As early as 1890, the Old Pepper brand had been advertised as a medicinal treatment for diverse ailments including malaria and consumption, and the brand was placing advertisements in drug stores for medicinal uses by the 1910s. This allowed the brand's name recognition and some of its bottling operations to survive through a period when many producers were shut down and became unable to recover. In 1923, the James E. Pepper brand was being marketed to pharmacists, and was endorsed by more than 40,000 physicians, commanding a price six times higher than before Prohibition began. In October 1929, as warehoused inventory dwindled, some distilling was allowed to resume at the Stitzel-Weller distillery and was used as a source for the brand's bottling operation. The approaching end of Prohibition brought about a period of heavy investment in large production facilities, and the distillery was purchased around 1934 by Schenley Industries, just as large-scale operation was able to resume. Schenley was the largest distiller in the United States during 1934–1937. A few years later, austerity measures enacted during World War II would again shut down nearly all whiskey production in the United States until after the war ended in 1945. During this period the distillery was converted to the production of industrial alcohol. After the war, the distillery resumed liquor production on a large scale, and as the Korean War approached, it ramped up its production further, as the managers anticipated that the war might cause production to be forced to shut down again. This led to excess inventory of stored whiskey. Distilling was then curtailed while inventory was drawn down. Further consolidation of the industry caused on-site distilling operations to cease altogether in 1958.

The distillery was listed in the National Register of Historic Places in February 2009 as James E. Pepper Distillery, with a recognized period of historic significance of 1934–1958, due to its local importance as the only largely intact example of a post-Prohibition distillery facility in Fayette County, Kentucky (although as early as 1810 there had once been as many as 140 distilleries operating in the Lexington area).

== 21st century ==
Entrepreneur Amir Peay relaunched the brand name in 2008. He spent over a decade doing historic research on the brand and collecting historic materials and whiskey, and had the new still system designed and built to resemble the original mechanical engineering drawings from the last system built in 1934. The new still system was built by Vendome Copper in Louisville, the same company that built that system in 1934. The new distillery began operating on the historic site on December 21, 2017, running the same historic bourbon mash bill as when the plant closed in 1967 and drawing water from the historic distillery well. Peay has published many of the historic documents and materials on his website and social media pages, and built a museum at the historic distillery.

After the European Union placed tariffs on American whiskey in 2018, James E. Pepper lost three-quarters of its foreign business, as its prices became too high for most consumers.

== The Old Fashioned cocktail ==
James E. Pepper is credited with popularizing the drink known as the Old Fashioned cocktail, which was said to have been invented by a bartender at the Pendennis Club in Louisville, Kentucky. Pepper introduced the drink to the Waldorf-Astoria Hotel bar in New York City.

== See also ==
- List of historic whisky distilleries
