= List of regional dishes of the United States =

The cuisine of the United States includes many regional or local dishes, side dishes and foods. This list includes dishes and foods that are associated with specific regions of the United States.

== Regional dishes of the United States ==
Image	Name	General Region	Associated regions	Description
American chop suey	American chop suey	Northeast	New England	An American dish of elbow macaroni, ground beef, tomato sauce, seasonings, and sometimes grated cheese.
American goulash	American goulash	Multiple	Midwestern United States and Southern United States	A dish that is similar to American chop suey, consisting of pasta (such as macaroni or egg noodles), ground beef, tomatoes or tomato sauce, and seasonings. Some variations include cheese.
Arizona cheese crisp	Arizona cheese crisp	Southwest	Arizona	An open-faced flour tortilla with grated cheese and sometimes additional ingredients on top, baked until both the tortilla and the cheese are crisp.
Baked ziti	Baked ziti	Northeast	New York City	A baked pasta casserole made of ziti, bechamel, ragù, and a cheese topping.
Biscuits and gravy	Biscuits and gravy	South	Southern United States	Soft dough biscuits, generally split into halves and covered in either sawmill or sausage gravy.
Boiled peanuts	Boiled peanuts	South	Southern United States	Peanuts that have been boiled. Often made with peanuts grown in gardens and small patches throughout the South.
Tacos, rice, and borracho beans	Borracho beans	Southwest	Texas	Pinto beans cooked with beef, pork or bacon, and spices such as onions, garlic, and jalapeño peppers. A Tex-Mex dish; the name means "drunken beans".
Boston baked beans being served with a ladle	Boston baked beans	Northeast	Boston, Massachusetts	A variety of baked beans, typically sweetened with molasses or maple syrup and flavored with salt pork or bacon.
Breakfast burrito	Breakfast burrito	Southwest	New Mexico	A flour tortilla filled with breakfast items such as eggs, bacon, sausage, potatoes, and cheese, served "smothered" (with chili sauce on top) or "hand-held".
Cactus fries	Cactus fries	Southwest	New Mexico	Fried prickly pear cactus.
Cheese straws	Cheese straws	South	Southern United States	A savory biscuit-like snack made with flour, butter, salt, cheddar cheese, and cayenne pepper; sometimes the dough is extruded through a cookie press before being baked
Chicken fried bacon	Chicken fried bacon	Southwest	Texas	Bacon strips dredged in batter and deep fried, like chicken fried steak.
Chimichanga	Chimichanga	Southwest	Arizona	A deep-fried burrito, usually made with a flour tortilla and various fillings such as beans, rice, cheese, and some type of meat.
Chitterlings	Chitterlings	South	Southern United States	A food most commonly made from the small intestines of pigs, though beef, lamb, goose and goat are also used, especially by Black American Muslims.
Cincinnati chili	Cincinnati chili	Midwest	Cincinnati, Ohio	A Mediterranean-spiced meat sauce used as a topping with spaghetti (a "two-way"), with cheese (a "three-way") and onions or beans (a "four-way" with one, a "five-way" with both), or on hot dogs ("coneys"), dishes developed by Macedonian immigrant restaurateurs in the 1920s.
A package of all-pork city chicken and wooden skewers, ready to be cooked	City chicken	Multiple	Pittsburgh, PA; Ohio; Michigan; Indiana	Cubes of meat (usually pork) which have been placed on a wooden skewer (approximately 4–5 inches (10–13 cm) long), then fried or baked.
	Cowboy beans	Southwest	Southwestern United States	Consists of beans and ground beef in a sweet and tangy sauce
Egg roll	Egg roll	Northeast	New York City	A cylindrical, savory roll with shredded cabbage, chopped meat, or other fillings inside a thickly wrapped wheat flour skin, which is fried in hot oil.
Eggs Sardou with grits and shrimp	Eggs Sardou	South	New Orleans	Poached eggs, artichoke bottoms, creamed spinach, and hollandaise sauce, sometimes with other ingredients such as anchovies or chopped ham.
Fajita	Fajita	Southwest	Texas	Strips of grilled skirt steak or chicken, cooked with sauteed onions and bell peppers and served on a flour or corn tortilla
Fried cheese curds	Fried cheese curds	Midwest	Wisconsin	Cheese curds that are battered and deep fried.
Fried green tomatoes	Fried green tomatoes	South	Southern United States	Unripe tomatoes, sliced, coated with cornmeal, and fried.
Fried okra	Fried okra	South	Southern United States	Okra that has been covered in cornmeal and fried.
Frito pie	Frito pie	Southwest	Southwestern United States	A dish made with chili, cheese, and corn chips (especially Fritos). Additions can include pico de gallo, refried beans, sour cream, onions, rice, and jalapeños.
A log of Goetta	Goetta	Midwest	Cincinnati, Ohio	Goetta (/ˈɡɛtə/ GHET-ə) is ground pork or beef mixed with steel-cut oats and seasonings, formed into a log, sliced, and fried. It originated in the Over-the-Rhine neighborhood of Cincinnati.
Grillades with grits	Grillades	South	Louisiana	Grillades (/ɡriːˈjɑːdz/ gree-YAHDZ) are fried or seared medallions of meat, usually beef, cooked with Creole-style vegetables and spices.
Grits	Grits	South	Southern United States	A porridge made from coarsely ground dried corn or hominy.
Ham loaf	Ham loaf	Northeast	Pennsylvania	A baked meat dish, similar to meatloaf, made of ground ham and ground pork and combined with other ingredients to form a loaf-like shape. Distinct in color and taste from meatloaf, ham loaf is often baked with a sweet glaze, often consisting of brown sugar, molasses, pineapples, or cherries.
Hog jowl	Hog jowl	South	Southern United States	A cut of pork from a pig's cheek.
A tater tot hotdish	Hotdish	Midwest	Minnesota	A variety of casserole which typically contains a starch, a meat or other protein, and a canned or frozen vegetable, mixed with canned soup
Hushpuppies	Hushpuppy	South	Southern United States	A savory food made from cornmeal batter that is deep fried or baked rolled as a small ball
Jalapeño poppers	Jalapeño poppers	Southwest	Southwestern United States	Jalapeño peppers that have been hollowed out, stuffed with a mixture of cheese, spices, and sometimes ground meat, and breaded and deep-fried.
Joe's Special	Joe's Special	West	San Francisco	A scramble of eggs, spinach and ground beef. Other common ingredients include onions, garlic and sometimes mushrooms, and various spices.
Johnny Marzetti	Johnny Marzetti	Midwest	Midwestern United States	A Midwestern Italian American pasta dish consisting of noodles, cheese, ground beef, and a tomato sauce that typically includes aromatic vegetables and mushrooms.
Lamb fries	Lamb fries	South	Kentucky	Deep fried lamb testicles.
Laulau (lower left) with rice and salad	Laulau	West	Hawaii	A traditional preparation consisting of pork wrapped in taro leaf
Livermush	Livermush	South	North Carolina	A dish made with pig liver and other parts mixed with cornmeal, formed into a loaf, and fried.
Machacado con huevo	Machacado con huevo	Southwest	Southwestern United States	A dish consisting of shredded dry beef that is scrambled with eggs.
Manapua	Manapua	West	Hawaii	The Hawaiian adaptation of the Chinese bun, baozi, derived specifically from char siu bao. In contemporary times, the term is generally also applied to a large char siu bao or other steamed, baked, or fried bao variations of different fillings.
Minnesota sushi	Minnesota sushi	Midwest	Midwestern United States	A wrap containing ham, cream cheese, and a pickle.
A Mission-style burrito, wrapped in aluminum foil, with tortilla chips and salsa	Mission burrito	West	San Francisco, California	A very large burrito filled with meat, beans, rice, and additional flavor-enhancing ingredients such as cheese, sour cream, guacamole, pico de gallo, or jalapeños. Typically served wrapped in aluminum foil.
Nachos	Nachos	Southwest	Southwestern United States	Tortilla chips or totopos covered with cheese or chile con queso, as well as a variety of other toppings and garnishes, often including meats (such as ground beef or grilled chicken), vegetables (such as chili peppers, lettuce, tomatoes, and olives), and condiments such as salsa, guacamole, or sour cream.
Natchitoches meat pies with beans and rice	Natchitoches meat pie	South	Louisiana	A dish in Louisiana creole cuisine, it is one of the official state foods of Louisiana, ingredients include ground beef, ground pork, onions, peppers, garlic, oil, and a pie shell
New England boiled dinner	New England boiled dinner	Northeast	New England	Corned beef or a smoked "picnic ham" shoulder, with cabbage and added vegetable items
Pasta primavera	Pasta primavera	Northeast	New York City	Pasta in a cream sauce and fresh vegetables.
Pasty	Pasty	Midwest	Upper Peninsula of Michigan	A baked pastry, a traditional variety of which is filled with beef, pork, lamb, or venison, with onions, potatoes, and carrots. Usually handheld with a crispy outer crust.
Pemmican	Pemmican	Midwest	Midwestern United States	A mixture of tallow, dried meat, and sometimes dried berries. A calorie-rich food, it can be used as a key component in prepared meals such as stews or eaten raw. Historically, it was an important part of indigenous cuisine in certain parts of North America and it is still prepared today
Pickled pigs' feet	Pickled pigs' feet	South	Southern United States	Pigs' feet that have undergone pickling.
Pimento cheese and crackers	Pimento cheese	South	Southern United States	A cheese spread made of cheddar cheese, mayonnaise, pimentos, and seasonings, served on crackers and vegetables or in sandwiches.
A pork roll sandwich	Pork roll	Northeast	New Jersey	Also known as Taylor Ham; a lightly smoked and cured pork product; usually eaten on a roll as a sandwich
Pudding corn	Pudding corn	Multiple	Southern United States and Appalachia	Also known as corn pudding. A savory, baked casserole made with corn kernels (and sometimes cornmeal), eggs, cream or milk, and other ingredients. Usually served as a side dish.
Roasted chestnuts	Roasted chestnuts	Northeast	New York City	Sold from pushcarts during New York City winters, primarily in Manhattan. A delicacy dating back to English Christmas traditions.
Rocky Mountain oysters	Rocky Mountain oysters	Southwest	Colorado	Deep fried bull testicles.
Schnitz un knepp	Schnitz un knepp	Northeast	Pennsylvania	A dish of ham or pork shoulder with dried apples and dumplings.
Scrapple	Scrapple	Multiple	Pennsylvania, Delaware	Traditionally, a mush of pork scraps and trimmings combined with cornmeal and wheat flour, often buckwheat flour, and spices
Slinger	Slinger	Midwest	St. Louis	A diner specialty typically consisting of two eggs, hash browns, and a beef patty, all covered in chili con carne and topped with cheese and onions.
Southern tomato pie	Southern tomato pie	South	Southern United States	A pie shell with a filling of tomatoes (sometimes with basil or other herbs), covered with a topping of grated cheese mixed with either mayonnaise or a white sauce.
Spaghetti and meatballs	Spaghetti and meatballs	Northeast	New York City	A pasta dish made with spaghetti, tomato, and meatballs.
Spoonbread, with a pork chop and greens	Spoonbread	South	Southern United States	A moist cornmeal-based dish, similar in consistency and taste to Yorkshire pudding. (Pictured is spoonbread underneath a pork chop, with a side of greens.)
Stromboli	Stromboli	Northeast	Philadelphia, Pennsylvania	A type of savory turnover filled with various cheeses, typically mozzarella, Italian meats such as salami, capicola and bresaola or vegetables, and traditionally wrapped in Italian bread dough. It was invented in 1950 at Romano's Pizzeria & Italian Restaurant in Essington, Pennsylvania, by Nazzareno "Nat" Romano.
Succotash made with corn and kidney beans	Succotash	Multiple	New England; Pennsylvania; Southern United States	A chunky dish that consists primarily of sweet corn with lima beans or other shell beans. Other ingredients may be added including tomatoes and green or sweet red peppers.
Tamale pie	Tamale pie	Southwest	Southwestern United States	A dish is made by lining a casserole dish with tamale dough and adding a spiced filling of meats, stews, or leftovers, sometimes with beans, salsa, or tomatoes. It is finally topped with more tamale dough and baked, sometimes with cheese on top.
Toasted ravioli	Toasted ravioli	Midwest	St. Louis, Missouri	A dish of breaded, deep-fried ravioli, found on the menus of many St. Louis restaurants including those of the Hill, a predominantly Italian neighborhood.
Utica greens	Utica greens	Northeast	Upstate New York	A dish made of hot peppers, sautéed greens, chicken stock or broth, escarole, cheese, Pecorino, breadcrumbs and variations of meat and prosciutto.
Wet burrito	Wet burrito	Midwest	Michigan	A burrito covered with a red chili sauce similar to a red enchilada sauce, with melted shredded cheese on top.

=== Barbecue ===
Image	Name	General Region	Associated regions	Description
A hickory-smoked chicken sandwich with white barbecue sauce	Alabama-style barbecue	South	Northern Alabama	Smoked chicken or other smoked meats, with a white barbecue sauce that has a base of mayonnaise instead of tomatoes. The sauce is said to have been developed in 1925 by Bob Gibson of Decatur.
A barbecue bologna sandwich	Barbecue bologna	Southwest	Oklahoma	Bologna that has been smoked barbecue-style, usually over pecan wood.
	Barbecue spaghetti	South	Memphis, Tennessee	Spaghetti noodles topped with a sauce made from smoked pork, vegetables, and barbecue sauce.
Carne asada burrito	Carne asada burrito	Southwest	San Diego, California	Said that to be to San Diegans, "...as integral to the experience of the place as a slice of (pizza) pie is to a New Yorker." The San Diego–style carne asada burrito is served with chunks of carne asada, guacamole, and pico de gallo salsa. This "wall-to-wall" use of meat contrasts to burrito styles that use rice and beans as filler ingredients.
Carne asada fries	Carne asada fries	Southwest	San Diego, California	French fries, carne asada, guacamole, sour cream, and cheese.
An aquarium smoker	Chicago-style barbecue	Midwest	Chicago	In addition to using more conventional methods of smoking meats, barbecue chefs in Chicago sometimes utilize an aquarium smoker, which is a rectangular indoor smoker with glass sides. Rib tips and hot links are popular in Chicago.
Chislic	Chislic	Midwest	South Dakota	Small cubes of mutton (or sometimes beef, pork, or venison), deep-fried or grilled and served on skewers or toothpicks.
	Chopped brisket sandwich	Southwest	Texas	A type of barbecue sandwich typically made with chopped up smoked beef brisket and barbecue sauce, and sometimes vegetables such as pickles, onions, and jalapeño peppers.
A red hot Garbage Plate	Garbage Plate	Northeast	Rochester, New York	A choice of two entrees such as cheeseburger, hamburger, red hots, white hots, Italian sausage, chicken tenders, fried haddock, fried ham, grilled cheese, or eggs; and two sides of either home fries, French fries, baked beans, or macaroni salad; topped with mustard, onions, and a meat sauce of slowly simmered ground beef and spices; usually served with Italian bread and butter on the side.
	Hoosier-style barbecue	Midwest	Indiana	Pork and beef slow-roasted over cherrywood, served with an apple cider and tomato based sauce.
"Combo plate" of several Kansas City-style barbecue dishes and French fries	Kansas City-style barbecue	Midwest	Kansas City, Missouri	Kansas City barbecue is slow-smoked over a variety of woods and then covered with a thick tomato- and molasses-based sauce. It is characterized by its use of a wide variety of meat. Burnt ends are quite popular in Kansas City.
Korean taco	Korean taco	Southwest	Los Angeles, California	Tacos with Korean-style fillings such as bulgogi and kimchi.
A barbecue cooker in Memphis	Memphis-style barbecue	South	Memphis, Tennessee	Typified by pork ribs, slow cooked in a pit. "Dry" ribs are covered with a dry rub before cooking, and are normally eaten without sauce. "Wet" ribs are brushed with sauce before, during, and after cooking.
Pulled pork	North Carolina-style barbecue	South	North Carolina	Pulled pork is very popular in North Carolina. In the eastern part of the state, a vinegar-based sauce is used. In the western part of the state, the sauce is tomato-based.
Pulled pork sandwich	Pulled pork sandwich	South	Southern United States	A sandwich filled shredded barbecued pork shoulder.
Roast pork Italian	Roast pork Italian	Northeast	Philadelphia, Pennsylvania	Italian-style roast pork shoulder (porchetta), broccoli rabe, and sharp provolone cheese on a hoagie roll
Santa Maria-style barbecue: Tri-tip with salsa, pink beans instead of pinquito beans, salad, and garlic bread.	Santa Maria-style barbecue	Southwest	Santa Maria Valley, California	Beef tri-tip and sometimes other meat, grilled over coals of the coast live oak, and traditionally served with salsa, pinquito beans, salad, and grilled French bread.
Pig pickin'	South Carolina-style Barbecue	South	South Carolina	Whole hog barbecue, or pig pickin', is popular in South Carolina. In the Midlands of South Carolina, mustard based barbecue sauce is common, while vinegar is more common in the upstate region. South Carolina is also known for "hash", a rich pork gravy made of offal and pork cuts.
St. Louis-style barbecue pork ribs	St. Louis-style barbecue	Midwest	St. Louis, Missouri	Various pork dishes cooked with barbecue sauce, which typically are grilled rather than being cooked in a smokehouse.
Texas-style barbecue smoke pit with various meats	Texas-style barbecue	Southwest	Texas	Texas-style barbecue often uses beef (especially brisket) instead of pork. There are several variations, including East, Central, West, and South Texas. The regions differ primarily in the type of wood used, the cooking method, and the addition and application of spices and sauce.

=== Breads and bread dishes ===
Image	Name	General Region	Associated regions	Description
Anadama bread	Anadama bread	Northeast	New England	A traditional yeast bread of New England made with wheat flour, cornmeal, molasses and sometimes rye flour
Beaten biscuits	Beaten biscuits	South	Southern United States	A dense biscuit, sometimes served with ham. Before baking the dough is beaten extensively with a rolling pin or other blunt instrument.
Bulkie roll	Bulkie roll	Northeast	New England	A sandwich roll common in New England. Similar to a kaiser roll but sweeter
Cornbread	Cornbread	South	Southern United States	A quick bread made with cornmeal.
Frybread	Frybread	West	Indigenous cuisine of the Americas	Flat, fried bread with a fluffy interior and crunchy exterior, made with wheat flour, sugar, salt, and lard or vegetable oil.
Hot water corn bread	Hot water corn bread	South	Southern United States	Cornbread made by mixing cornmeal and water and cooking the resulting batter in a skillet with cooking oil.
Johnnycakes	Johnnycakes	Multiple	East Coast, Southern United States, and Appalachia	Also known as hoecakes. Cornmeal flatbread, a dish of Native American origin.
New York–style bagel	New York–style bagel	Northeast	New York City	Bagels which are larger and fatter than other styles of bagels
Pan de campo	Pan de campo	Southwest	Texas	A a flatbread made from wheat flour, baking powder, salt, a fat, and water. Traditionally cooked in a dutch oven.
Parker House rolls, before baking	Parker House roll	Northeast	Boston, Massachusetts	A bread roll that was invented at the Parker House Hotel in Boston during the 1870s. It may be served as a side dish.
Piki	Piki	West	Western United States	A bread made from blue corn meal used in Hopi cuisine
	Pistolette	South	Louisiana	A pistolette is either of two bread-based dishes in Louisiana cuisine. One is a stuffed and fried bread roll (sometimes called stuffed pistolettes) in the Cajun areas around Lafayette. The other is a type of submarine shaped bread about half the size of a baguette that is popular in New Orleans for Vietnamese bánh mì and other sandwiches.
Texas toast	Texas toast	Southwest	Texas	A type of thick-cut white bread, grilled with butter or margarine and often with garlic and other spices, and usually used as a side dish

=== Chicken dishes ===
Image	Name	General Region	Associated regions	Description
Almond chicken	Almond chicken	Midwest	Midwestern United States	Chicken breaded in batter containing ground almonds, fried and served with almonds and onions.
Bourbon chicken	Bourbon chicken	South	New Orleans, Louisiana	Chicken Marinated in soy sauce, brown sugar, ginger, bourbon whiskey, and sometimes honey.
Broasted chicken, and broasted potatoes	Broasted chicken	Midwest	Wisconsin	Broasted chicken is pieces of chicken that have been battered and deep-fried in a pressure cooker. The outside is very crispy and the inside is moist and juicy. True broasted chicken is chicken that has been cooked using equipment and recipes supplied by the Broaster Company.
Buffalo wings, with celery sticks and ranch dressing	Buffalo wings	Northeast	Buffalo, New York	Chicken wing sections (wingettes and drumettes) that are deep-fried, unbreaded, and coated in a hot sauce made with cayenne pepper, vinegar, and butter. Usually served with celery or carrot sticks, and bleu cheese or ranch dressing for dipping.
Chicken and dumplings	Chicken and dumplings	Multiple	The South and the Midwest	Boiled chicken served with dumplings boiled in its broth
Chicken and waffles with peaches and cream	Chicken and waffles	Multiple	The South and the Northeast	The soul food version of chicken and waffles, popular in the South, pairs fried chicken with a breakfast waffle. The Pennsylvania Dutch version, found in the Northeast, consists of a plain waffle with pulled, stewed chicken on top, covered in gravy.
Chicken Divan	Chicken Divan	Northeast	New York City	A chicken casserole usually served with broccoli, almonds, and Mornay sauce. It was named after the place of its invention, the Divan Parisienne Restaurant in the New York City Chatham Hotel.
Chicken Francese	Chicken Francese	Northeast	New York (state)	An Italian-American dish of flour-dredged, egg-dipped, sautéed chicken cutlets with a lemon-butter and sherry or white wine sauce.
Chicken Maryland and pilaf	Chicken Maryland	South	Maryland	Fried chicken served with a cream gravy
	Chicken mull	South	North Carolina, South Carolina and Georgia	A traditional stew consisting of parboiled whole chicken in a cream or milk based broth, butter and seasoned with salt, pepper and other ingredients
Chicken parmesan	Chicken parmesan	Northeast	New York City	A breaded chicken breast covered in tomato sauce and mozzarella, parmesan and/or provolone.
Chicken riggies	Chicken riggies	Northeast	Utica–Rome area, New York	An Italian-American pasta dish of chicken, rigatoni, and hot or sweet peppers, in a spicy cream and tomato sauce.
Chicken Vesuvio	Chicken Vesuvio	Midwest	Chicago	Pieces of chicken on the bone, with potato wedges and peas, cooked with white wine, garlic, and olive oil. An Italian American dish.
Country Captain	Country Captain	South	Low Country of South Carolina and Georgia	Curried chicken over rice with onions, usually also with golden raisins and almonds.
Fried chicken	Fried chicken	South	Southern United States	A dish consisting of chicken pieces that have been coated with seasoned flour or batter and pan-fried, deep-fried, pressure-fried, or air-fried. The breading adds a crisp coating or crust to the exterior of the chicken while retaining juices in the meat. Broiler chickens are most commonly used.
General Tso's chicken	General Tso's chicken	Northeast	New York City	A sweet and spicy Chinese-American deep-fried chicken dish in a sauce made of soy sauce, vinegar, and sugar, flavored with garlic and ginger.
	Hawaiian haystack	West	Idaho and Utah	A sauce with chunks of chicken, poured over steamed rice, and garnished with crispy chow mein noodles and pineapple. Various optional condiments, such as coconut, diced bell peppers and tomatoes, and grated cheese are also often included.
Hot chicken, with a side of potato salad	Hot chicken	South	Nashville, Tennessee	A portion of breast, thigh, or wing that has been marinated in buttermilk, floured, fried, and finally sauced using an oil-based paste that has been spiced with cayenne pepper.
King Ranch chicken	King Ranch chicken	Southwest	Texas	A Tex-Mex casserole made with shredded chicken, canned soup, canned tomatoes with chiles, cheese, and tortillas.
Lemon pepper wings	Lemon pepper wings	South	Atlanta	Fried chicken wings that have been heavily coated in lemon pepper seasoning. Lemon pepper wings can also be served "wet", i.e. with buffalo sauce.
Moravian chicken pie	Moravian chicken pie	South	Winston-Salem, North Carolina	A savory pie containing no vegetables and filled only with chicken meat and a small amount of thickened broth. Served with hot chicken gravy on top.
	Springfield-style cashew chicken	Midwest	Springfield, Missouri	Deep-fried pieces of chicken served over rice. Topped with a sauce made of chicken broth, soy sauce, and oyster sauce, thickened with corn starch. Garnished with unsalted cashews and sliced green onions.

=== Desserts and confectionery ===
Image	Name	General Region	Associated regions	Description
Ambrosia	Ambrosia	South	Southern United States	A fruit salad consisting of fresh pineapple, canned mandarin orange slices or fresh orange sections, miniature marshmallows, and coconut.
Baked Alaska	Baked Alaska	Northeast	New York City	A dish is made of ice cream placed in a pie dish, lined with slices of sponge cake or Christmas pudding, and topped with meringue. After having been placed in the freezer, the entire dessert is then placed in an extremely hot oven for a brief time, long enough to firm and caramelize the meringue but not long enough to begin melting the ice cream.
Banana pudding	Banana pudding	South	Southern United States	a Southern dessert generally consisting of layers of sweet vanilla-flavored custard, vanilla wafers or ladyfingers, and sliced fresh bananas which are assembled in a dish and served topped with whipped cream or meringue.
Bananas Foster	Bananas Foster	South	New Orleans	A dessert made from bananas and vanilla ice cream, with a sauce made from butter, brown sugar, cinnamon, dark rum, and banana liqueur. The butter, sugar and bananas are cooked, then the alcohol is added and ignited as a flambé. The bananas and sauce are served over the ice cream.
Bean pie	Bean pie	South	Southern United States	A sweet custard pie with a filling of mashed navy beans, sugar, butter, milk, and spices, including vanilla, cinnamon, and nutmeg.
Bear claw	Bear claw	West	Western United States	A sweet, yeast-raised Danish pastry with a shape that is made to look like a bear's paw.
Beignets with powdered sugar	Beignet	South	New Orleans	A beignet (/bɛnˈjeɪ/ ben-YAY) is a square-shaped pastry made with deep-fried choux dough and topped with powdered sugar.
Bizcochito	Bizcochito	Southwest	New Mexico	A New Mexican crisp butter cookie made with lard, flavored with sugar, cinnamon, and anise.
Black and white cookie	Black and white cookie	Northeast	New York City	A round cookie with half chocolate half vanilla icing.
Blackout cake	Blackout cake	Northeast	New York City	A chocolate cake filled with chocolate pudding and topped with chocolate cake crumbs.
Blueberry pie	Blueberry pie	Northeast	New England	A pie with a blueberry filling.
Boston cream donut	Boston cream donut	Northeast	Massachusetts	A yeast-risen donut with chocolate frosting and a creamy vanilla-flavored custard filling: a miniature version of the Boston cream pie. It was designated the official donut of Massachusetts in 2003 after the Boston cream pie itself was chosen as the state dessert in 1996.
Boston cream pie	Boston cream pie	Northeast	Boston	A cake that is filled with a custard or cream filling and frosted with chocolate
	Bumpy cake	Midwest	Michigan	A Devil's food cake that is topped with buttercream frosting and covered with chocolate ganache
Buttermilk pie	Buttermilk pie	South	Southern United States	A traditional custard-like pie in a pastry crust with a filling made of a mixture of sugar, butter, eggs, buttermilk and flour.
Chantilly cake	Chantilly cake	West	Hawaii	A delicacy in Hawaii, dating back to the 1950s. Usually, Chantilly cakes are chocolate cakes with a Chantilly frosting, which is essentially the coconut frosting from a German chocolate cake without the coconut. This is in contrast to the typical usage of creme Chantilly, which refers to sweetened whipped cream.
Chess pie	Chess pie	South	Southern United States	A simple, sweet custard-like pie that is made from eggs, butter, sugar, and optionally a flavoring such as lemon, orange, or chocolate.
Chiffon pie	Chiffon pie	Southwest	Los Angeles	A type of pie that consists of a special type of airy filling in a crust. The filling is typically produced by folding meringue into a mixture resembling fruit curd (most commonly lemon) that has been thickened with unflavored gelatin to provide a light, airy texture; it is thus distinguished from a cream pie or mousse pie, which achieve lightness by folding in whipped cream rather than meringue. This filling is then put into a pre-baked pie shell of variable composition and chilled.
Coconut cake	Coconut cake	South	Southern United States	A cake frosted with a white frosting and covered in coconut flakes.
Cookie salad	Cookie salad	Midwest	Minnesota	A dessert salad made with buttermilk, vanilla pudding, whipped cream, mandarin oranges, crushed pineapple, and fudge stripe shortbread cookies.
	Cronut	Northeast	New York City	A croissant crossed with a donut.
Derby pie	Derby pie	South	Kentucky	Derby pie is a chocolate and walnut tart in a pie shell with a pastry dough crust. It is made with walnuts and chocolate chips. The pie was created in the Melrose Inn of Prospect, Kentucky, United States, by George Kern with the help of his parents, Walter and Leaudra. It is often associated with the Kentucky Derby. As the name is trademarked, the makers of similar pies have had to use a different name such as "Pegasus pie", a reference to the Pegasus Parade at the Kentucky Derby Festival, and May Day pie, in reference to the First Saturday in May, the day of the Kentucky Derby.
Doberge cake	Doberge cake	South	New Orleans	Doberge (/doʊˈbɜːrʒ/ doh-BURZH) cake is a cake with many thin layers, separated with dessert pudding (often half chocolate and half lemon), and with a glazed outer frosting.
Dutch baby pancake	Dutch baby pancake	West	Washington (state)	A thick pancake that uses no chemical leavening agents and is baked in the oven instead of fried.
Fortune cookies	Fortune cookie	West	San Francisco	A crisp, sugary cookie wafer usually made from flour, sugar, vanilla and sesame seed oil, containing a piece of paper inside bearing a "fortune", usually an aphorism or a vague prophecy, and typically served after a Chinese meal. Makoto Hagiwara of the Tea House in the Japanese Tea Garden in San Francisco's Golden Gate Park reportedly first served the modern version of the cookie in the 1890s or early 1900s.
Frozen banana	Frozen banana	Southwest	Newport Beach, California	Made by putting a banana on a stick, freezing it, and dipping it in melted chocolate. May be covered with toppings such as chopped nuts, sprinkles, sugar, and crushed cookies.
Funnel cake	Funnel cake	Northeast	Pennsylvania	Deep fried batter.
Glorified rice	Glorified rice	Midwest	Upper Midwest	A dessert salad made from rice, crushed pineapple and whipped cream. It is often decorated with maraschino cherries.
Gooey butter cake	Gooey butter cake	Midwest	St. Louis, Missouri	A flat, dense cake made with yellow box cake mix, butter, sugar, and eggs, and cream cheese typically about 1 inch (2.5 cm) tall, and can be dusted with powdered sugar.
Grape hull pie	Grape hull pie	South	Southern United States	A pie traditionally made with muscadine grapes and their skins.
Grape pie	Grape pie	Northeast	Finger Lakes region, Upstate New York	A fruit pie made from concord grapes.
Happy Cake	Happy Cake	West	Hawaii	A tropical cake prepared with pineapple, coconut and macadamia nuts, it is often referred to as Hawaii's version of a fruit cake.
A slab of haupia	Haupia	West	Hawaii	Haupia (/haʊˈpiːə/ how-PEE-ə) is a dish in the native cuisine of Hawaii, it is a coconut milk-based Hawaiian dessert often found at luaus and other local gatherings in Hawaiʻi
Honey bun	Honey buns	South	North Carolina	A fried yeast pastry that contains honey and a swirl of cinnamon in the dough and is glazed with icing.
	Hot milk cake	Multiple	Mid-Atlantic states	Has a distinctive flavor from scalded milk that is the liquid component of the batter. It differs from traditional sponge cakes because it does contain baking powder as leavening, and the eggs are beaten together whole instead of whipping the yolks and whites separately.
Hummingbird cake	Hummingbird cake	South	Southern United States	A banana-pineapple spice cake that has been a tradition in Southern cuisine since the mid-20th century. The first known publication of the recipe, as written by L.H. Wiggin, was in the February 1978 issue of Southern Living.
Italian ice	Italian ice	Northeast	New York City, Philadelphia	Also known as 'water ice' in the Philadelphia area, it's a semi-frozen sweetened treat composed of finely granulated ice and fruit concentrates, juices, or purées, or other natural or artificial food flavorings. Derived from Italian granita.
Jello salad	Jello salad	Northeast	Pennsylvania	A salad consisting of flavored gelatin, fruit, and sometimes grated carrots or other vegetables.
	Kentucky jam cake	South	Kentucky and Tennessee	Prepared with jam and spices mixed in the batter and is decorated with caramel icing.
Key lime pie	Key lime pie	South	Key West, Florida	A pie made with key lime juice, egg yolks, and sweetened condensed milk, with a meringue topping.
King cake	King cake	South	New Orleans	A cake made of braided pastry laced with cinnamon, with purple, green, and gold frosting, and a small plastic baby hidden inside. Eaten during Mardi Gras season.
A package of kulolo	Kulolo	West	Hawaii	A dessert made from mashed kalo (taro) corms, grated coconut meat or coconut milk, and sugar
Lady Baltimore cake	Lady Baltimore cake	South	Southern United States	A white layer cake with fluffy frosting and a fruit and nut filling.
Lane cake	Lane cake	South	Georgia, Alabama, Mississippi	Also known as a prize cake; a bourbon-soaked layer cake
Lemon ice box pie	Lemon ice box pie	South	Southern United States	Lemon juice, eggs, and condensed milk in a pie crust, with preparation very similar to that of key lime pie.
	Lemon stick	South	Baltimore, Maryland	Half of a lemon with a peppermint stick in it
Mississippi mud pie	Mississippi mud pie	South	Mississippi	A chocolate-based dessert pie.
Modjeskas, individually wrapped in parchment paper	Modjeska	South	Louisville, Kentucky	A marshmallow dipped in caramel.
Moravian sugar cake	Moravian sugar cake	South	Bethlehem, Pennsylvania; Winston-Salem, North Carolina	A traditional sweet coffee cake topped with butter, brown sugar and cinnamon which was popularized by Moravians in Pennsylvania and North Carolina.
	Needham	Northeast	Maine	A confectionery dessert bar made from sugar, chocolate, coconut, and potato.
New York roll	New York roll	Northeast	New York City	A roll made from circular croissant dough, and filled with pastry cream and topped with a chocolate ganache.
New York-style cheesecake	New York-style cheesecake	Northeast	New York City	Rich cheesecake made with a cream cheese base.
Pastry heart	Pastry heart	Northeast	Buffalo, New York	A heart-shaped flaky puff pastry, similar to a palmier, that is usually topped with a white sugar icing that has a hard shell but is soft on the inside.
Peanut pie	Peanut pie	South	Tidewater region	A pie prepared with peanuts or peanut butter as a primary ingredient.
Pecan pie	Pecan pie	Multiple	Southern United States, Texas	A pie made primarily of eggs and corn syrup with pecan nuts.
Red velvet cake	Red velvet cake	South	Southern United States	Red colored cake made with cocoa powder. Red food and drinks are traditional during Juneteenth celebrations, including red velvet cake. The color red represents resilience and joy.
Salt water taffy	Salt water taffy	Northeast	Atlantic City, New Jersey	Originally produced and marketed in the Atlantic City, New Jersey area starting in the 1880s
Shaker lemon pie	Shaker lemon pie	Midwest	Ohio and elsewhere in the Midwest	A pie with a filling made with whole lemons that have been sliced extremely thin and macerated with sugar.
Shoofly pie	Shoofly pie	Northeast	Pennsylvania	A pie with a cake-like consistency, made with molasses.
Smith Island cake	Smith Island cake	South	Smith Island, Maryland	8 to 15+ very thin layers of yellow cake separated by thick, fudge-like chocolate frosting.
Snickerdoodle	Snickerdoodle	Northeast	New England	A type of cookie made with flour, fat, sugar, and salt, and rolled in cinnamon sugar.
Snickers salad	Snickers salad	Midwest	Iowa	A mix of Snickers bars, Granny Smith apples, whipped cream, and often pudding or whipped topping, served in a bowl.
Stack cake	Stack cake	Multiple	Appalachia	A stack of cakes layered with fillings of molasses and apples.
Strawberry delight	Strawberry delight	Midwest	Minnesota	A dessert salad made from milk, whipped topping, cream cheese, strawberries and strawberry gelatin over a graham cracker crust.
Strawberry rhubarb pie	Strawberry rhubarb pie	Northeast	New England, Upstate New York	A sweet and tart pie made with strawberries and rhubarb, with a latticed top crust.
Sugar cream pie	Sugar cream pie	Midwest	Indiana	Often referred to as Hoosier sugar cream pie, this is the state food of Indiana. It is a single crust pie made from brown sugar, flour, butter, salt, vanilla, and cream. The Hoosier sugar cream pie is recognizable for being a shallow pie with a nutmeg dusting on top.
Sugar on snow being made	Sugar on snow	Northeast	Vermont; Upstate New York; Quebec	Also known as "tire sur la neige" (French for "pull over snow"). A candy made by boiling maple syrup and pouring it over clean snow to harden it. Popular at seasonal "sugaring-off" events where freshly tapped maple syrup is boiled and guests receive a small spoon or popsicle stick to roll the still-warm maple onto.
Sweet potato pie	Sweet potato pie	South	Southern United States	A pie with a filling of mashed sweet potatoes, milk, sugar and eggs, flavored with spices such as nutmeg.
	Tarte à la Bouillie	South	Louisiana	Tarte à la Bouillie (/ˌtɑːrt ə lə buˈiː/ TART-ə-lə-boo-EE) are sweet-dough custard tarts that are part of Cajun cuisine.
Toll House cookies	Toll House cookie	Northeast	Massachusetts	A cookie made with butter, brown sugar, and white sugar, with semi-sweet chocolate chips. Invented at the Toll House Inn in Whitman, Massachusetts.
A tipsy cake shaped like a hedgehog	Tipsy cake	South	Southern United States	A variation on the English trifle brought to America in colonial times. A cake made with an alcoholic beverage such as wine, sherry, or bourbon, and often with custard, jam, or fruit.
Watergate salad	Watergate salad	Midwest	Midwestern United States	A dessert salad made from pistachio pudding, canned pineapple, whipped topping, crushed walnuts or pecans, and marshmallows.
Whoopie pie	Whoopie pie	Northeast	Maine and Pennsylvania	A baked product made of two round mound-shaped pieces of chocolate cake with a sweet, creamy filling or frosting sandwiched between them. Referred to in some parts of Pennsylvania as a gob.

=== Fish and seafood dishes ===
Image	Name	General Region	Associated regions	Description
California roll	California roll	West	Western United States	A type of sushi that contains imitation crab (or rarely real crab), avocado, and cucumber.
Cioppino	Cioppino	West	San Francisco, California	Cioppino (/tʃoʊˈpiːnoʊ/ choh-PEE-noh) is an Italian-American fish stew with tomatoes and a variety of fish and shellfish.
Clambake	Clambake	Northeast	New England	Seafood and vegetables steamed between layers of seaweed over hot rocks on a beach.
Clam cake	Clam cakes	Northeast	Rhode Island	Fritter made from flour, water, baking powder, clam juice, and chopped or minced clams (usually quahogs) all mixed together, rolled into balls and deep fried.
Clam pie	Clam pie	Northeast	New England	A savory meat pie prepared using clams, especially quahogs, as a primary ingredient.
Clams casino	Clams casino	Northeast	Rhode Island	A clam served on a half clamshell, topped with breadcrumbs and crumbled bacon, and broiled.
Crab cakes	Crab cakes	South	Maryland	Crab meat and other ingredients (such as bread crumbs, milk, mayonnaise, eggs, and seasonings, particularly Old Bay Seasoning), traditionally deep-fried or sautéd, and increasingly often broiled.
Crab Rangoon	Crab Rangoon	Southwest	Beverly Hills, California	Filled crisp dumpling appetizers served primarily in American Chinese restaurants. The filling is made with a combination of cream cheese, crab meat or imitation crab meat, scallions or onion, garlic, and other flavorings.
Crawfish pie	Crawfish pie	South	Louisiana	A savory pie similar to a pot pie filled with crawfish.
Deviled crab	Deviled crab	South	Tampa, Florida	A crab meat croquette. Deviled crab croquettes originated in Tampa, Florida, where they were developed in the Spanish, Cuban and Italian immigrant community of Ybor City.
Crawfish étouffée	Étouffée	South	Louisiana, Mississippi	Étouffée (/eɪtuːˈfeɪ/ ay-too-FAY) is crawfish (or sometimes other shellfish such as shrimp or crabs) cooked using a technique called smothering, with roux, Cajun spices, and other ingredients, and served with rice.
Fish boil platter	Fish boil	Midwest	Door County, Wisconsin	Freshwater whitefish, potatoes, and onions are boiled in a large pot of salty water, with the fish and potatoes in wire baskets. When the fish is ready, the fish oil, which has floated to the top, is removed, traditionally with burning kerosene.
Fried clams	Fried clams	Northeast	New England	Clams that have been dipped in milk, floured, and deep-fried. They are "to New England, what barbecue is to the South". They tend to be served at seaside clam shacks (roadside restaurants).
Frogmore stew	Frogmore stew	South	Low Country of South Carolina and Georgia	Frogmore stew, also known as low country boil, is a dish consisting of shell-on shrimp, smoked sausage, corn, and red potatoes all cooked together in a spice laden broth. It's typically served family style, on newspaper with lemon, cocktail sauce, and drawn butter.
Hangtown fry	Hangtown fry	West	San Francisco, California	Hangtown fry is a type of omelette made famous during the California Gold Rush in the 1850s. The most common version includes bacon and oysters combined with eggs, and fried together.
Lobster Fra Diavolo	Lobster Fra Diavolo	Northeast	New York City	A pasta dish made with lobster, sometimes other seafood, that contains crushed red pepper to make it spicy
Lobster Newberg	Lobster Newberg	Northeast	New York City	An American seafood dish made from lobster, butter, cream, cognac, sherry, eggs, and cayenne pepper.
Lobster roll, with potato chips and a pickle	Lobster roll	Northeast	New England	A sandwich of lobster meat served in a top-loading hot dog bun.
Lox and schmear bagel	Lox and schmear bagel	Northeast	New York City	Lox and cream cheese (schmear) on a New York-style bagel. Often garnished with tomato, onion, cucumber, and/or capers.
Oysters Bienville	Oysters Bienville	South	New Orleans, Louisiana	A traditional dish in New Orleans cuisine, it consists of filled, baked oysters. Ingredients include shrimp, mushrooms, bell peppers, sherry, a roux with butter, Parmesan cheese and other lighter cheese, as well as bread crumbs.
	Oysters en brochette	South	New Orleans	A classic dish in New Orleans Creole cuisine, raw oysters are skewered, alternating with pieces of partially cooked bacon. The entire dish is then broiled or breaded (usually with corn flour) then either deep fried or sautéed
Oysters Rockefeller	Oysters Rockefeller	South	New Orleans	Oysters on the half-shell that have been topped with various other ingredients (often parsley and other green herbs, a rich butter sauce and bread crumbs) and are then baked or broiled
Popcorn shrimp	Popcorn shrimp	South	Louisiana	Deep fried shrimp, eaten as a finger food like popcorn.
Rolled oyster	Rolled oyster	South	Louisville, Kentucky	A baseball-sized seafood dish that is found only in and around Louisville, Kentucky. It consists of three raw oysters dipped in an egg-milk cornmeal batter called pastinga, rolled in cracker crumbs (hence the name), and deep fried.
Seattle roll	Seattle roll	West	Seattle, Washington	A sushi roll with salmon and cream cheese.
Shrimp and grits	Shrimp and grits	South	The South Carolina Lowcountry and other coastal areas of the Southeast	Grits with cooked shrimp added, usually served for breakfast.
Shrimp Creole	Shrimp Creole	South	Louisiana	Cooked shrimp in a mixture of tomatoes, onions, celery, and bell peppers, spiced with hot pepper sauce or cayenne-based seasoning, and served over steamed or boiled white rice.
Shrimp DeJonghe	Shrimp DeJonghe	Midwest	Chicago	A casserole of large, peeled shrimp, soft breadcrumbs, and a rich sauce made with butter, garlic, and white wine or sherry.
Clockwise from bottom: squid luau, pipikaula shortribs, kalua pig, tripe stew, rice, opihi poke, laulau, and poi in the center	Squid lū'au	West	Hawaii	Made with squid (or octopus), taro (lu'au) leaves, coconut milk, garlic, water, and Hawaiian salt. (Squid lū'au is pictured at the very bottom of the image.)
Steamed clams	Steamed clams	Northeast	New England	A seafood dish consisting of clams cooked by steaming. Usually made with small soft-shell clams (Mya arenaria) called 'steamers'.
Stuffies	Stuffies	Northeast	Rhode Island and elsewhere in New England	Also known as stuffed clams or stuffed quahogs. Quahog clams, minced and mixed with breadcrumbs and sometimes other ingredients, baked on the half-shell.
Tuna tartare	Tuna tartare	Southwest	Los Angeles	A minced raw tuna dish.

=== Hot dogs and sausages ===
Image	Name	General Region	Associated regions	Description
Bagel dogs	Bagel dog	Multiple	New York City, Chicago, Cincinnati	A full-size or miniature hot dog, wrapped in bagel-style breading before or after cooking.
Beer brats	Beer brat	Midwest	Wisconsin	A bratwurst simmered in beer and then grilled.
Boudin	Boudin	South	Southern Louisiana	A sausage made with pork, rice, and Cajun spices.
Carolina-style hot dog	Carolina-style hot dog	South	North and South Carolina	A hot dog topped with chili, slaw, and onions; locally, mustard sometimes replaces slaw, or is added as a fourth item.
Chicago-style hot dog	Chicago-style hot dog	Midwest	Chicago	An all-beef hot dog on a poppy seed bun, topped with chopped onions, pickle spear, tomato slices, neon-green relish, celery salt, and sport peppers. Also topped with mustard, but not ketchup.
Cheese coney	Coney	Midwest	Cincinnati	A hot dog topped with a spiced meat sauce called Cincinnati chili, mustard, diced onions, and sometimes cheese.
Coney Island hot dog	Coney Island hot dog	Midwest	Detroit, Flint, elsewhere in Michigan, Fort Wayne, Indiana	A large, natural-casing hot dog topped with a hearty, mildly spiced meat sauce, and with mustard and diced onions.
Dodger dog	Dodger Dog	Southwest	Los Angeles, California	A 10-inch (25 cm) hot dog wrapped in a steamed bun. Sold at the baseball park of the Los Angeles Dodgers.
Half-smoke	Half-smoke	South	Washington, D.C.	A "local sausage delicacy" that is similar to a hot dog, but usually larger, spicier, and with more coarsely-ground meat. The sausage is often half-pork and half-beef, smoked, and served with herbs, onions, and chili sauce.
	Italian hot dog	Northeast	Newark, New Jersey	A deep-fried hot dog on pizza bread, topped with onions, peppers, and fried potatoes.
Japanese-style hot dog	Japanese-style hot dog	West	Pacific Northwest	A popular fusion street food featuring grilled, high-quality sausages (often pork or Wagyu beef) in soft buns, topped with unique ingredients like teriyaki sauce, Kewpie mayo, bonito flakes, nori, and sautéed onions.
Jersey breakfast dog	Jersey breakfast dog	Northeast	New Jersey	A hot dog wrapped in bacon and deep fried, with melted cheese, on top of a fried or scrambled egg.
Klobasnek	Klobásník	Southwest	Texas	A klobasnek (meaning "sausage roll") is an American Czech savory finger food. Unlike kolaches, which are sweet and which came to the United States with Czech immigrants, klobasneks were first made by Czechs who settled in Texas.
Maxwell Street Polish sausages, pork chops, and onions on a grill	Maxwell Street Polish	Midwest	Chicago	A Polish sausage made with beef and pork, and with garlic and other spices. Served on a bun with grilled onions.
Michigan hot dog	Michigan hot dog	Northeast	North Country of New York state	A natural-casing hot dog made of beef and pork, sometimes bright red in color, on a steamed bun, topped with a meat sauce made with hamburger meat, tomatoes, and spices. Optionally also topped with onions and yellow mustard.
Three "all the way"	New York System wiener	Northeast	Rhode Island	A sausage similar to a hot dog, made of veal and pork, served in a steamed bun, and topped with celery salt, yellow mustard, chopped onions, and a seasoned meat sauce made from ground beef.
Pepperoni roll	Pepperoni roll	Multiple	West Virginia and Appalachia	Pepperoni baked inside a soft roll to create an easily portable snack or lunch item.
Polish Boy	Polish Boy	Midwest	Cleveland	A kielbasa sausage covered with French fries, barbecue sauce, and cole slaw, served in a long bun.
Rippers with onion rings	Ripper	Northeast	Northern New Jersey	A hot dog that is deep-fried until the casing rips.
Sausage and peppers	Sausage and peppers	Northeast	New York City	Italian sausages with bell peppers, often with onions and tomato sauce. Sometimes served with pasta or on a hero roll.
Seattle-style hot dog	Seattle-style hot dog	West	Seattle	A hot dog or Polish sausage, usually grilled, topped with cream cheese. Often also topped with condiments such as mustard, grilled onions, or sauerkraut.
Sonoran hot dog	Sonoran hot dog	Southwest	Tucson and elsewhere in southern Arizona	A hot dog wrapped in bacon and grilled, served on a bolillo-style hot dog bun, and topped with pinto beans, onions, tomatoes, and a variety of additional condiments, often including mayonnaise, mustard, and jalapeño salsa.
	Texas Tommy	Northeast	Philadelphia and elsewhere in eastern Pennsylvania	Invented in Pottstown, Pennsylvania, a Texas Tommy is a hot dog that is split and filled with cheese, wrapped with bacon, and then cooked.
A white hot topped with hot sauce, mustard, and onions	White hot	Northeast	Rochester, New York	A hot dog made with a combination of uncured and unsmoked pork, beef, and veal. The lack of smoking or curing allows the meat to retain a naturally white color. White hots usually contain mustard and other spices, and often include a dairy component such as nonfat dry milk.

=== Pizza ===
Image	Name	General Region	Associated regions	Description
Brier Hill-style pizza	Brier Hill-style pizza	Midwest	Youngstown, Ohio	Pizza with breadlike dough, thick tomato sauce, bell peppers and Romano cheese rather than the more-typical mozzarella.
California-style pizza	California-style pizza	West	California	Thin-crust pizza with fresh, nontraditional toppings such as chicken, peanut sauce, artichoke hearts, and goat cheese.
Chicago-style pizza	Chicago-style pizza	Midwest	Chicago	Deep-dish pizza, with a tall outer crust and large amounts of cheese, with chunky tomato sauce on top of the cheese instead of underneath it.
Detroit-style pizza	Detroit-style pizza	Midwest	Detroit	A square pizza similar to Sicilian-style pizza that has a thick deep-dish crisp crust, brick cheese, and toppings such as pepperoni and olives, and is served with the marinara sauce on top.
Grandma pizza	Grandma pizza	Northeast	Long Island	Thin-crust pizza topped sparingly with shredded mozzarella, crushed uncooked canned tomatoes, chopped garlic, and olive oil, cooked in a rectangular pan and then cut into squares.
Mon Valley red top	Mon Valley Red Top	Northeast	Monongahela River Valley: Charleroi, Pennsylvania, Donora, Pennsylvania, Monessen, Pennsylvania	Double-decker pizza with mozzarella cheese sandwiched between two dough layers with its red sauce on top.
New Haven-style pizza	New Haven-style pizza	Northeast	New Haven, Connecticut	A Neapolitan-influenced pizza with a thin, crisp crust. A "plain" pizza is crust, oregano, and tomato sauce with a little bit of grated pecorino romano cheese sprinkled on. Mozzarella is considered to be a topping; a customer who wants it must ask for it.
New York-style pizza	New York-style pizza	Northeast	New York City	Pizza with a thin, hand-tossed crust that is soft and foldable but crispy on the edge. Often sold in wide, wedge-shaped slices to go.
Ohio Valley-style pizza	Ohio Valley-style pizza	Multiple	Steubenville, Ohio; Pittsburgh; Western Pennsylvania	Pizza with a square crust, tomato sauce, small amounts of cheese, and cold toppings added after baking
Pizza bagel	Pizza bagel	Midwest	Cleveland, Ohio	The two halves of a toasted bagel, baked with tomato sauce, mozzarella cheese, and often other pizza toppings.
Pizza puff	Pizza puff	Midwest	Chicago	A deep-fried dough pocket filled with cheese, tomato sauce, and other pizza ingredients such as sausage. Can be found at some hot dog stands and casual dining restaurants.
Quad City-style pizza	Quad City-style pizza	Midwest	The Quad Cities area of Iowa and Illinois	The crust has a nutty taste, the tomato sauce is spicy, the toppings are under the cheese, and the pizza is cut into strips.
St. Louis-style pizza	St. Louis-style pizza	Midwest	St. Louis	Pizza, often made with Provel cheese, with a very thin crust made without yeast. Generally cut into squares or rectangles instead of wedges.
Taco pizza	Taco pizza	Midwest	Iowa	A pizza that uses taco ingredients
Tomato pie	Tomato pie	Northeast	Trenton, New Jersey	Thick-crust pizza dish cooked with cheese underneath a large amount of garlicky tomato sauce, cooled to room temperature before serving.

=== Potato dishes ===
Image	Name	General Region	Associated regions	Description
Disco fries	Disco fries	Northeast	New Jersey	A dish of french fries topped with brown gravy and melted shredded cheese (typically mozzarella).
Funeral potatoes	Funeral potatoes	West	Idaho and Utah	A casserole of hash browns or grated/cubed potatoes, Cheddar or Parmesan cheese, cream soup or a cream sauce, and other ingredients, topped with corn flakes or crushed potato chips.
Jo-Jo potatoes	Jo Jo potatoes	Multiple	Ohio, Pacific Northwest	Potato wedges that are fried in the same vat as chicken, or that are coated in a seasoned flour and fried.
Potatoes O'Brien	Potatoes O'Brien	Northeast	Boston, Massachusetts and Manhattan, New York	Pan-fried potatoes along with green and red bell peppers. Its origin is disputed; it has been claimed that it originated in the early 20th century from a Boston restaurant named Jerome's and, during the same time period, from a Manhattan restaurant named Jack's.
Salt potatoes being cooked in a pot	Salt potatoes	Northeast	Syracuse, New York	As the potatoes cook, the salty water forms a crust on the skin and seals the potatoes so they never taste waterlogged

=== Rice dishes ===
Image	Name	General Region	Associated regions	Description
Charleston red rice	Charleston red rice	South	The lowcountry of South Carolina and Georgia	Long grain rice cooked with crushed tomatoes, small bits of bacon or smoked pork sausage, celery, bell peppers, and onions.
Dirty rice	Dirty rice	South	Louisiana	Rice cooked with small amounts of meat (traditionally chicken giblets) which give it a dark color, along with onions, bell peppers, celery, and spices.
Halal over rice	Halal over rice	Northeast	New York City	Halal-slaughtered lamb or chicken over yellow rice, typically with white sauce and vegetables.
Hoppin' John	Hoppin' John	South	The Carolina Lowcountry	Rice cooked with black-eyed peas or field peas, chopped onion, and sliced bacon. Sometimes country sausage, ham hock, fatback, or another type of meat is used instead of bacon.
Jambalaya	Jambalaya	South	Louisiana	A dish of rice and meat in Louisiana Creole cuisine (often a combination of andouille sausage, chicken, and shrimp) cooked with vegetables and Louisiana Creole spices.
Red beans and rice	Red beans and rice	South	Louisiana	A dish in Louisiana Creole cuisine, it is prepared with kidney beans cooked with Louisiana Cajun spices, and often also cooked with ham and vegetables such as bell peppers, onions, and celery, served together with white rice.
Smothered turkey rice and gravy	Rice and gravy	South	Louisiana	Traditionally a brown gravy based on pan drippings, cooked with onions, bell peppers, celery, and seasonings, and served over steamed or boiled rice. Now often made with various types of meats.
Seattle-style teriyaki	Seattle-style teriyaki	West	Seattle, Washington	A comfort food originating in Seattle, it is characterized by fresh meat marinated in a sweet soy-ginger blend, grilled over an open flame, and finished with a drizzle of teriyaki sauce. Served with coleslaw-like salad and rice.
Spam musubi	Spam musubi	West	Hawaii	A piece of grilled Spam on top of a rice ball, held together with a strip of nori. This is similar to nigiri sushi, but with Spam instead of raw fish.

=== Salads ===
Image	Name	General Region	Associated regions	Description
Celery Victor	Celery Victor	West	San Francisco	Celery hearts simmered in a veal, chicken, or beef stock, chilled (often in a citrus or vinegar marinade), tossed with mild peppers, and sometimes served over lettuce.
Chinese chicken salad	Chinese chicken salad	Southwest	Santa Monica, California	A salad with chicken, Chinese noodles, lettuce, ginger, and sesame oil.
Cobb salad	Cobb salad	Southwest	Los Angeles, California	A garden salad made from chopped salad greens (iceberg lettuce, watercress, endives and Romaine lettuce), tomato, crisp bacon, boiled, grilled or roasted (but not fried) chicken breast, hard-boiled egg, avocado, chives, Roquefort cheese, and red-wine vinaigrette. Various stories exist recounting how the salad was invented.
Crab Louie	Crab Louie	West	San Francisco/Spokane	Iceberg lettuce with Dungeness crab or other crab meat, hard boiled eggs, tomatoes, and Louis dressing.
Frogeye salad	Frogeye salad	West	Idaho and Utah	A pasta salad that is made with acini di pepe pasta, whipped topping and egg yolks. Fruit, such as mandarin oranges and pineapples, are often mixed in, and it is sometimes topped with marshmallows.
Lomi-lomi salmon	Lomi-lomi salmon	West	Hawaii	A fresh, cold Hawaiian side dish (or salad) served at luau celebrations, typically made by massaging salted, diced salmon with raw tomatoes, sweet onions, and sometimes green onions.
Michigan salad with grilled shrimp	Michigan salad	Midwest	Michigan	A green salad topped with dried cherries or cranberries, blue cheese, vinaigrette, and sometimes apple slices.
Pittsburgh salad	Pittsburgh salad	Northeast	Pittsburgh, Pennsylvania	A layered salad, often composed of lettuce, vegetables, grilled meat, shredded cheese, ranch dressing, and most notably, french fries.
Tako (octopus) poke	Poke	West	Hawaii	Poke (/ˈpoʊkeɪ/ POH-kay) is a raw seafood salad served as an appetizer in Hawaiian cuisine. It is most commonly made with yellowfin tuna, salty seaweed, and sweet onions.
Seven-layer salad	Seven-layer salad	South	Southern United States	A salad with seven layers, usually composed of iceberg lettuce, peas, tomatoes, onions, Cheddar cheese, bacon, and mayonnaise. Served in a glass bowl with high sides.
Shrimp Louie	Shrimp Louie	West	San Francisco and Seattle	Iceberg lettuce with Pacific pink shrimp or other small boiled and shelled shrimp, hard boiled eggs, tomatoes, and Louis dressing; basically the same ingredients as a Crab Louie salad, but with shrimp instead of Dungeness crab
Taco salad	Taco salad	Southwest	Texas	A fried flour tortilla shell stuffed with shredded iceberg lettuce and topped with diced tomatoes, shredded Cheddar cheese, sour cream, guacamole, and salsa. Topped with ground beef, shredded chicken, beans, and/or Spanish rice.
Texas caviar	Texas caviar	Southwest	Texas	A bean salad consisting of black-eyed peas lightly pickled in a vinaigrette-style dressing, often eaten as a dip accompaniment to tortilla chips.
Waldorf salad	Waldorf salad	Northeast	New York City	First created between 1893 and 1896 at the Waldorf Hotel in New York City, it is generally made of fresh apples, celery and walnuts, dressed in mayonnaise.
Whitefish salad	Whitefish salad	Northeast	New York City	A salad of smoked freshwater whitefish and mayonnaise. An Ashkenazi Jewish staple.

=== Sandwiches ===
Image	Name	General Region	Associated regions	Description
Bacon egg and cheese	Bacon egg and cheese	Northeast	New York City	A sandwich made with bacon, eggs (usually fried or scrambled), and cheese on a kaiser roll. Typically with salt, pepper, and ketchup.
Beef Manhattan	Beef Manhattan	Midwest	Indianapolis, Indiana	An open-faced sandwich of roast beef and gravy, served with mashed potatoes.
Beef on weck	Beef on weck	Northeast	Buffalo, New York	Thin-sliced roast beef on a Kümmelweck roll (a Kaiser roll topped with caraway seeds and salt). The cut face of the top half of the roll may be dipped in the jus from the roast. Horseradish is usually provided for the diner to spread to taste on the top half of the roll.
Chopped cheese sandwich	Chopped Cheese	Northeast	New York City	Ground beef with onions and often green bell peppers, topped by melted cheese, and served with lettuce, tomatoes and condiments on a hero roll. Often seasoned with adobo.
Chow mein sandwich	Chow mein sandwich	Northeast	Massachusetts, Rhode Island	A brown gravy-based chow mein mixture placed between halves of a hamburger-style bun.
Club sandwich	Club sandwich	Northeast	New York (state)	A three-layer sandwich consisting of three slices of bread (traditionally toasted), sliced poultry, fried bacon, lettuce, tomato, and mayonnaise.
Cuban sandwich	Cuban sandwich	South	Tampa, Florida, South Florida	A pressed sandwich made with sliced ham and roasted pork, Swiss cheese, pickles, mustard, and sometimes Genoa salami, on Cuban bread. Medianoche sandwiches are very closely related.
Denver sandwich	Denver sandwich	Southwest	Denver	Also known as a Western sandwich. A Denver omelette (scrambled eggs with diced ham, onions, and green bell peppers) on two pieces of bread.
Eggs Benedict	Eggs Benedict	Northeast	New York City	The two halves of a toasted English muffin topped with Canadian bacon, poached eggs, and hollandaise sauce. Claims exist that it was invented at the Waldorf Hotel in New York City in 1894, and another claim is that it was first made by Edward P. Montgomery on behalf of commodore E. C. Benedict.
A fluffernutter, before assembly	Fluffernutter	Northeast	New England	Made with peanut butter and marshmallow fluff, usually served on white bread
Fool's Gold Loaf	Fool's Gold Loaf	Southwest	Denver	A French bread, baked and hollowed out, and filled with a jar of peanut butter, a jar of grape jelly, and a pound of bacon.
French dip sandwich with jus on the side	French dip	Southwest	Los Angeles, San Diego	Thin-sliced beef served on a French roll, often topped with Swiss cheese and onions. Traditionally, the bread is dipped in the beef juice that results from cooking, though it's not unusual for the jus to be served on the side.
Fried-brain sandwiches, with side orders of onion rings and German fries	Fried-brain sandwich	Midwest	Evansville, Indiana, Ohio River valley	A sandwich made with heavily battered sliced calves' brains, deep fried and served on sliced bread.
Gerber sandwich	Gerber sandwich	Midwest	St. Louis	An open-faced sandwich of a half section of Italian or French bread, spread with garlic butter and topped with ham and either Provel or Provolone cheese, seasoned with a sprinkling of paprika, and then toasted.
Heel sandwich from Naples Spaghetti House, Steubenville, Ohio	Heel sandwich	Multiple	Steubenville, Ohio; Weirton, West Virginia	A thick, crusty "heel" of a loaf of Italian bread hollowed out and stuffed with meatballs, marinara sauce, and melted provolone or mozzarella cheese that is then broiled.
Horseshoe sandwich	Horseshoe sandwich	Midwest	Springfield, Illinois	An open-faced sandwich of thick-sliced toasted bread, a hamburger patty or other meat, French fries, and a cheese sauce that is somewhat similar to Welsh rarebit.
Hot brown	Hot brown	South	Louisville, Kentucky	An open-faced sandwich of turkey with sliced tomatoes on thick-cut toast, covered with Mornay sauce and topped with bacon, and baked or broiled until the bread is crisp and the sauce begins to brown.
Italian beef sandwich	Italian beef	Midwest	Chicago	A sandwich of thin slices of seasoned roast beef, dripping with meat juices, on a dense, long Italian-style roll.
Jibarito	Jibarito	Midwest	Chicago	A jibarito (/ˌhiːbəˈriːtoʊ/ HEE-bə-REE-toh) is a sandwich, inspired by the cuisine of Puerto Rico, made with flattened, fried green plantains instead of bread. Generally with a thin steak filling, or sometimes chicken or pork. Usually topped with garlic-flavored mayonnaise, lettuce, and tomato.
Limburger sandwich	Limburger sandwich	Midwest	Wisconsin	Limburger cheese on bread
Mother-in-law	Mother-in-law	Midwest	Chicago	A tamale in a hot dog bun, covered with chili.
Muffuletta sandwich	Muffuletta	South	New Orleans	A sandwich on a muffuletta bread, a large, round, and light Italian bread with sesame seeds. It's filled with various meats and cheeses, usually including ham, salami, mortadella, Swiss cheese, and provolone, with olive salad spread on the bread.
Pastrami on rye	Pastrami on rye	Northeast	New York City	Pastrami on rye bread, typically with spicy brown mustard.
Pepper and egg sandwich	Pepper and egg sandwich	Midwest	Chicago	Scrambled eggs and grilled bell peppers on French bread.
Puritan sandwich	Pilgrim sandwich	Northeast	New England	Also known as a Thanksgiving sandwich. Made with sliced turkey, stuffing, cranberry sauce, and sometimes cheese and other ingredients.
A pit beef sandwich	Pit beef sandwich	South	Baltimore	A sandwich of charcoal-roasted beef, sliced and served rare on a Kaiser roll.
An alligator po' boy sandwich, with French fries and vegetable garnish	Po' boy	South	New Orleans	A submarine sandwich on a wide piece of French bread that is crunchy on the outside and light on the inside. Popular fillings include fried seafood such as shrimp, oysters, or catfish, and the more traditional roast beef with brown gravy. Usually topped ("dressed") with shredded lettuce, tomatoes, pickles, and mayonnaise.
Pork tenderloin sandwich with French fries	Pork tenderloin sandwich	Midwest	Iowa and Indiana	A large, thin pork cutlet, breaded and deep-fried, served on a bun.
Primanti sandwich	Primanti Sandwich	Northeast	Pittsburgh, Pennsylvania	Grilled meat, melted cheese, an oil & vinegar-based coleslaw, tomato slices, and French fries between two thick slices of Italian bread.
Reuben sandwich	Reuben sandwich	Multiple	New York City and Omaha, Nebraska	A hot sandwich composed of corned beef, Swiss cheese, sauerkraut, and Russian or Thousand Island dressing, grilled between slices of rye bread. One account holds that Reuben Kulakofsky of Omaha, Nebraska invented the sandwich, and another holds that it was invented by Arnold Reuben at Reuben's Restaurant in New York City.
Runza	Runza	Midwest	Nebraska and Kansas	A hand-held meat pie similar to a bierock, with a yeast dough bread pocket and a filling of ground beef, shredded cabbage, and seasonings.
Sailor sandwich with French fries	Sailor sandwich	South	Richmond, Virginia	A sandwich of grilled knackwurst, hot pastrami, melted Swiss cheese, and spicy mustard on rye bread.
Sloppy joe	Sloppy joe	Northeast	Northern New Jersey	In most of the U.S., a sloppy joe is a sandwich of ground beef and tomato sauce, with onion and spices, served on a hamburger bun. But in North Jersey, a sloppy joe is a double decker thin sliced rye bread sandwich made with one or more types of sliced deli meat, such as turkey, ham, pastrami, corned beef, roast beef, or sliced beef tongue, along with Swiss cheese, coleslaw, and Russian dressing.
Spaghetti sandwich	Spaghetti sandwich	Midwest	Minneapolis, Minnesota	A sandwich prepared with cooked spaghetti, sauce and bread.
A chicken spiedie	Spiedie	Northeast	Binghamton, New York	A spiedie (/ˈspiːdi/ SPEE-dee) is a sandwich of marinated cubes of lamb, chicken, pork, or beef served on Italian bread or white bread.
St. Paul sandwich	St. Paul sandwich	Midwest	St. Louis	An egg foo young patty on white bread, with dill pickle slices, lettuce, tomatoes, and mayonnaise.
Submarine sandwich	Submarine sandwich	Northeast	Northeastern United States	Also known as a sub, wedge, hoagie, hero, grinder, baguette and other names, it originated in several different Italian American communities in the Northeastern United States from the late 19th to mid-20th centuries. A long roll of bread split widthwise into two pieces, and filled with a variety of meats, cheeses, vegetables, seasonings, and sauces.
Tavern sandwich	Tavern sandwich	Midwest	Iowa	Also known as a loosemeat sandwich, it contains crumbled, unseasoned ground beef on a bun, mixed with sauteed onions, and sometimes topped with pickles, ketchup and mustard.
Tomato sandwich	Tomato sandwich	South	Southern United States	Ripe-to-overripe non-commercially grown tomatoes, mayonnaise, salt, and pepper on soft commercial white bread.
	Turkey Devonshire	Northeast	Pittsburgh	A hot open-faced sandwich on toasted bread with hot turkey, bacon, tomatoes, and a cheese sauce, similar to a Hot brown.

=== Soups and stews ===
Image	Name	General Region	Associated regions	Description
Bookbinder soup	Bookbinder soup	Northeast	Philadelphia, Pennsylvania	Seafood soup made with common snapping turtle meat.
	Booyah	Midwest	Michigan, Minnesota, Wisconsin	A thick soup that often requires up to two days and multiple cooks to prepare; it is cooked in specially designed "booyah kettles" and usually meant to serve hundreds or even thousands of people.
Brunswick stew made with chicken	Brunswick stew	South	Southern United States	A stew based on tomatoes, local beans and vegetables, and chicken in recent times; originally, small game meat such as squirrel, rabbit or opossum was used instead.
Burgoo, with a side of mashed potatoes	Burgoo	Multiple	Kentucky and Illinois	A spicy stew, typically using game or game birds, similar to Irish or Mulligan stew, often served with cornbread or corn muffins. [The image at the left depicts burgoo with a side of mashed potatoes.]
Catfish stew	Catfish stew	South	Southern United States	A dish that consists of catfish fillets. which are heavily boiled so that they fall apart, and is then combined with crushed tomatoes, potatoes, and onions.
Chili con carne	Chili con carne	Southwest	Texas	Originated in Texas and is the official dish of the U.S. state of Texas, as designated by the House Concurrent Resolution Number 18 of the 65th Texas Legislature during its regular session in 1977.
Conch soup	Conch soup	South	Key West, Florida	A soup made from conch, a type of sea snail.
Corn chowder	Corn chowder	Northeast	New England	A corn-based chowder with cream.
Cream of crab soup	Cream of crab soup	South	Maryland	A dish from the Eastern Shore of Maryland. It is made with lump Maryland blue crab meat, onion, whole milk and/or half and half (milk and cream blend), butter, either flour or corn starch as a thickener, and Old Bay as the main seasoning.
Gumbo	Gumbo	South	Louisiana	A meat or seafood soup or stew thickened with okra or filé.
Manhattan clam chowder	Manhattan-style clam chowder	Northeast	New York City	Clams cooked in a red broth with tomatoes for flavor and color.
Maryland crab soup	Maryland crab soup	South	Maryland	A soup made with lump Maryland crab meat, tomatoes, corn, potato, cellery or celery leaves, peas, onion, and Old Bay. The main liquid of the soup can be water, shellfish stock, or fish stock. Other seasoning options used include red pepper, bay leaf, thyme, garlic, dry mustard, and/or salt.
Matzah ball soup	Matzah ball soup	Northeast	New York City	Staple food on Passover. The Matzah ball dumplings are traditionally served in chicken broth with sliced carrots, garnished with chopped parsley. Matzo balls are also referred to as knaidel or knaedle.
New England clam chowder	New England-style clam chowder	Northeast	New England	A milk- or cream-based chowder of potatoes, onion, and clams.
Oyster stew	Oyster stew	Multiple	New England, Southern United States	A stew made with oysters.
Peanut soup	Peanut soup	South	Virginia	A soup made from peanuts, often with various other ingredients.
	Philadelphia Pepper Pot	Northeast	Philadelphia, Pennsylvania	A thick stew of beef tripe, vegetables, pepper and other seasonings.
Saimin	Saimin	West	Hawaii	Traditionally consisting of soft wheat egg noodles served in a hot dashi garnished with diced green onions and a thin slice of kamaboko, modern versions of saimin include additional toppings such as char siu, sliced Spam, sliced egg, bok choy, mushrooms, or shredded nori.
She-crab soup	She-crab soup	South	Charleston, South Carolina	A seafood soup made with blue crab meat, crab roe, and crab stock mixed with heavy cream and dry sherry.
	Sonofabitch stew	West	Western United States	A cowboy dish of the Old West. A beef stew, the ingredients of which depended on availability. Sometimes made with offal from a calf.
Vichyssoise	Vichyssoise	Northeast	New York City	Vichyssoise (/viːʃiːˈswɑːz/ vee-shee-SWAHZ) is a thick soup made of puréed leeks, onions, potatoes, cream, and chicken stock. Its origins is a subject of debate among culinary historians; Julia Child calls it "an American invention", whereas others observe that "the origin of the soup is questionable in whether it's genuinely French or an American creation".
Yaka mein	Yaka mein	South	New Orleans	A soup that combines influences of Chinese and Creole cuisine. Stewed beef in beef-based broth with noodles, garnished with half a hard-boiled egg and chopped green onions, with Creole or Cajun seasoning.

=== Steak dishes ===
Image	Name	General Region	Associated regions	Description
Beef and broccoli	Beef and broccoli	West	San Francisco	Stir-fried sliced steak an broccoli florets with oyster or soy sauce and aromatics such as garlic and ginger.
Philly cheesesteak sandwich	Cheesesteak	Northeast	Philadelphia	Also known as a Philly cheesesteak. Thinly sliced beef and melted cheese (generally Cheez Whiz, American cheese, or Provolone) on a hoagie roll, typically with sauteed onions and other seasonings.
Chicken fried steak topped with gravy	Chicken fried steak	Southwest	Texas, Oklahoma	A breaded cutlet dish consisting of a piece of tenderized cube steak coated with seasoned flour and pan fried.
Chili burger with fries	Chili burger	Southwest	Los Angeles, California	Also known as a chili size. A hamburger (or cheeseburger) topped with chili con carne.
Delmonico steak	Delmonico steak	Northeast	New York City	A method of preparation from one of several cuts of beef (typically the Rib Cut) prepared Delmonico style, made by Delmonico's Restaurant in New York City during the mid-19th century.
A finger steak	Finger steaks	West	Southern Idaho	Small strips of steak (usually sirloin), battered with a tempura-like batter and deep-fried in oil. Typically served with French fries and fry sauce, and a thick piece of buttered toast.
Fried onion burger	Fried onion burger	Southwest	Oklahoma	Thinly sliced yellow onion is piled onto a small thick patty of ground beef, set onto the hot grill, and pressed hard to form a large thin patty with the onions embedded into the meat.The burger is approximately half onion.
Juicy Lucy	Jucy Lucy	Midwest	Minneapolis	A cheeseburger that has the cheese inside the meat patty instead of on top.
Loco moco, with macaroni salad and boiled soba noodles	Loco moco	West	Hawaii	There are many variations, but the traditional loco moco consists of white rice, topped with a hamburger patty, a fried egg, and brown gravy
Negimaki	Negimaki	Northeast	New York City	A Japanese-American food consisting of broiled strips of meat marinated in teriyaki sauce and rolled with scallions (negi). Originally beef was used, but negimaki are also commonly made with other meat such as chicken.
Office burger	Office burger	Southwest	Los Angeles	A burger of dry-aged beef, blue cheese and Gruyère cheese, caramelized onions, applewood bacon compote and served on a toasted oblong shaped French baguette. Father's Office has a no-modification policy for the Office Burger that will not allow substitutions or add-ons of any kind such as ketchup.
Oostburger	Oostburger	Midwest	Oostburg, Wisconsin	A sandwich consisting of a hamburger or cheeseburger topped with a butterflied bratwurst, typically served on a hard roll with condiments.
Pastrami burger	Pastrami burger	Southwest	Utah	A burger with cheese and thin-sliced pastrami on top, commonly served at Greek burger restaurants in Utah.
Pork steak	Pork steak	Midwest	St. Louis	A steak made from a slice of pork shoulder; often smoked or slow-cooked with barbecue sauce.
Slopper	Slopper	Southwest	Colorado	A cheeseburger (or hamburger) served smothered in red chile or green chile or chili sauce.
Slugburger	Slugburger	South	Mississippi	A deep-fried patty containing beef or pork and a plant-based filler ingredient such as potato or cornmeal.
Steak de Burgo	Steak de Burgo	Midwest	Des Moines, Iowa	Usually consists of a beef tenderloin either topped with butter, garlic, and Italian herbs, or served in a sauce consisting of those same ingredients.
Steak Diane	Steak Diane	Northeast	New York City	A pan-fried beefsteak with a sauce made from the seasoned pan juices, generally prepared in restaurants tableside, and flambéed. It does not appear in the classics of French cuisine, and was probably invented in mid-20th century New York City as part of the fad for tableside-flambéed dishes.
Steamed cheeseburger	Steamed cheeseburger	Northeast	Central Connecticut	Ground beef is steamed on a tray to create a juicy patty without any grease. Steamed cheese, raw onion and mustard toppings are added afterwards.

== Regional dishes by region ==
Midwest

- Almond chicken
- Beef Manhattan
- Beer brat
- Booyah
- Brier Hill-style pizza
- Broasted chicken
- Bumpy Cake
- Chicago-style barbecue
- Chicago-style hot dog
- Chicago-style pizza
- Chicken Vesuvio
- Chislic
- Cincinnati chili
- Coney
- Coney Island hot dog
- Cookie salad
- Detroit-style pizza
- Fish boil
- Fried-brain sandwich
- Fried cheese curds
- Glorified rice
- Goetta
- Gooey butter cake
- Gerber sandwich
- Hoosier-style barbecue
- Horseshoe sandwich
- Hotdish
- Italian beef
- Jibarito
- Johnny Marzetti
- Jucy Lucy
- Kansas City-style barbecue
- Limburger sandwich
- Maxwell Street Polish
- Michigan salad
- Minnesota sushi
- Mother-in-law
- Oostburger
- Pasty
- Pemmican
- Pepper and egg sandwich
- Pizza bagel
- Pizza puff
- Polish Boy
- Pork steak
- Pork tenderloin sandwich
- Quad City-style pizza
- Runza
- Shaker lemon pie
- Shrimp DeJonghe
- Slinger
- Snickers salad
- Spaghetti sandwich
- Springfield-style cashew chicken
- Steak de Burgo
- St. Louis-style barbecue
- St. Louis-style pizza
- St. Paul sandwich
- Strawberry delight
- Sugar cream pie
- Taco pizza
- Tavern sandwich
- Toasted ravioli
- Watergate salad
- Wet burrito

Northeast

- American chop suey
- Anadama bread
- Bacon egg and cheese
- Baked Alaska
- Baked ziti
- Beef on weck
- Black and white cookie
- Blackout cake
- Blueberry pie
- Bookbinder soup
- Boston baked beans
- Boston cream doughnut
- Boston cream pie
- Buffalo wings
- Bulkie roll
- Cheesesteak
- Chicken Divan
- Chicken Francese
- Chicken parmesan
- Chicken riggies
- Chopped cheese
- Chow mein sandwich
- Clambake
- Clam cakes
- Clam pie
- Clams casino
- Club sandwich
- Corn chowder
- Cronut
- Delmonico steak
- Disco fries
- Egg roll
- Eggs Benedict
- Fluffernutter
- Fried clams
- Funnel cake
- Garbage Plate
- General Tso's chicken
- Grandma pizza
- Grape pie
- Halal over rice
- Ham loaf
- Italian hot dog
- Italian ice
- Jello salad
- Jersey breakfast dog
- Lobster Fra Diavolo
- Lobster Newberg
- Lobster roll
- Lox and schmear bagel
- Manhattan-style clam chowder
- Matzah ball soup
- Michigan hot dog
- Mon Valley Red Top
- Needham
- Negimaki
- New England boiled dinner
- New England-style clam chowder
- New Haven-style pizza
- New York roll
- New York–style bagel
- New York-style cheesecake
- New York-style pizza
- New York System wiener
- Parker House roll
- Pasta primavera
- Pastrami on rye
- Pastry heart
- Philadelphia Pepper Pot
- Pilgrim sandwich
- Pittsburgh salad
- Pork roll
- Potatoes O'Brien
- Primanti sandwich
- Ripper
- Roasted chestnuts
- Roast pork Italian
- Salt potatoes
- Salt water taffy
- Sausage and peppers
- Schnitz un knepp
- Shoofly pie
- Sloppy joe
- Snickerdoodle
- Spaghetti and meatballs
- Spiedie
- Steak Diane
- Steamed cheeseburger
- Steamed clams
- Strawberry rhubarb pie
- Stromboli
- Stuffies
- Submarine sandwich
- Sugar on snow
- Texas Tommy
- Toll House cookie
- Tomato pie
- Turkey Devonshire
- Utica greens
- Vichyssoise
- Waldorf salad
- Whitefish salad
- White hot
- Whoopie pie

South

- Alabama-style barbecue
- Ambrosia
- Banana pudding
- Bananas Foster
- Barbecue spaghetti
- Bean pie
- Beaten biscuits
- Beignet
- Biscuits and gravy
- Boiled peanuts
- Boudin
- Bourbon chicken
- Brunswick stew
- Buttermilk pie
- Carolina-style hot dog
- Catfish stew
- Charleston red rice
- Cheese straws
- Chess pie
- Chicken Maryland
- Chicken mull
- Chitterlings
- Coconut cake
- Conch soup
- Cornbread
- Country Captain
- Crab cakes
- Crawfish pie
- Cream of crab soup
- Cuban sandwich
- Deviled crab
- Dirty rice
- Doberge cake
- Eggs Sardou
- Étouffée
- Fried chicken
- Fried green tomatoes
- Fried okra
- Frogmore stew
- Grape hull pie
- Grillades
- Grits
- Gumbo
- Half-smoke
- Hog jowl
- Honey bun
- Hoppin' John
- Hot brown
- Hot chicken
- Hot water corn bread
- Hummingbird cake
- Hushpuppy
- Jambalaya
- Kentucky jam cake
- Key lime pie
- King cake
- Lady Baltimore cake
- Lamb fries
- Lane cake
- Lemon ice box pie
- Lemon pepper wings
- Lemon stick
- Livermush
- Maryland crab soup
- Memphis-style barbecue
- Mississippi mud pie
- Modjeska
- Moravian chicken pie
- Moravian sugar cake
- Muffuletta
- Natchitoches meat pie
- North Carolina-style Barbecue
- Oysters Bienville
- Oysters en brochette
- Oysters Rockefeller
- Peanut pie
- Peanut soup
- Pickled pigs' feet
- Pimento cheese
- Pistolette
- Pit beef sandwich
- Po' boy
- Popcorn shrimp
- Pulled pork sandwich
- Red beans and rice
- Red velvet cake
- Rice and gravy
- Rolled oyster
- Sailor sandwich
- Seven-layer salad
- She-crab soup
- Shrimp and grits
- Shrimp Creole
- Slugburger
- Smith Island cake
- South Carolina-style Barbecue
- Southern tomato pie
- Spoonbread
- Sweet potato pie
- Tarte à la Bouillie
- Tipsy cake
- Tomato sandwich
- Yaka mein

Southwest

- Arizona cheese crisp
- Barbecue bologna
- Bizcochito
- Borracho beans
- Breakfast burrito
- Cactus fries
- Carne asada burrito
- Carne asada fries
- Chicken fried bacon
- Chicken fried steak
- Chiffon pie
- Chili burger
- Chili con carne
- Chimichanga
- Chinese chicken salad
- Cobb salad
- Cowboy beans
- Crab Rangoon
- Denver sandwich
- Dodger Dog
- Fajita
- Fool's Gold Loaf
- French dip
- Fried onion burger
- Frito pie
- Frozen banana
- Jalapeño poppers
- King Ranch chicken
- Klobásník
- Korean taco
- Machacado con huevo
- Nachos
- Office burger
- Pan de campo
- Pastrami burger
- Rocky Mountain oysters
- Santa Maria-style barbecue
- Slopper
- Sonoran hot dog
- Taco salad
- Tamale pie
- Texas caviar
- Texas-style barbecue
- Texas toast
- Tuna tartare

West

- Bear claw
- Beef and broccoli
- California roll
- California-style pizza
- Celery Victor
- Chantilly cake
- Cioppino
- Crab Louie
- Dutch baby pancake
- Finger steaks
- Fortune cookie
- Frogeye salad
- Frybread
- Funeral potatoes
- Hangtown fry
- Happy Cake
- Haupia
- Hawaiian haystack
- Japanese-style hot dog
- Joe's Special
- Kulolo
- Laulau
- Loco moco
- Lomi-lomi salmon
- Manapua
- Mission burrito
- Piki
- Poke
- Saimin
- Seattle roll
- Seattle-style hot dog
- Seattle-style teriyaki
- Shrimp Louie
- Sonofabitch stew
- Spam musubi
- Squid lū'au

Multiple regions

- American goulash
- Bagel dog
- Burgoo
- Chicken and dumplings
- Chicken and waffles
- City chicken
- Heel sandwich
- Hot milk cake
- Johnnycakes
- Jo Jo potatoes
- Ohio Valley-style pizza
- Oyster stew
- Pecan pie
- Pepperoni roll
- Pudding corn
- Reuben sandwich
- Scrapple
- Stack cake
- Succotash

== See also ==
- American Chinese cuisine
- Barbecue in the United States
- Cajun cuisine
- Carolina style
- Cuisine of the Midwestern United States
- Cuisine of New England
- Cuisine of New Orleans
- Cuisine of New York City
- Cuisine of the Pacific Northwest
- Cuisine of the Pennsylvania Dutch
- Cuisine of Philadelphia
- Cuisine of the Southern United States
- Cuisine of the Southwestern United States
- Cuisine of the Thirteen Colonies
- Cuisine of the Western United States
- Hawaii regional cuisine
  - Native cuisine of Hawaii
- Hot dog variations § United States
- Italian-American cuisine
- List of American foods
- List of American regional and fusion cuisines
- List of regional beverages of the United States
- Louisiana Creole cuisine
- Lowcountry cuisine
- Minnesotan cuisine
  - List of Minnesotan dishes
- Native American cuisine
- Pizza in the United States
- Puerto Rican cuisine
- Soul food
  - List of soul foods and dishes
- Tex-Mex
- Traditional food
