= Honke Nishio Yatsuhashi =

Company in Kyoto, Japan

Honke Yatsuhashi Nishio Co., Ltd.
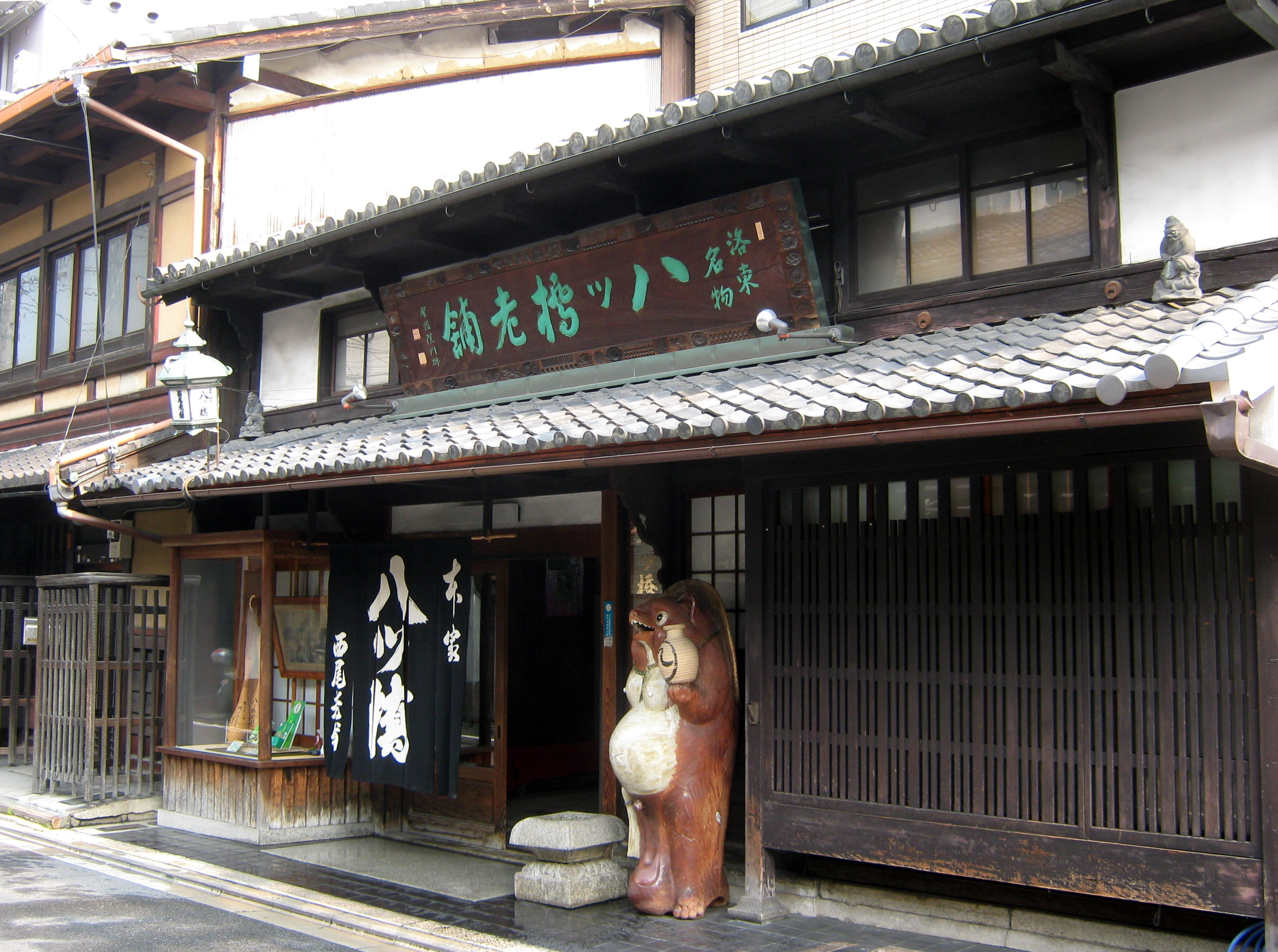
- Native name: 本家八ッ橋西尾株式会社
- Industry: Production and retail of traditional Japanese confectionery
- Founded: 1689 (established 1953)
- Headquarters: 7 Shogoin Nishimachi, Sakyō-ku, Kyoto, Japan
- Website: https://www.8284.co.jp/

Honke Yatsuhashi Nishio Co., Ltd (本家八ッ橋西尾株式会社 ほんけにしおやつはしかぶしきがいしゃ honke yatsuhashi nishio kabushiki-gaisha) is a manufacturer and seller of the wagashi Yatsuhashi, with more than 300 years of history. Its headquarters are located in the Sakyō-ku ward of Kyoto.

== History ==
The company was first founded in the year 1689. The name “Yatsuhashi”, meaning "eight bridges", originates from the tale of "The Incident at the Eight Bridges of Mikawa" (三河国八つ橋の事故). Notably, in the year 1900 the company won silver medal at the Paris Exposition. As a corporation, it was established in 1953.

== Present Day ==
Currently the company is managed by its 14th generation president, Ms. Yoko Nishio and has 16 stores around Kyoto, employing a total of 70 workers. Along with the traditional flavors, this brand offers a variety of options, such as black sesame, matcha, chocobanana (chocolate-covered frozen banana), peach, mango and others.

Additionally, there are other companies that produce and commercialize Yatsuhashi sweets, making similar claims regarding the founding year and origin of this traditional confectionery. Notable examples are Bijū, Izutsu Yatsuhashi Honpo and Shogoin Yatsuhashi Sohonten.
