= Natchitoches meat pie =

Turnover from Louisiana, United States

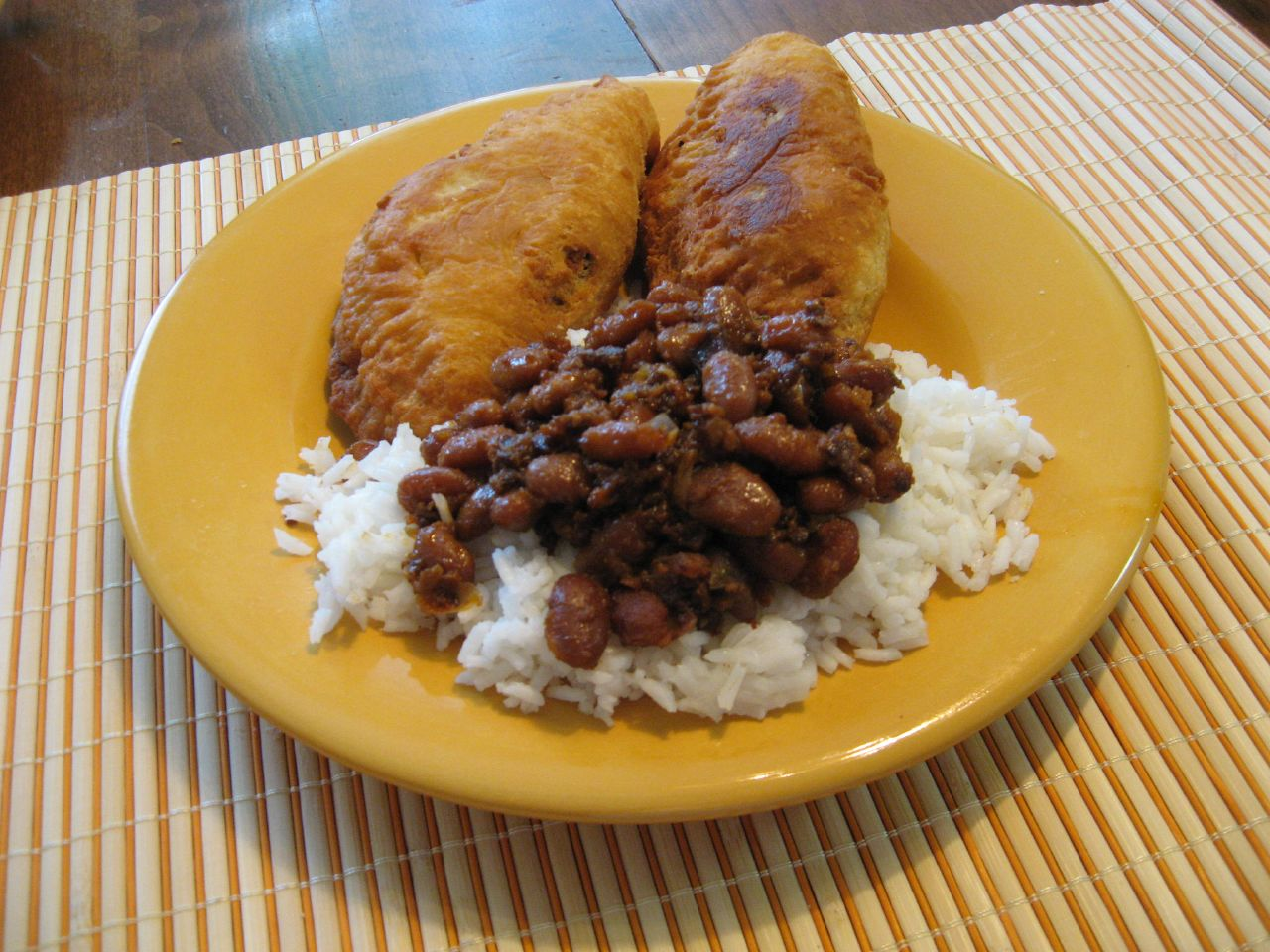
- Natchitoches meat pie with New Orleans beans and rice
- Type: Turnover
- Place of origin: United States
- Region or state: Louisiana
- Main ingredients: Flaky pastry, ground beef, ground pork, onions, peppers, garlic, oil

The Natchitoches meat pie is a regional turnover from northern Louisiana, in the United States. It is one of the official state foods of Louisiana.

== Ingredients ==
Ingredients include ground beef, ground pork, onions, peppers, garlic, oil, and a pie shell. Natchitoches meat pies are often fried in peanut oil because of that oil's high smoking temperature. A number of restaurants in the historic district in Natchitoches serve meat pies, and frozen pies are available from grocers in northern Louisiana.

It has a savory meat filling in a crescent-shaped, flaky wheat pastry turnover. It is similar to a Spanish picadillo beef empanada. Varieties are found throughout the colonies of the Spanish Empire.

The meat pie is found throughout Louisiana, including southern Louisiana which tends to have a spicier version compared to its northern counterpart, but its origins are found to be from Northern Louisiana. Although found in Greater New Orleans today, The Picayune's Creole Cook Book published in 1901 by The Times-Picayune of New Orleans does not contain a recipe for a Natchitoches-style meat pie in its list of over 1,000 recipes. Natchitoches meat pies are found in other parts of Southern Louisiana as well as sold at food booths at the New Orleans Jazz & Heritage Festival, and seem to have spread south from Northern Louisiana.

== Modern recipe ==
In the modern recipe, ground pork or pork sausage is blended into the ground beef for additional flavor. Onions, bell pepper and when used garlic and parsley provide aromatics. Ground black pepper and cayenne pepper are added as well. Flour is added to the browned meat and vegetable mixture to dry, thicken and loosely bind the filling. The meat filling can be used in other foods (such as tacos and tamales, among others) but the wheat turnover crust is a defining element. The traditional size is approximately 4 ounces (by weight) on a 5"-6" diameter pastry dough (with the dough circles being cut, traditionally, using an empty coffee can). The filling should be made the day before to allow the flavors of the ingredients to meld. Filling, dough and tools should be chilled before assembly. Warm filling will cause the dough to disintegrate.

In the first part of the 20th century, meat pies were sold from home kitchens or from carts by street vendors. By 1967, Natchitoches meat pies were produced in commercial kitchens. Now, they may be ordered online.

Louisiana Public Broadcasting aired a program January 20, 2007, describing how to make Natchitoches meat pies. It is available on DVD entitled "A Taste of Louisiana with Chef John Folse & Company: Our Food Heritage - The Spanish Shows". An annual Meat Pie Festival, held in September, celebrates the Natchitoches meat pie.

== See also ==
- Crawfish pie
- List of regional dishes of the United States
- Pistolette
