= Chicken Maryland =

Fried chicken dish with cream sauce

- Course: Main course
- Region or state: Maryland
- Main ingredients: Fried chicken, cream gravy

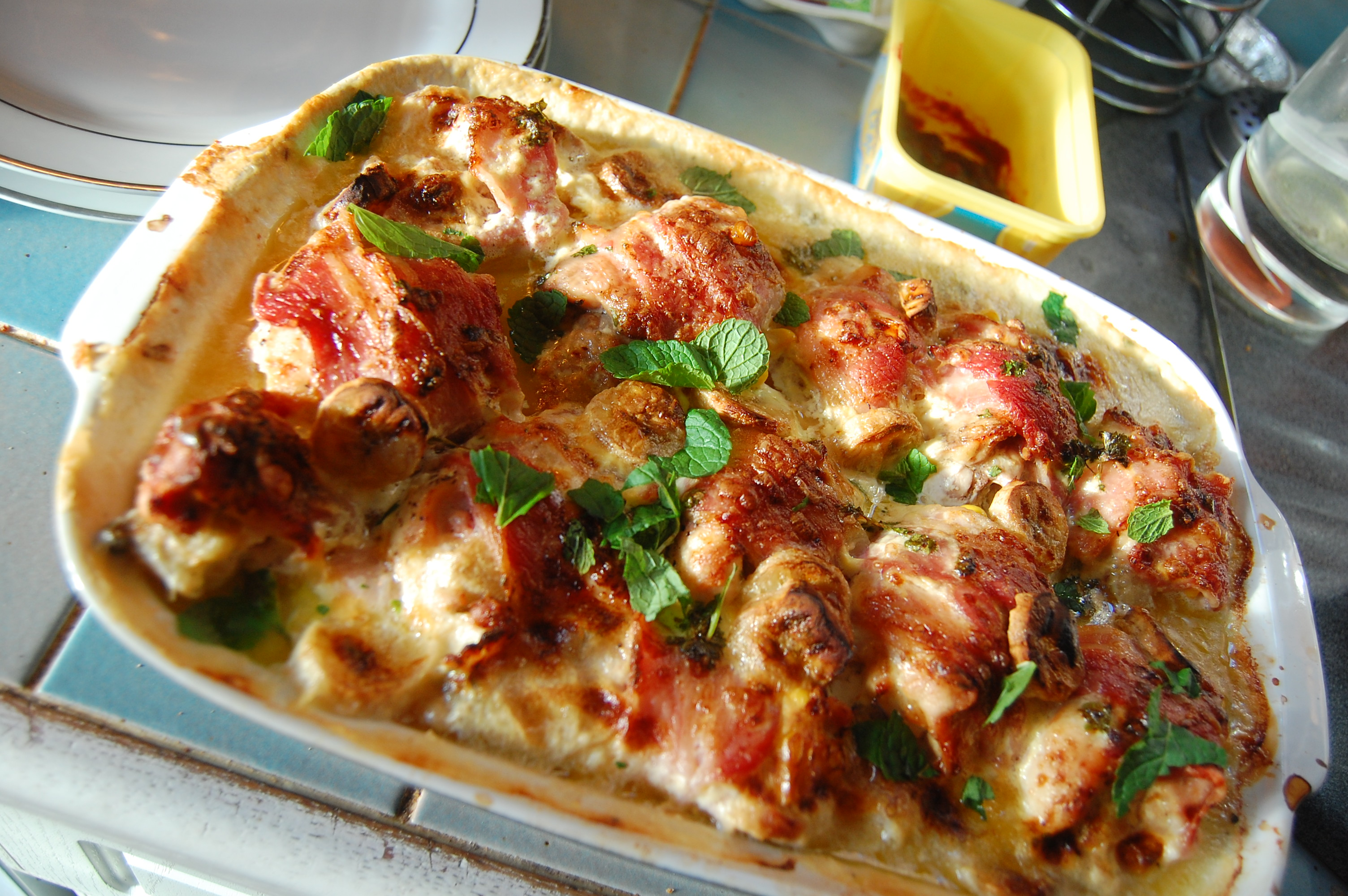

Chicken Maryland or Maryland chicken is a historic dish associated with the U.S. state of Maryland, but has other meanings from other nations. In its home base, the food dish consists of fried chicken served with a cream gravy, while in Argentina the dish is served with a creamy corn gravy. It is traditionally garnished with bananas, which were historically one of Baltimore's leading imports.

== History and preparation ==
Many Maryland families have their own heirloom recipes for this dish. The primary factor that distinguishes Maryland fried chicken is pan-fried in a heavy (traditionally cast-iron) skillet and covered tightly after the initial browning so that the chicken steams as well as fries. Milk or cream is then added to the pan juices to create a white cream gravy, another Maryland characteristic.

Escoffier had a recipe for Poulet sauté Maryland in his landmark cookbook Ma Cuisine.

Chicken à la Maryland was on the menu of the Titanic the day it struck the iceberg.

== Australia ==
In Australia, the term "Chicken Maryland" can simply refer to a butcher's cut for a whole leg consisting of the thigh and drumstick. It can also refer to a meal of crumbed and deep fried chicken Maryland served with a crumbed banana or pineapple ring (or both) and chips. This latter version being a popular pub meal in the 1970s, but less so after the turn of the century.

== United Kingdom ==
In some Chinese restaurants in the United Kingdom (particularly in Scotland), Chicken Maryland can be found under the "European" or "British" section of the menu. It consists of a breaded, deep fried chicken breast served with a slice of bacon, a banana or pineapple fritter (or both) and chips.

== South America ==
In Argentina and in some neighboring South American countries, Suprema de Pollo Maryland is a pounded thin breast of chicken, breaded and fried, served with creamed corn, peas, bacon (pancetta), French fries and a fried banana.

== See also ==
- List of regional dishes of the United States
