= Happy cake =

Hawaiian fruit cake

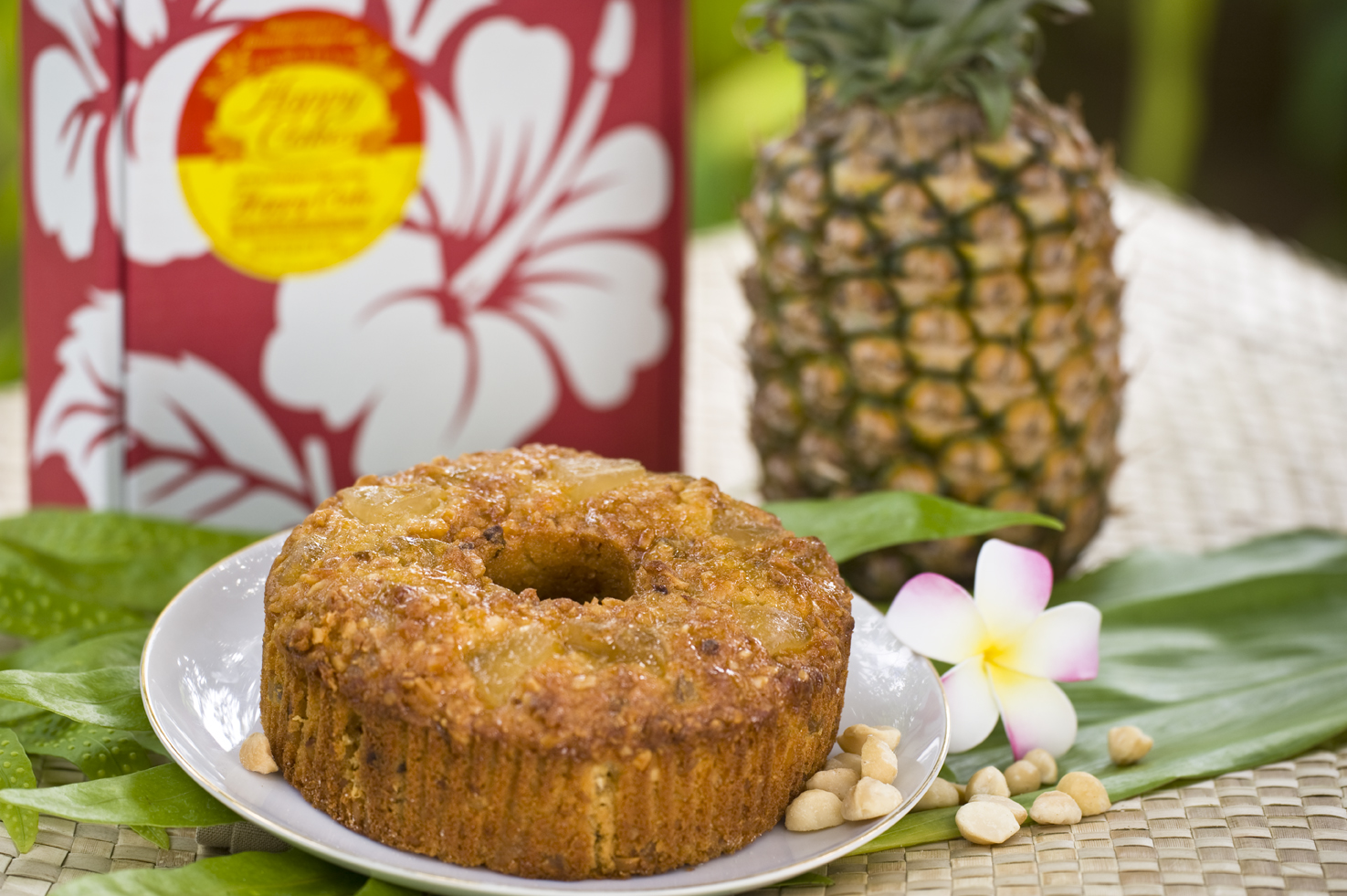
- Happy cake 1967
- Type: Cake
- Place of origin: United States
- Region or state: Hawaii
- Created by: Dick Rodby
- Main ingredients: Pineapple, macadamia nuts, coconut

Happy cake is a tropical fruit cake invented by a Hawaiian restaurateur in 1967. It is often referred to as Hawaii's version of a fruit cake. The Happy Cake is made from pineapple, macadamia nuts, and coconut.

== History ==
The happy cake was invented at Kemo'o Farms Restaurant in Wahiawa, Hawaii in 1967 by Dick Rodby, owner of the restaurant famous for live Hawaiian music. The restaurant was also featured as "Choys" tavern in the Frank Sinatra film From Here to Eternity.

Surrounded by pineapple fields, Rodby was inspired to create his own version of a Hawaiian fruit cake and named it the "happy cake" registering the trademark Happy Cake in September 1969. Cakes were ordered from all over the country as gifts and were popular in Hawaiian themed parties.

== Ingredients ==
The happy cake is a dense cake, made from local pineapple, macadamia nuts, and coconut.

== Fame ==
- Over the years customers have included presidents and Hollywood elite.
- Rodby opened a sister restaurant in California in 1982 to also promote and sell the Hawaiian happy cake.
- Baked in Honolulu, the happy cake still remains popular with local Hawaiians.

== See also ==
- List of regional dishes of the United States
