= Pistolette =

Cuisine in Louisiana, US

- Type: Sandwich
- Place of origin: United States
- Region or state: Louisiana
- Main ingredients: Bread roll, often seafood (crawfish) or meat

A pistolette is either of two bread-based dishes in Louisiana cuisine. One is a fried bread roll, that can also be stuffed, in the Cajun areas around Lafayette and Lake Charles. The other is a type of submarine shaped bread about half the size of a baguette that is popular in New Orleans for Vietnamese bánh mì and other sandwiches. In France and Belgium, the word pistolet refers to a round roll.

== Stuffed and fried bread rolls ==
The Cajun stuffed and fried bread rolls often contain seafood such as crawfish or meat. The roll is split and filled or stuffed with seafood or meat, as well as other items sometimes including cheese or jalapeños.

== Small baguette ==
The French influence on Vietnam is credited for the Vietnamese style bread also referred to as pistolettes that is more like a baguette than the softer white bread used for po'boys. In New Orleans, Dong Phuong Oriental Bakery (a Vietnamese cuisine bakery) supplies pistolettes for the area's banh mi.

== See also ==
- List of regional dishes of the United States
- List of sandwiches
