= Frozen banana =

Banana dessert

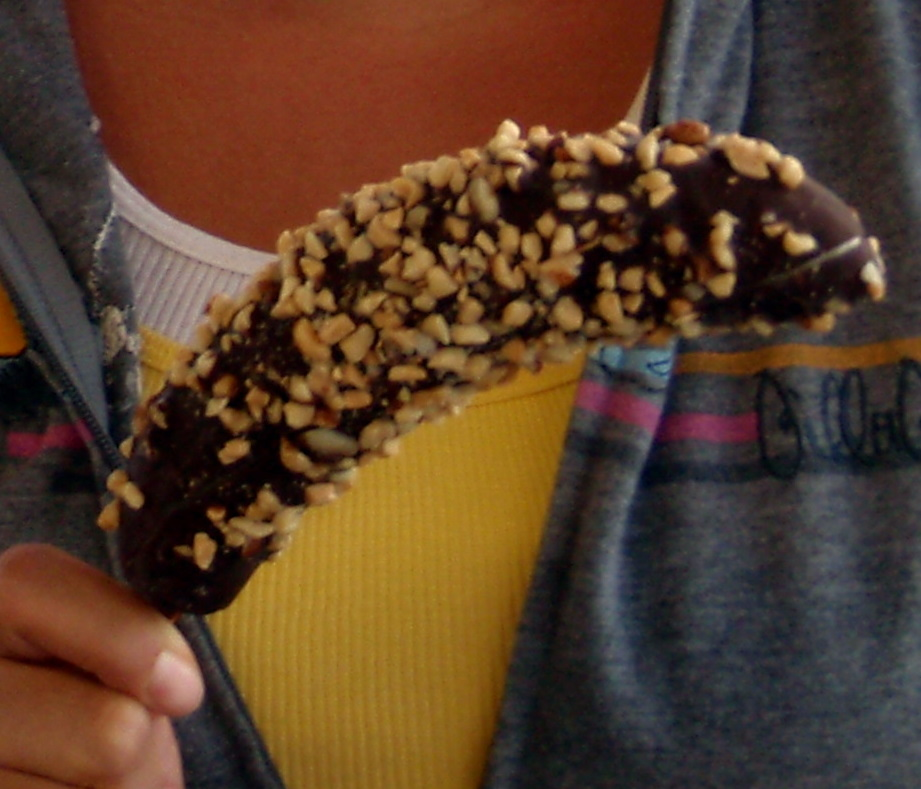
- A frozen banana
- Course: Dessert
- Main ingredients: Bananas, yogurt, chocolate

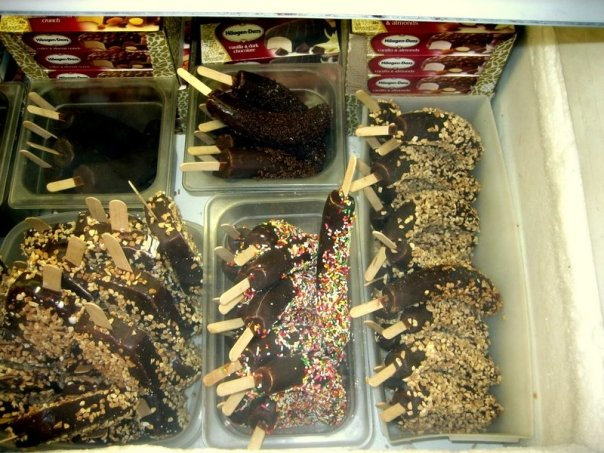
A freezer of frozen bananas with a variety of toppings

Frozen bananas are desserts made by placing a banana upon a stick, freezing it, and usually dipping it in melted chocolate or yogurt. They may be covered with toppings such as dried fruit, chopped nuts, chocolate chips, sprinkles, sugar and crushed cookies.

== History ==
Don Phillips, also known as the frozen banana king, opened the first frozen banana stand - The Original Frozen Banana - on Balboa Peninsula, located in Orange County, California, circa 1940 after seeing them being sold on the Santa Cruz Beach Boardwalk. In 1963, Bob Teller, who moved to the area with plans to manufacture car seat belts, instead opened a frozen banana stand. Teller had sold frozen bananas at the Arizona State Fair, with his wife, Rita, he sold the Frozen Bananas at 25 to 30 cents, depending on the size of the Frozen Banana. and opened his stand - The Original Banana Rolla Rama - right across the street from Phillips' original shop. In the winter months, Teller hauled the trailer to various county fairs. When Phillips died a few years later, Teller bought the business and used it to expand to other locations. Frozen bananas are a tradition on Balboa Island to this day. Bob Fitch created the Frozen Banana in the 1950s on Balboa island maybe earlier. He purchased the spot where the Sugar and Spice sits today from Don Philips, renamed it the Sugar and Spice. Bob Fitch sold the building around 1978-1979 to Mrs. Banto for $110,000.00.

== Cultural references ==
- In the Fox television series Arrested Development, set in Orange County, the Bluth Company owns and runs a frozen banana stand.
- The Brazillan national bobsleigh team is nicknamed "frozen bananas".
- An attempt to recreate the chocolate-covered banana from "The Bear" episode of The Bear recommended adding peanut butter or coconut oil to the melted chocolate for a better dip and a "snappier" chocolate shell.

== See also ==
- List of regional dishes of the United States
