= Pan de campo =

Flatbread from Texas, United States

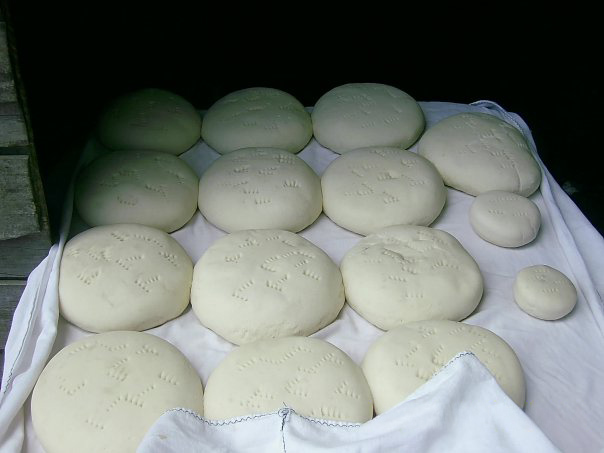
- Main ingredients: wheat flour
- Ingredients generally used: baking powder, salt, shortening, water

Pan de campo is a flatbread with a name that is thought of as country bread, camp bread, or cowboy bread. The bread was a regional staple of cowboy and vaqueros of southern Texas. Celebrated in several southern Texas festivals, it was named an official symbol of Texas in 2005.

== Description ==
Pan de campo is a flatbread made from wheat flour, baking powder, salt, a fat, and water. Traditionally it was cooked in a dutch oven. The resulting round loaf is 1 to 1 1/2 inches thick. The flavor is biscuit-like.

== In culture ==
The Tejano origins of the dish have become part of Tex-Mex fusion. In Larry McMurtry's novel, Lonesome Dove, the Mexican cook prepares the bread for wranglers.

Sourdough bread was more widespread on cattle drives in Texas than the regional pan de campo. They were consumed along with other breads including tortillas, hoe cakes, and cornbread. In June 2005, Governor Rick Perry signed legislation making pan de campo the official state bread of Texas.
