= Pittsburgh salad =

Salad containing french fries

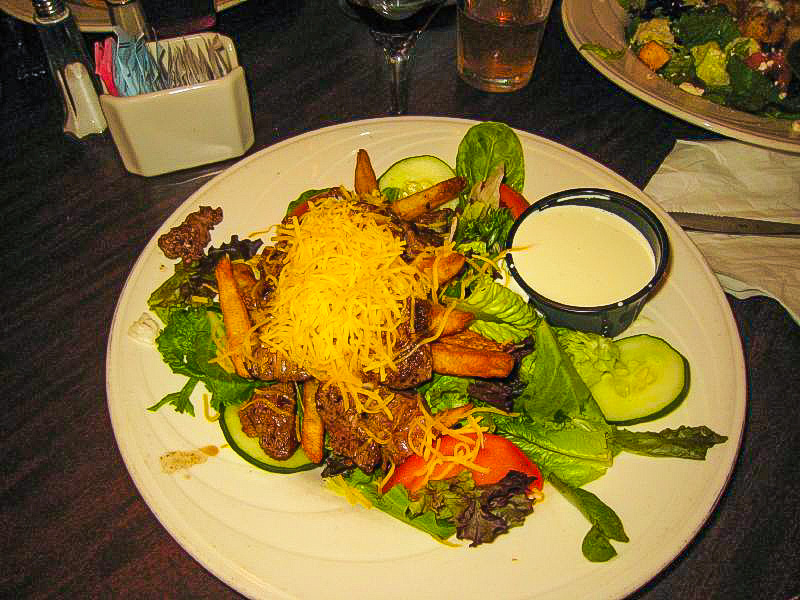
- Type: Salad
- Place of origin: United States
- Region or state: Western Pennsylvania
- Main ingredients: Lettuce, french fries, ham, grilled steak, chicken or fish, cheese, Ranch dressing

A Pittsburgh salad is a layered salad, often composed of lettuce, vegetables, grilled meat, shredded cheese, ranch dressing, and most notably, french fries. It is a regional dish from the Western Pennsylvania area, although it can be seen in other places around the United States.

The salad is customizable in terms of the quality of the ingredients. The fries themselves can be curly, waffle, or shoestring. The fries add warmth, texture, saltiness, and bulk to the salad.

In Pittsburgh, it was not historically referred to as a “Pittsburgh salad”. It is often on menus as "steak salad" or "chicken salad". Pamela's Diner, Whitfield, and Eat'n Park are local restaurants that serve or have served this dish.

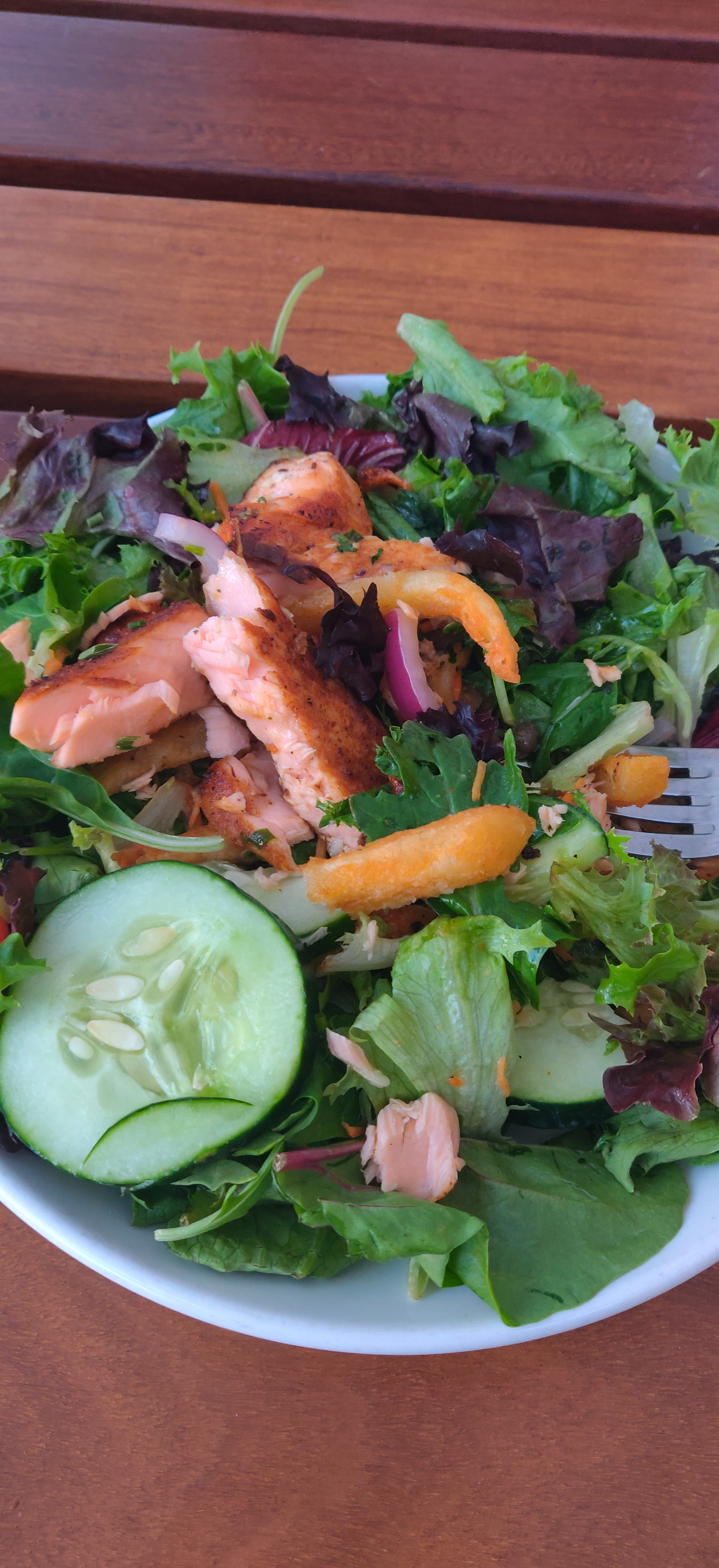
An example of Pittsburgh salad with fries and salmon

The origin is not known, but one story involves Jerry's Curb Service in Beaver, Pennsylvania. Legend has it that one night in the early 1960s, a customer ordered a steak sandwich without the bun but with added fries and salad dressing. Donna Reed, Jerry's wife, made another similar version on lettuce. Hilltop Grill in Rochester, Pennsylvania also claims to be the salad's creator.

Similar to the Pittsburgh salad, the Pittsburgh-style sandwich contains meat, cheese, and fries. However, the salad is more manageable to eat and less heavy.
