= Grandma pizza =

Thin, rectangular variety of pizza

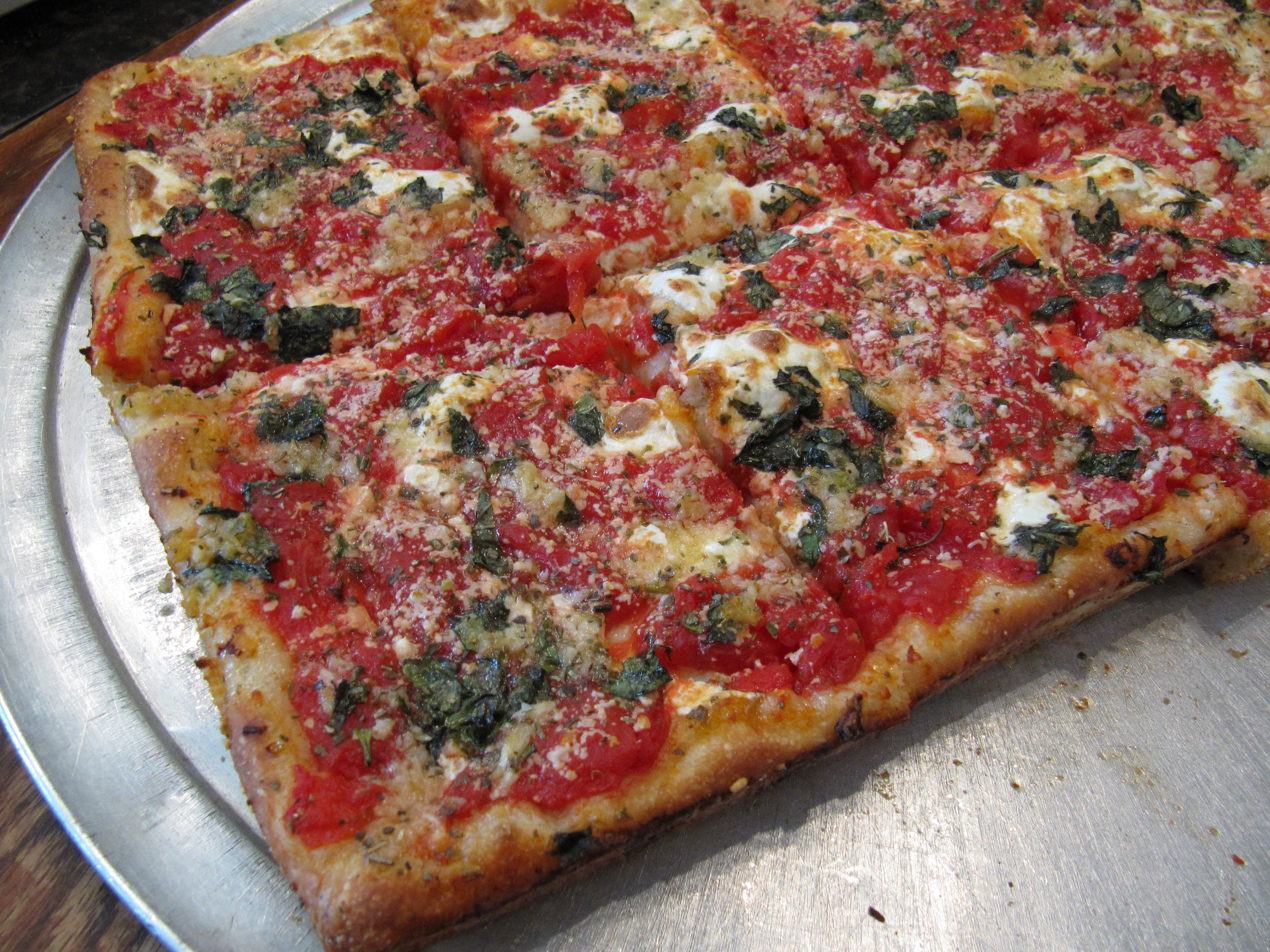
- Type: Pizza
- Place of origin: United States
- Region or state: Long Island, New York
- Main ingredients: Pizza dough, tomato sauce, cheese, tomatoes

Grandma pizza is a distinct thin, rectangular style of pizza attributed to Long Island, New York, United States. Typically topped with cheese and tomato sauce, it is reminiscent of pizzas baked at home by Italian-American housewives who lacked a pizza oven. The pizza is similar to Sicilian pizza, but usually with a thinner crust.

A grandma pizza is typically rectangular, with the cheese placed before the tomato sauce, baked in a sheet pan in a home oven, and cut into small squares.

The name refers to the home-style pizza that grandmothers made in Italy, and Long Island pizza makers are said to have begun recreating it in the 1970s. The dough gets only a short rise before it is stretched into an oiled pan, topped with cheese and then sauce, and baked at high heat. The style became popular in restaurants in the 1990s and has since spread to other parts of the United States and to Australia.

== Etymology ==
The name refers to the home-style pizza that grandmothers made in Italy. According to food writer David Rosengarten, pizza makers on Long Island possibly began making the thin, rectangular pie in the 1970s, recreating what their mothers or grandmothers had made at home. For about ten years they made it only for themselves. Rosengarten writes that accounts differ on which restaurant first served it, but credit often goes to King Umberto's in Elmont. For most of the 1990s it remained largely a Long Island product, with perhaps a few appearances in eastern Queens, before spreading more widely across New York City.

== History ==
The origins of grandma pizza can be traced back to the early 20th century when immigrants from southern Italy developed a pizza that would be made at home with simple ingredients with standard American cooking equipment (including a standard kitchen oven and sheet pan). The pie's humble roots left it dubbed "grandma pizza", since it was mainly made by first-generation immigrants in their own kitchens.

Despite having existed for generations, the term "grandma pizza" was little known outside of Long Island. Around 1994, Umberto Corteo introduced "Sicilian Grandma pizza" at his Long Island pizzerias; unlike typical thick-crusted Sicilian pizza, his Grandma Sicilian pizza had a thinner crust, though not as thin as Neapolitan. Within a few years, "Grandma pizza" began being advertised by other Long Island restaurants.

By the late 2000s and early 2010s, the name caught on and numerous pizzerias began to offer the pie.

Rosengarten visited two pizzerias on Manhattan's Upper East Side in 2013 and heard different accounts of how the pie arrived there. At Mimi's, the owner said his father had made grandma pizza for himself for years, starting about 25 years earlier, before offering it to customers occasionally about 15 years before the article. Mariella Pizza said it was the first to sell grandma pizza to the public, also about 15 years earlier. PMQ Pizza Magazine reports that the style did not become popular in restaurants until the mid- to late 1990s.

By 2013 Rosengarten described the pizza as moving west across New York City, although he found that many New Yorkers still did not know it. SBS Food reported in 2018 that it was also on menus in Melbourne and Perth. Theo Kalogeracos, who owns Theo & Co Pizzeria in Perth, first heard the name at a pizza expo in Las Vegas and added grandma pizzas to his menu in early 2016. According to PMQ Pizza Magazine, New York-based restaurateur Peter Cinelli opened Cinelli's in Cary, North Carolina, in 2005, where the style is popular, and in 2017 pizzaiolo Vincent Rotolo opened Good Pie in Las Vegas, featuring grandma-style pizza alongside other styles.

Mashed, citing Newsday, describes Umberto's of New Hyde Park, which Umberto Corteo opened in 1965, as the pizzeria commonly known as the originator of the style. In the story told there, Corteo would ask his brother Carlo to make an off-menu pizza like the one their mother had baked near Naples. It was not the family that put the pie on the menu. Two pizza makers hired in the 1980s, Ciro Cesarano and Angelo Giangrande, pushed to sell it to customers. A person named Nocella suggested the name, saying the pie reminded him more of a grandmother than a grandfather. It drew wider attention in 1989, when a fan insisted that the pizzeria bring it to a local pizza-making competition.

LongIsland.com wrote in 2019 that the style was unknown outside Long Island for a long time, even in New York City, and that readers named Umberto's more often than any other pizzeria when asked who makes the best grandma pie.

== Regional identity ==
Grandma pizza is associated with Long Island. Scott Wiener, founder of Scott's Pizza Tours in New York, says that although the pizza had been made in homes for decades, it did not take on the name until the early 1990s, when pizzerias on Long Island began selling it under that name. PMQ Pizza Magazine attributes the earliest commercially available grandma-style pizzas to Umberto's Pizzeria & Restaurant in New Hyde Park and its satellite location, King Umberto's, and says the pie was originally served only to Umberto's employees before being put on the menu in the late 1980s. Tasting Table instead dates its first appearances on Long Island menus to the late 1970s or early 1980s, also crediting Umberto's as one of the first to offer it, and notes that although the style spread across New York City, it has not matched the commercial popularity of the traditional New York slice.

Although once thought to be unique to Long Island and the New York metropolitan area, the style has since been exported to other parts of the United States, including Florida and California. Examples include Cinelli's in Cary, North Carolina, opened in 2005 by New York-based restaurateur Peter Cinelli, where the style is popular, and Good Pie in Las Vegas, opened in 2017 by Vincent Rotolo. Wiener says nothing ties the pizza to one region, and suggests that similar pizzas are likely made in bakeries and homes in many Italian communities.

== Variations ==
Grandma pizza is often compared with Sicilian pizza. The main difference lies in how long the dough rests after it is stretched into the pan: Sicilian dough is left to rise further, giving a thicker, bread-like crust, while grandma dough is baked after a short rest, giving a thinner, crisper crust. Pizza maker Theo Kalogeracos says that some Italian-American pizza makers in New York refrigerate the dough for about 24 hours, which gives it more structure to support additional toppings.

The cheese is usually applied before the sauce, but the order is not fixed. The Kitchn describes Sicilian pizza as bready and similar to focaccia, in contrast to the thin, crisp crust of grandma pizza. Theo & Co sells a version called the "Upside Down Granny", which Kalogeracos said follows the way many New York pizzerias make it, with mozzarella on the dough and a rich tomato sauce on top. Other pies on the same menu use toppings such as prosciutto, rocket and parmesan, or cherry tomatoes and basil added after baking. SBS Food also notes that grandma pizza is very similar to Detroit-style pizza.

At one Long Island pizzeria, readers recommended a version made with vodka sauce, which some call the "Drunken Grandma" pie.

== Characteristics ==
Grandma pizza is a thin-crusted pizza baked in a square or rectangular pan coated with olive oil, traditionally in a home oven rather than directly on the surface of a professional pizza oven. It is cut into square or rectangular pieces rather than triangular slices. Compared with a New York slice, both have crisp bottoms, but a grandma slice is denser.

The crust is thinner than that of Sicilian pizza. King Arthur Baking gives the typical thickness of grandma pizza as about 0.75 inches (1.9 cm), compared with about 1 inch (2.5 cm) for Sicilian pizza. According to PMQ Pizza Magazine, the dough is typically proofed for no more than about 40 minutes, if at all, and less dough is used than for a Sicilian pie.

=== Crust ===
The olive oil used to coat the pan is considered key to the crust's crispness. Pizzerias often bake grandma pizza in heavy steel pans, which brown the dough more evenly. King Arthur Baking recommends a dark pan for a crisp bottom and edges, noting that a lighter pan produces a softer crust.

=== Sauce and cheese ===
According to PMQ Pizza Magazine, other characteristics of the style include sauce placed on top of the cheese, generous use of garlic in the sauce and sparsely placed dollops of fresh mozzarella.

The sauce differs between pizzerias. King Arthur Baking's version combines crushed canned tomatoes with olive oil, garlic and Italian herbs, while at Mimi's, a pizzeria on Manhattan's Upper East Side, the sauce was a short-cooked, chunky marinara rather than the long-cooked sauce of a regular pie.

== Preparation ==
Grandma pizza is made from a yeast dough of flour, water, salt, yeast and olive oil, which can be kneaded by hand, in a mixer or in a bread machine. The dough is stretched directly in the pan, and the square or rectangular shape allows ordinary kitchen trays to be used.

=== Dough ===
The dough usually gets a short first rise. Kalogeracos said that a traditional home dough would be ready in two to four hours. SBS Food publishes a recipe that uses the dough after a single one-hour rise, or allows it to be refrigerated for up to 24 hours beforehand, while King Arthur Baking's recipe has the dough chilled for four to 24 hours. At Mimi's, Rosengarten was told that a grandma pie uses about two-thirds as much dough as a Sicilian pie baked in the same pan.

=== Pan and assembly ===
The dough is stretched into a pan coated with a generous amount of olive oil. King Arthur Baking's recipe calls for two tablespoons (25 g) of oil in a grandma-style pizza pan or an 18 by 13 inches (46 by 33 cm) baking sheet, and advises gently deflating the dough as it is stretched to the edges and corners of the pan. If the dough shrinks back, it suggests covering it and resting it for ten minutes before continuing. The second rise is very brief and is intended only to let the dough relax so that it does not turn thick; King Arthur Baking's recipe rests the dough in the pan for about 30 minutes, until slightly puffed.

According to The Kitchn, the oiled dough and the layer of cheese keep the crust from becoming soggy, and the sauce is dotted over the top. SBS Food advises spreading the cheese out to the edges of the pan so that the edges of the crust turn crisp, and not covering the whole pizza in sauce. Practices differ between pizzerias: at Mariella Pizza, the dough is brushed with oil and garlic before the tomatoes and cheese go on, the sauce is applied in only one or two dabs per slice, and fresh basil is added on top, while the shop's owner said other pizzerias use oregano instead.

=== Baking and serving ===
King Arthur Baking's recipe bakes the pizza on a rack in the bottom third of an oven preheated to 500 °F (260 °C), for 12 to 15 minutes, until the cheese is bubbly and the crust is golden. It advises letting the pizza cool for five to ten minutes before serving, and reheating leftover slices in a 325 °F (165 °C) oven for five to ten minutes.
