= Crawfish pie =

Louisiana dish

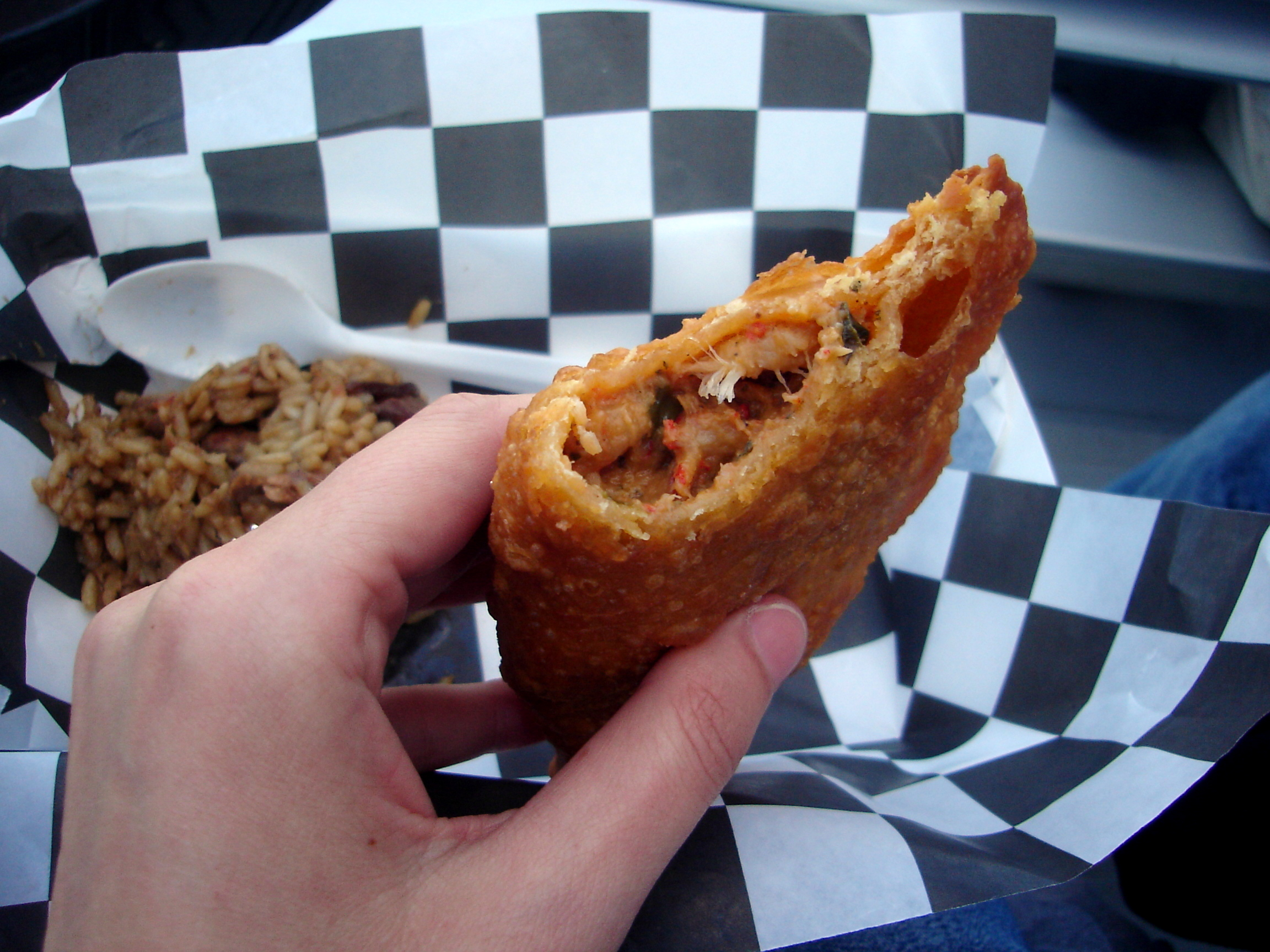
- Crawfish pie and jambalaya at Père Antoine in New Orleans (2007)
- Type: Savoury pie
- Place of origin: United States
- Region or state: Louisiana
- Main ingredients: Crawfish

Crawfish pie is a type of baked savory pie common in the Cajun and Creole cuisine of Louisiana. It is similar in appearance to a pot pie and contains crawfish. The dish is typically served as a hand pie but it can also be made into larger 9-inch pies.

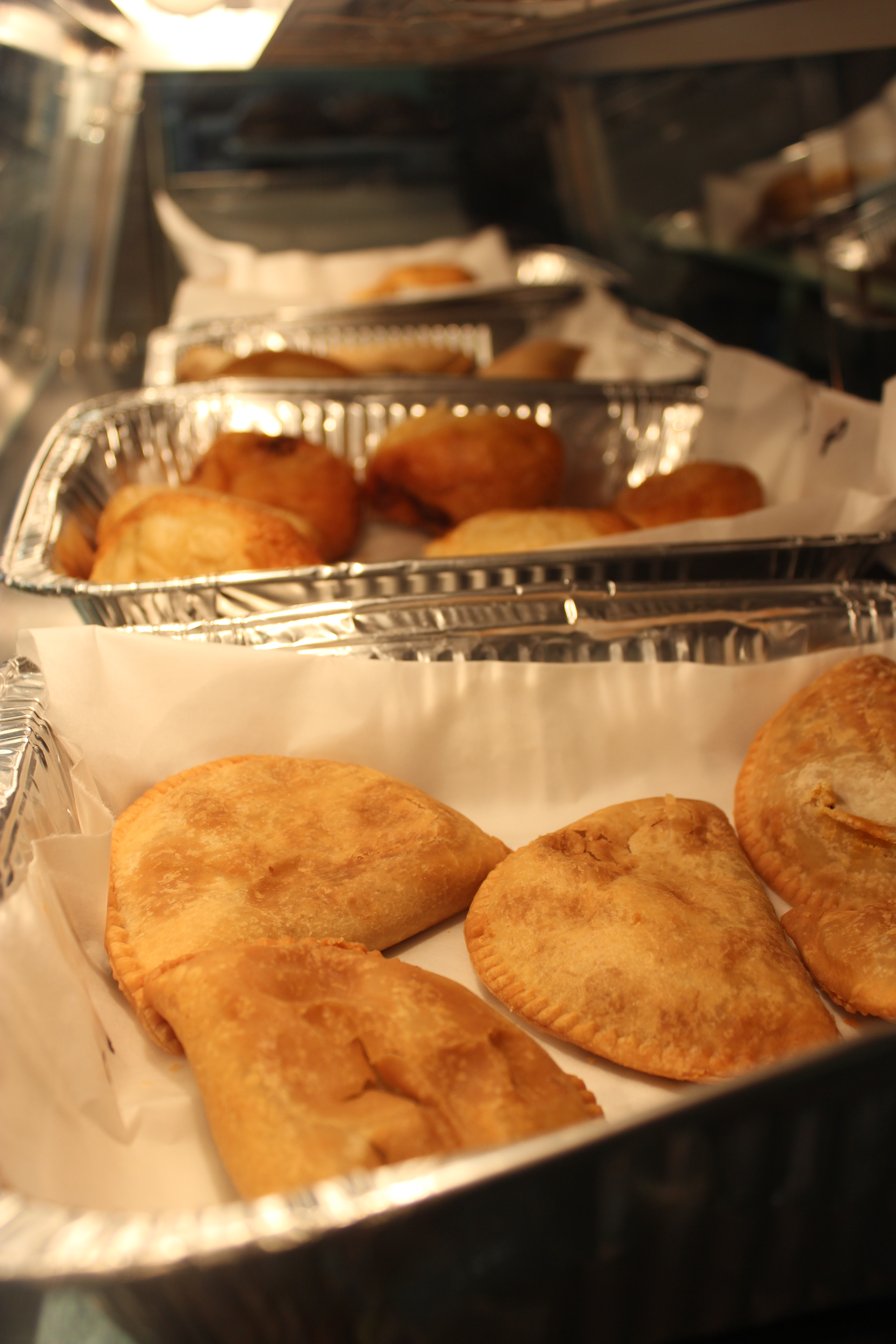
Crawfish pies at Bergeron's

== Preparation ==
Crawfish pie is prepared by making a roux with bell peppers, onions and celery, the "holy trinity" of Cajun cooking. Seafood stock and cooked crawfish tails are then added to the roux before it is poured into a pie crust. Spices and aromatics, including possibly garlic, black pepper, paprika and parsley, are also included in the roux.

== In popular culture ==
The dish is mentioned in the Hank Williams song "Jambalaya (On the Bayou)", along with other common Cajun dishes such as jambalaya and gumbo.

== See also ==
- Étouffée
- List of seafood dishes
- Natchitoches meat pie
