= Bartini (Portland, Oregon) =

Bar in the United States

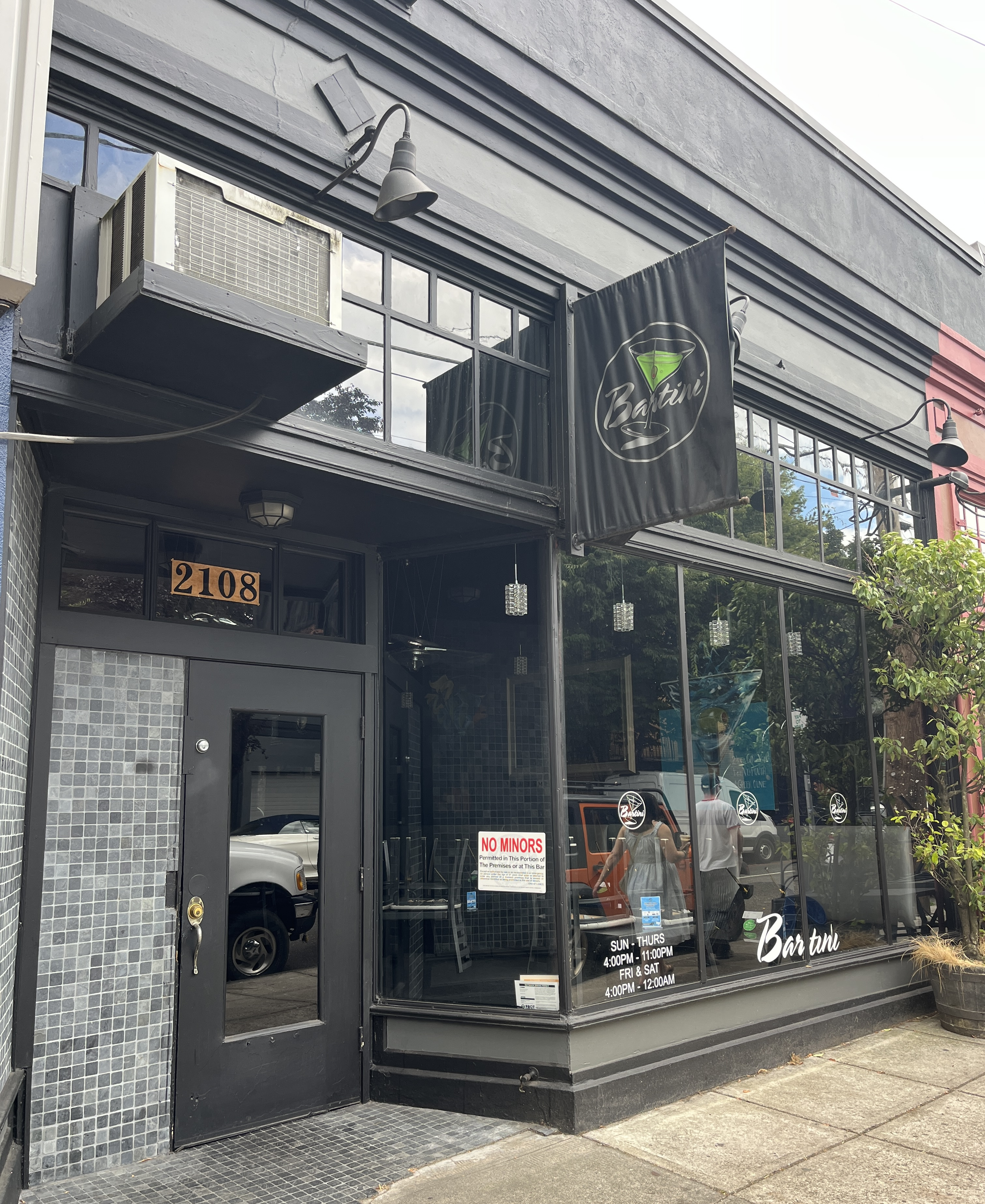
- The bar's exterior in 2025
- Interactive map of Bartini

Restaurant information
- Established: 2003
- Owner: Urban Restaurant Group
- Location: 2108 Northwest Glisan Street, Portland, Multnomah, Oregon, 97210, United States
- Coordinates: 45.5262°N 122.6947°W
- Website: bartinipdx.com

Bartini was a bar in Portland, Oregon, United States. Established in 2003 and owned by Urban Restaurant Group, the bar operated in northwest Portland's Northwest District. Bartini closed permanently in February 2026.

== Description ==
Bartini operated in northwest Portland's Northwest District. The interior had chandeliers, paintings of goldfish in martini glasses, white booths, and a wall of mirrors. The bar served approximately 100 martini varieties. Among drinks was the French Kiss Martini, which had champagne, puréed strawberries, and vodka, and the Herbal Remedy, which had Belvedere vodka, yellow Chartreuse, green tea, lemon, Prosecco, and star anise. Others were Blackberry Lemon Drop, the Mojitotini, the Thin Mint Cookie martini, and the Zesty Cucumber. The food menu included small plates such as a cheeseburger, gorgonzola-brie fondue, chips and guacamole, corn dogs, and mashed potatoes.

== History ==
Bartini opened in 2003. It was operated by Urban Restaurant Group, which has also owned Brix Tavern, Carlita's, Fuller's Coffee Shop, and Swank and Swine. Bartini was described as the "sibling lounge" of Urban Fondue. The general manager of Bartini and Urban Fondue died in 2024. Both businesses closed permanently in February 2026.

== Reception ==
Bartini received honorable mention and ranked third in the Best Happy Hour category of Willamette Week's annual Best of Portland readers' poll in 2015 and 2017, respectively.
