= Fuller's Coffee Shop =

Diner in Portland, Oregon, U.S.

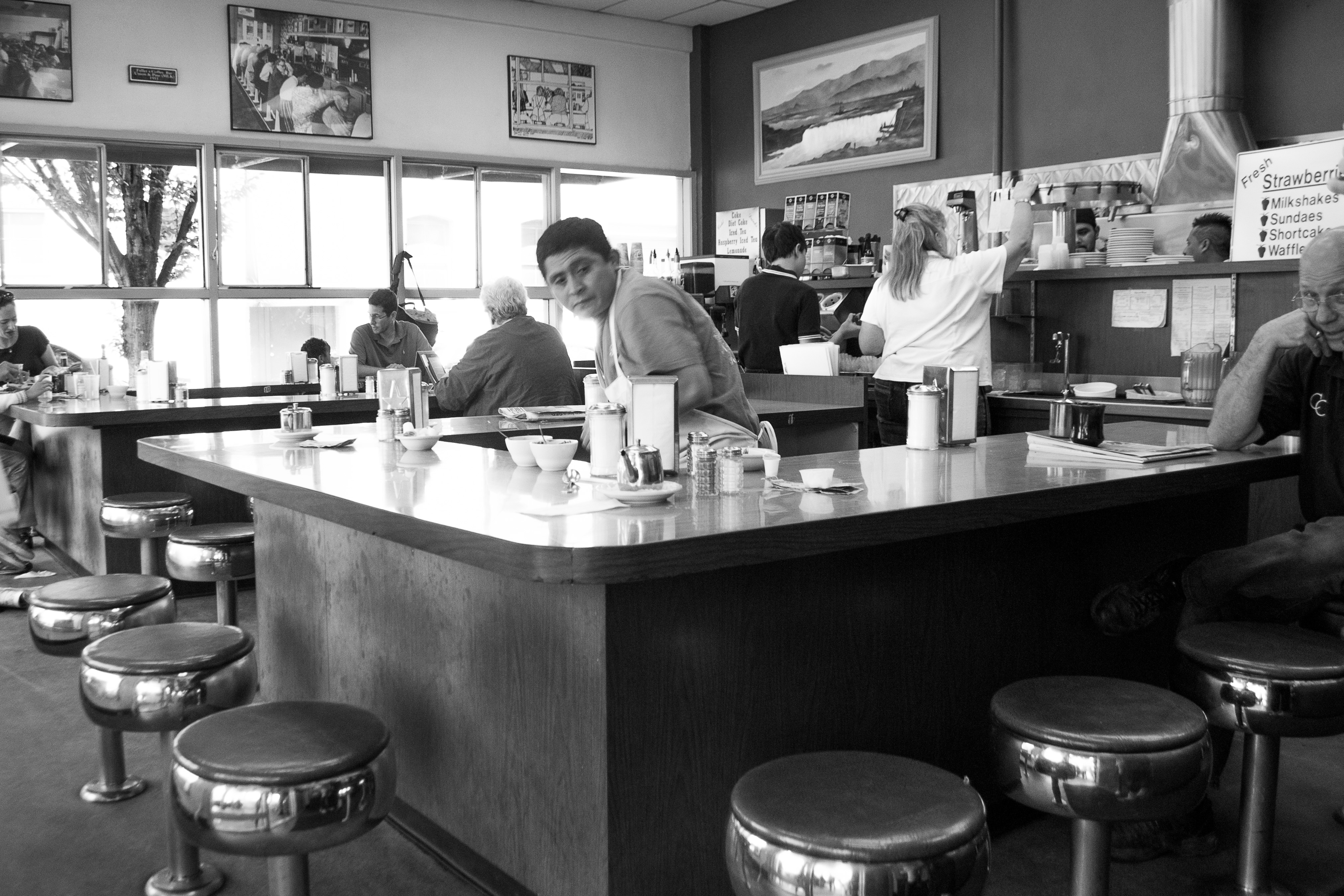
- The diner's interior in 2013
- Interactive map of Fuller's Coffee Shop

Restaurant information
- Established: 1947; 79 years ago
- Owner: Urban Restaurant Group
- Previous owners: Jack Fuller; John Fuller
- Food type: American
- Location: 136 Northwest 9th Avenue, Portland, Multnomah, Oregon, 97209, United States
- Coordinates: 45.5243°N 122.6798°W
- Website: fullerscoffeeshop.com

Fuller's Coffee Shop is a diner serving standard American cuisine in Portland, Oregon's Pearl District, in the United States. Established in 1947, the restaurant has operated from its location in downtown Portland since 1960. It serves breakfast all day, and the menu features a cheeseburger with a recipe that has not changed since the diner's establishment. Described as a greasy spoon, Fuller's has received a generally positive reception, and appeared in an episode of the television series Grimm in 2017. Founded by Jack Fuller, the diner was later owned by his son John then by Urban Restaurant Group.

== Description ==
Fuller's Coffee Shop is a diner serving American cuisine at the intersection of 9th Avenue and Davis Street in northwest Portland's Pearl District. The restaurant has a "meandering" M-shaped Formica counter with "classic" swiveling chrome stools and linoleum floors, a neon clock, plain silverware, and paper napkins. Thrillist called Fuller's a "surprisingly blue-collar counter operation" with "friendly, mostly older" staff.

Willamette Week said the "always-packed" greasy spoon's "old-timey charm comes from a combination of its zigzagging lunch-counter setup, the endearingly labyrinthine menu and its incredible lowball prices". Portland Mercury's Megan Burbank said that Fuller's is "one of those ageless, no-frills diners that seem to have been transported from the East Coast, legit diner counter and perfect comfort-food menu intact". Julie Lee of 1859 called the diner an "old-school counter service haunt, specializing in gigantic omelets and food you don't want to make at home when it's hot out". Oregon ArtsWatch's Bob Hicks described Fuller's as a "genuine old-line breakfast-and-lunch diner with a hustle-bustle attitude and a brisk zigzag of counter stools".

=== Menu ===
The diner serves breakfast all day. The menu includes chili burgers, corned beef hash, chicken fried steak, pigs in a blanket, French toast, eggs and omelets, fried razor clams, hash browns, bacon, cinnamon rolls, and toast made from homemade bread. The breakfast special is a pancake, an egg, and two pieces of bacon. Sandwich options include cheese, egg salad, French dip, ham, and Monte Cristo.

The lunch menu also has beef and mashed potatoes with gravy, sloppy Joes, salmon steaks, fish and chips, fried oysters, French fries, and coleslaw. The restaurant's cheeseburger has been described as a menu "fixture", with a recipe unchanged since 1947. According to an employee, the "secret" ingredients in the burger's sauce include mayonnaise, ketchup, cayenne, curry powder, and white pepper, along with three additional "exotic" spices. The cheeseburger, two thin patties between sesame seed buns, served with lettuce, pickles, American cheese, became the "star attraction and raison d'etre" of Fuller's Burger Shack, a sister restaurant operated by a local restaurant group.

== History ==
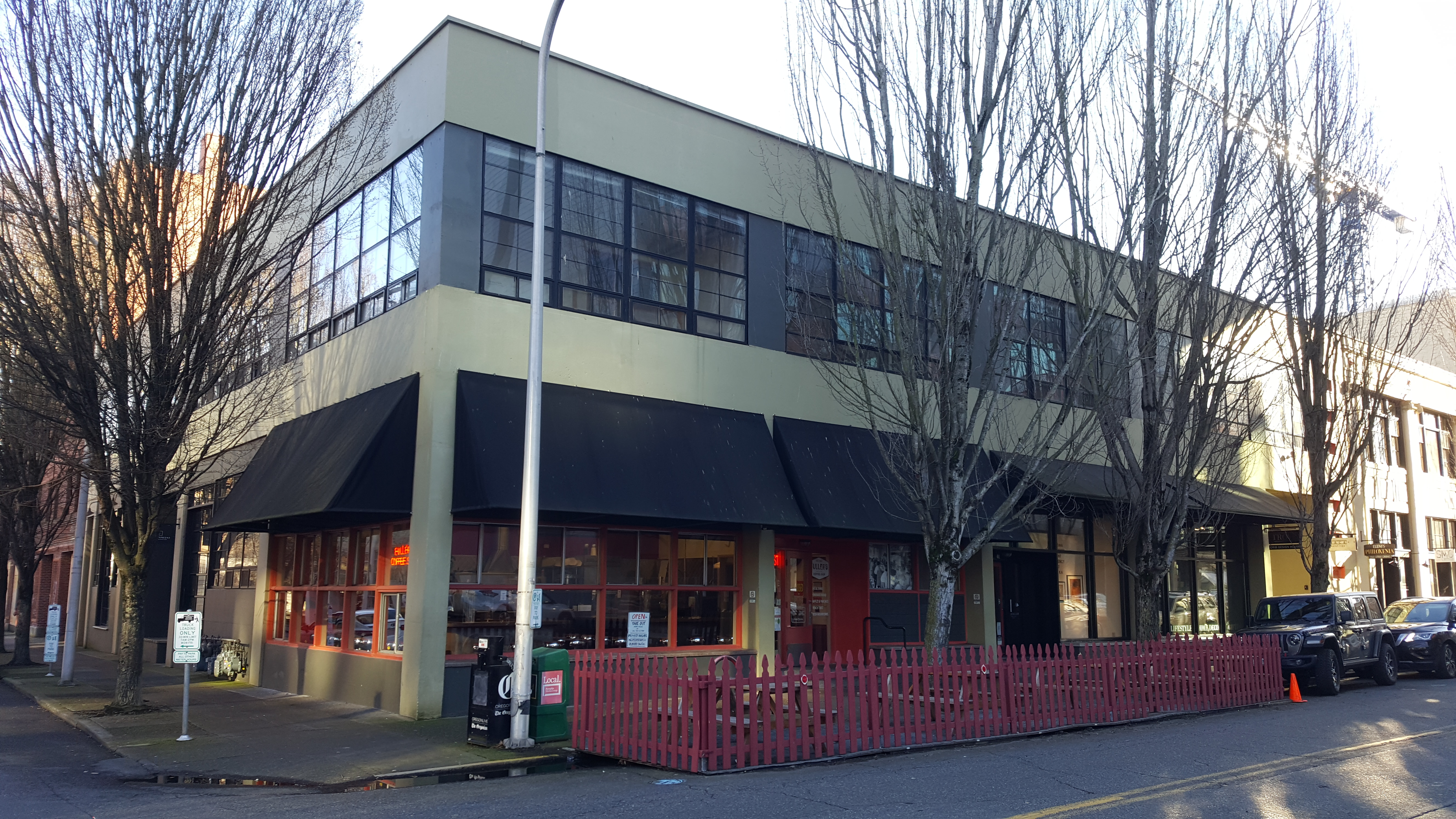
The restaurant's exterior and outdoor seating in January 2021, during the COVID-19 pandemic

Fuller's opened in northeast Portland in 1947. It was named after its founder, Jack Fuller. The diner relocated to its current location in the Pearl District in 1960. In 1979, the diner was passed down to John Fuller, the founder's son.

In 2017, Fuller's appeared in "The Seven Year Itch", the fifth episode of the sixth season of the American drama television series Grimm. Fuller's was acquired by the Urban Restaurant Group, a local enterprise that also owns Brix Tavern, Swank and Swine, and several other establishments in Portland, in 2019.

During the COVID-19 pandemic, Fuller's offered takeout service. In February 2023, a fire forced the restaurant to close temporarily for repairs. The business had hoped to reopen in June 2023, then October 2023; it ultimately opened on November 8, 2023.

== Reception ==
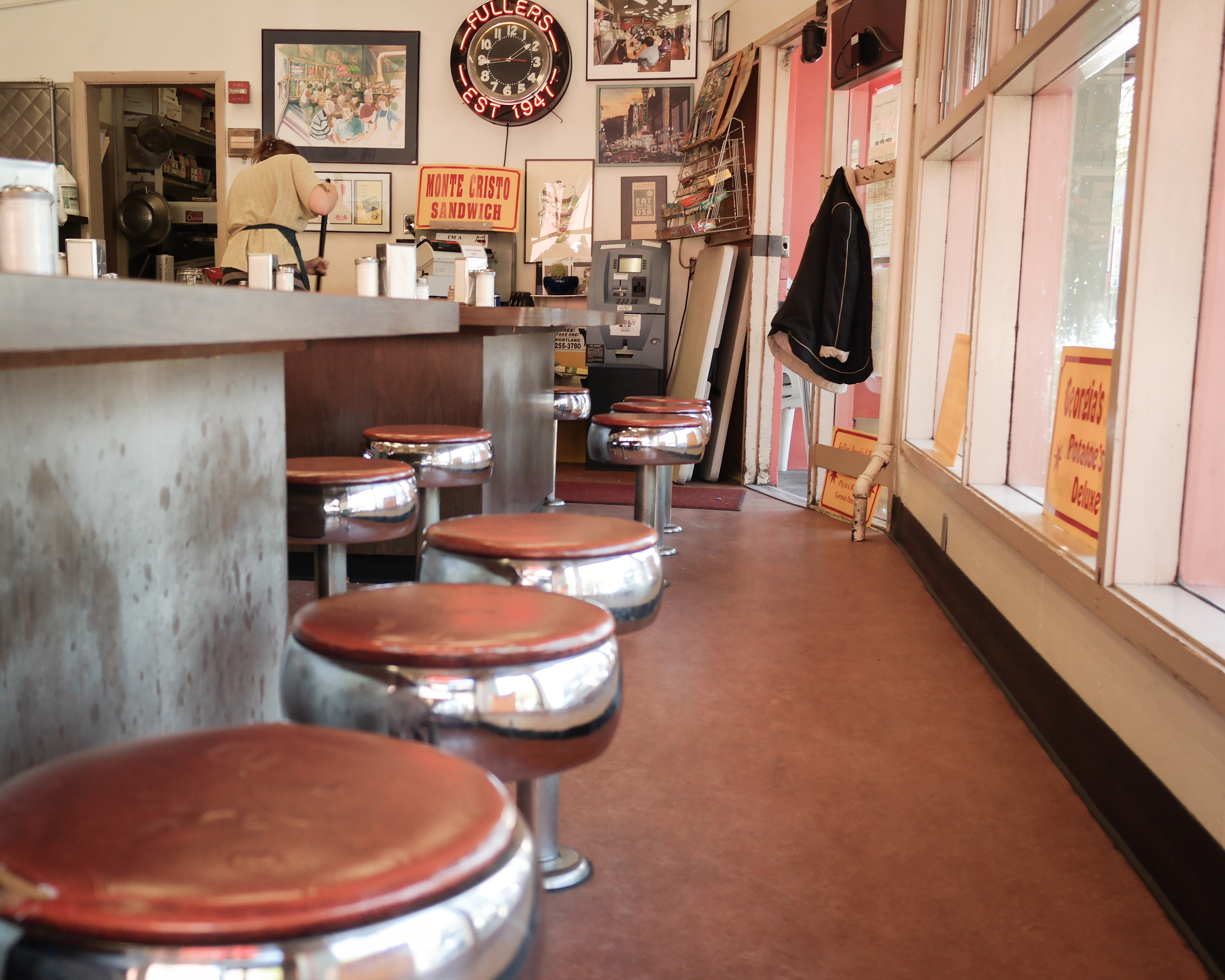
Counter and interior decor, 2014

For Roadfood, Jane and Michael Stern rated the diner 4.5 out of 5 stars and wrote, "Off the tourist path but loved by locals, Fuller's is not only prime Portland; it is a taste of the sort of high-quality urban hash house now nearly vanished from most American cities." In 2016, Willamette Week recommended the breakfast special and said, "Take one step in Fuller's, and you'll feel like you're back in 1947". The newspaper's Walker MacMurdo wrote, "You'll be hard-pressed to find a breakfast this big and this good at this price anywhere else on the westside, let alone in the rest of the city. In an area that has developed into a jungle of Chipotle-wave décor, millennial apartment complexes and elite boutiques, Fuller's remains a deservedly popular bastion of a bygone time when elderly men in overalls could enjoy a glass of milk with their omelet." Portland Mercury's Megan Burbank wrote in 2017:

If you want to spend brunch feeling like you're inside an Edward Hopper painting, you can't do better. And if, like me, your Waterloo of breakfast is deciding between savory and sweet, go for the breakfast special ... it has it all! ... There are tables outside, but the gem of Fuller's is its counter, which brings a sense of remarkable efficiency to the whole operation, and makes an especially good spot for solo brunching alongside loyal regulars and slumming Pearl District yuccies alike. In other words, it's perfect.

The Oregonian's Michael Russell has described the cheeseburger as "what a McDonald's burger might still look like if the global corporation hadn't been worrying about shareholders for the past five decades". He included Fuller's in his 2018–2020 overviews of the city's "best inexpensive restaurants". Russell called Fuller's "the best of Portland's classic diners", and also included the diner in his 2019 guide to the city's best brunches. Lizzy Acker and Russell ranked Fuller's number 21 in a 2019 list of the city's best corned beef hashes, and said, "The food is good, the prices are hard to beat, but it's the old-school ambiance and friendly (but not overly friendly) service that keep us coming back to Fuller's."

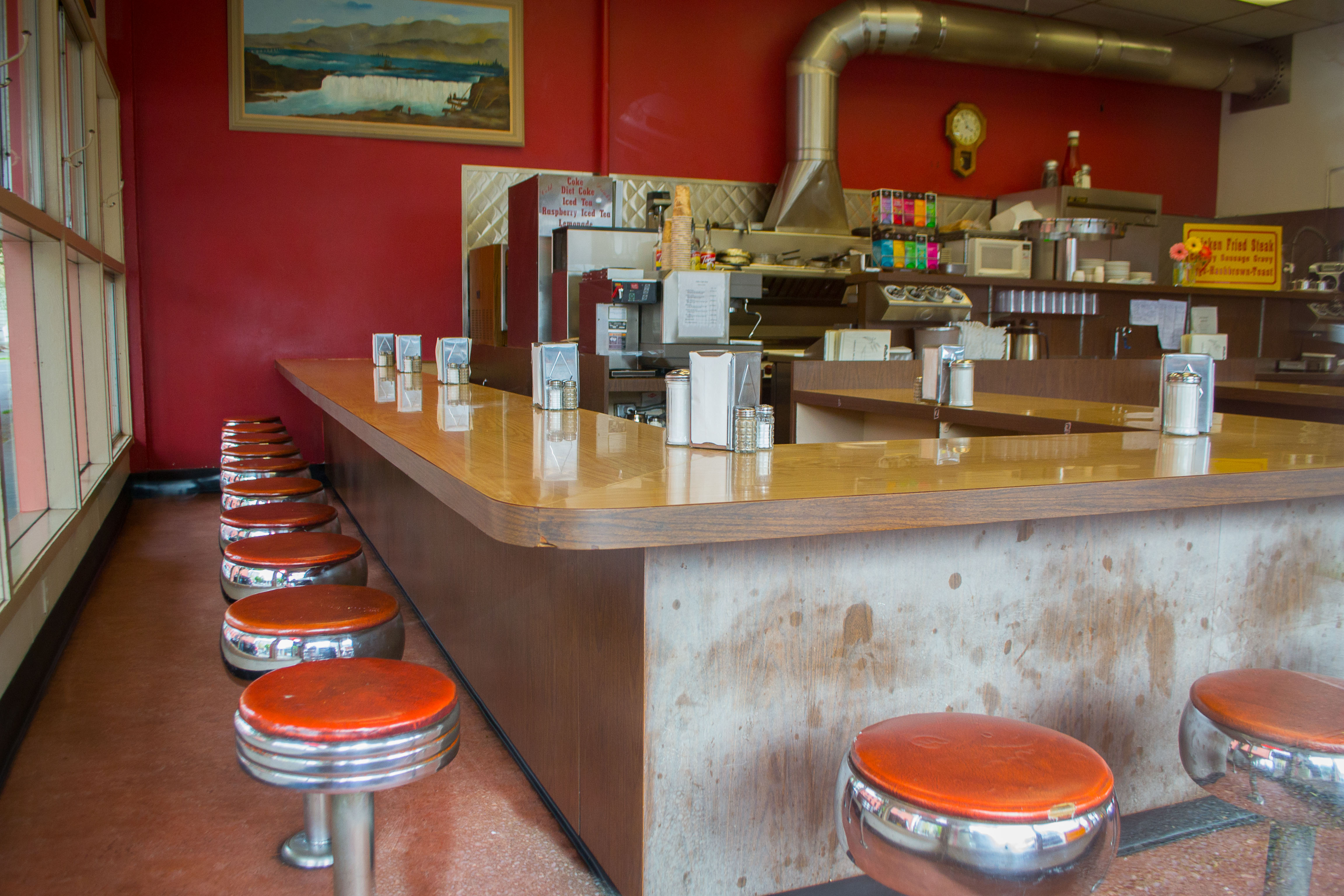
Unoccupied interior, 2013

In 2018, Food & Wine's David Landsel also said that the diner appears "out of a Hopper painting" and called the omelettes "pretty great". His 2020 overview of the nation's best diners described Fuller's as an "alluring corner joint where each seat in the restaurant is a counter seat, backed by giant windows that even on the darkest days, lend Portland's finest no-nonsense diner an abundance of natural light. Classic it may be, but there's a distinctive creativity to the menu here, nearly essential in a town where breakfast and brunch are essentially a new kind of religion". Landsel recommended that diners "try the indulgent Monte Cristo sandwich, or simply appreciate just how good a plate of bacon, eggs, and potatoes can be, when someone back behind the counter gives a damn about quality. Other breakfasts may be more famous, but let them wait for another day—at Fuller's, chances are you won't feel like you're missing out, at all."

Eater Portland's Erin DeJesus included Fuller's in her 2013 list of the twelve "best restaurants for dining solo" in the city, in which she said that the diner "maintains that old-school, every-man-for-himself vibe" and recommended a visit "for morning/lunchtime solo diners (or those who bury themselves in the newspaper when eating alone)". In a 2016 list of "Portland's 12 Iconic Greasy Spoon Breakfasts", the website said, "Fuller's isn't old-fashioned; it's just old... The food is so basic you really could cook it at home, but the ambience and shared conversation around the counter makes you glad something so old has survived in this part of town." For Eater Portland's 2020 list of "17 Old-School Restaurants Every Portlander Must Try", Heather Arndt Anderson and Krista Garcia described Fuller's as a "Pearl District holdout" with "a lunch counter in the true sense of the word". In 2019, Bob Hicks of Oregon ArtsWatch described Fuller's as a "pillar of a rapidly changing community" and wrote, "to the city's developers and speculators I have just three words: Hands off, dammit."

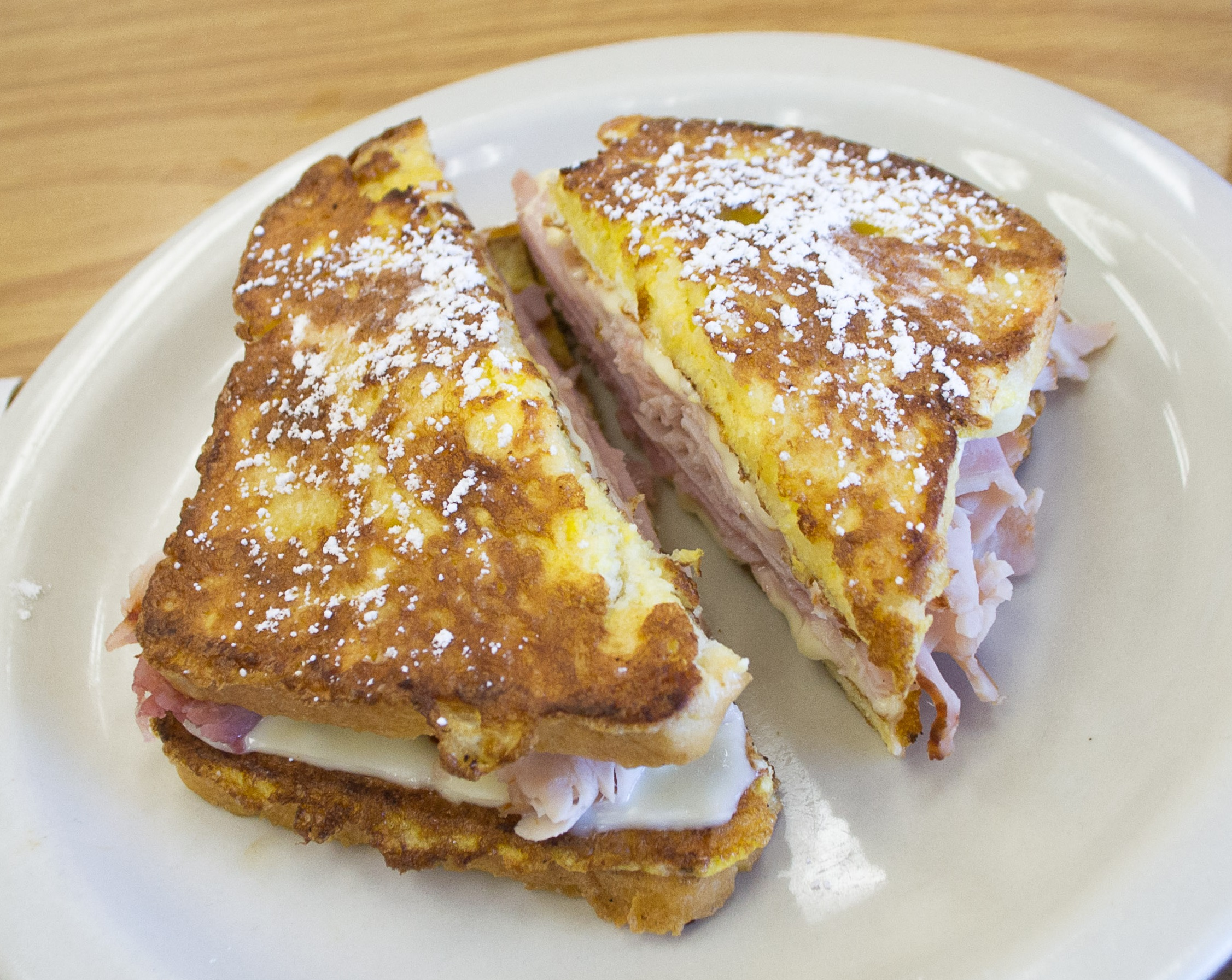
The diner's Monte Cristo sandwich

During the COVID-19 pandemic, Eater Portland published a list of "real-deal" and "essential breakfasts that hold their own for takeout and delivery", in which Kara Stokes and Brooke Jackson-Glidden identified select takeout options and said of the diner, "When breakfast calls for no more than greasy spoon simplicity and endless coffee refills, there's nothing like Fuller's". The website later included Fuller's in a 2025 overview of the best bars and restaurants in the Pearl District. Fuller's Burger Shack's entrée ranked number seven in Portland Monthly's 2020 list of the city's 20 best cheeseburgers; comparing the cheeseburger to the version served at Fuller's Coffee Shop, writers for the magazine said that "the Burger Shack version is a hair better than the coffee shop original. What we loved: the warm creaminess, the perfect proportions, the luscious char, the splendid crunch of whole iceberg leaves, the way the cheese pooled over the edges". Thrillist said that the diner feels "like something you'd find on the way out of town, not a couple minutes from what people don't actually call Portland's financial district (even though it's true). The food is cheap but delicious. It's not trying to be anything other than a place for properly cooked eggs, crispy hash browns, and a seemingly never-ending cup of hot coffee." Fodor's Inside Portland (2020) described Fuller's as a "reliably good greasy spoon" with an "endearing" neon sign.

== See also ==
- List of diners
