= Brix Tavern =

Restaurant in Portland, Oregon, U.S.

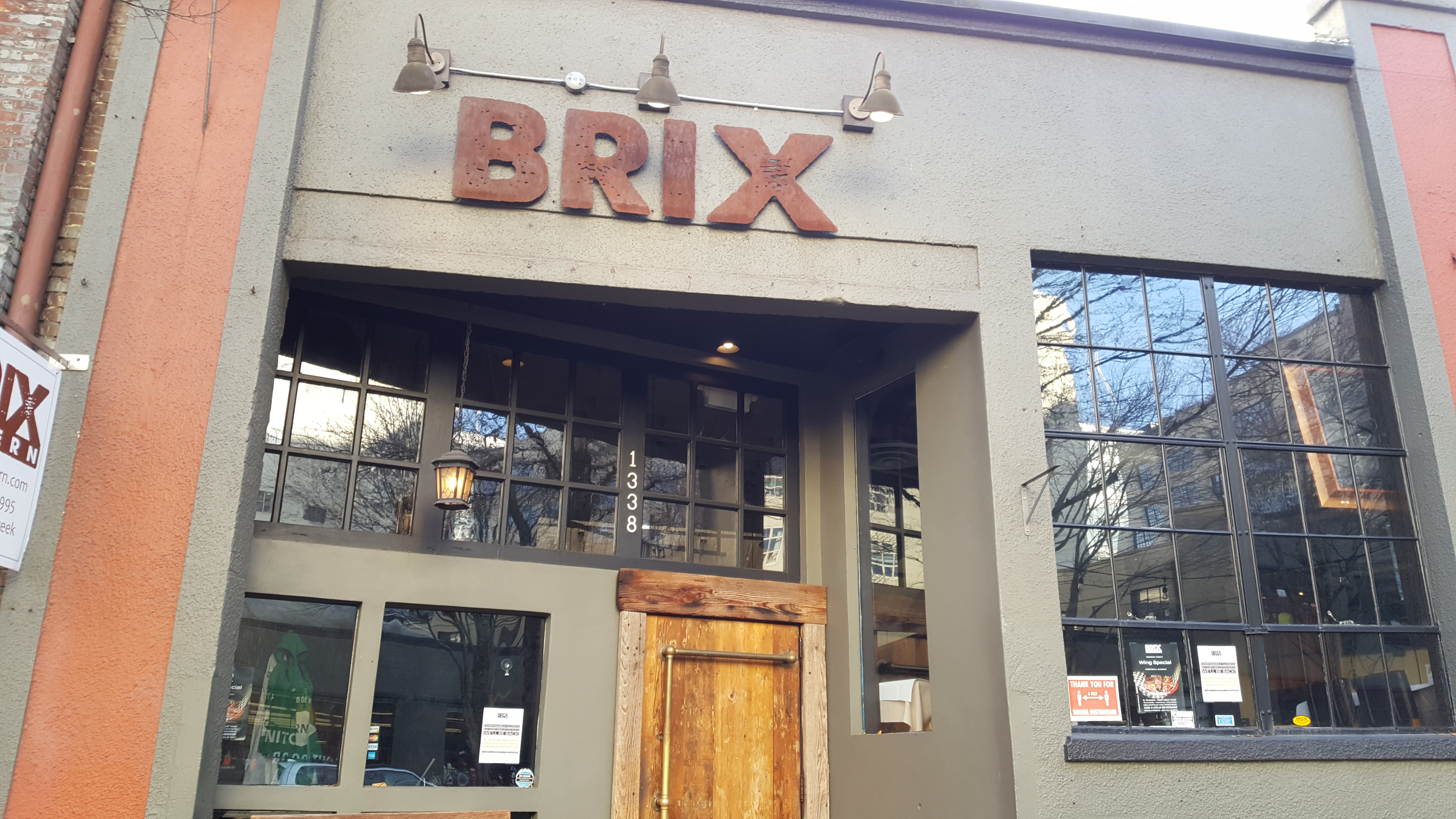
- The restaurant's exterior in 2020
- Interactive map of Brix Tavern

Restaurant information
- Established: April 22, 2011
- Owner: Urban Restaurant Group
- Food type: American; New American
- Location: 1338 Northwest Hoyt Street, Portland, Multnomah, Oregon, 97209
- Coordinates: 45.527087°N 122.684856°W
- Seating capacity: 150 (Portland)
- Other locations: Hillsboro; Keizer (defunct); Tualatin
- Website: brixtavern.com

Brix Tavern is a small chain of restaurants in the Portland metropolitan area, in the U.S. state of Oregon. The flagship restaurant operates in northwest Portland's Pearl District and additional locations are in Hillsboro and Tualatin. Previously, the business also operated in Keizer.

The 150-seat restaurant in Portland was opened by Urban Restaurant Group in April 2011 and offers American cuisine such as wood-fired pizzas, rotisserie meats, and other comfort foods. The restaurant has hosted and participated in special events, and has received a generally positive reception; compliments are most often given for happy hour menu options.

== Description ==
Brix Tavern is a small chain of restaurants serving American cuisine in the Portland metropolitan area. The 150-seat flagship restaurant operates in northwest Portland's Pearl District. There are also locations in Hillsboro's Reeds Crossing neighborhood and in Tualatin's Tualatin Commons. The Hillsboro location has a wrap-around patio and a private room for events. Previously, the business also operated a shopping plaza in Keizer called Keizer Station.

According to Portland Monthly, Brix is a New American restaurant and the Pearl District's "game-time go-to" with 30 craft beers on tap, 20 television sets, a billiard table, two dart boards, and a happy hour menu available for six hours each day. Erin DeJesus of Eater Portland classified Brix as a lounge and sports bar. Snooker was available for free, as of 2015.

=== Menu ===
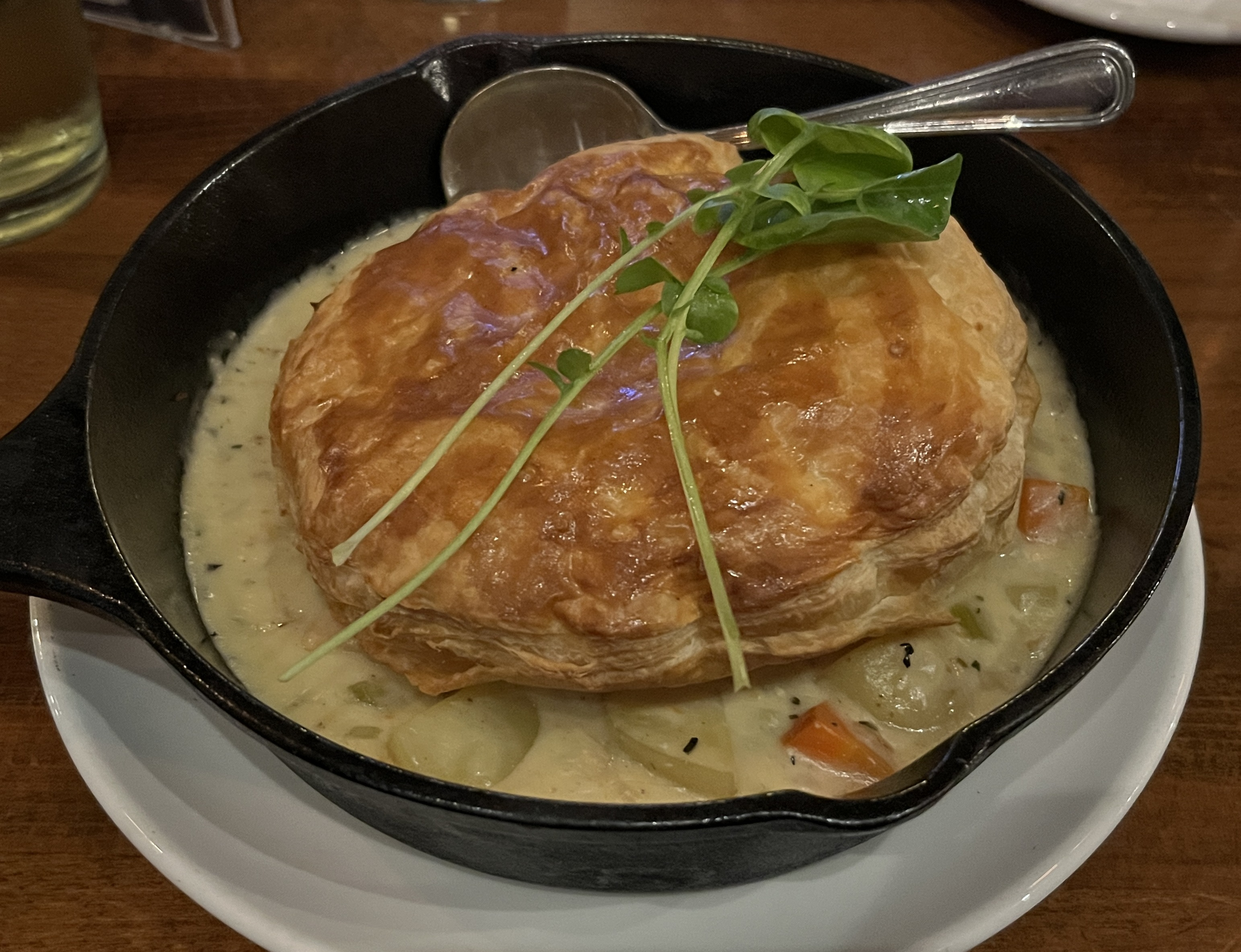
Pot pie with chicken, 2024

One restaurant guide has described Brix Tavern as a "warm, contemporary" restaurant and bar serving "a unique collection of enduring American comfort food and cocktails enhanced with only the freshest, locally sourced ingredients". The menu focuses on wood-fired pizzas and rotisserie meats but has offered options including whole chicken or grilled beef platters with four sauces (including béarnaise), prime rib, fried chicken, roasted halibut, sandwiches, soups, salads, and truffled macaroni and cheese. The brunch menu, which is available at weekends, offers a "slight Southern twist" and includes chicken and waffles, biscuits and gravy with maple sausage, eggs Benedict, shrimp and grits, mimosas, and complimentary cinnamon sugar doughnuts drizzled with chocolate and raspberry.

The dessert menu has included a Heath bar brownie, crème brûlée, and a blackberry buttermilk pie. The happy hour menu included calamari, pizza Margherita, and seared yellowfin tuna with avocado, corn, tomato, and wasabi mayonnaise, as well as the "kicky" Brix Mule with bourbon or vodka, as of 2019. Other drinks on the happy hour menu have included the Huckleberry Gimlet with huckleberry vodka and blackberry syrup, the Backyard Margarita with muddled Oregon berries, and the Red Neck Iced Tea with bourbon whiskey.

In 2013, David Sarasohn of The Oregonian said, "Brix finds other ways to keep the happiness flowing outside designated hours, too. On Thursdays it offers a three-course meal plus cocktail for $30, and every night features a surprise $3 brown bag canned beer special." The Portland restaurant offered half-priced bottles of wine on Thursdays, as of 2016.

== History ==
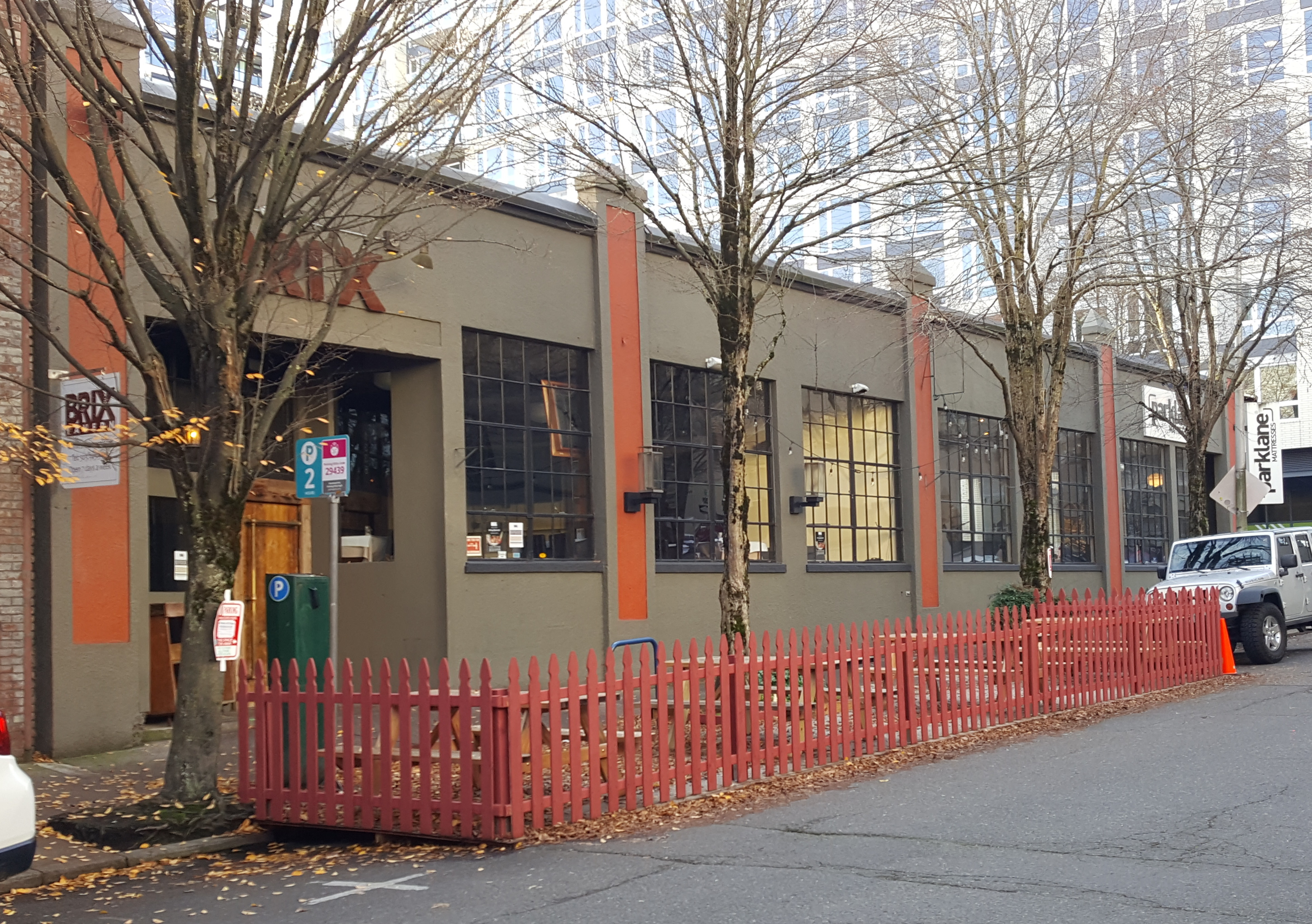
The flagship restaurant's exterior with a designated outdoor seating area during the COVID-19 pandemic, 2020

The original Brix Tavern opened on April 22, 2011, in a space that was previously occupied by an Italian-Mediterranean restaurant called Olea. Urban Restaurants, Inc. had applied for Brix Tavern's liquor license by November 2010. Other restaurants within Urban Restaurant Group include Bartini, Carlita's, Swank and Swine, and Urban Fondue as of 2017. In 2018, Brix Tavern was featured on "Winner Winner Free Dinner", the second episode of the first season of the Food Network's television show Big Bargain Eats.

Brix's second location opened in Tualatin, in the space that previously housed Hayden's Lakefront Grill. Staff at Hayden's were invited to work at Brix. A third location opened in Keizer, in the space that previously housed Bargarten Bavarian Social Haus, in 2023. The Keizer location has since closed. Brix's Hillsboro location opened on June 26, 2026.

=== Events ===
Brix Tavern has hosted and participated in a variety of special events. In 2016, the restaurant hosted a "Beer – Barbecue – Bourbon Buffet" featuring a barbecue, beers by Ninkasi, and bourbon whiskey by Elijah Craig. The 2017 "Whiskey Wash" event invited local distilleries to pair whiskeys with the venue's sweet-bourbon rotisserie pork leg. For Thanksgiving in 2017, the restaurant served a four-course dinner with roast turkey.

Brix has participated in Portland Mercury's highball cocktails event, Burger Week, and Nacho Week events. For Burger Week in 2017 and 2019, Brix offered a burger called "The Norm" with sirloin steak, smoked Tillamook cheddar fondue, shredded lettuce, tomatoes, caramelized onions, and sauce for five dollars. For Nacho Week in 2019, Brix offered the "Brix Chips" with braised roasted pork shoulder, Swiss cheese fondue, grilled tomato salsa, cilantro cream, and tortilla chips, for five dollars as well. For a Super Bowl viewing party in 2020, Brix served buffalo wings, barbecue pork ribs, mini corn dogs, "lil smokies", mozzarella sticks, tater tots, and nachos in the form of chips and tater tots.

== Reception ==
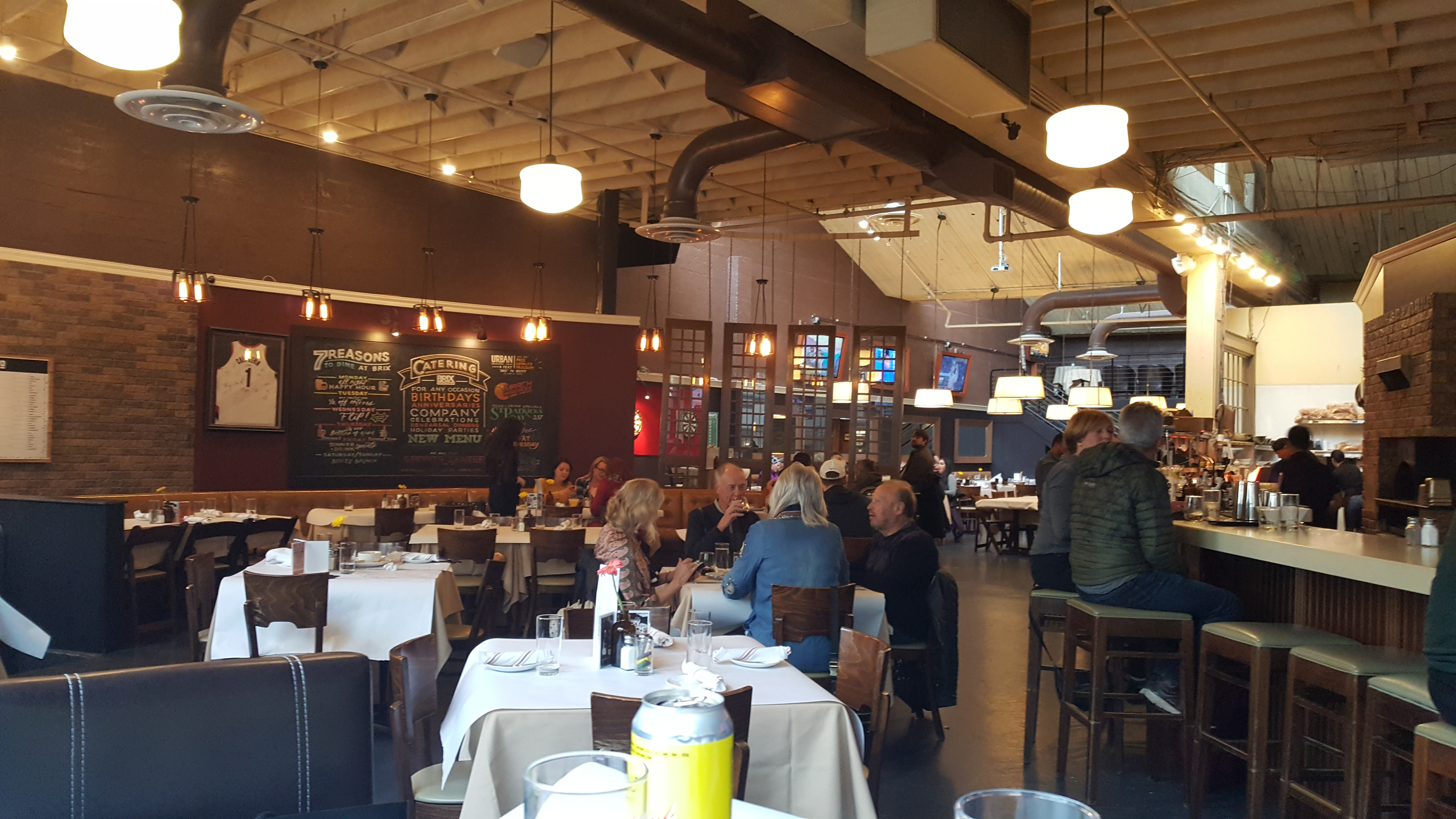
The flagship restaurant's interior, 2022

In 2013, The Oregonian's David Sarasohn gave Brix Tavern a "B−" rating, which he described as "almost a permanent party" and a "boisterous celebration" because of the seemingly constant happy hour, writing: "On a good evening, you can hear Brix Tavern down the street, and possibly across I-405." He recommended the rotisserie chicken tacos, the prime rib, and Heath bar brownie. Sarasohn also complimented the shrimp on polenta for "manag[ing] to retain their freshness and sweetness" but found the beef platter "inconsistent" and did not prefer the fried chicken or pizza. He also said, "Food at Brix is ample if inconsistent, and at some times the prices can be particularly inviting." In her 2017 search for the best local wood-fired pizza, The Oregonian's Samantha Bakall wrote:

Somewhere, Brix went wrong with their "brick oven fired" pizza. The margherita that hit the table almost seemed slid out of [a] frozen pizza box, with no char at all, save for a few spots on the bottom of the floury, cracker-like dough. But, buried under a heavy hand of both shredded and blobs of mozzarella was a very tasty, almost meaty roasted tomato sauce. We just can't get past the flavorless and chalky crust.

In her 2014 Portland food guide, Laurie Wolf wrote:

This is good American comfort food, with standout dishes including anything cooked on the rotisserie. The pizzas are good and the prime rib Cobb salad is hearty and different. I am a sucker for truffle anything, and their truffled mac and cheese is crusty and comforting ... The rib eye is cooked well and the shared trio of beef platter is a great idea, very well executed.

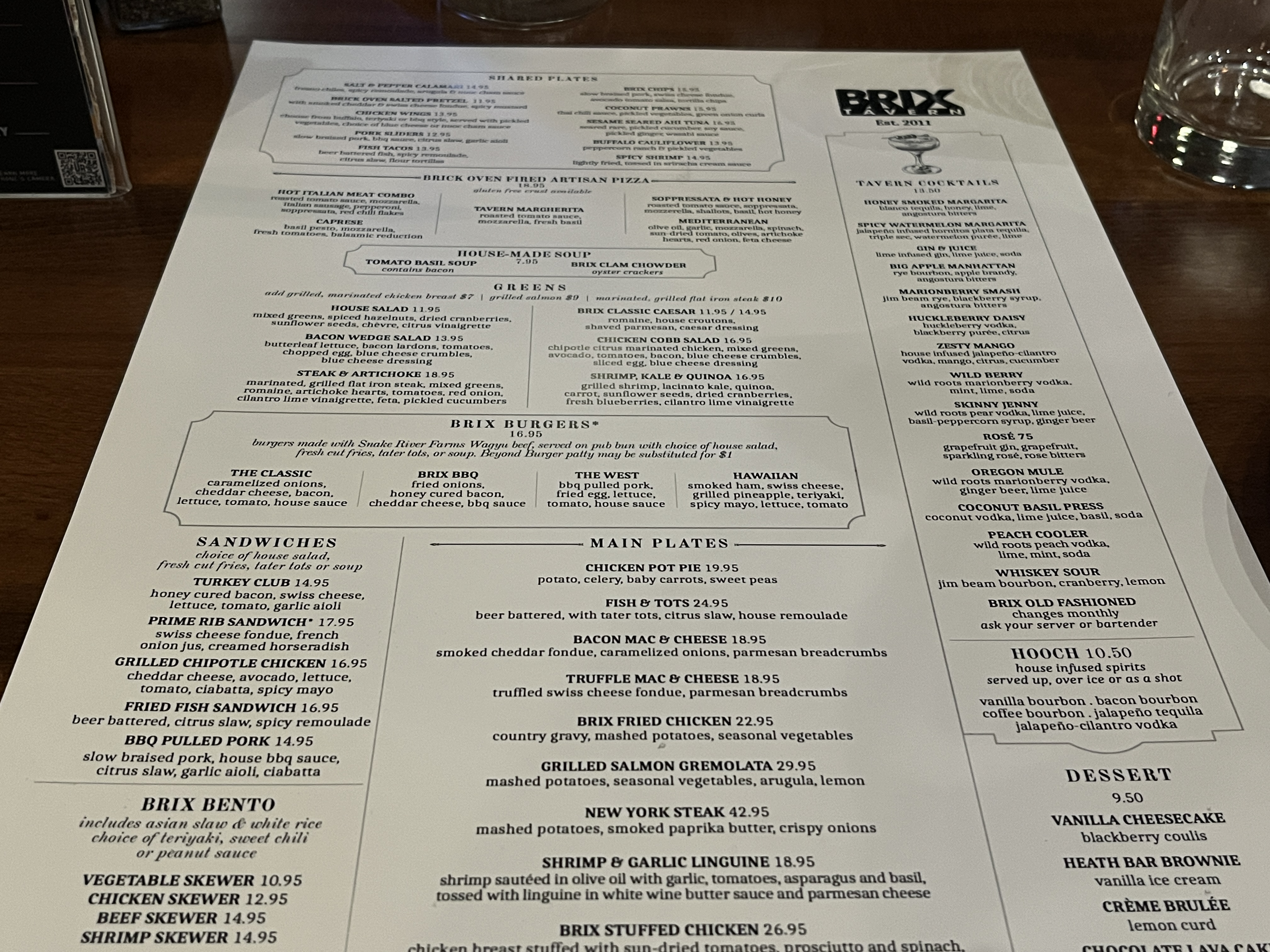
Menu (2024)

In 2015, Willamette Week's Matthew Korfhage said Brix has the city's "weirdest drink specials". The venue was placed third in the "Night Light Lounge" and "Best Mimosa" categories in 2016 and 2017 readers' polls, respectively. In a 2017 review of brunch destinations for visiting families or children, the Portland Mercury said, "Bustling tourists surround the charming street-side tables in the Pearl, and their spacious, exposed brick dining room would be ideal for any stylish, slightly judgmental aunts who happen to be visiting Portland." In his 2017 and 2019 happy hour reviews, Wm. Steven Humphrey called Brix Tavern a "great pit stop after work" that is "slightly rambunctious, and with the possibility of live jazz". He said the "lengthy" happy hour menu complements Brix's "already lively" and "inviting" atmosphere, and features "inventive and unrelentingly fresh" cocktails. He recommended the seared tuna. In 2020, the same paper's Jenni Moore recommended the shrimp and grits and mimosas, writing:

While I typically visit this Pearl District for their all-night happy hour on Sunday and Monday, Brix Tavern appears to be one of the few remaining places in Portland offering refillable mimosas as part of a stellar brunch experience. So it should come as no surprise that it's also the type of place where reservations (yes, for brunch) are recommended. Especially during high sportsball season, when everyone and their whole family intends to catch a game on one of Brix Tavern's multiple flatscreens.

According to Thrillist, "Brix cracked our list of Favorite 5 Sports Bars due to its rarified Pearl [District] atmosphere, which allows you to knock back rotisserie meats and brick oven-fired pizzas at fancy table-clothed four-tops and still scream at the games playing on their many, many flatscreens, all before holding it down at the pool table or on arcade games like Buck Hunter." Zagat gave Brix Tavern ratings of 4.3 for food, 4.4 for decor, and 4.4 for service, each on a scale of 5. The guide said, "This Pearl District find leads a double life as a classy modern restaurant with a well-executed menu of American comfort favorites and also as a large TV-and game-filled bar; service is friendly, prices are generally low and insiders suggest brew fans get the surprise beer in a paper bag (bartender's choice)".

== See also ==
- List of New American restaurants
- List of restaurant chains in the United States
