= Louis dressing =

Salad dressing

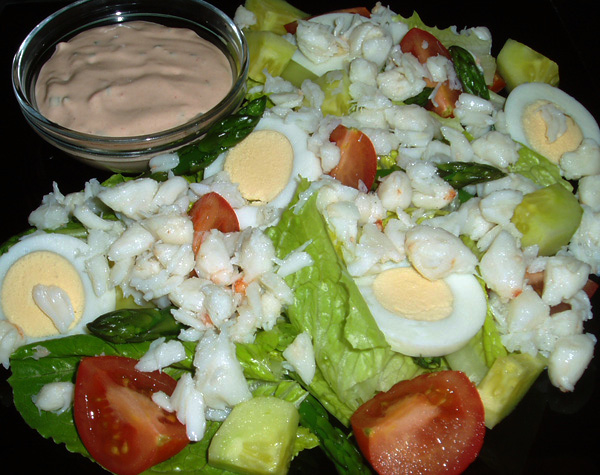
- A Crab Louie salad with Louis dressing on the side
- Type: Salad dressing
- Place of origin: United States
- Main ingredients: Mayonnaise, red chili sauce, green onions, green chili peppers

Louis dressing is a salad dressing based on mayonnaise, to which red chili sauce, minced green onions, and minced green chili peppers have been added. It is commonly used as a dressing for salads featuring seafood, such as a crab (Crab Louis) or shrimp (Shrimp Louis).

== Origin ==
The origin of the dressing is disputed. The Olympic Club in Seattle, The Davenport Hotel in Spokane, Washington, Solari's Restaurant, Bergez-Frank's Old Poodle Dog Restaurant and the St. Francis Hotel in San Francisco, and the Bohemian in Portland all claim to be the home of the dressing, with the invention in either the 1900s or 1910s. In all cases, the original salad was made with Dungeness crab.

From The American Heritage Cookbook published 1964:

- 1 cup (~240 mL) mayonnaise
- 1/4 cup (~60 mL) chili sauce
- 2 Tbsp finely diced or grated onion
- 2 Tbsp fresh parsley, chopped fine
- A pinch or two of cayenne
- 1/2 cup (~120 mL) heavy cream, whipped

The first five ingredients are combined and the whipped cream folded in.
