= Wonder Ballroom =

Music venue and historic building in Portland, Oregon, U.S.

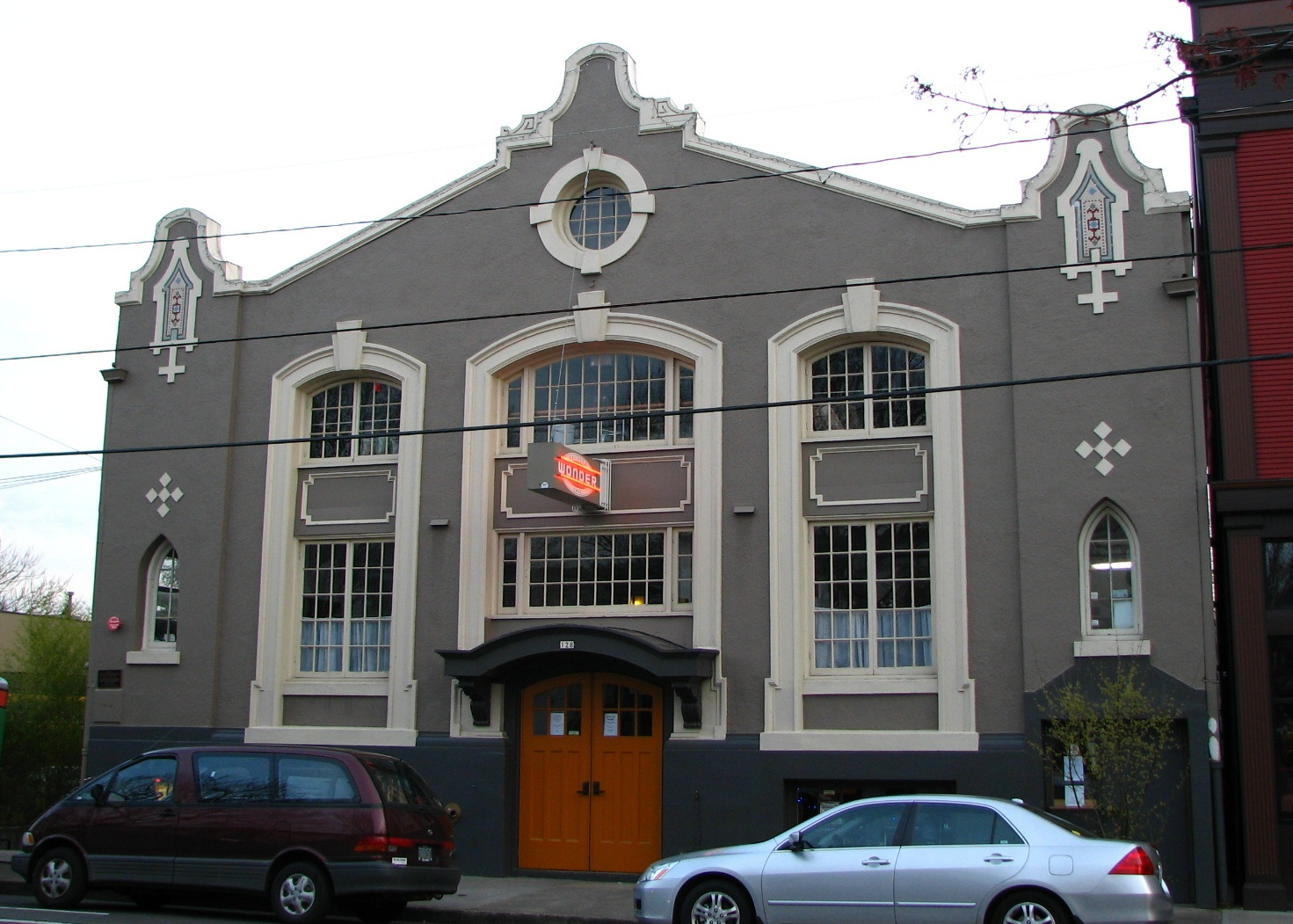
- Front of the Wonder Ballroom in 2008
- Interactive map of Wonder Ballroom
- Address: 128 Northeast Russell Street
- Location: Portland, Oregon
- Owner: Mark Woolley, Chris Monlux, Howie Bierbaum
- Seating type: Standing room, open seating
- Capacity: 778 (open floor)
- Type: Music venue

Construction
- Built: 1914
- Opened: 2004
- Renovated: 1948, 1957, 2004

Website
- www.wonderballroom.com
- Hibernian Hall
- U.S. National Register of Historic Places
- Portland Historic Landmark
- Location within Portland, Oregon
- Coordinates: 45°32′26″N 122°39′48″W
- Area: less than one acre
- Built: 1914
- Architect: Jacobberger, Joseph & Smith, Alfred; Jacobson, Hjalmar
- Architectural style: Mission/Spanish Revival
- MPS: Eliot Neighborhood MPS
- NRHP reference No.: 05000826
- Added to NRHP: August 4, 2005

The Wonder Ballroom is a music venue located in northeast Portland, Oregon. Prior to opening in 2004, the building (originally constructed in 1914) was occupied by the Ancient Order of Hibernians, the Catholic Youth Organization, the Portland Boxing School, the American Legion organization, and a community center eventually known as the Collins Center. In 2005, the building was listed on the National Register of Historic Places as the Hibernian Hall for its "historic and architectural significance".

== History ==
Originally built in 1914 for the Ancient Order of Hibernians, an organization committed to immigration reform and the preservation of Irish culture, the building known today as the Wonder Ballroom was designed by the architecture firm of Jacobberger & Smith. The group's first meeting in the newly constructed building was held on September 10, 1914. After membership of the group fell, the building was turned over to the Catholic Church in 1936. The Catholic Youth Organization and Portland Boxing School occupied the building until about 1941. Ownership of the building was transferred to the American Legion Organization in 1938, allowing the American Legion Navy Post No. 101 to operate in the space during World War II. In 1948, a renovation in the auditorium resulted in lower ceilings. The building was sold to Evelyn Collins in 1956, who hoped to create a community center and day care facility. The following year, another remodel took place to comply with new building codes, and windows were added to the east side of the hall. Upon completion, the center operated for more than 25 years as the Community Center Nursery, the Christian Community Center, and eventually the Collins Center.

By 2002, the building was shuttered due to a lack of funds by the Collins estate. In 2004, the building was purchased by Mark Woolley and Chris Monlux and remodeled for the music venue, and one year later it was placed on the National Register of Historic Places as the Historic Hibernian Hall for its "historic and architectural significance".

== Description ==
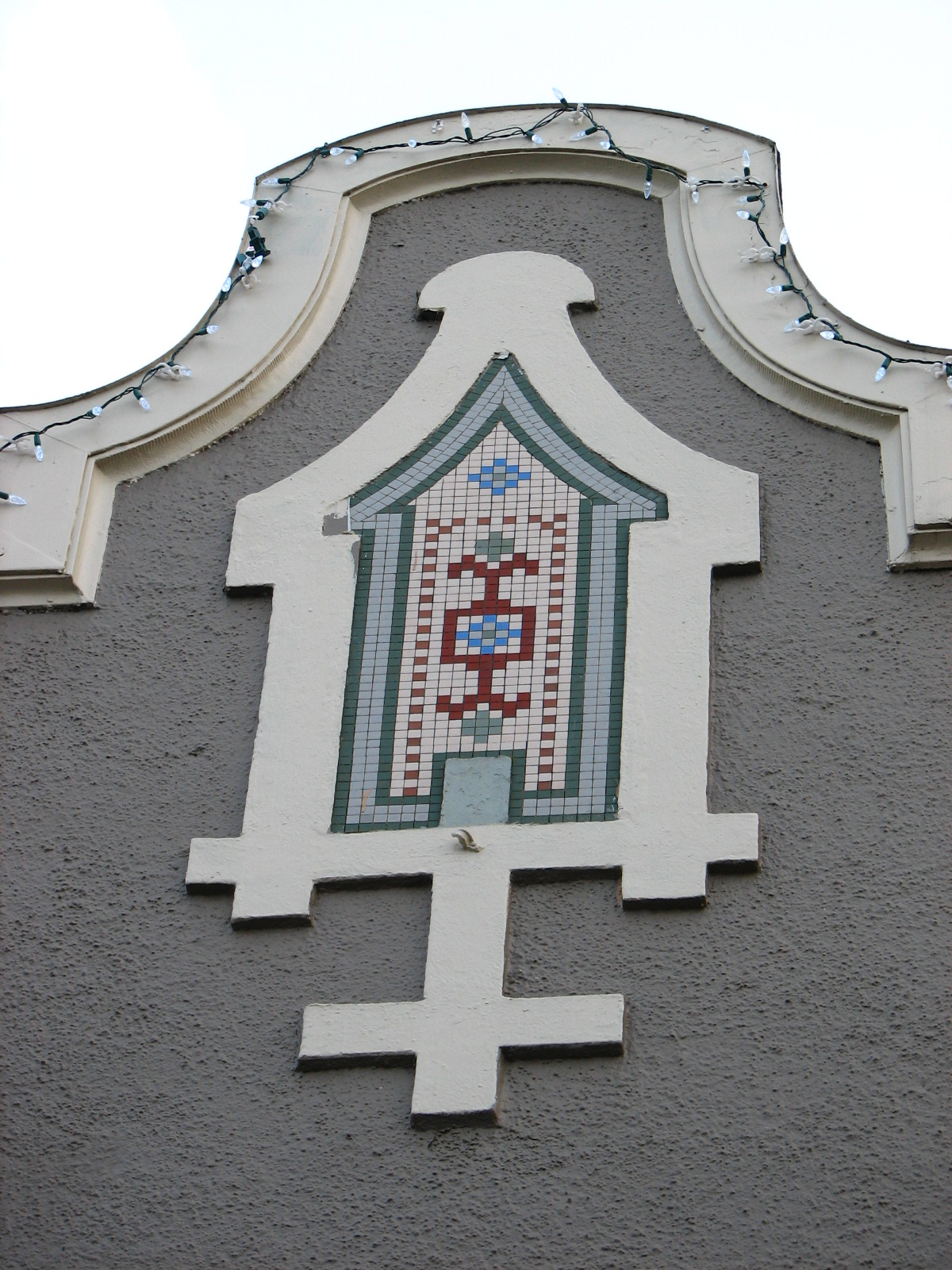
Detail of the front of the building in 2008

The Wonder Ballroom's auditorium is painted in "subtle, earthy tones" and is lit by a gothic-style chandelier and sconces. The main floor measures 70 feet (21 m) by 50 feet (15 m), with a stage that measuring 25 feet (7.6 m) wide by 16–18 feet deep. The 2,700-square-foot (250 m^{2}) Mark Woolley Gallery, once the Hibernians' assembly room, houses works by local artists.

=== Under Wonder Lounge ===
The basement level of the building features a café called Under Wonder Lounge (formerly Café Wonder), which offers cocktails and "sophisticated comfort food" such as macaroni and cheese, burgers, meatloaf, and chicken croquettes. In 2006, Justin Sanders of The Portland Mercury described its menu as a "pleasing array of good ol' fashioned mama's kitchen down-hominess with just enough artful flourishes to keep things interesting."

In 2012, the venue was replaced by Tex-Mex restaurant Trigger, which operated until 2013, when it was replaced by a Bunk Sandwiches location. In 2019, Bunk Sandwiches sold the operation to longtime manager Josh Luebke and his wife, Sarah Luebke, who ran the business under the name Cliff's. In September 2025, it was announced that Wonder Ballroom planned to convert the space into a dedicated lounge for venue goers.

== Reception ==
Wonder Ballroom was a finalist in the Best Music Venue category of Willamette Week's annual 'Best of Portland' readers' poll in 2025.

== See also ==
- Culture of Portland, Oregon
- Knights of Columbus Building (Portland, Oregon), another Jacobberger & Smith building
- National Register of Historic Places listings in Northeast Portland, Oregon
