= Knights of Columbus Building (Portland, Oregon) =

Former building in Portland, Oregon, U.S.

- Formerly listed on the U.S. National Register of Historic Places
- Front in 1981

- Location within Portland, Oregon
- Location: 804 SW Taylor Street, Portland, Oregon
- Coordinates: 45°31′5.63″N 122°40′53.59″W
- Area: 0.2 acres (0.081 ha)
- Built: 1920
- Architect: Jacobberger & Smith; Whitehouse & Church
- Architectural style: Late Gothic Revival
- Demolished: 1998
- NRHP reference No.: 90000830

Significant dates
- Added to NRHP: June 1, 1990
- Removed from NRHP: March 18, 1998

The Knights of Columbus Building, also known as the Aero Club Building, in Portland, Oregon, was a Late Gothic Revival architecture building that was built in 1920. It was listed on the National Register of Historic Places from 1990 until its demolition. The building was demolished in 1998. The property is now the site of the Paramount Hotel.

The Knights of Columbus inaugurated the building as its Portland lodge on October 21, 1920. It was designed by the Portland architectural firm of Jacobberger & Smith. By 1937, the Knights organization had moved out. In July 1937, the building was purchased by the Aero Club of Oregon (the Portland chapter of the National Aeronautics Association), who at the time were using a nearby building. The building underwent a remodeling in fall 1937, using plans designed by Portland-based Whitehouse & Church, the partnership of Morris H. Whitehouse and Walter E. Church.

== See also ==
- National Register of Historic Places listings in Southwest Portland, Oregon
- Wonder Ballroom, another Jacobberger & Smith building
