= Paramount Hotel (Portland, Oregon) =

Hotel in Portland, Oregon, U.S.

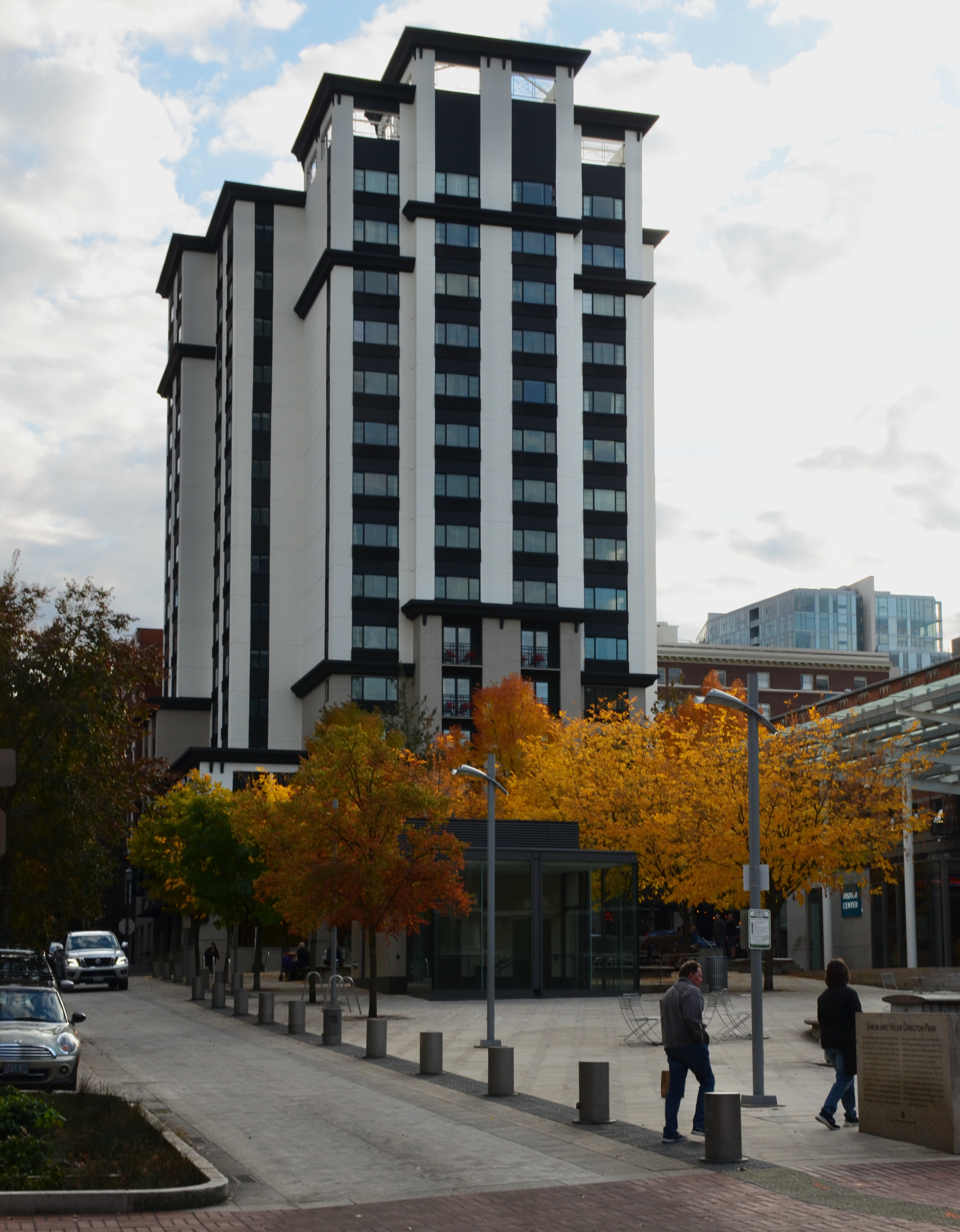
- The hotel in 2019 with part of Director Park in the foreground
- Interactive map of the Paramount Hotel area

General information
- Location: 808 Southwest Taylor Street, Portland, Oregon, United States
- Coordinates: 45.518032°N 122.681526°W

The Paramount Hotel in Portland, Oregon is a hotel building at 808 Southwest Taylor Street in downtown Portland. The Knights of Columbus Building formerly occupied the site. Construction began in the late 1990s. Paramount was completed in 2000, and renovated in 2011.

The restaurant and bar Swank & Swine has occupied the building's first floor since mid-2014. It replaced Asian fusion establishments Tasting East and TE:bar.
