= Bunk Sandwiches =

Sandwich restaurant chain based in Portland, Oregon, U.S.

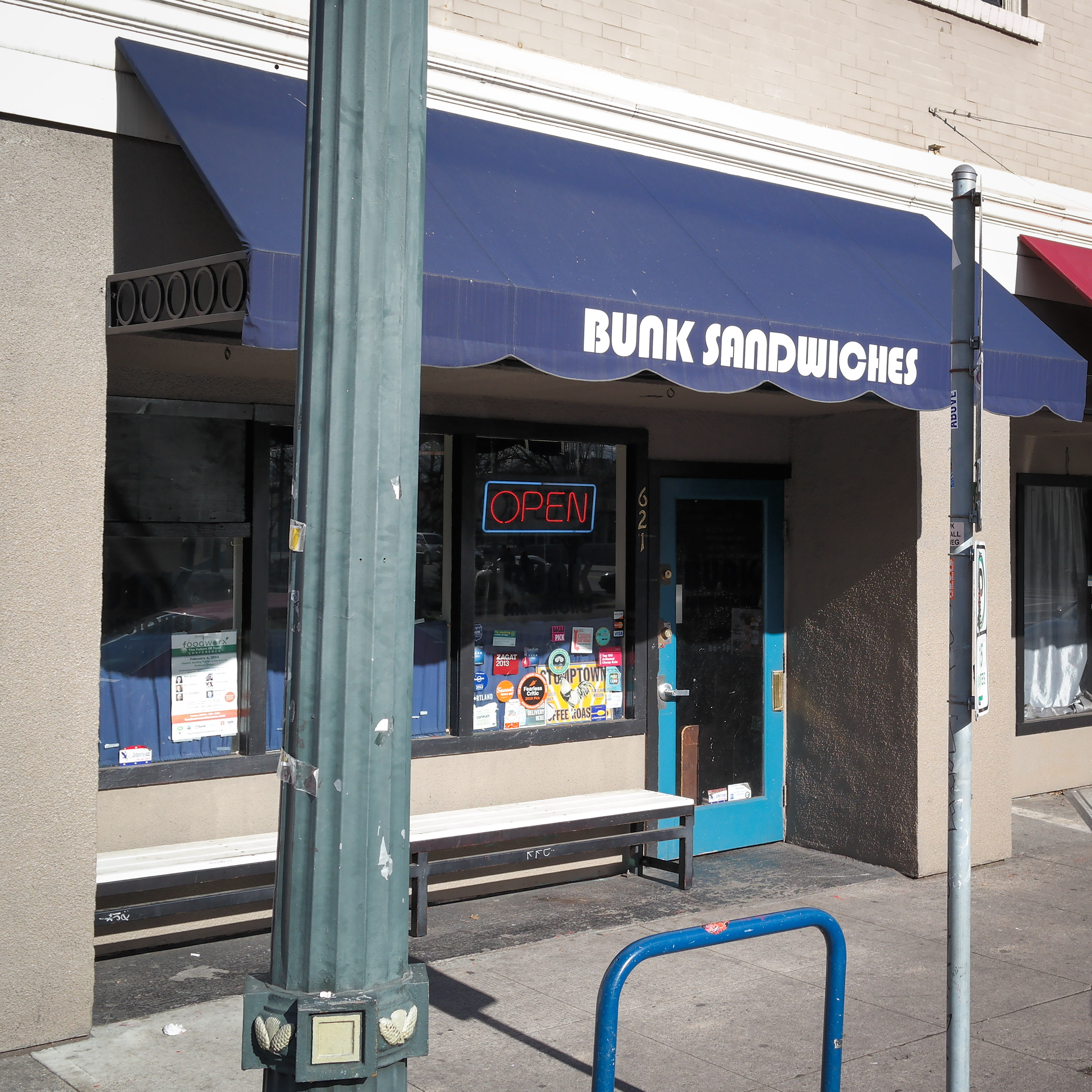
- Bunk Sandwiches on Southeast Morrison in Portland, Oregon, 2014
- Industry: Restaurants
- Area served: Portland, Oregon, New York City

Bunk Sandwiches is a sandwich restaurant in Portland, Oregon, United States. Formerly a chain, the business has operated multiple locations in the city as well as Brooklyn.

== History ==
In 2018, the original location on Morrison closed, leaving restaurants on Alberta and Southeast Water Avenue, in downtown Portland, and below the Wonder Ballroom. The Alberta restaurant offered free sandwiches on National Grilled Cheese Day.

The Bunk Bar below the Wonder Ballroom operated from 2012 to 2019. The Alberta location closed in 2020, during the COVID-19 pandemic. A location at Bridgeport Village closed on January 31, 2025.

Bunk expanded to Williamsburg, Brooklyn in November 2015; the restaurant closed in January 2017.

Bunk has been featured on Food Network's Diners, Drive-Ins and Dives.

== Reception ==
In 2015, Matthew Korfhage of Willamette Week included the Pork Belly Cubano in his list of "12 Wonders of Portland Food". Alex Frane included Bunk in Thrillist's 2020 list of "The Best Sandwiches in Portland to Order Right Now". The business was included in Portland Monthly's 2025 list of 25 restaurants "that made Portland".

== See also ==
- List of Diners, Drive-Ins and Dives episodes
- List of restaurant chains in the United States
