= Poodle Dog Restaurants =

Restaurants in San Francisco

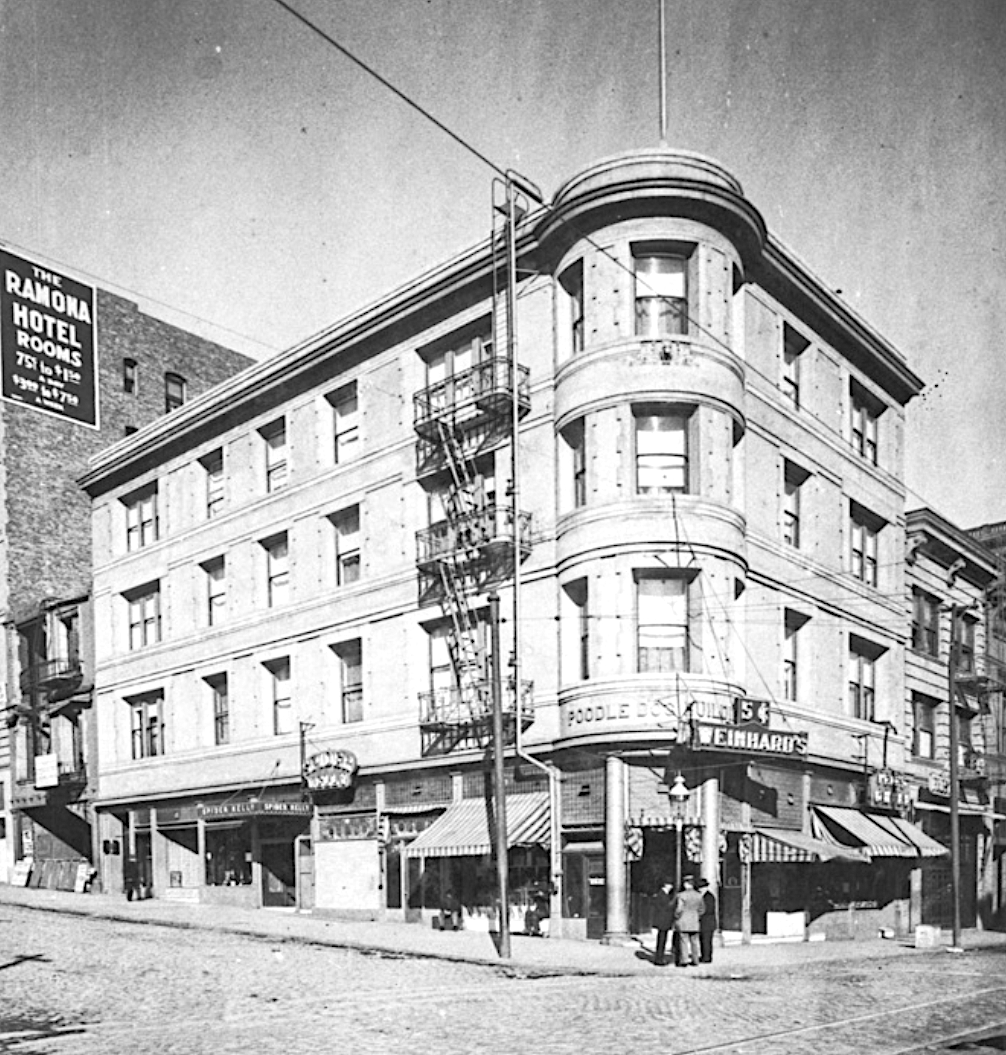
- Image of Poodle Dog (c. 1915) Mason Street at Eddy Street, San Francisco

Restaurant information
- Established: circa. 1849
- Closed: circa. mid–1960's
- Other locations: San Francisco, California, United States

The Poodle Dog Restaurants were a series of French Restaurants in San Francisco, California, spanning from at least 1849 to the mid-1960s. The successive restaurants were mostly unrelated, but each built on the former's success and reputation. During its heyday, the Poodle Dog was the epitome of wealth and opulence in San Francisco, catering to important statesmen, financial leaders, and business tycoons. It also developed a racy reputation for catering to those men's need for a discreet place to meet with their mistresses and ladies of the night. More than anything, it was well known for having impressive foods, being labeled as "the best French restaurant in the city," if not the "best dollar dinner on Earth".

== History ==
=== Prospectors and early San Francisco ===
The Poodle Dog Restaurants trace their origin to San Francisco's earliest days as a city. The first iteration of the Poodle Dog appears to have been a California Gold Rush era restaurant that provided inexpensive French cuisine to those seeking their fortune. Historians do not agree on the origin story of the Poodle Dog's name. Indeed, it has been suggested that the name came from the first proprietor's family dog, or that it was named "Poulet D'Or or Poule D'Or which was unpronounceable to the average American", or that a stray poodle known for begging there became the unofficial mascot and the proprietors "named the restaurant after it for good luck". In any event, historians do agree that there was a Poodle Dog restaurant from San Francisco's earliest days.

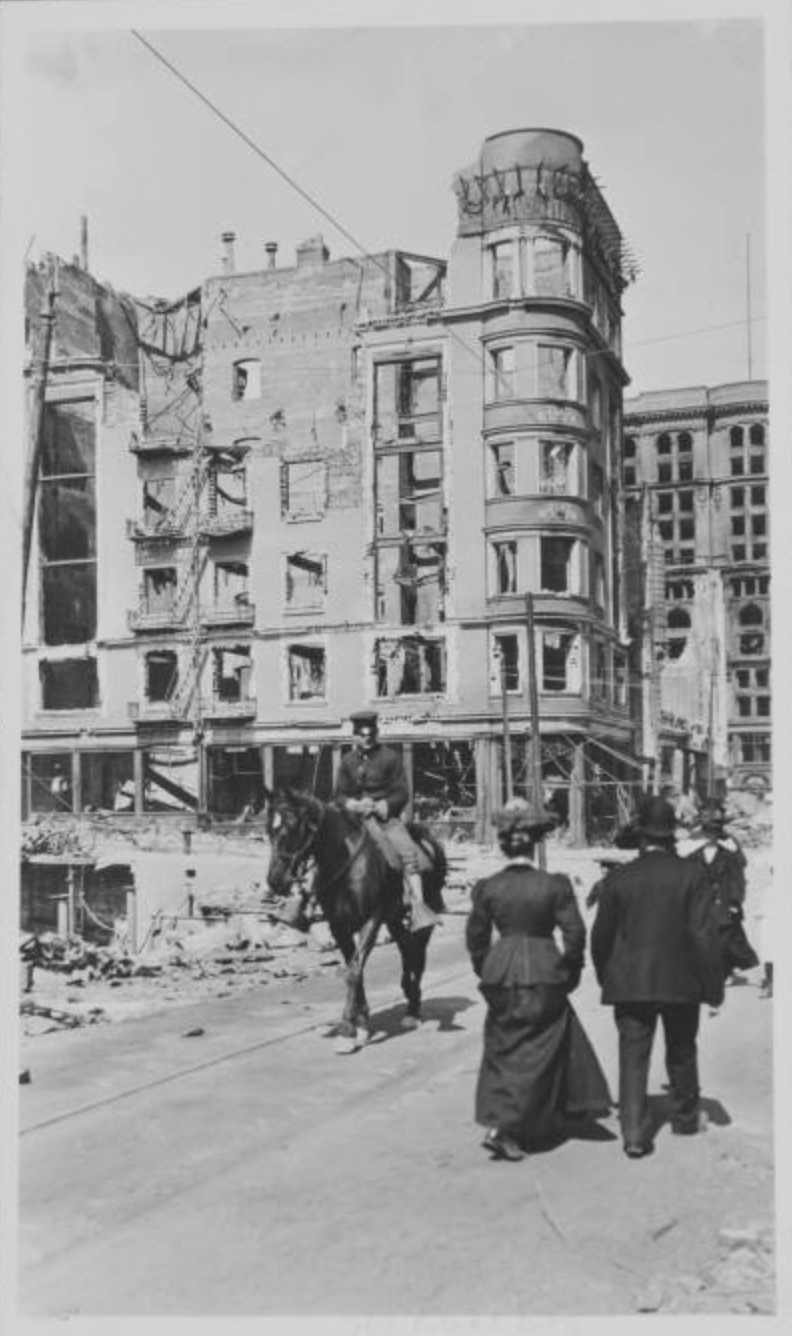
Poodle Dog at Mason and Eddy, after the 1906 San Francisco Earthquake

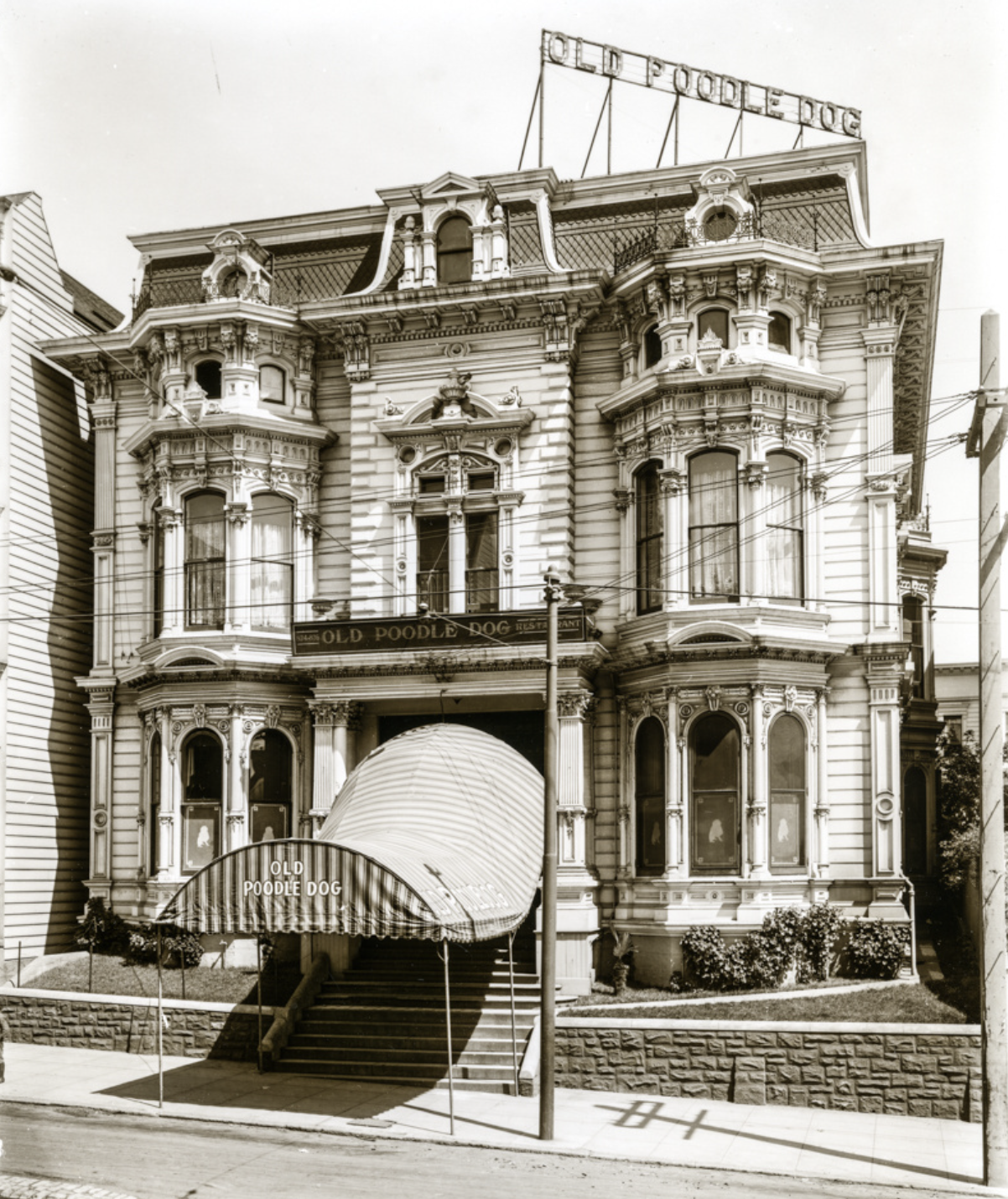
Old Poodle Dog (c. 1908) at 824–826 Eddy Street at Van Ness

The Poodle Dog quickly became a popular restaurant beloved by San Franciscans. By 1868, it had transitioned away from simple French cooking to fine dining with more extravagant food. The clientele shifted accordingly: "Instead of the raw miner, its patron was the stiff collared banker, the frock-coated judge, the spade-beard lawyer - the Argonaut with a little more culture and greyer hair". The Poodle Dog maintained this level of sophisticated diner until its closing, some 100 years later.

=== Gilded Age: 1890s through prohibition ===
The Poodle Dog shifted again from mere fine dining to all-out opulence and luxury by the 1890s. Some say this era saw its "greatest popularity as a rendezvous and a restaurant". Diners could expect 23 courses and an even larger wine selection by the end of the century. The menu reflected this: it had swelled to 17 pages. As for the cooking facilities, the Poodle Dog boasted a "vast wine cellar and vegetable rooms, bottling rooms . . . refrigerators . . . a laundry". Cooks there also enjoyed one of a kind dishwashers and stoves, making it notable not to diners but to chefs as well.

During this era, the Poodle Dog earned its reputation as a "five-storied dome of pleasure". During the lunch hour, it was a "who's who" of famous and powerful businessmen, such as "poets, journalists, physicians, politicians, and luminaries of law". It is said that "the destinies of many important business undertakings was settled at these noon dinners."

The Poodle Dog also had a decidedly more racy reputation in the evenings. It was well known for "its private upstairs dining chambers and love nooks [lending] a sort of Parisian air to the city's nightlife". This reputation was well-documented, and came with an expected level of scandal involving the city's elite, including the mayor of San Francisco.

The 1906 San Francisco Earthquake "put an unhappy end" to the gilded days of the Poodle Dog. The restaurant maintained its reputation - both in the dining room and upstairs - during this era, but it was never the same as the gilded era. Finally, Prohibition dealt it the "finishing blow," and the PD closed its doors on April 15, 1922. The proprietors felt that a French restaurant without wine was not worth keeping open.

=== Later days ===
The Poodle Dog remained closed until 1933, when Calixte LaLanne, a former proprietor, reopened it. This iteration was called the "Ritz French Restaurant," until his son changed it back to Poodle Dog after Calixte's death in 1943. The restaurant remained open, although not in the same splendor, until it closed for good in the mid-1960s.

== Notable restaurateurs ==
- François Péguillan (also known as Eugene Péguillan, or Francois Peguilhan), from New Orleans, Louisiana
- Langsman
- Jacob Joseph Stork (1815–1883), from Baden, Germany
- Nicholas F. Richit (?–1862)
- Augustus Esnault
- Jean "John" Bergez (1854–1917), an "epicure and sportsman," originally from Cette-Eygun, France. Known as one of San Francisco's most famous restaurateurs of the era.
- Jean Baptiste Pon (1858–1933)
- Louis Coutard (1864–1908)
- Camille Mailhebuau (1867–1924)
- Calixte "Cal" LaLanne (1873–1943)
  - Louis Jacques Lalanne (1898–1968), Cal's son
  - Louis Calixte Lalanne (1927–2018), Cal's grandson
Notable restaurateurs

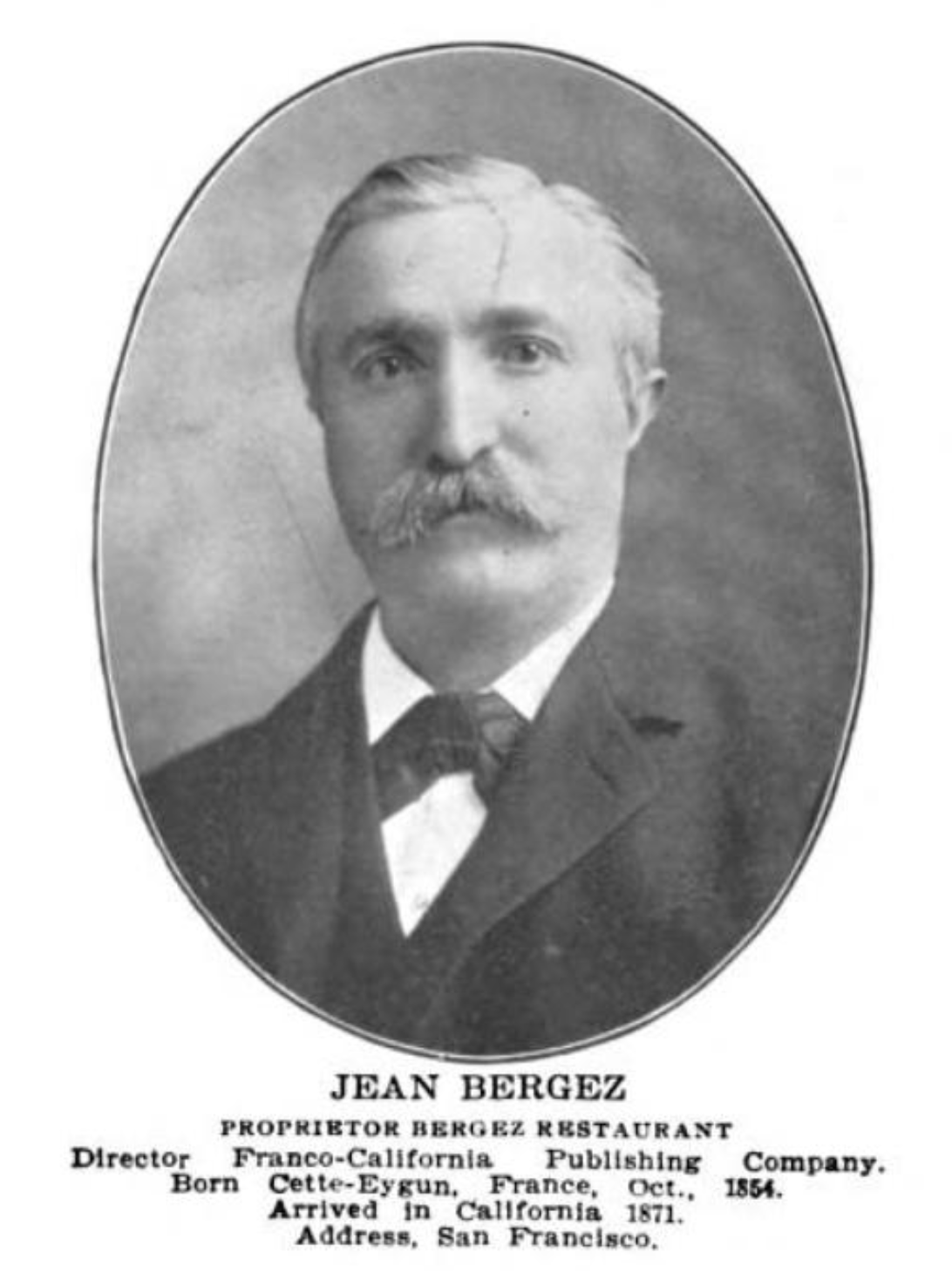
Jean "John" Bergez

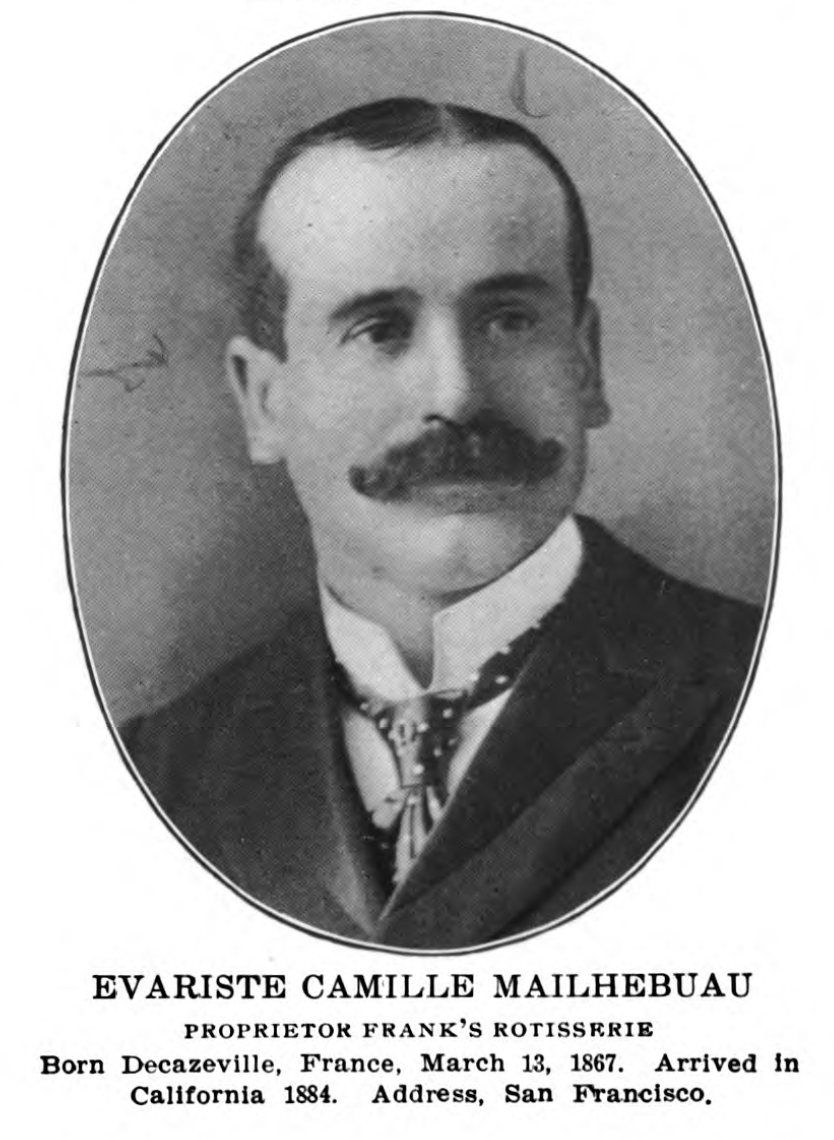
Camille Evariste Mailhebuau

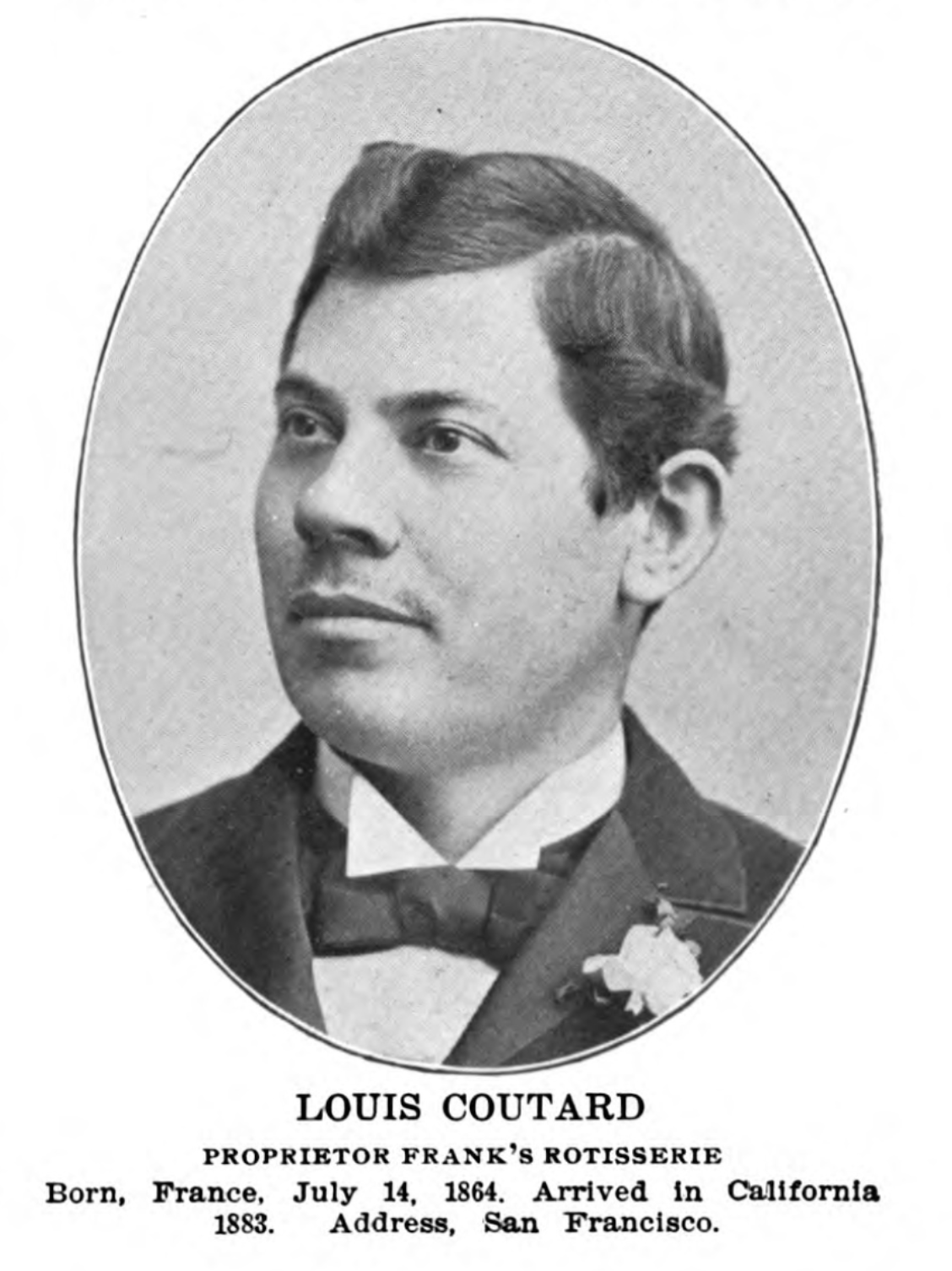
Louis Coutard

== Known locations ==
- 1849: Washington Street & Grant Avenue (then DuPont), although also claimed to be near Clay and Grant (then DuPont). Other historians believe the first Poodle Dog did not open until 1858, and that its first proprietor was Nicholas Richit.
- 1868: Bush Street & Grant Avenue., although some say this location did not open until 1873.
- 1898: 151 Mason Street at Eddy Street, although some say this move did not happen til 1895. Location is now Parc 55 San Francisco.
- 1906: 824 Eddy Street.
- 1908: Bergez–Frank's Old Poodle Dog Restaurant, 415 Bush Street.
- 1920: New Montgomery and Stevenson Street.
- 1942: Ritz French Restaurant, 65 Post Street, later "Ritz Poodle Dog"

== Legacy ==
=== Crab Louie ===
Many restaurants, past and present, claim to have invented Crab Louis. Historians agree that Bergez-Frank's Old Poodle Dog has one of the strongest of those claims. Bergez-Frank's originally had a special menu item titled "Crab Leg a la Louis," named for famed restaurateur and co-owner of the Poodle Dog after his death in 1908.

=== California State Library Foundation Bulletin ===
The Poodle Dog was recognized with a cover story in the California State Library Foundation's Bulletin in 2006.
