= Cette-Eygun =

- Commune
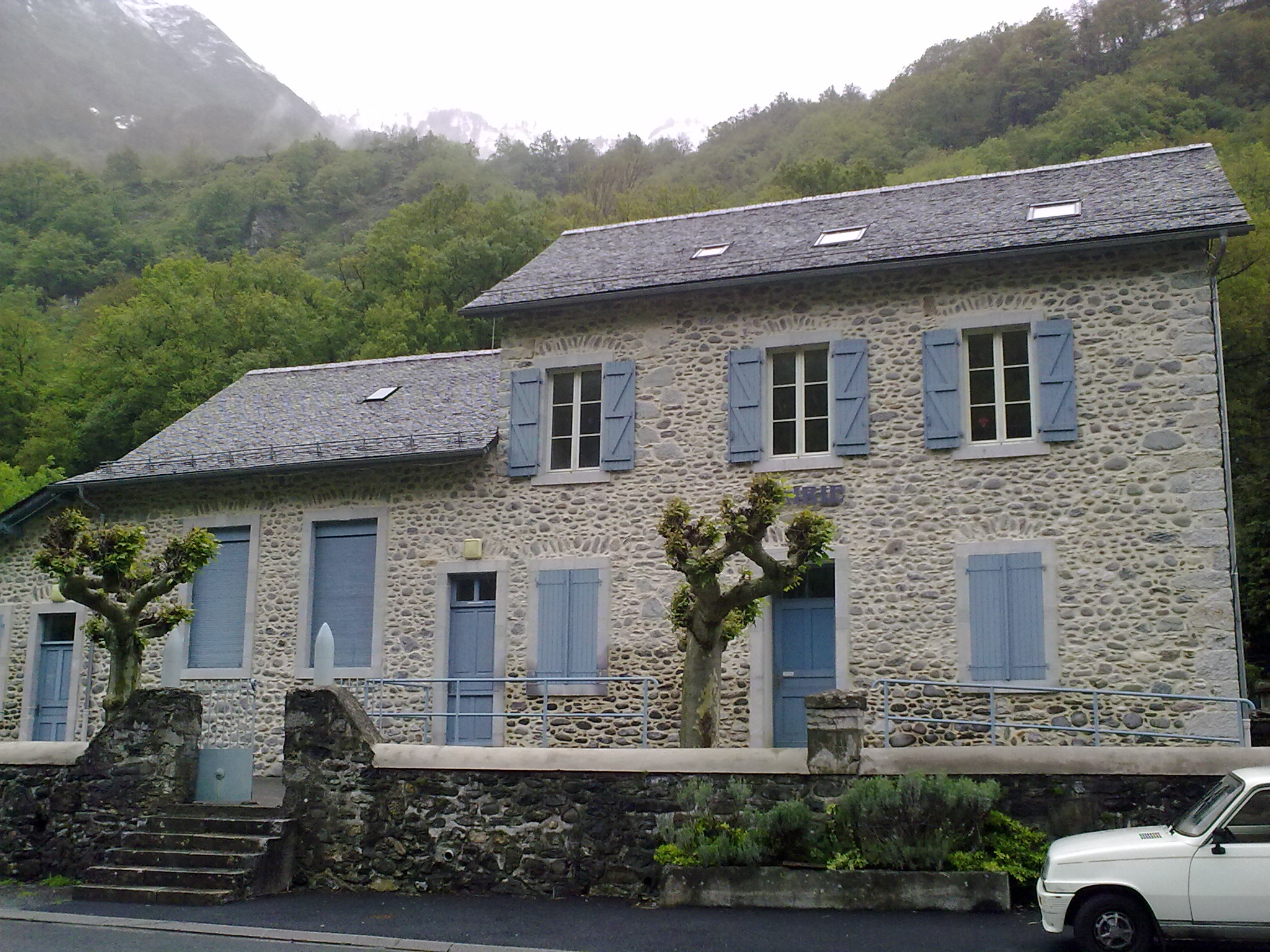
- Town Hall of Cette-Eygun
- Location of Cette-Eygun
- Location within France Location within Nouvelle-Aquitaine
- Coordinates: 42°56′15″N 0°35′17″W
- Country: France
- Region: Nouvelle-Aquitaine
- Department: Pyrénées-Atlantiques
- Arrondissement: Oloron-Sainte-Marie
- Canton: Oloron-Sainte-Marie-1
- Intercommunality: Haut Béarn

Government
  - Mayor (2020–2026): Ophélie Escot
- Area^{1}: 18.97 km^{2} (7.32 sq mi)
- Highest elevation: 2,560 m (8,400 ft)
- Lowest elevation: 501 m (1,644 ft)
- Population (2023): 66
  - Density: 3.5/km^{2} (9.0/sq mi)
- Time zone: UTC+01:00 (CET)
  - Summer (DST): UTC+02:00 (CEST)
- INSEE/Postal code: 64185 /64490
- ^{1} French Land Register data, which excludes lakes, ponds, glaciers > 1 km^{2} (0.386 sq mi or 247 acres) and river estuaries.

Cette-Eygun (French pronunciation: [sɛt eɡœ̃]; Occitan: Cèta e Eigun) is a commune in the Pyrénées-Atlantiques department in south-western France.

The famous restaurateur Jean Bergez emigrated from Cette-Eygun to San Francisco, California around 1877. He worked his way up in the restaurant business before becoming one of the proprietors of the acclaimed Bergez-Frank's Old Poodle Dog in San Francisco.

Its station on the Pau–Canfranc railway was closed after an accident in 1970.

== See also ==
- Communes of the Pyrénées-Atlantiques department
