= Shrimp Louie =

Salad dish from California, United States

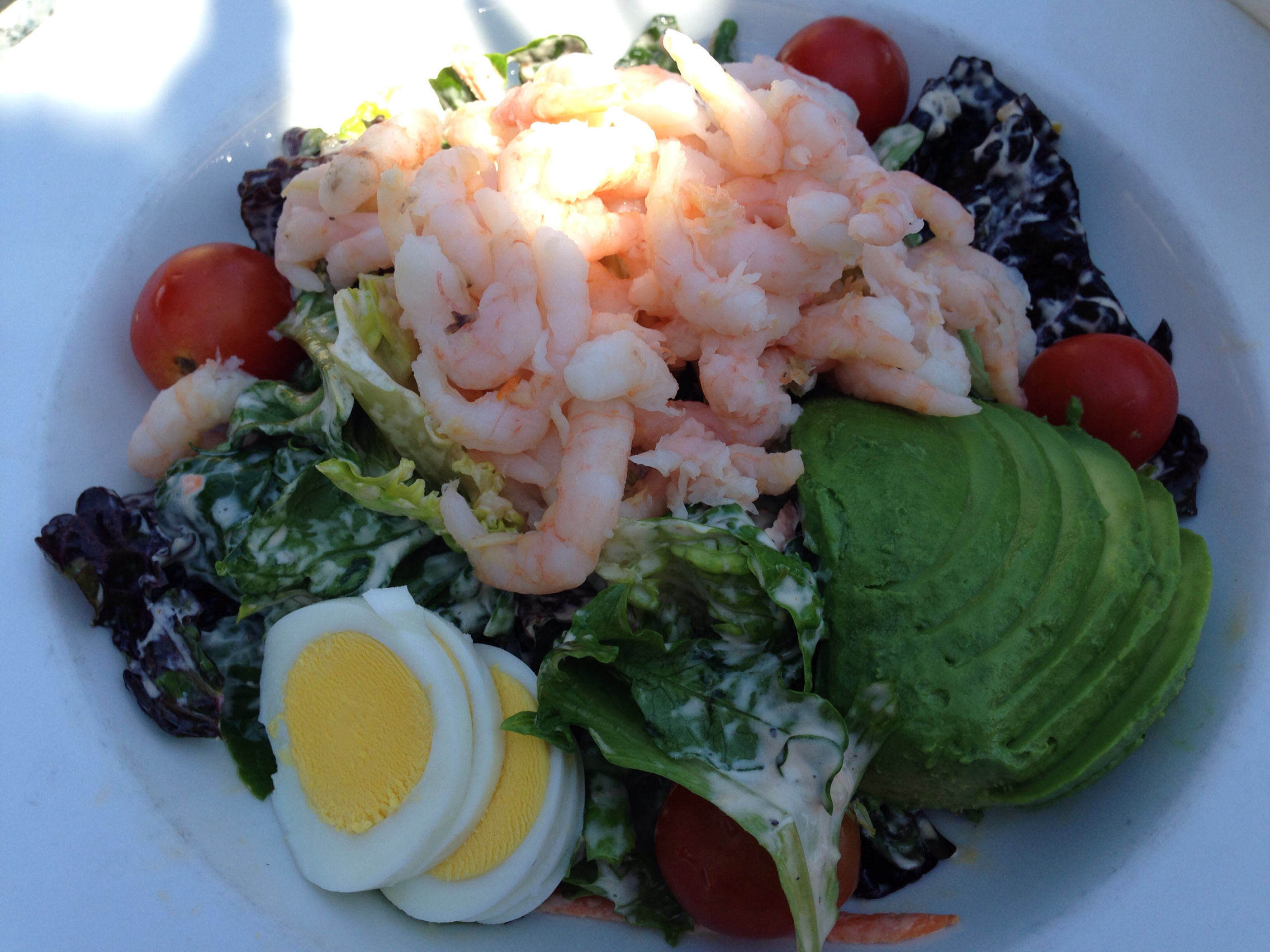
- Shrimp Louie salad showing main ingredients
- Alternative names: Shrimp Louis
- Course: Hors d'œuvre
- Place of origin: United States
- Region or state: West Coast
- Serving temperature: Chilled or room temperature
- Main ingredients: Shrimp meat, hard-boiled eggs, tomato, asparagus, Iceberg lettuce, Louis dressing

Shrimp Louie is a traditional salad from California made with shrimp, lettuce, egg and tomato. The dressing is similar to Thousand Island dressing and is made with mayonnaise, ketchup, chili sauce, Worcestershire sauce, onion, salt, and pepper. Shrimp Louie originated in San Francisco in the early 1900s. A variation on the salad includes avocado. A version made with crab is known as Crab Louie.

== See also ==
- List of salads
