= Crab Louie =

Type of salad

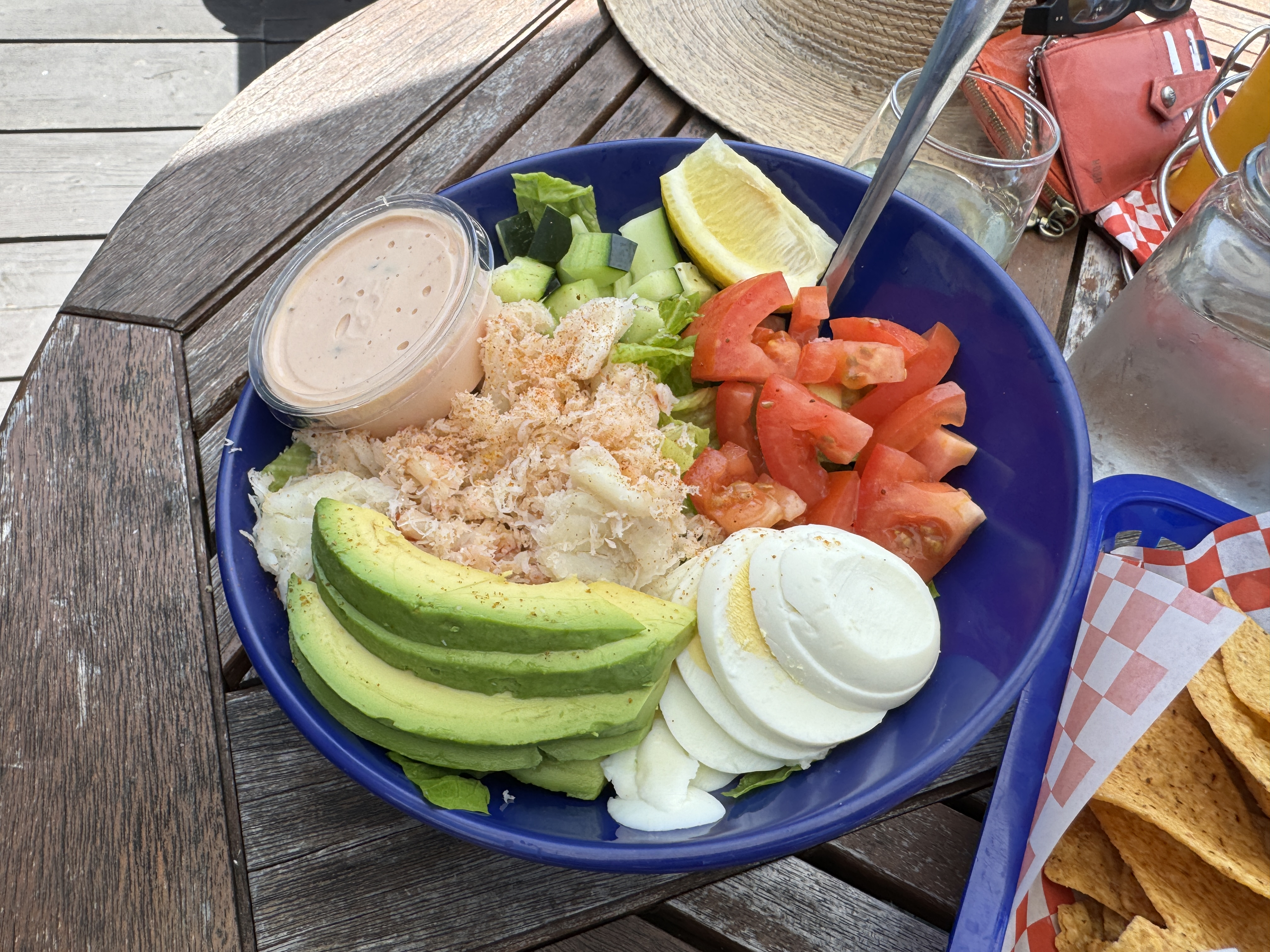
- A Crab Louie salad in Fort Bragg, California in 2024.
- Alternative names: Crab Louis
- Course: Hors d'œuvre
- Place of origin: United States
- Region or state: West Coast
- Serving temperature: Chilled or room temperature
- Main ingredients: Crab meat, hard-boiled eggs, tomato, asparagus, Iceberg lettuce, Louis dressing

Crab Louie salad, also known as Crab Louis salad or the King of Salads, is a type of salad featuring crab meat. The recipe dates back to the early 1900s and originates on the West Coast of the United States.

== History ==
The exact origins of the dish are uncertain, but it is known that Crab Louie was being served in San Francisco, at Solari's, as early as 1914. A recipe for Crab Louie exists from this date in Bohemian San Francisco by Clarence E. Edwords, and for a similar "Crabmeat a la Louise" salad in the 1910 edition of a cookbook by Victor Hirtzler, head chef of the city's St. Francis Hotel. Another early recipe is found in The Neighborhood Cook Book, compiled by the Portland Council of Jewish Women in 1912. San Francisco's Bergez-Frank's Old Poodle Dog restaurant menu included "Crab Leg à la Louis (special)" in 1908, named for the chef Louis Coutard who died in May 1908.

Other accounts place the salad's origin as The Davenport Hotel in Spokane, Washington; or the Olympic Club in Seattle.

== Ingredients ==
The main ingredient for Crab Louie, as the name suggests, is crab meat. The preferred crab is Dungeness crab, but other crab meat can be substituted, including cheaper imitation crab meat. Although variations of the recipe exist, an essential ingredient is a creamy dressing such as Louis dressing, Thousand Island dressing or green goddess dressing. This dressing is either served on the side or mixed with the other ingredients, depending on which recipe is used.

A typical Crab Louie salad consists of:

- Crab meat
- Hard-boiled eggs
- Tomato
- Cooked asparagus
- Iceberg lettuce
- Louis dressing, based on mayonnaise and chili sauce

Other ingredients such as olives and green onions have also been listed in some recipes.

A variation called the Lobster Louie is prepared the same way, but substitutes lobster instead of crab meat.

== See also ==
- List of salads
- Shrimp Louie
