= Carlita's =

Restaurant in Portland, Oregon, U.S.

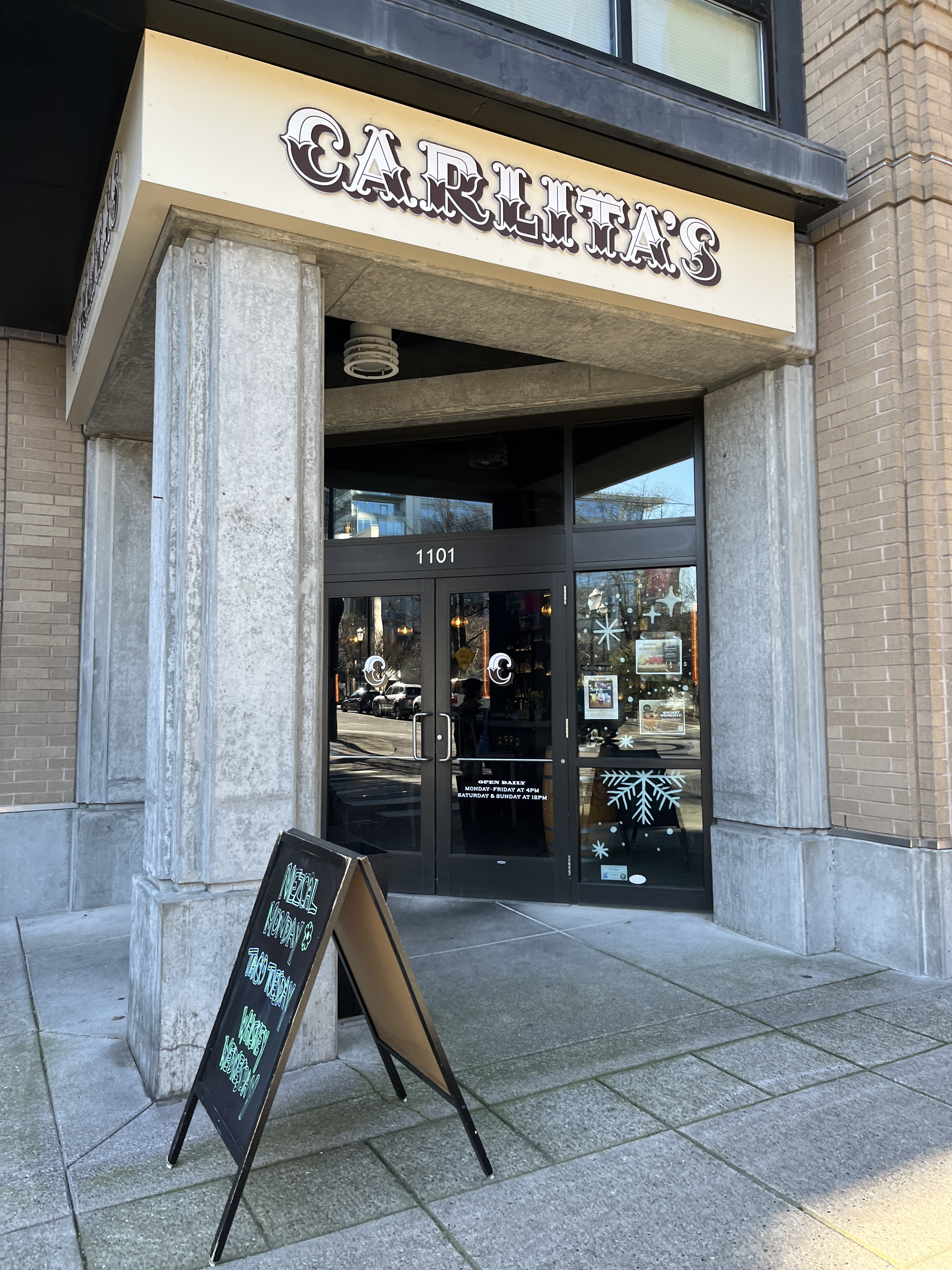
- The restaurant's exterior, 2025
- Interactive map of Carlita's

Restaurant information
- Established: 2017
- Owner: Urban Restaurant Group
- Food type: Mexican
- Location: 1101 Northwest Northrup Street, Portland, Multnomah, Oregon, 97209, United States
- Coordinates: 45.5317°N 122.6828°W
- Seating capacity: 80

Carlita's is a restaurant in Portland, Oregon, United States. Urban Restaurant Group opened the restaurant in the Pearl District in 2017, followed by the outpost Carlita's Rooftop in Eugene in 2021.

== Description ==
The 80-seat Mexican-themed restaurant Carlita's operates on Northrup Street in northwest Portland's Pearl District. The business has billed itself as the city's first "spirits-forward taco bar". Fodor's has described Carlita's as "a modern take on a Mexican cantina", serving "Northwest-meets-Mexico fare". The outdoor patio seats an additional 20 people.

The menu includes tacos with pork belly, salmon, and wild mushrooms, as well as Pacific ahi ceviche, apple-smoked carne asada, green-mole chicken, and tortilla chips with lime salt. Among salsas, which are made in-house, is a ghost pepper crema. Drink options include cocktails with agaves, mezcals, tequilas, and whiskeys.

== History ==
Carlita's is operated by Urban Restaurant Group. It opened in 2017, in the space previously occupied by Streetcar Bistro & Taproom.

As of July 2020, the outpost Carlita's Rooftop was slated to open on the seventh floor of the Gordon Hotel in Eugene in 2021. The outpost was nominated in the Best New Restaurant category of Eugene Weekly's annual "Best of Eugene" poll.

== See also ==
- List of Mexican restaurants
