= Swank and Swine =

Restaurant and bar in Portland, Oregon, U.S.

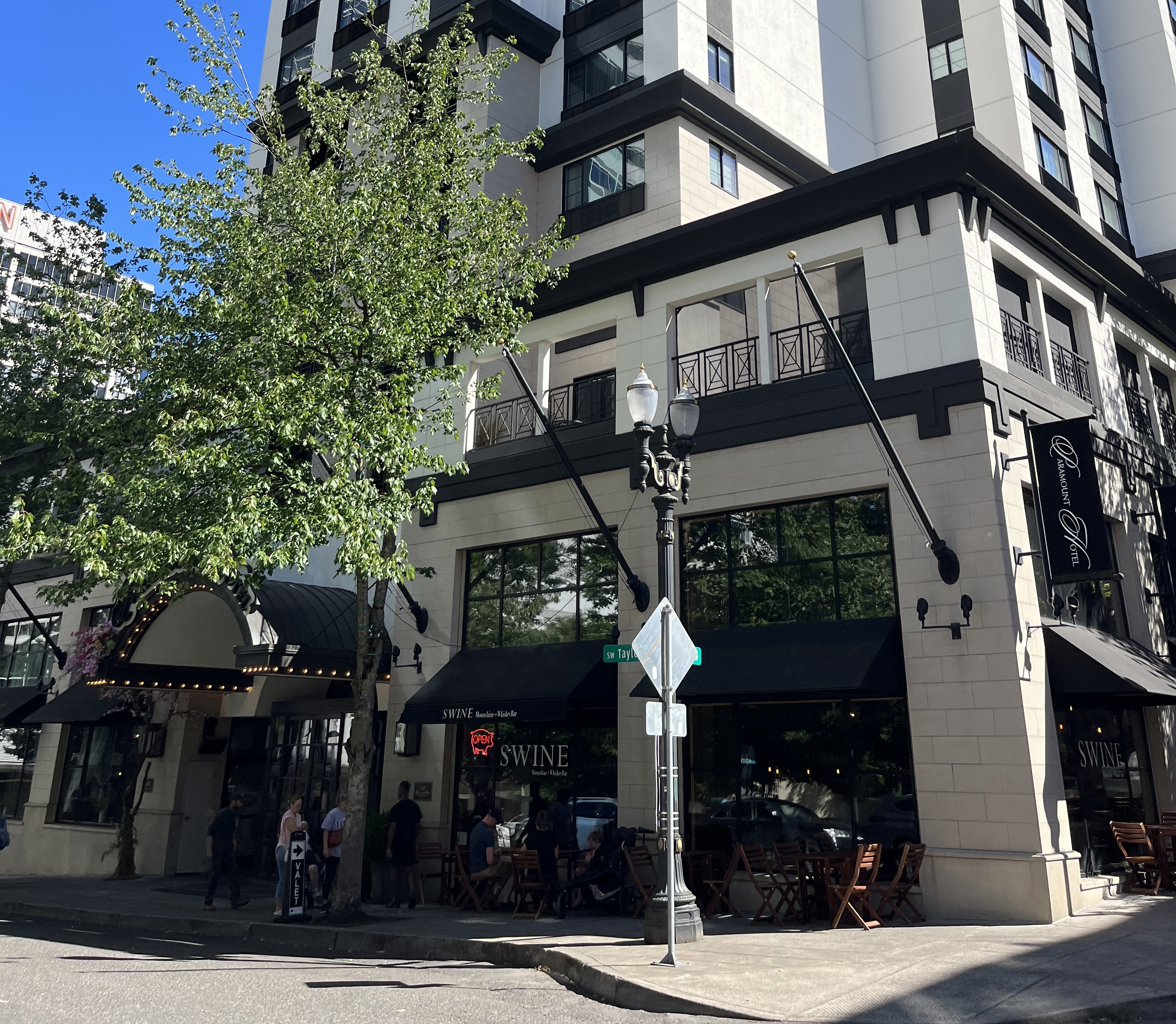
- Exterior of Swine, 2023
- Interactive map of Swank and Swine

Restaurant information
- Location: Portland, Oregon, United States
- Coordinates: 45°31′6″N 122°40′54″W

Swank and Swine is the collective name of the former restaurant Swank and the bar Swine, located in Portland, Oregon's Paramount Hotel, in the United States. Swank was rebranded as Taylor Street Tavern in 2022.

== Description ==
Swank and Swine is the collective name of former restaurant Swank (also known as the Swine Moonshine and Whiskey Bar) and the bar Swine. The restaurant, now rebranded as Taylor Street Tavern, and bar operate in the Paramount Hotel in downtown Portland, across from Director Park. The Oregonian's Grant Butler said Swank and Swine had a "pork-centric take on Southern cooking". Chad Walsh of Eater Portland has said Swank and Swine has "southern-inspired" flavors.

=== Swank ===
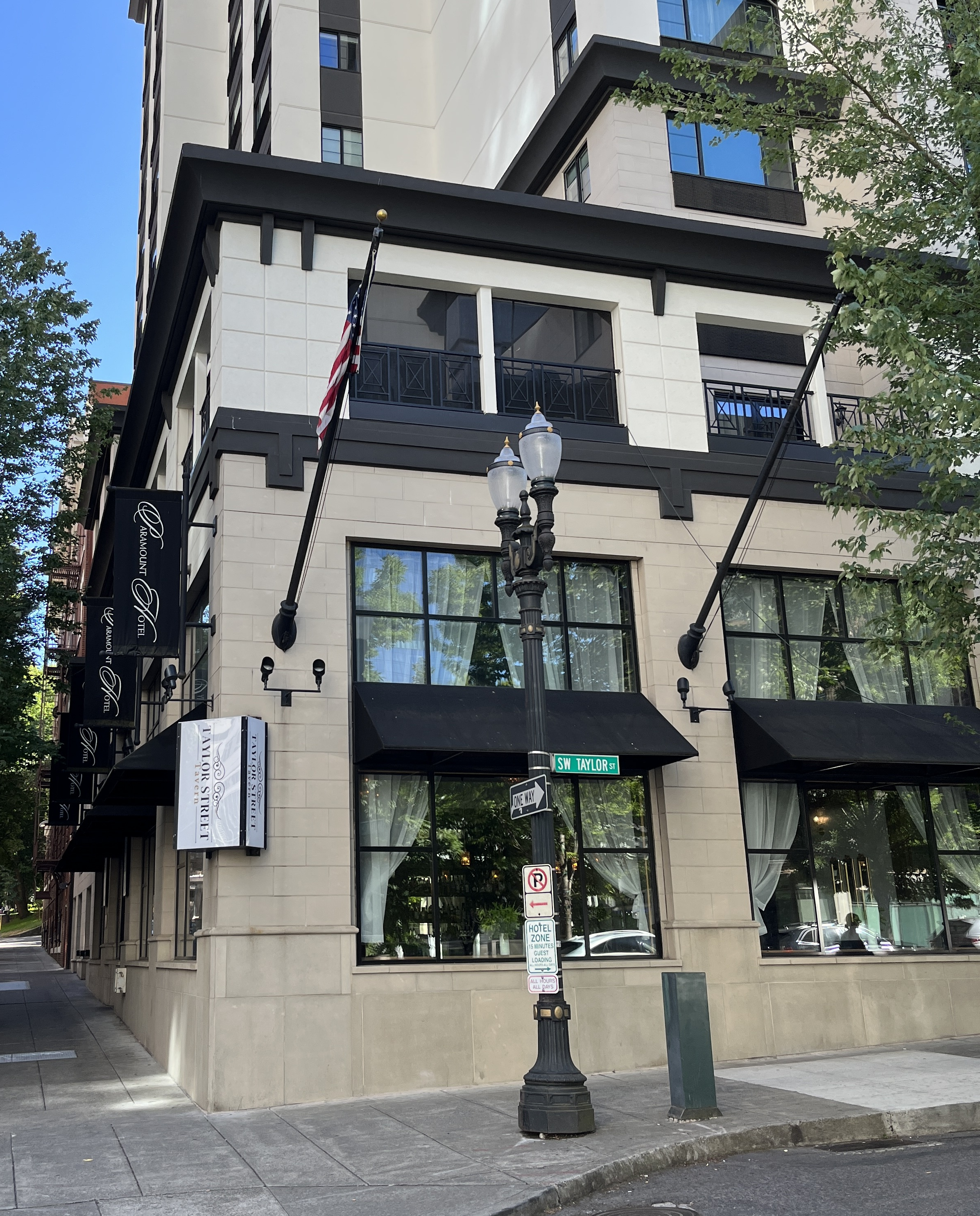
2023 photograph of the exterior of Taylor Street Tavern, which is housed in the space previously occupied by Swank

Swank was an 84-seat restaurant serving New American cuisine. The menu included calamari, hamachi collar and squid ink noodle dish ("pho"), lamb tartare with feta, sweetbreads and æbleskiver, foie gras with gravy, apricots, and buttermilk biscuit, rutabaga apple soup, and mushroom stroganoff. The lunch menu included sandwiches, pastas, and Shrimp Louie and duck confit.

=== Swine ===
Swine is a Prohibition-themed moonshine and whiskey bar. Ned Lannamann of the Portland Mercury wrote, "The vibe is an interesting combo of Old West primitive-chic and Scandinavian/Lutheran austerity, but there's more form than function going on here, right down to the fake whiskey still propped behind the bar." The menu includes pigs in a blanket, short ribs, fried chicken sliders, crab wontons, collard greens, and bacon cheesecake. Drinks include the Lion's Tail (Henry McKenna bourbon and lime), G.R. Clark (Old Forester 1870), and the Flu Shot (Dewar's and beet syrup). In 2017, Butler described the uniforms worn by staff as "lumbersexual chic".

== History ==
Urban Restaurant Group and chef Daniel Mondok opened the bar and restaurant in 2014. Alexander Sullivan-Parker was named executive chef in 2017.

For Thanksgiving in 2015, Swank offered a four-course dinner with roast turkey, Oregon salmon, Painted Hills steaks, and a Viridian Farms pumpkin pie. The restaurant also served a four-course dinner for Thanksgiving in 2016 and 2018.

In June 2022, Urban Restaurant Group rebranded Swank as Taylor Street Tavern. The restaurant reopened on June 23. Swine is slated to remain open.

== See also ==
- List of New American restaurants
