= Curzerenone =

Names
- Preferred IUPAC name (5R,6R)-6-Ethenyl-3,6-dimethyl-5-(prop-1-en-2-yl)-6,7-dihydro-1-benzofuran-4(5H)-one

Identifiers
CAS Number	20493-56-5
3D model (JSmol)	Interactive image
ChemSpider	2339429
PubChem CID	3081930
UNII	G4VCU0HQA2
CompTox Dashboard (EPA)	DTXSID40174471
- InChI: InChI=1S/C15H18O2/c1-6-15(5)7-11-12(10(4)8-17-11)14(16)13(15)9(2)3/h6,8,13H,1-2,7H2,3-5H3/t13-,15-/m0/s1 Key: ZVMJXSJCBLRAPD-ZFWWWQNUSA-N
- SMILES: CC1=COC2=C1C(=O)[C@@H]([C@@](C2)(C)C=C)C(=C)C

Properties
Chemical formula	C_{15}H_{18}O_{2}
Molar mass	230.307 g·mol^{−1}
- Except where otherwise noted, data are given for materials in their standard state (at 25 °C [77 °F], 100 kPa). Infobox references

Curzerenone is an antimicrobial isolate of Lindera pulcherrima.
