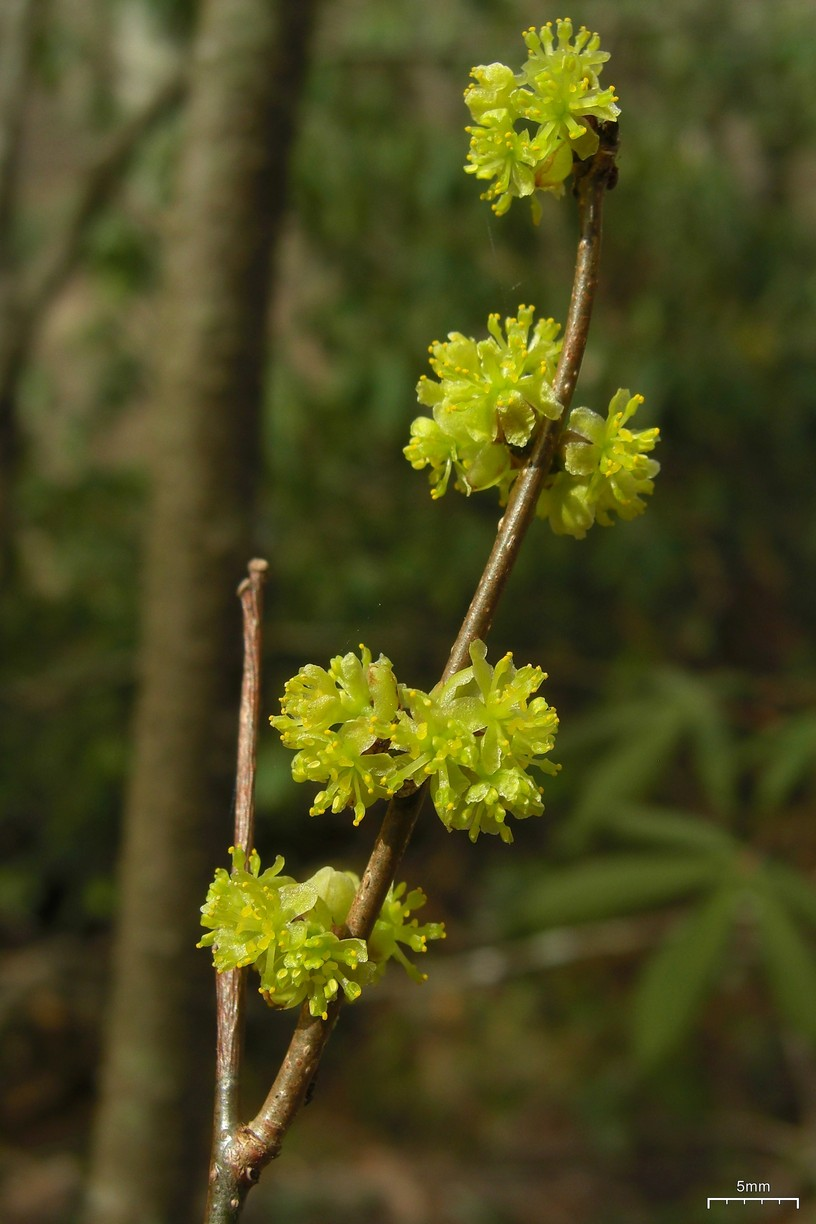

Conservation status
- Least Concern (IUCN 3.1)

Scientific classification
- Kingdom: Plantae
- Clade: Tracheophytes
- Clade: Angiosperms
- Clade: Magnoliids
- Order: Laurales
- Family: Lauraceae
- Genus: Lindera
- Species: L. benzoin

Binomial name
- Lindera benzoin L.
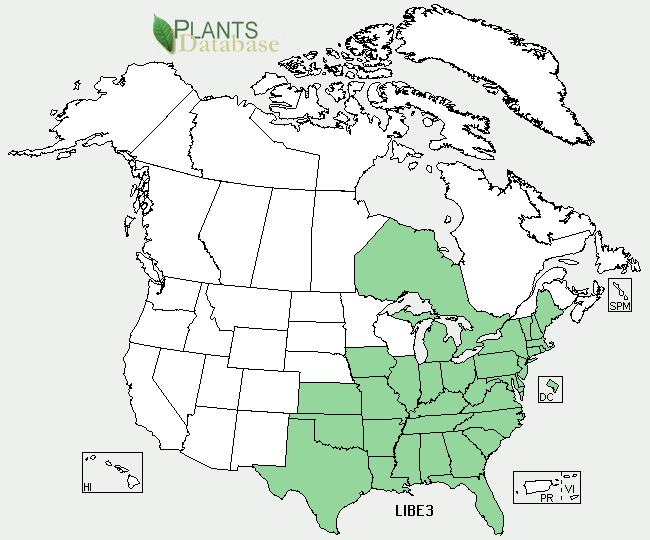
- Range within North America

Synonyms
- Benzoin aestivale Nees

= Lindera benzoin =

Species of shrub

Lindera benzoin (commonly called spicebush, common spicebush, northern spicebush, wild allspice, or Benjamin bush) is a shrub in the laurel family. It is native to eastern North America, growing in the understory in moist, rich woods.

== Description ==
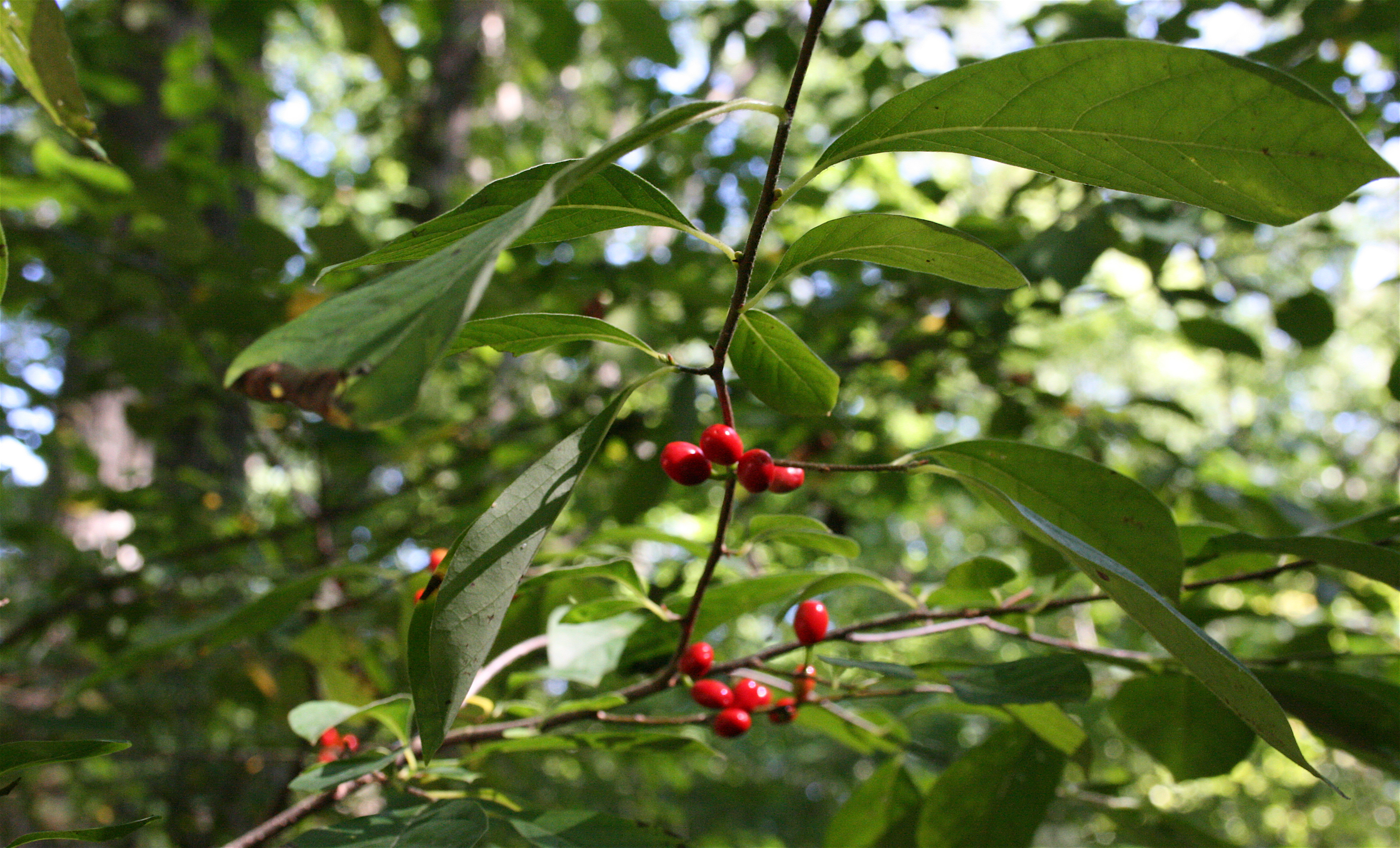
Detail of leaves and drupes

Spicebush is a deciduous shrub growing to 1.8–3.7 metres (6–12 ft) tall. It has a colonial nature and often reproduces by root sprouting, forming clumps or thickets. The leaves are alternately arranged on the stem, simple, 6–15 cm (2–6 in) long and 2–6 cm (1–2 in) broad, oval or broadest beyond the middle of the leaf. They have a smooth edge with no teeth and are dark green above and paler below. The leaves and stems are aromatic when crushed, having a spicy, citrusy smell, hence the common names and the specific epithet benzoin. In the fall the leaves turn bright yellow.

The yellow flowers grow in showy clusters which appear in early spring, before the leaves begin to grow. The flowers have six sepals and a very sweet odor. The ripe fruit is a red, ellipsoidal, berrylike drupe, rich in lipids, about 1 cm (1/2 in) long and is eaten by several bird species. It has a "turpentine-like" taste and aromatic scent, and contains a large seed. Spicebush is dioecious (plants are either male or female), so that both sexes are needed in a garden if one wants drupes with viable seeds.

Like other dioecious plants, the female plants have a greater cost of reproduction compared to the male plants. In the wild, the population tends to have more males than females possibly due to the heavier reproductive costs on females.

The stem of L. benzoin has a slightly rough, but flat, bark which is covered in small, circular lenticels which give it a rough texture.

=== Related or potentially confused species ===
Other species in the genus Lindera also have common names containing the word "spicebush" and may appear similar. An example is L. melissifolia, which grows in swamps in the southern US; it is differentiated by its hairy stems. Calycanthus (sweetshrub, spicebush) is in a different family within the order Laurales and also has aromatic leaves.

== Distribution and habitat ==
It is native to eastern North America. Within its native range it is a relatively common plant where it grows in the understory in moist, rich woods, especially those with exposed limestone.

== Cultivation ==
Spicebush is often cultivated in gardens or edges of gardens. The brightly colored fruits and early flowers along with the spherical growth form make the plant desirable in gardens. It is hardy in USDA zones 4–9 and tolerates shade excellently but will also grow in full sun. When grown in sun the plant tends to grow denser and have more berries and flowers compared to growing in shade or partial shade. It is best to grow the plant from seed as its extensive rootsystem does not handle transplanting well. At least three cultivars have been developed although they are rarely available:

- 'Rubra' has brick red male flowers, the winter buds are also a darker red brown color. Since it is male it produces no fruit.
- 'Xanthocarpa,' which has yellow-orange fruits, was discovered in Arnold Arboretum in 1967 by Alfred Fordham.
- 'Green gold' a male, non-fruiting cultivar with larger ornamental flowers.

Although several butterflies and moths used spicebush as a host, they are not considered serious pests.

== Ecology ==
Many animals feed on the leaves, twigs, and berries of spicebush. Some mammals include whitetail deer, Eastern cottontail rabbit, opossums. Over 20 species of birds including both gamebirds and song birds such as ring-necked pheasant, bobwhite, ruffed grouse and others have been known to feed on spicebush. The berries are a favorite food of wood thrushes.

=== Lepidopteran host plant ===
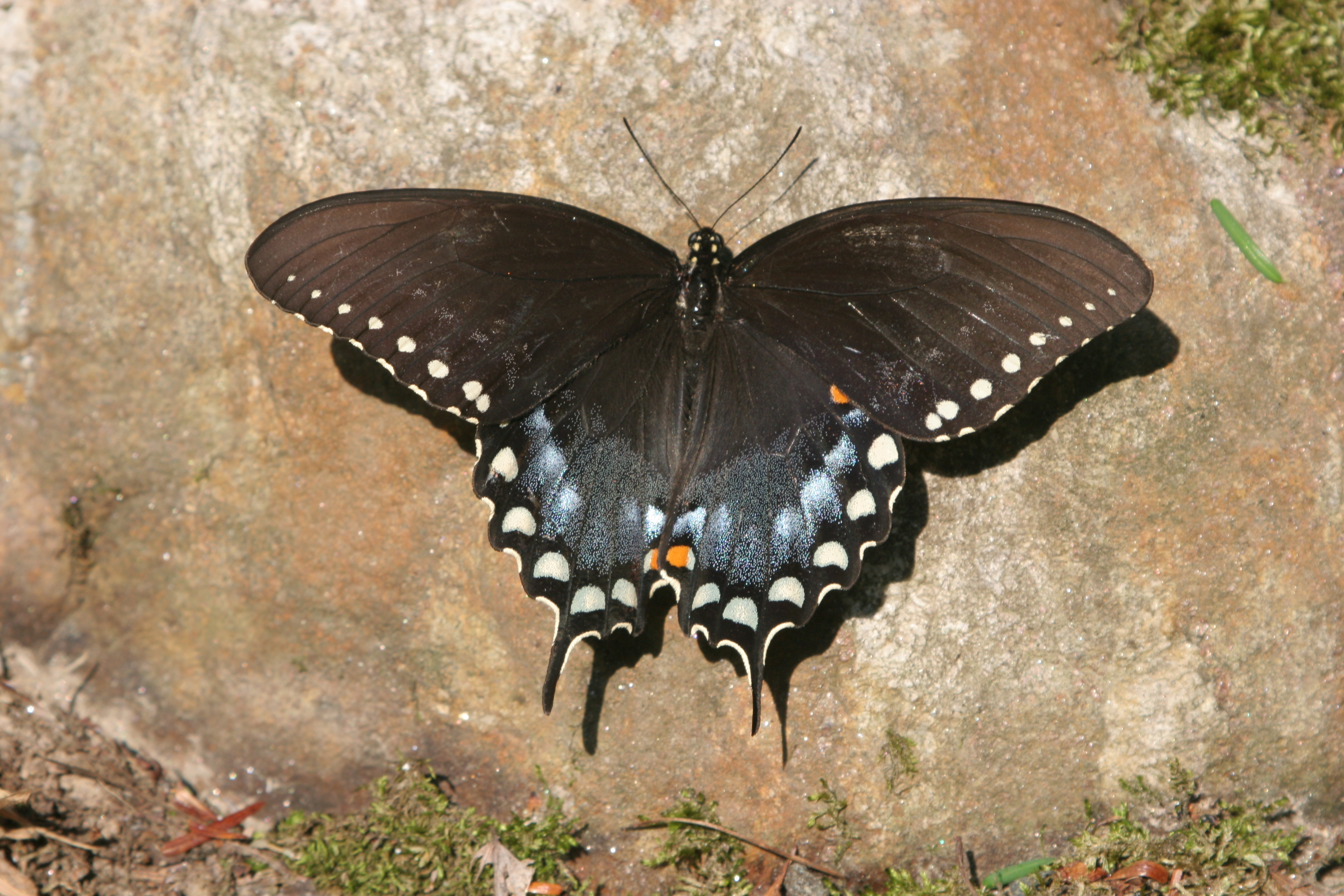
Male spicebush swallowtail

Spicebush is a favorite food plant of two lepidopterous insects: the spicebush swallowtail (Papilio troilus) and the promethea silkmoth (Callosamia promethea). It also supports the caterpillars of the cynthia moth, eastern tiger swallowtail, imperial moth, and the tulip tree beauty.

The larvae of the spicebush swallowtail are easily found inside leaves that have been folded over by the application of silk; small larvae are brown, resembling bird droppings, and mature larvae are green. The anterior of a larva has two large eyespots and resembles the head of a snake. Since one or more broods (generations) of spicebush swallowtails typically occur each year, spicebush is a useful plant for the butterfly garden, since the egg-laying females are strongly attracted to it. Promethea moth cocoons, if present, are obvious during the cold season after leaf drop, and resemble dead leaves still hanging from twigs. Neither of these insects is ever-present in sufficient quantities to defoliate a medium through large spicebush, although very small specimens may suffer even from a single caterpillar.

== Uses ==
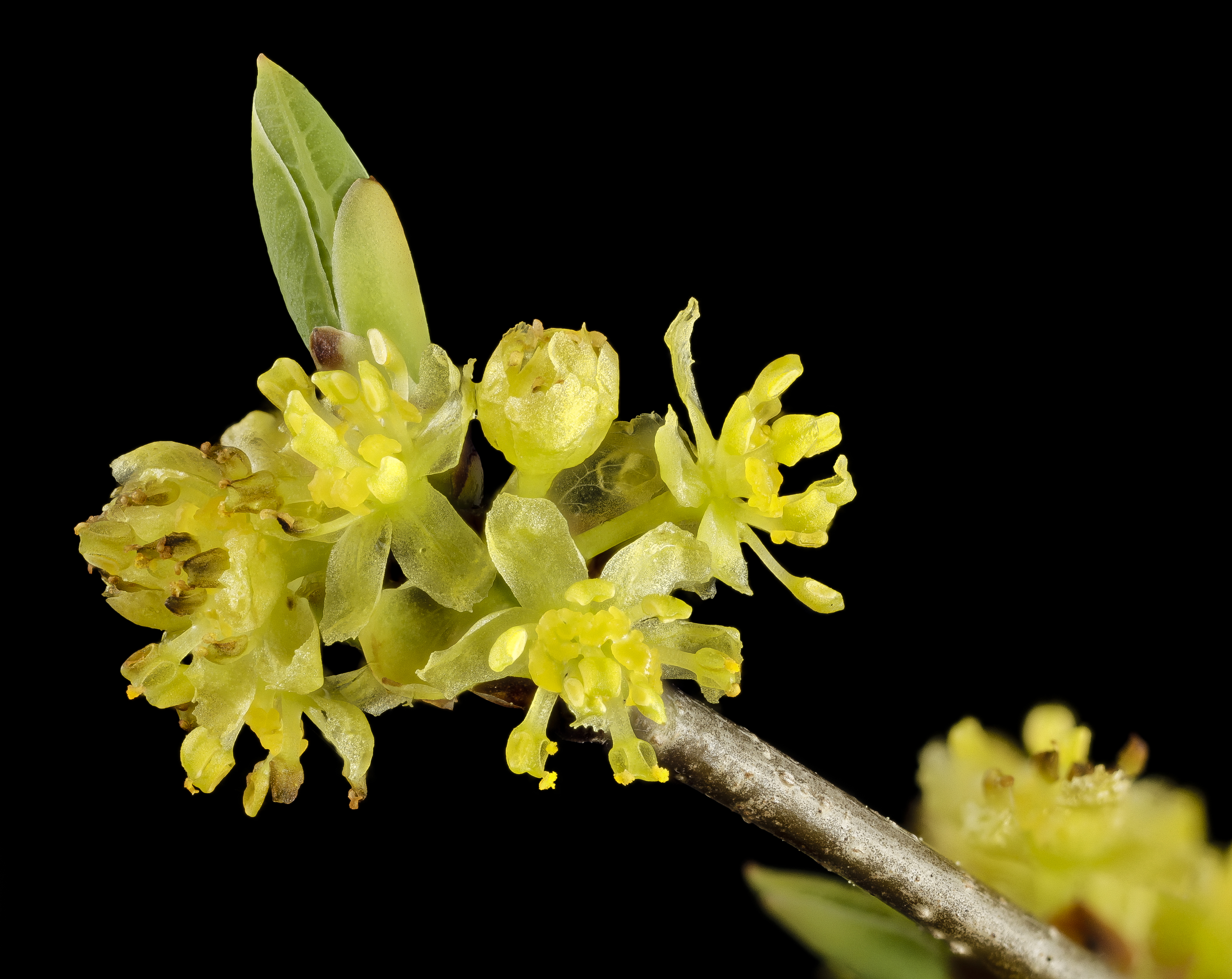
Male spicebush flowers

Due to its habit of growing in rich woods, early land surveyors used spicebush as an indicator of good agricultural land. The leaves, buds, and new growth twigs can be made into a tea. The fruits can be dried, ground, and used as an allspice substitute.

Native Americans, including the Cherokee, Muscogee, and Haudenosaunee, traditionally use the plant for treatments in multiple ailments.
