= Lindera akoensis =

Conservation status
- Least Concern (IUCN 3.1)

Scientific classification
- Kingdom: Plantae
- Clade: Embryophytes
- Clade: Tracheophytes
- Clade: Angiosperms
- Clade: Magnoliids
- Order: Laurales
- Family: Lauraceae
- Genus: Lindera
- Species: L. akoensis

Binomial name
- Lindera akoensis Hayata

Synonyms
- Benzoin akoense (Hayata) Kamik.

Species of flowering plant

Lindera akoensis, the Taiwan spicebush, is a species of flowering plant in the family Lauraceae, endemic to Taiwan, where it is found in thickets. A perennial shrub with fragrant foliage and showy flowers and fruit, it reaches 8 to 10 ft (2.4 to 3.0 m) at maturity. It is hardy in USDA zones 8 and 9, and is recommended for hedges, borders, and cottage gardens in partial shade.
