= Johan Linder =

Swedish botanist and doctor

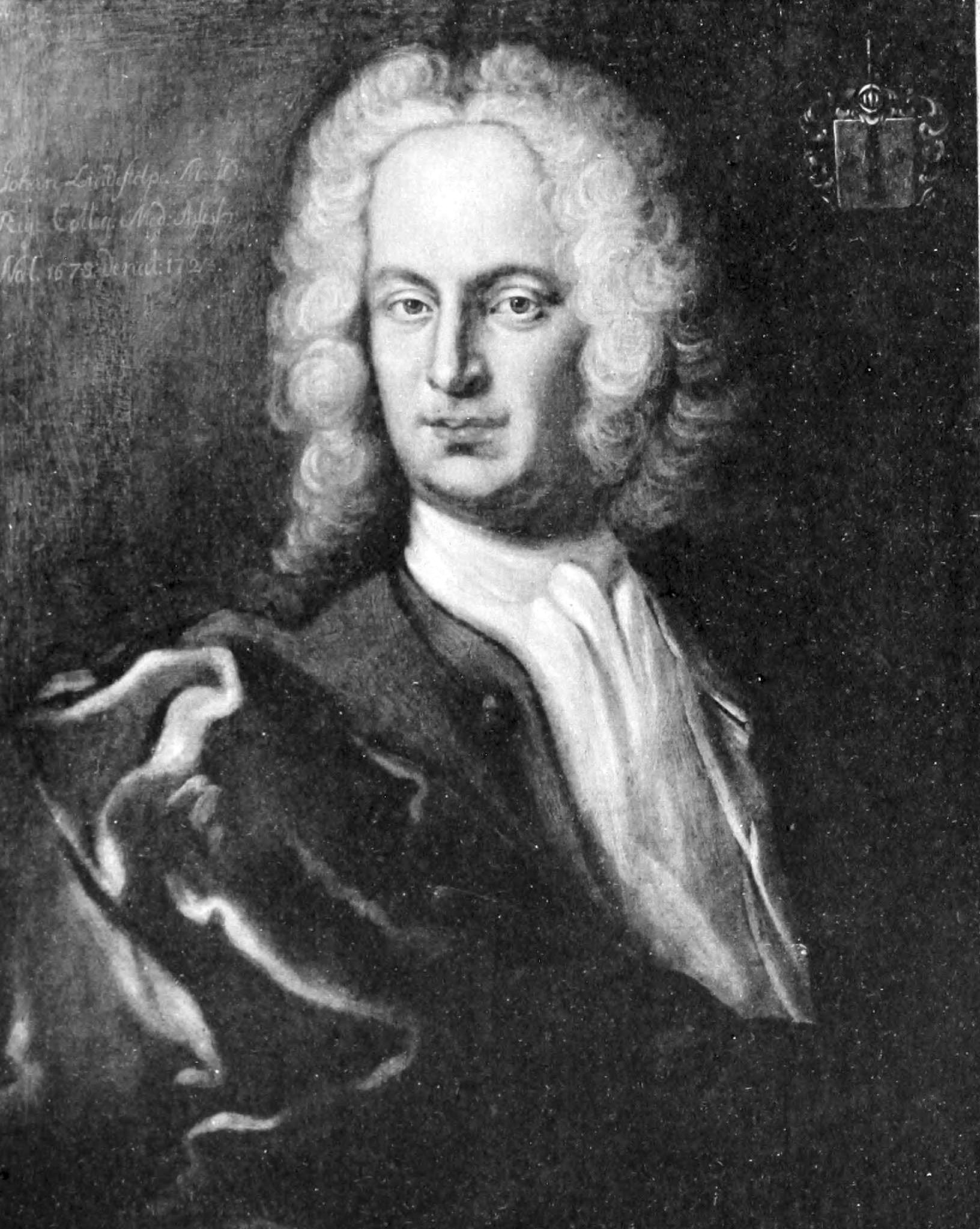

Johans Linder (1678 - March 24, 1724) was a Swedish botanist and medical doctor who was later ennobled as Lindestolpe. He wrote a book about natural dyes and their sources including plants, insects, and minerals.

He was born 1678 in Karlstad, Sweden and went to university in Uppsala with his first thesis titled De pomis hesperidum ("On the Apple of the Hesperides") in 1702. He defended a second thesis in 1705 titled De Foeda lue venerea dicta translated in 1713 into Swedish as Tankar om then smittosamma sjukom franzoser ("Thoughts about the very infectious French disease syphilis"). He encouraged other doctors to aid those inflicted with syphilis, rather than embarrass them with "moral preaching", although at the time there was little they could do to help.

He was appointed a member of the Medical College in 1719 the same year he was ennobled as Lindestolpe.

The genus Lindera, spicebush, is named for him, dedicated to him by Carl Peter Thunberg in 1783.

Linder married twice, first to Anna Öhrner and then to Eva Christina Cronhielm in 1720. He died March 24, 1724 in Stockholm.

== Books ==
- De Venenis In Genere, & in Specie Exercitatio, published in 1708 under the name Johannis Linder.
- Flora Wiksbergensis which was the forth book to be published on Swedish flora. It was first published in 1716 under the name Johan Linders.
- Liber De Venenis : In Ordinem Redactus Corollariis Animadversionibus Et Indice Illustratus 1739 under the name Lindestolpe Med. Doct.
