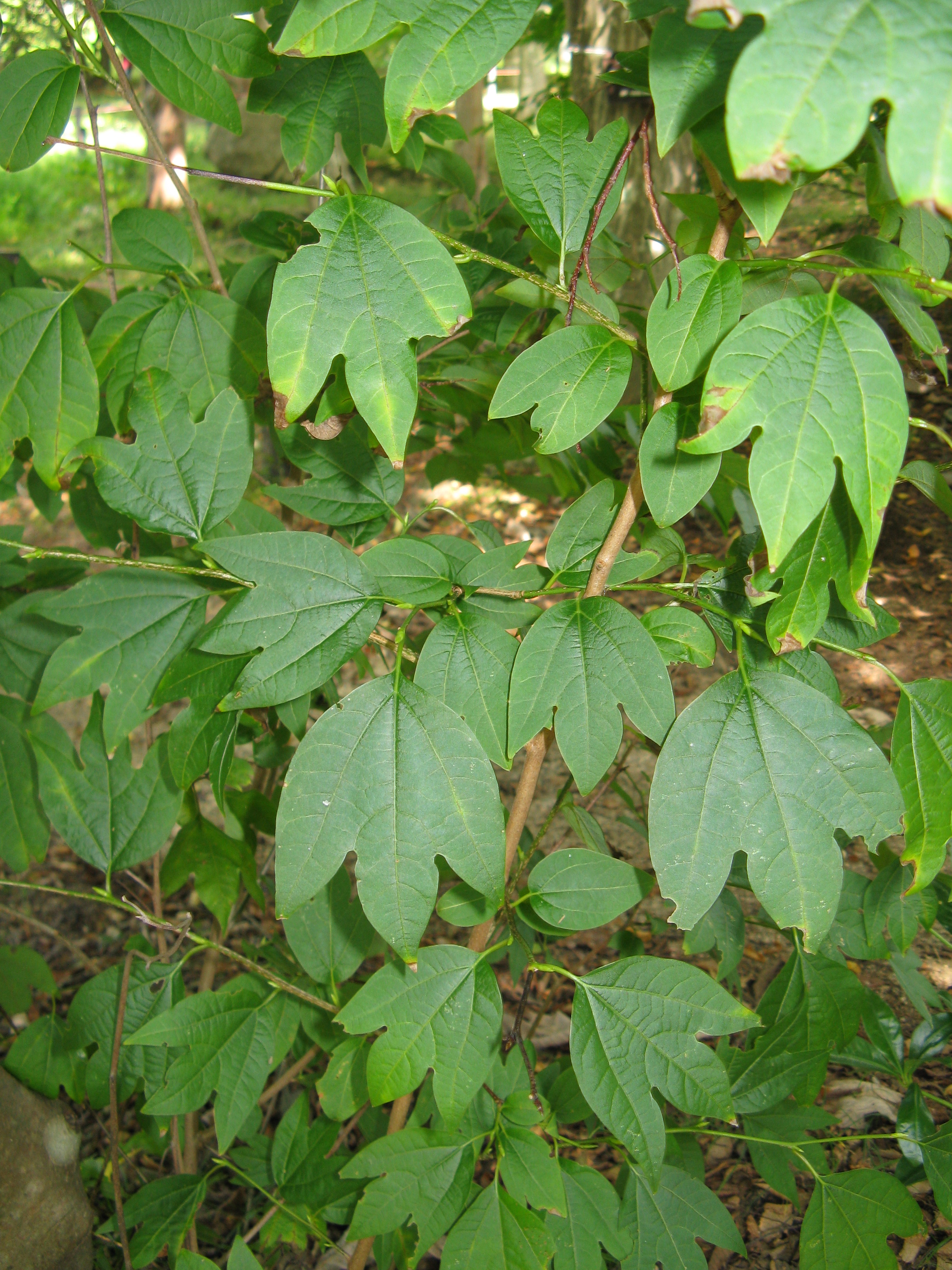

Scientific classification
- Kingdom: Plantae
- Clade: Tracheophytes
- Clade: Angiosperms
- Clade: Magnoliids
- Order: Laurales
- Family: Lauraceae
- Genus: Lindera
- Species: L. triloba

Binomial name
- Lindera triloba (Sieb. & Zucc.) Blume (1851)

Synonyms
- Benzoin trilobum Siebold & Zucc. (1846); Benzoin trilobum var. pilosum Koidz. (1935); Lindera officinalis Nakai (1911); Parabenzoin trilobum (Siebold & Zucc.) Nakai (1924 publ. 1925); Parabenzoin trilobum var. pilosum (Koidz.) Honda (1939); Parabenzoin trilobum f. pilosum (Koidz.) Sugim. (1961); Sassafras officinale Siebold (1830), nom. nud.

= Lindera triloba =

Species of flowering plant

Lindera triloba is a plant species belonging to the genus Lindera. It is endemic to Japan, and is called Shiro-moji in Japanese.

== Use ==
In Japan, the strong branch was used for walking sticks. The seed oil obtained by squeezing ripe fruit was used as fuel for lanterns. The leaves have a unique odor, and the essential oil can be extracted by hydrodistillation. The seedlings for gardening and garden trees are sold to enjoy the autumn leaves.

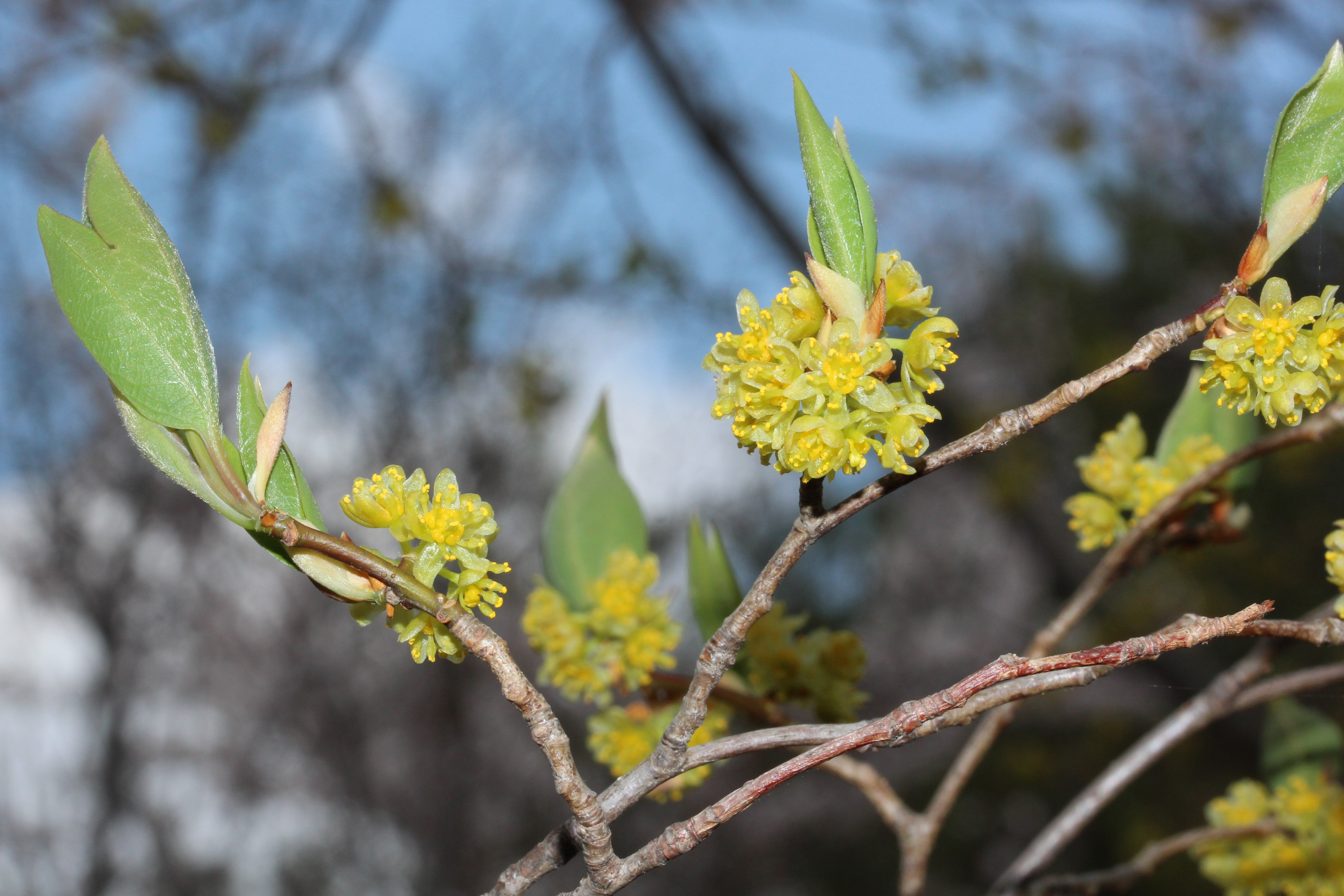
flower

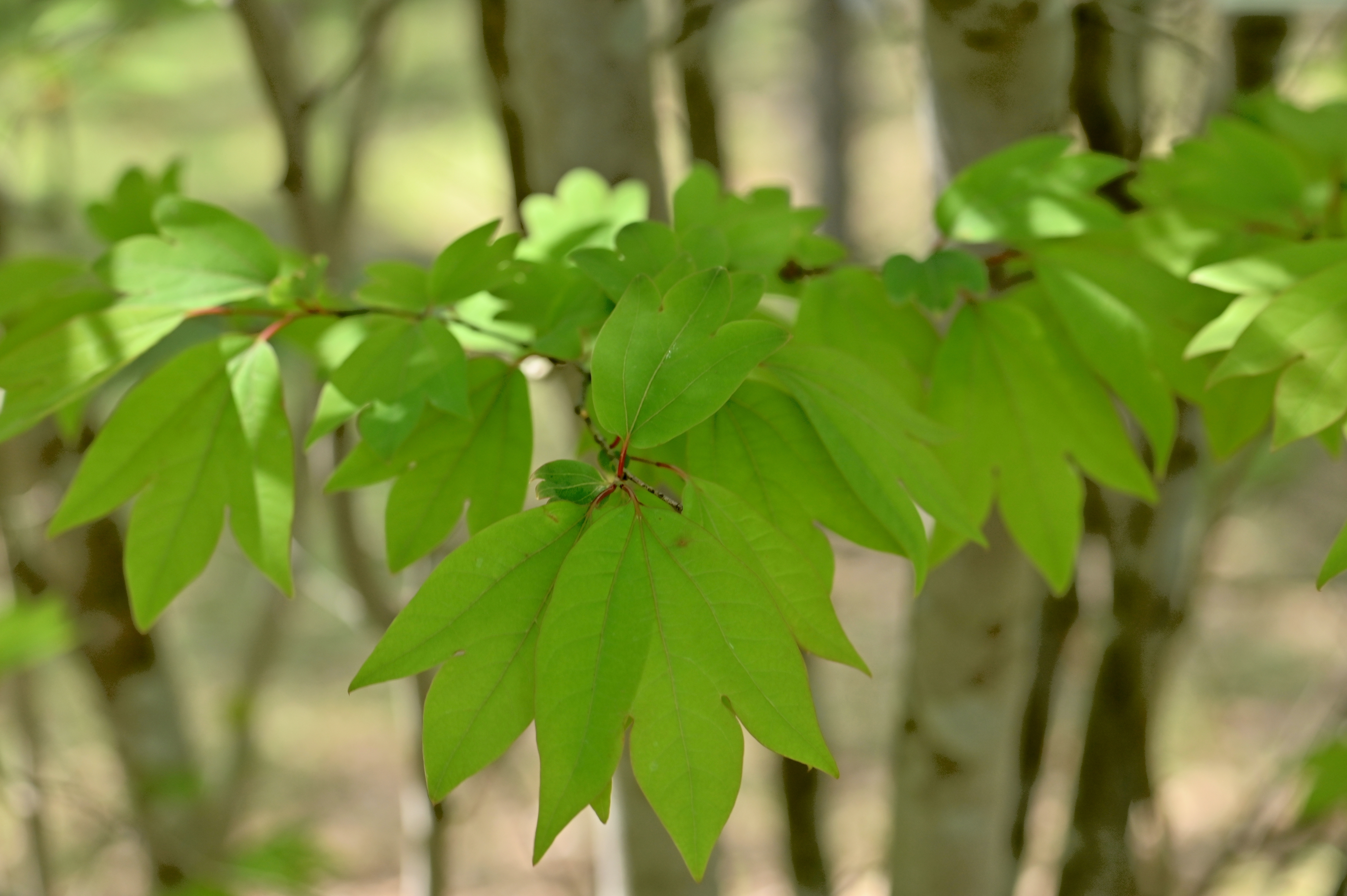
young leaves

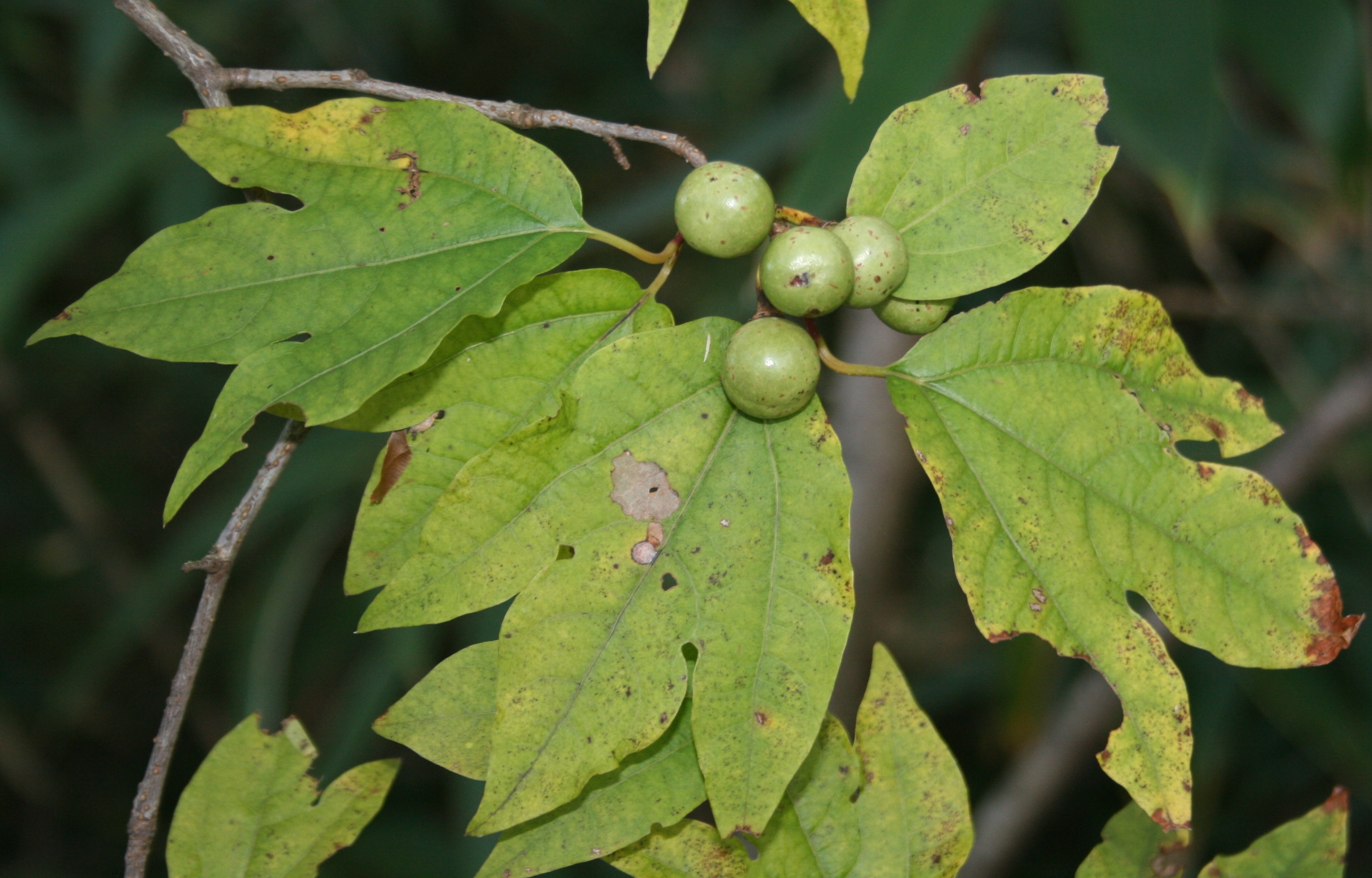
fruit

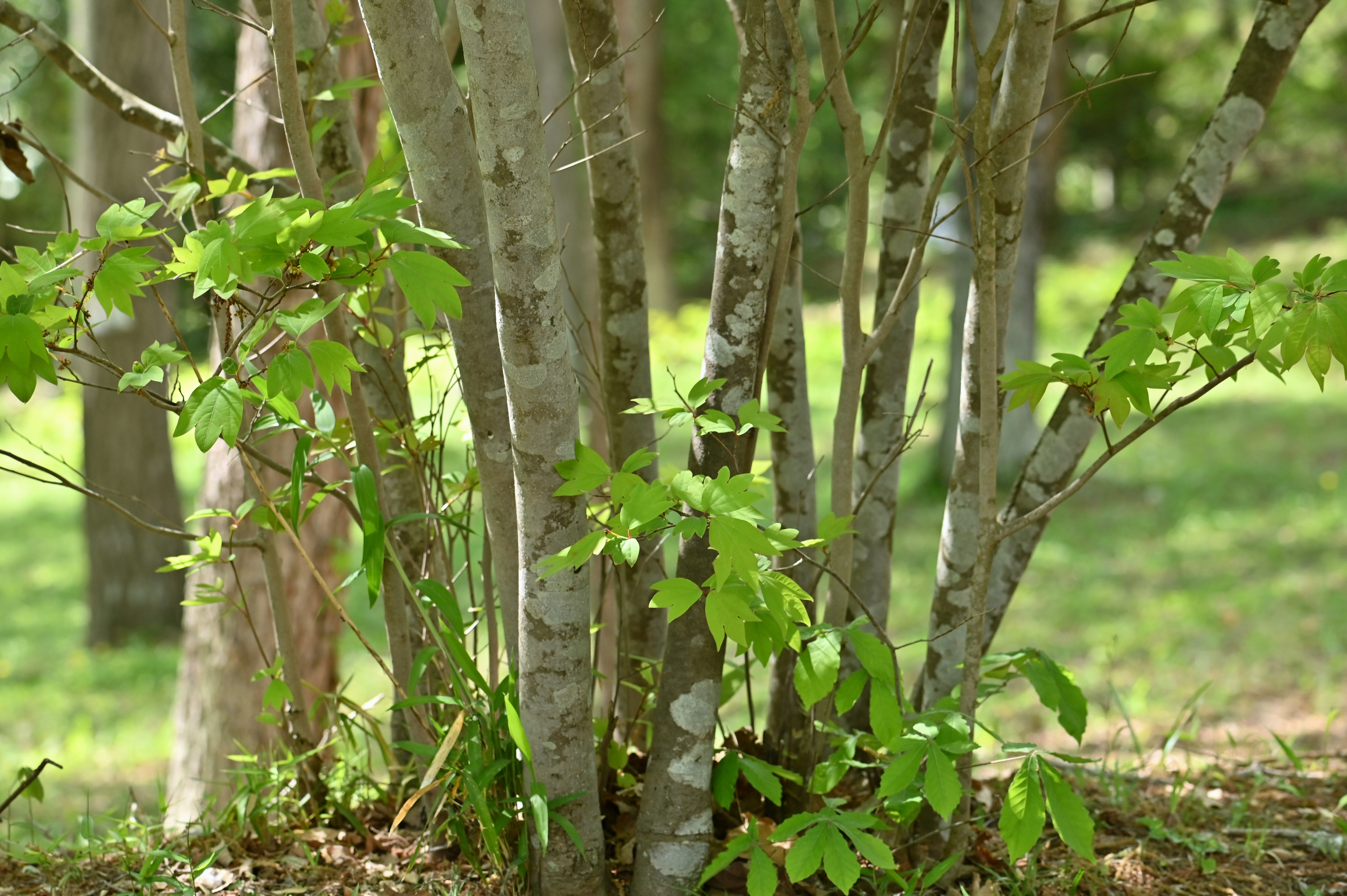
bark

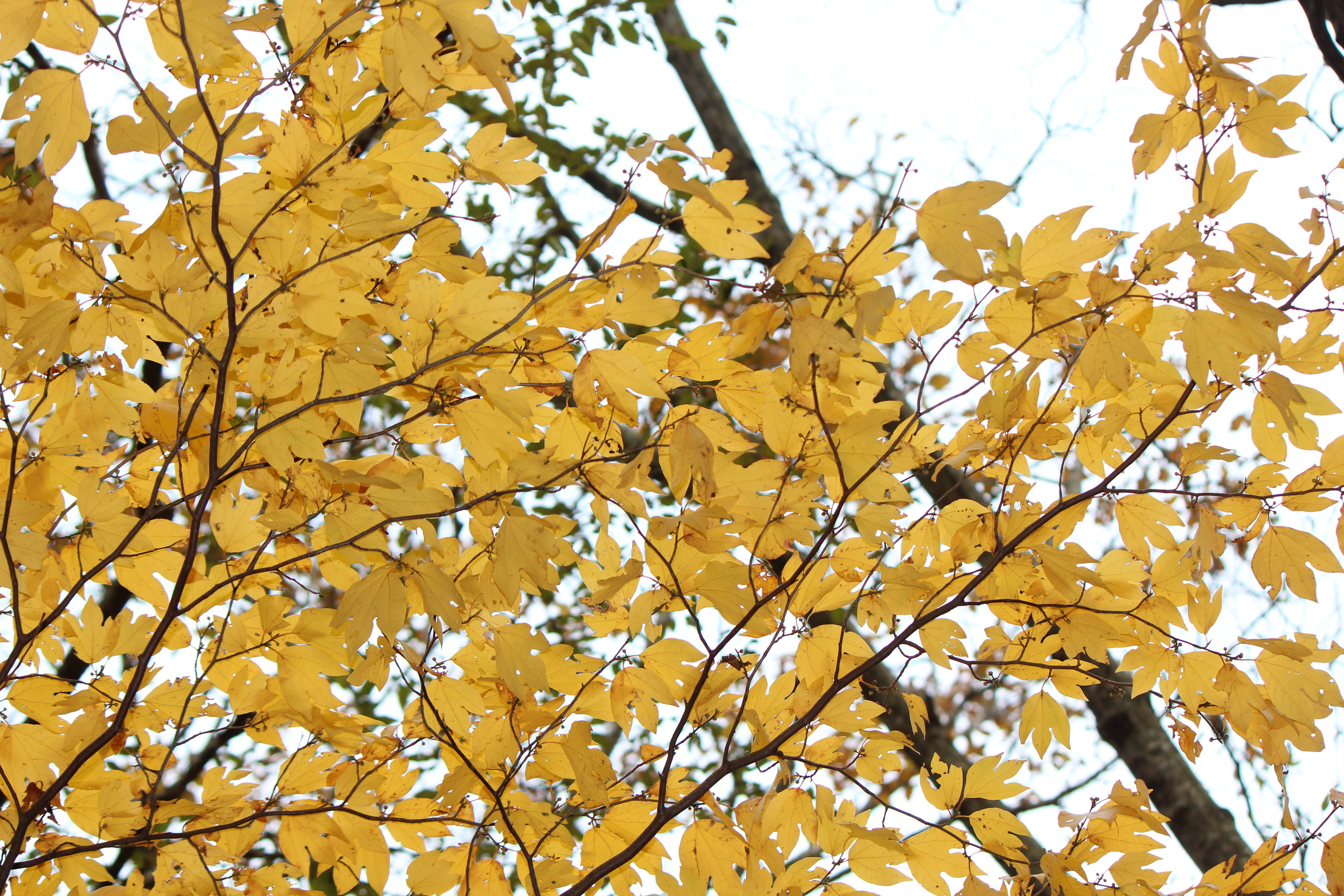
autumn leaves

== Biochemistry ==
Sesquiterpenes such as delobanone and acetoxydelobanone have been isolated from Lindera triloba.

The sesquiterpenes (α-Cadinol, δ-Cadinene etc.) were also found in the essential oils.
