= Lindera queenslandica =

- Inflorescence

Conservation status
- Least Concern (NCA)

Scientific classification
- Kingdom: Plantae
- Clade: Tracheophytes
- Clade: Angiosperms
- Clade: Magnoliids
- Order: Laurales
- Family: Lauraceae
- Genus: Lindera
- Species: L. queenslandica

Binomial name
- Lindera queenslandica B.Hyland

Species of flowering plant

Lindera queenslandica, commonly known as brown walnut, is a species of plant in the family Lauraceae native to northeast Queensland, Australia. It is a rainforest tree, first described in 1989, with a conservation status of least concern. It is the only species of Lindera in Australia.

== Description ==
Lindera queenslandica is a tree that grows up to 35 m (115 ft) tall with a trunk up to 90 cm (35 in) diameter. Buttresses are usually present in more mature trees. The leaves are simple (without divisions or lobes) and are generally about 14 cm (5.5 in) long and 6 cm (2.4 in), with 6–11 pairs of lateral veins. Both side are glossy green, the underside paler than the top. The midrib is flush with the upper surface, domatia are absent and the petiole averages about 30 mm (1.2 in) long.

The inflorescence is umbellate, emerging from the leaf axils, with 9–15 flowers per umbel. Flowers are creamy green and scented, and they have neither petals nor sepals. The fruit is a red or black drupe, almost spherical, measuring about 14 mm (0.55 in) wide and long. It contains a single brown seed about 9 mm (0.4 in) diameter.

This species is dioecious, meaning that male and female flowers are borne on separate plants.

== Distribution ==
It is found in Queensland from northern Cape York Peninsula as far south as the Ingham area. It grows in rainforest on various soil types, at altitudes from sea level to about 1,000 m (3,300 ft).

== Conservation ==
This species has been assessed as least-concern by the Queensland Government under its Nature Conservation Act.
