= Obtusilic acid =

Names
- IUPAC name (Z)-dec-4-enoic acid
- Other names 4-Decenoic acid

Identifiers
CAS Number	505-90-8
3D model (JSmol)	Interactive image
ChEBI	CHEBI:32380
ChemSpider	4471776
ECHA InfoCard	100.007.295
EC Number	208-024-5
PubChem CID	5312351
UNII	6PR4L1KTAZ
CompTox Dashboard (EPA)	DTXSID001315543
- InChI: InChI=1S/C10H18O2/c1-2-3-4-5-6-7-8-9-10(11)12/h6-7H,2-5,8-9H2,1H3,(H,11,12)/b7-6- Key: XKZKQTCECFWKBN-SREVYHEPSA-N
- SMILES: CCCCC/C=C\CCC(=O)O

Properties
Chemical formula	C_{10}H_{18}O_{2}
Molar mass	170.252 g·mol^{−1}
- Except where otherwise noted, data are given for materials in their standard state (at 25 °C [77 °F], 100 kPa). Infobox references

Obtusilic acid is a linear fatty acid composed of 10 carbon atoms, with one double bond in the position 4=5 in cis-configuration. This is an omega-6 acid of little nutritional interest with abbreviated notation 10:1 (n-6).

== Discovery ==
The acid was initially isolated in the seed oil of Lindera obtusiloba, from which it takes its common name, in 1937 by the Japanese scientist Toyama and confirmed in the same year by Saburo Komori and Sei-ichi Ueno.

== Natural occurrence ==
Lindera obtusiloba oil, Tohaku in Korean, which contains about 4% obtusilic acid, was an oil that Koreans applied to their hair. Obtusilic acid has been isolated from only a few other plants of the family Lauraceae: Lindera praecox (≈5%), Litsea auriculata (≈4%), Lindera citriodora (≈3%).

== Physical properties ==
At room temperature, the acid forms a liquid that boils at 148–150 °C at 13 mmHg. Between 4 °C and 20 °C, it has a density of 0.9197 g/cm³ and a refractive index of 1.4497 at 20 °C. The acid is soluble in benzene and diethyl ether.

== Health effects ==
An increase in obtusilic acid in human blood and organs has been associated with acyl-CoA dehydrogenase deficiency.
