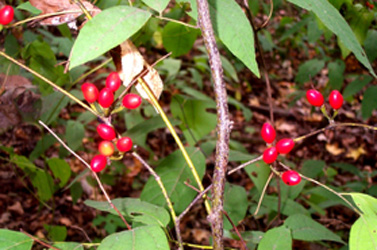

Conservation status
- Vulnerable (NatureServe)

- Endangered (ESA)

Scientific classification
- Kingdom: Plantae
- Clade: Tracheophytes
- Clade: Angiosperms
- Clade: Magnoliids
- Order: Laurales
- Family: Lauraceae
- Genus: Lindera
- Species: L. melissifolia

Binomial name
- Lindera melissifolia (Walter) Blume
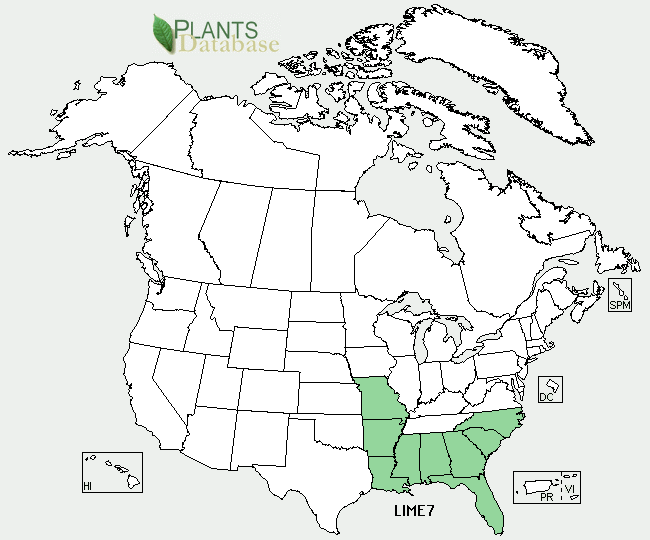
- Natural range in North America

Synonyms
- Benzoin melissifolium (Walter) Nees; Benzoin melissaefolium (Walter) Nees; Lindera melissaefolia (Walter) Blume; Laurus melissifolia Walter; Laurus melissaefolia Walter 1788

= Lindera melissifolia =

Pondberry

Species of shrub

Lindera melissifolia, common name pondberry or southern spicebush, is a stoloniferous, deciduous, aromatic shrub in the laurel family. This endangered species is native to the southeastern United States, and its demise is associated with habitat loss from extensive drainage of wetlands for agriculture and forestry. Restoration efforts are currently being conducted.

== Description ==
Form: Pondberry occurs in dense thickets with erect or ascending shoots up to 2 m (6.6 ft) tall and few branches; stems are connected underground by stolons. Thickets of female plants tend to be smaller than those of males and are sometimes absent from populations. Die-back of stems is a fairly common occurrence.

Foliage: The drooping, alternate leaves are oblong-elliptic to narrowly ovate, 5–16 cm (2.0–6.3 in) long, 2–6 cm (0.8–2.4 in) wide, and tend to be strongly tapered to a point at the tip. Undersides are strongly net-veined and covered with short, soft hairs. When crushed, the leaves strongly resemble sassafras (Sassafras albidum) in fragrance. Foliage is deciduous.

Flowers: Stems flower after two to four years of growth. Male and female flowers, each 5–6 mm (0.20–0.24 in) across, are produced on different plants (dioecious). Flowers appear before the leaves (February to mid-March) in tight, stalkless clusters. The petal-like tepals are pale to bright yellow, oblong, and 2 mm (0.08 in) long. Male flowers occur in dense clusters, with 9-12 stamens surrounded by two whorls of tepals. Female flowers are less conspicuous, with fewer flowers per cluster and a single pistil surrounded by two whorls of tepals; the outer whorl is petal-like and the inner whorl is reduced to nectar-producing scales. Flowers remain open for about 1 week making thickets conspicuous. Flowers are thought to be insect pollinated. Late season frosts occasionally damage flowers, resulting in reduced fruit set.

Fruit: A bright red, single-seeded drupe, ellipsoid, 10–12 mm (0.4–0.5 in) long matures in late summer or fall (August to early October). Individual fruit stalks are 9–12 mm (0.4–0.5 in) long, 2.5–3 mm (0.10–0.12 in) thick, and appear swollen at the apex. Stalks persist beyond fruit fall; their presence indicates the plant's sex and past level of fruit production. Fruit production is highly variable from year-to-year, ranging from 0 to 150 fruit per stem.

== Habitat and range ==
Pondberry occurs in shallow depression ponds in wetland habitats with hydric soils, along margins of cypress ponds, and in seasonally wet, low areas among bottomland hardwoods. At present there are some 36 populations in Alabama, Arkansas, Georgia, Mississippi, Missouri, North Carolina, and South Carolina. It has apparently been extirpated from Louisiana and possibly Florida. Most of these populations are located in Lower Mississippi Alluvial Plain, with the largest population being in the Delta National Forest in western Mississippi.

== Ecology ==
Pondberry has probably always been a rare species, and knowledge of its ecology is limited. In Mississippi, pondberry occurs in bottomland hardwood forests. In northeastern Arkansas and southeastern Missouri pondberry is found on the bottoms and edges of shallow seasonal ponds in old dune fields, but in southeastern Arkansas it occurs in low habitats along a river. In South Carolina the species occurs in areas with karst topography, around the edges of sinkholes, and in Georgia it occurs along the borders of sphagnum bogs. Sunlight at the different sites ranges from deep shade to almost full sun. Most pondberry colonies occur in light shade beneath a forest canopy, but a few grow in almost full sunlight. Pondberry appears to be able to occupy widely different habitats as long as its requirements for water are met. In open conditions, competition from other plant species may be a problem.

Many of the remaining populations consist only of male plants and are apparently the sprouts of a single individual. Habitat fragmentation severely affects dioecious species like pondberry because populations with plants of a single sex can only vegetatively reproduce. With significant habitat loss, plants become ever more isolated, lessening the likelihood that pollinators will travel from male to female plants.

== Propagation ==
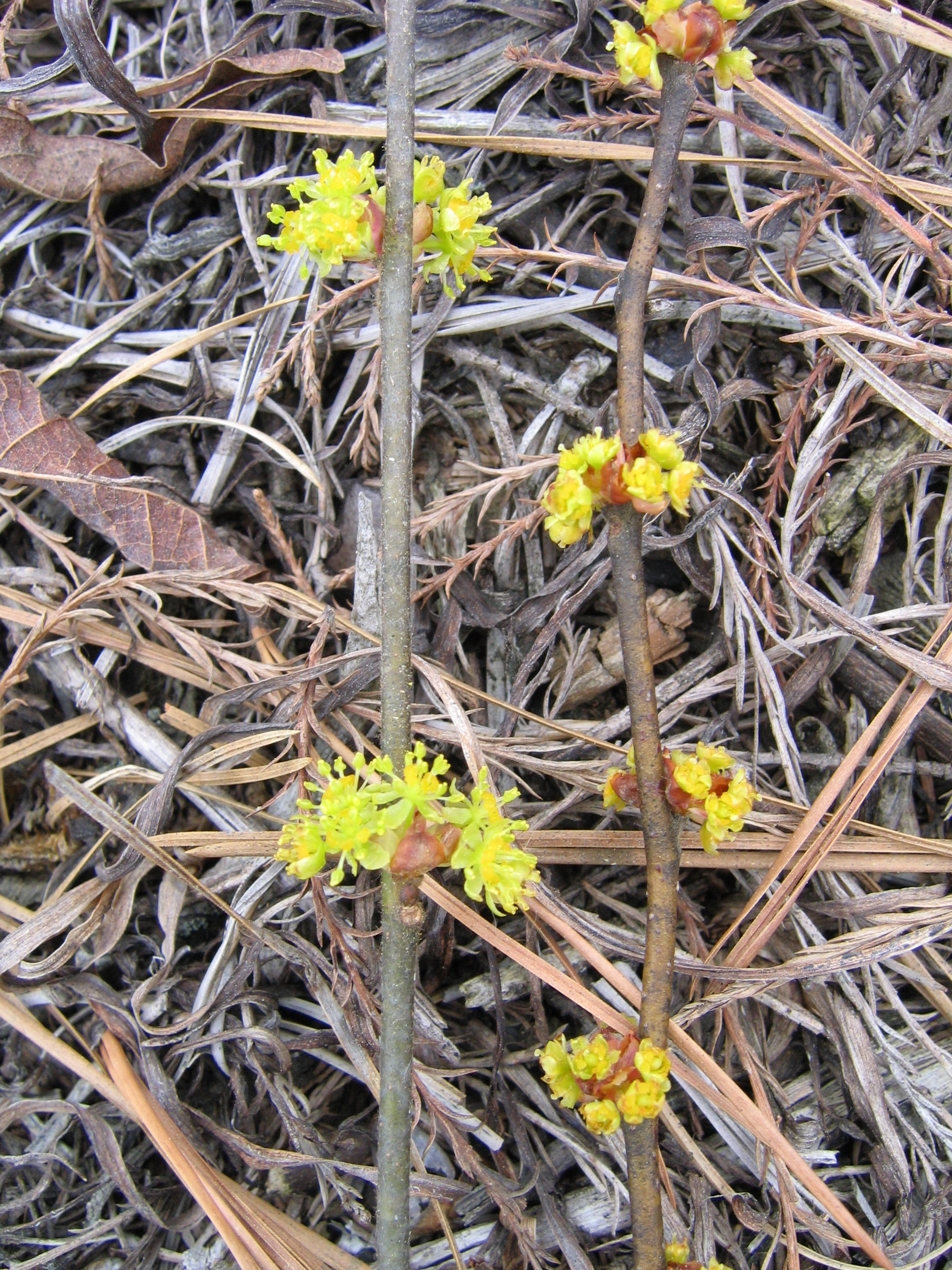
Pondberry flowers

Clones expand vegetatively through stolons, and this mechanism of vegetative reproduction is the principal way that colonies develop. Stems usually live 6 or 7 years, and when a stem dies it is usually replaced by a new stem that grows from the base of the plant. Thus, mature colonies often include some dead stems intermingled with numerous live stems.

Despite the regular production of mature fruit, virtually no seedlings of pondberry have been observed at any of the known sites. The cause of this apparent lack of natural reproduction is not currently known, but the consequences are clear—it severely reduces the species' chance for long-term survival. Sexual reproduction of pondberry is critical for long-range dispersal and genetic diversity.

Before modern flood control was imposed along the Mississippi River and its tributaries, historic floods may have been an important mechanism in fruit and/or seed dispersal over long distances or for creating suitable conditions for seedling establishment. Although the fruit of pondberry sinks in water after a short time, the seed with the pulp removed will float for a day or sometimes longer.

Characteristics of pondberry's fruit—the showy color, fleshy pulp, and its persistent on stems—suggest that animals, particularly birds, may be important dispersal agents. Of 82 bird species observed in the vicinity of pondberry thickets in fruit, only two species were observed to eat the fruit—hermit thrushes (Catharus guttatus) and northern cardinals (Cardinalis cardinalis). Of these, the cardinals destroyed the seed by crushing and is thus considered a seed predator. However, the hermit thrush swallows the whole fruit and later regurgitates the seed, indicating that it is an important seed disperser. The foraging habits of the thrush suggests that most of the seeds would be dispersed with 100 m of existing female colonies. Mammals may also be potential dispersers of pondberry seeds, including the raccoon (Procyon lotor) and opossum (Didelphis virginiana). Historically, the black bear (Ursus americanus) may have been important to seed dispersal.

Seed germination does not appear to be a deterrent to seedling establishment. Fairly high rates of germination have been reported under both controlled and field conditions. Removal of the fruit's pulp and sowing seeds into the soil favor germination. Under field conditions, germination of sown seeds has been observed to occur over a number of years suggesting some form of dormancy.

The artificial establishment of pondberry to new areas may be needed if the species is to recover. Plants have been successfully transplanted from existing colonies to suitable locations. The transplants seem to do well in some locations although survivorship and growth has been low in others. Both transplants and seedlings do well under cultivation in a nursery setting, which has been used to provide planting stock for creating new colonies in field locations.

== Uses ==
Pondberry fruit are eaten by hermit thrushes, northern cardinals, and perhaps other birds. Animals observed to consume pondberry seeds located on a cleared soil surface in a hardwood forest included: northern cardinal, brown thrasher (Toxostoma rufum), swamp rabbit (Sylvilagus aquaticus), armadillo (Dasypus novemcinctus), and gray squirrel (Sciurus carolinensis). Swamp rabbits have been observed browsing on stems.

The spicebush swallowtail (Papilio troilus) larvae feed on the leaves and roll themselves in a leaf making a tent. Leaf cutter bees (Megachilidae spp.) cut circular sections from the leaf margins, sometimes removing most of the leaf.

A vintage use of pondberry fruit in the rural South was as projectiles in toy pop guns constructed by children from hollowed-out elderberry (Sambucus canadensis) stems.

== Threats ==
A large part of pondberry habitat disappeared when forests were cut for timber or for conversion to agricultural fields, and as wetlands were drained. In some cases, wetlands were permanently flooded to construct lakes. Many of the existing colonies of pondberry are small, and occupy only a portion of the apparently suitable habitat.

There are indications that pondberry, which is in the Laurel family, is susceptible to laurel wilt (Raffaelea lauricola). This fungal disease is introduced into host plants by a non-native insect, the redbay ambrosia beetle (Xyleborus glabratus) and kills the plant by plugging the water-conducting cells of the afflicted individual, causing it to wilt and eventually die. There is no known cure for this disease, which has quickly spread through other members of the laurel family (especially redbay, Persia borbonia) from the coast of South Carolina inland towards the native habitat of pondberry.

== Restoration ==
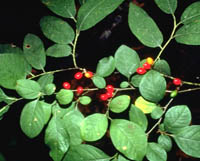

Pondberry was listed as endangered in 1986. The U.S. Fish and Wildlife Service's restoration plan states: existing pondberry populations should be protected from forestry and agricultural management actions and protected from grazing and browsing animals; searches for new populations should be continued; areas where pondberry has not been located but provide suitable habitat should be protected; and, new populations should be established or reestablish extirpated populations at suitable sites.

A critical part of the restoration effort is to increase the knowledge about pondberry's ecology and reproduction. A team of researchers from the U.S. Forest Service's Southern Research Station are working with the U.S. Army Corps of Engineers and the U.S. Fish and Wildlife Service to learn as much as they can about the biology and ecology of pondberry. Scientists are investigating the role of flooding and light availability on pondberry at a large-scale impoundment facility, and they have set up controlled experiments to study competition, seed germination, seed storage, and seed persistence in the soil seed bank. An integrated approach is being used to learn more about pondberry's ecology, insect predators, fungal pathogens, physiological responses to light availability and flooding, population genetics, seed physiology, and seed dispersal.
