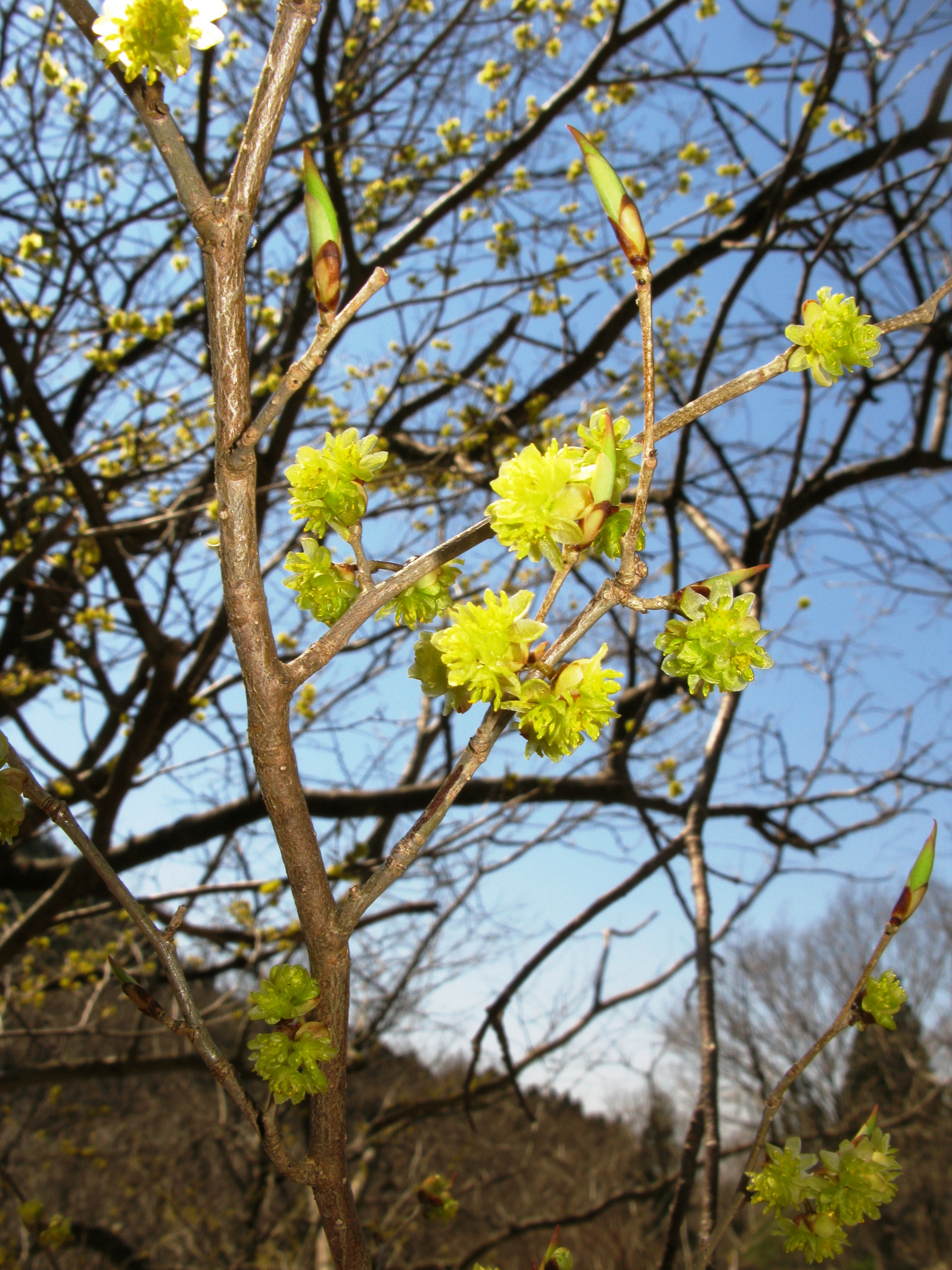
- Male flowers
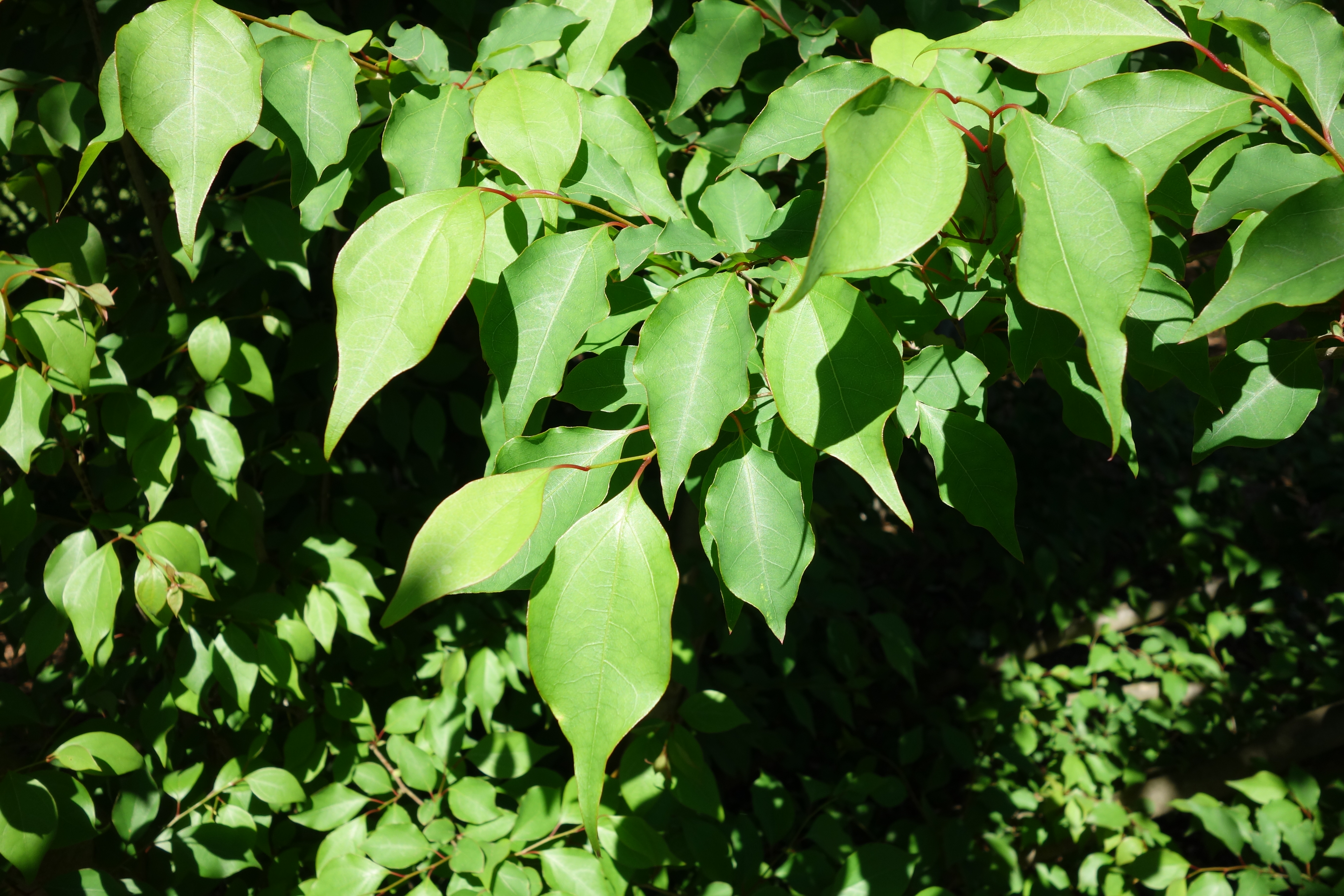
- Foliage

Scientific classification
- Kingdom: Plantae
- Clade: Tracheophytes
- Clade: Angiosperms
- Clade: Magnoliids
- Order: Laurales
- Family: Lauraceae
- Genus: Lindera
- Species: L. praecox

Binomial name
- Lindera praecox (Siebold & Zucc.) Blume

Synonyms
- List: Benzoin praecox Siebold & Zucc.; Lindera praecox f. pubescens (Honda) H.Ohba; Parabenzoin praecox (Siebold & Zucc.) Nakai; Parabenzoin praecox f. angustifolium Sugim.; Parabenzoin praecox var. oleopubescens Nakai; Parabenzoin praecox var. pubescens Honda; Parabenzoin praecox var. stipitatum Nakai; Parabenzoin praecox var. stipititoides Nakai

= Lindera praecox =

Species of plant

Lindera praecox, the February spicebush, is a species of flowering plant in the family Lauraceae, native to southern China, and Japan. A deciduous shrub typically 4.5 to 7.5 m (15 to 25 ft) tall, it is hardy to USDA Zone 8. In the wild it is found in thickets on the slopes of hills and mountains, and on the banks of streams and lakes. It is occasionally available from specialty nurseries.

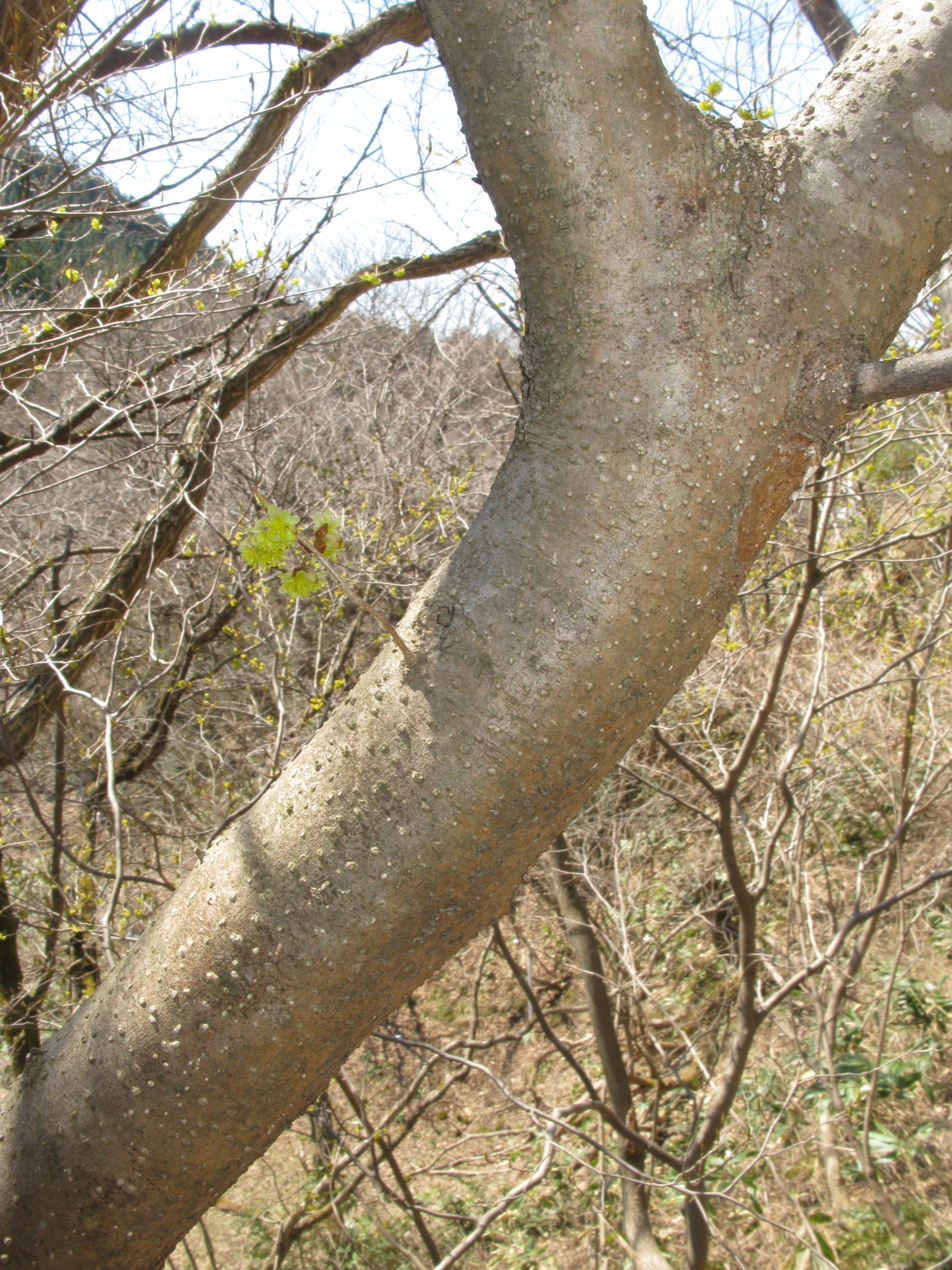
Bark is warty

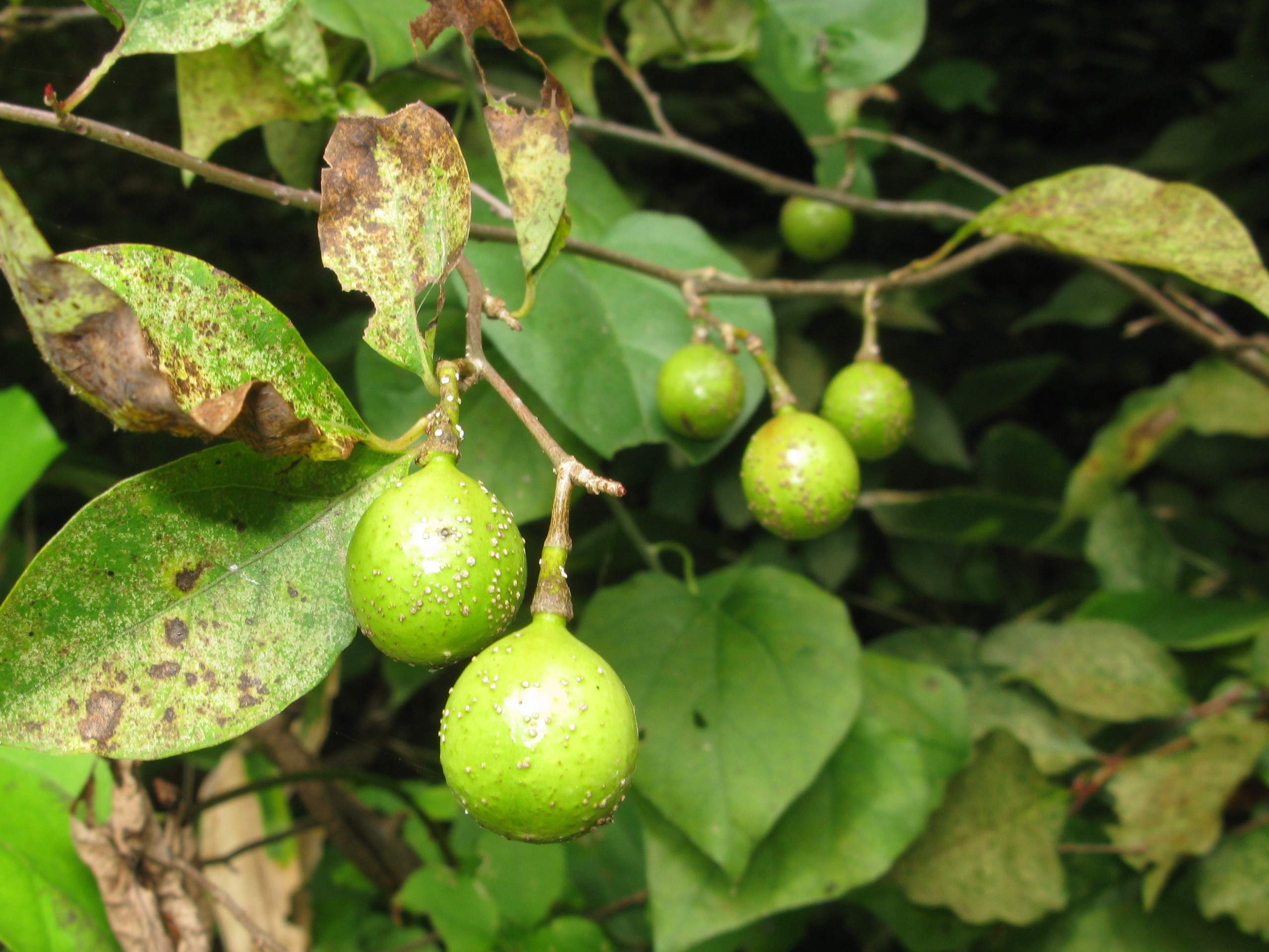
Fruit are also warty

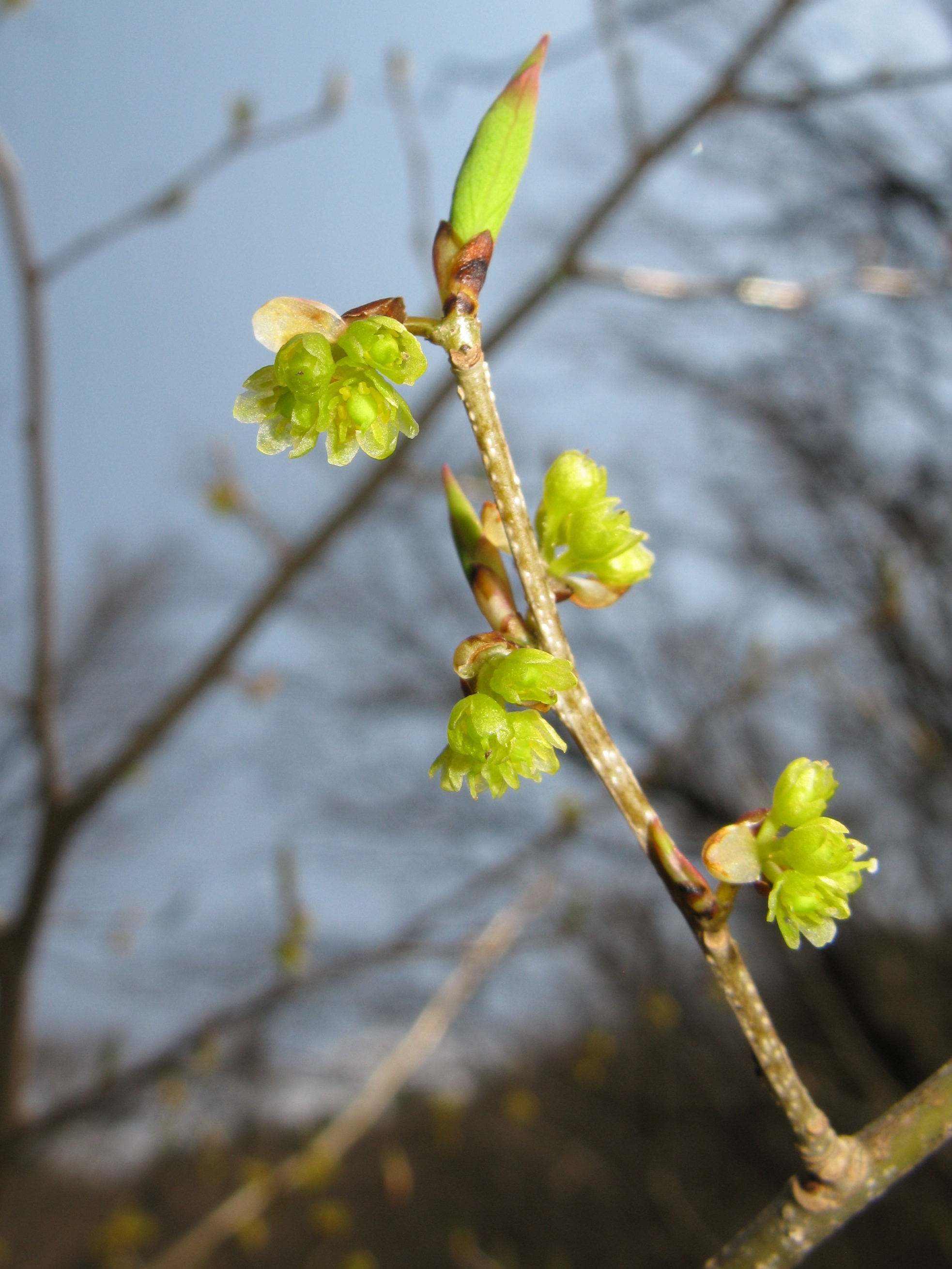
Female flowers

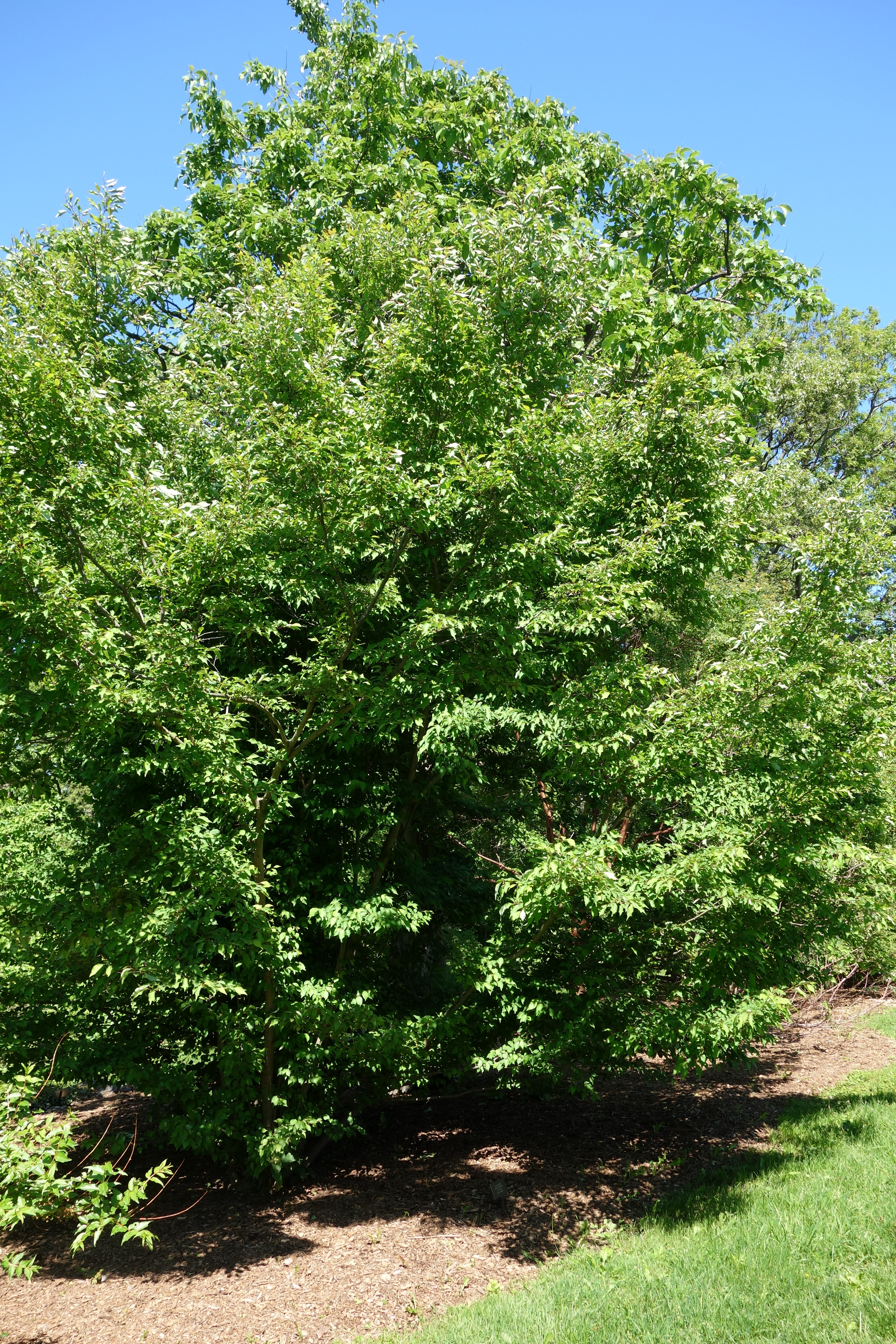
Habit

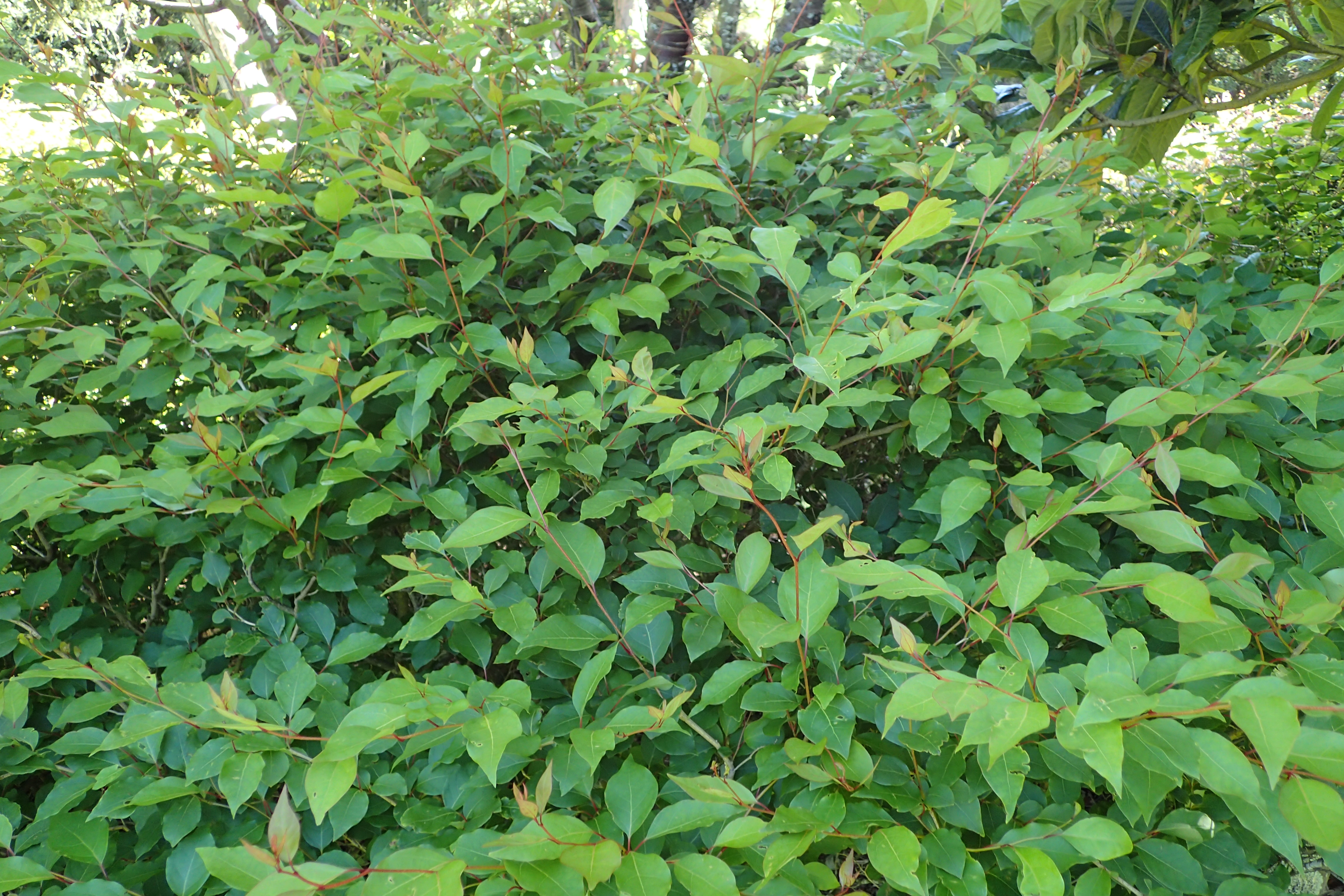
At Dunedin Botanic Garden

The plant is a source of obtusilic acid.
