= Lindera wrayi =

Conservation status
- Endangered (IUCN 3.1)

Scientific classification
- Kingdom: Plantae
- Clade: Tracheophytes
- Clade: Angiosperms
- Clade: Magnoliids
- Order: Laurales
- Family: Lauraceae
- Genus: Lindera
- Species: L. wrayi

Binomial name
- Lindera wrayi Gamble

Species of flowering plant

Lindera wrayi is a species of plant in the family Lauraceae. It is endemic to Peninsular Malaysia.
