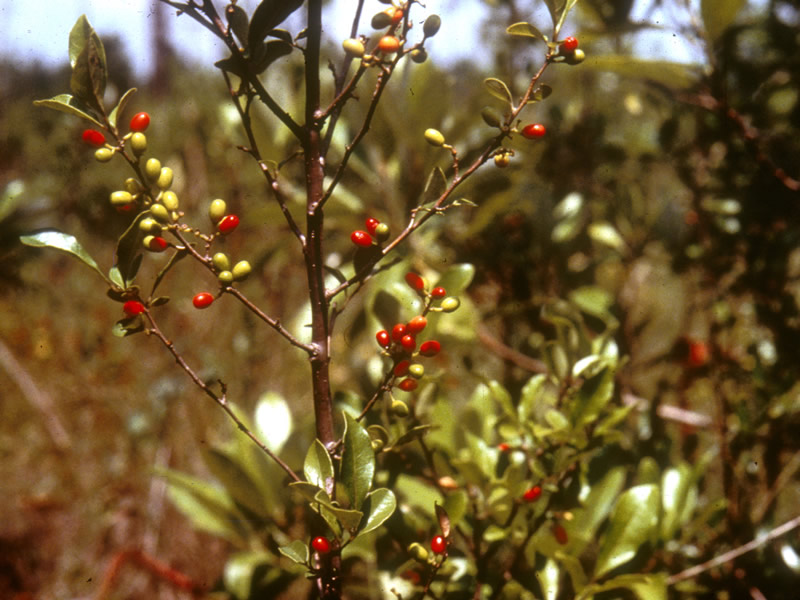
- In fruit

Conservation status
- Vulnerable (NatureServe)

Scientific classification
- Kingdom: Plantae
- Clade: Tracheophytes
- Clade: Angiosperms
- Clade: Magnoliids
- Order: Laurales
- Family: Lauraceae
- Genus: Lindera
- Species: L. subcoriacea

Binomial name
- Lindera subcoriacea Wofford, 1983

= Lindera subcoriacea =

Bog spicebush

Species of shrub

Lindera subcoriacea, the bog spicebush, is a plant species native to the southeastern United States from Louisiana to Virginia. It is a shrub that can reach up to 4 metres (13 ft) in height. Leaves are broadly elliptic, up to 8 cm (3.2 inches) long, and faintly aromatic when young. Flowers are yellow. Fruits are ellipsoid, deep red, about 10 mm (0.4 inches) long. It grows in acidic freshwater swamp forests in the Coastal Plain and Piedmont regions. In the northern portion of its range in the Carolinas and Virginia, L. subcoriacea is found only in the specialized stream pocosin habitat, while in the southern portion from Georgia onwards, it is found only in the wettest portions of the sphagnum bog habitat. As it is specialized and restricted to both of these very rare and unique ecosystems, L. subcoriacea is endangered due to habitat destruction and fire suppression. Only around 95 sites are known across this species' range to still sustain it, and most of these have only 1 to 5 genetically distinct individuals.
