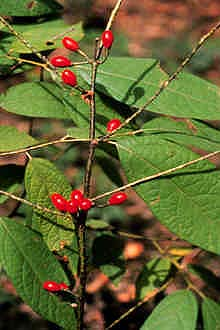
- Lindera melissifolia

Scientific classification
- Kingdom: Plantae
- Clade: Tracheophytes
- Clade: Angiosperms
- Clade: Magnoliids
- Order: Laurales
- Family: Lauraceae
- Genus: Lindera; Thunb.

Type species
- Lindera umbellata Thunb.

Species
- See text

Synonyms
- Aperula Blume; Benzoe Fabr.; Benzoin Nees; Calosmon J.Presl; Daphnidium Nees; Evelyna Raf.; Omphalodaphne (Blume) Nakai; Ozanthes Raf.; Parabenzoin Nakai; Polyadenia Nees; Sinosassafras H.W.Li

= Lindera =

Genus of flowering plants

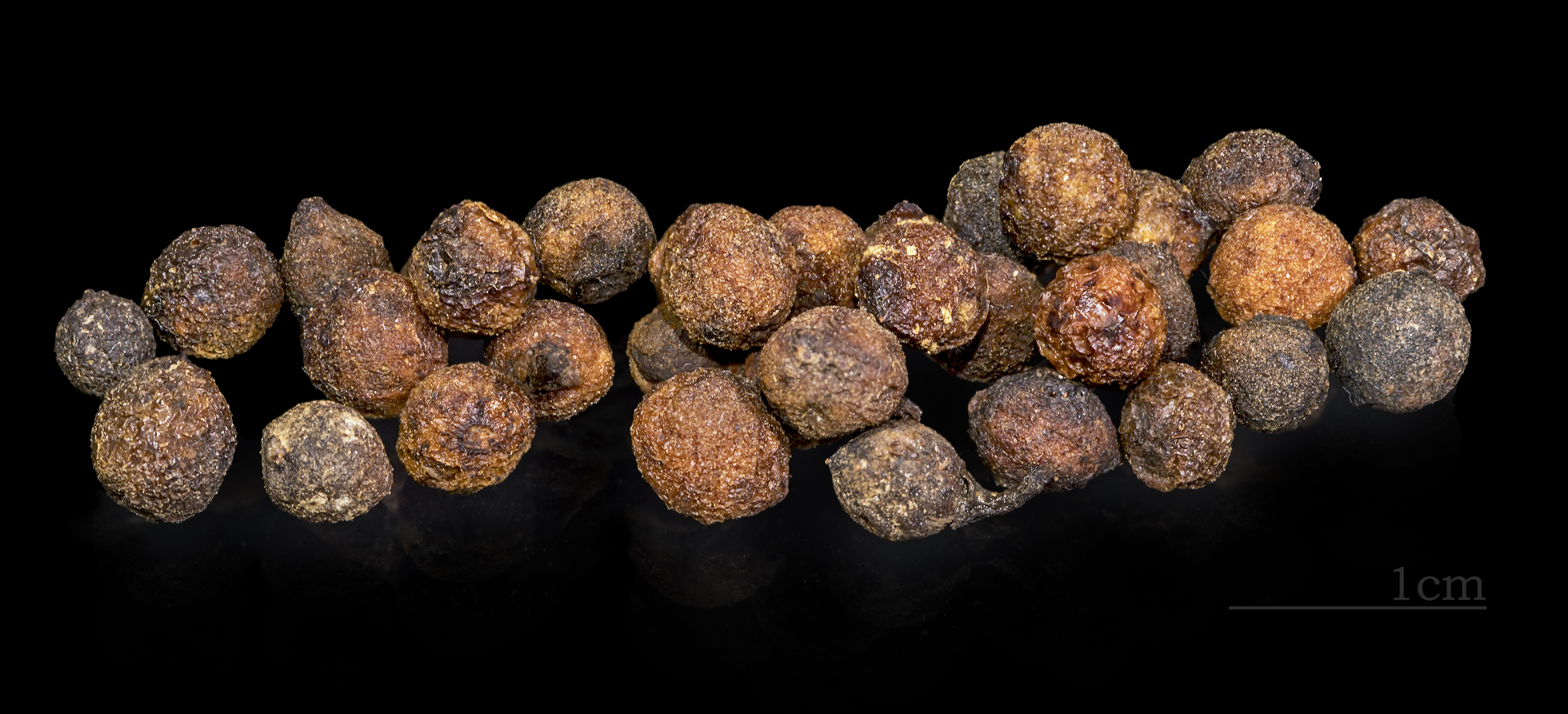
Dried fruits of Lindera neesiana used as spice (coll.MHNT)

Lindera is a genus of about 80–100 species of flowering plants in the family Lauraceae, mostly native to eastern Asia but with three species in eastern North America. The species are shrubs and small trees; common names include spicewood, spicebush, and Benjamin bush.

== Name ==
The Latin name Lindera commemorates the Swedish doctor Johan Linder (1676–1724).

== Description ==
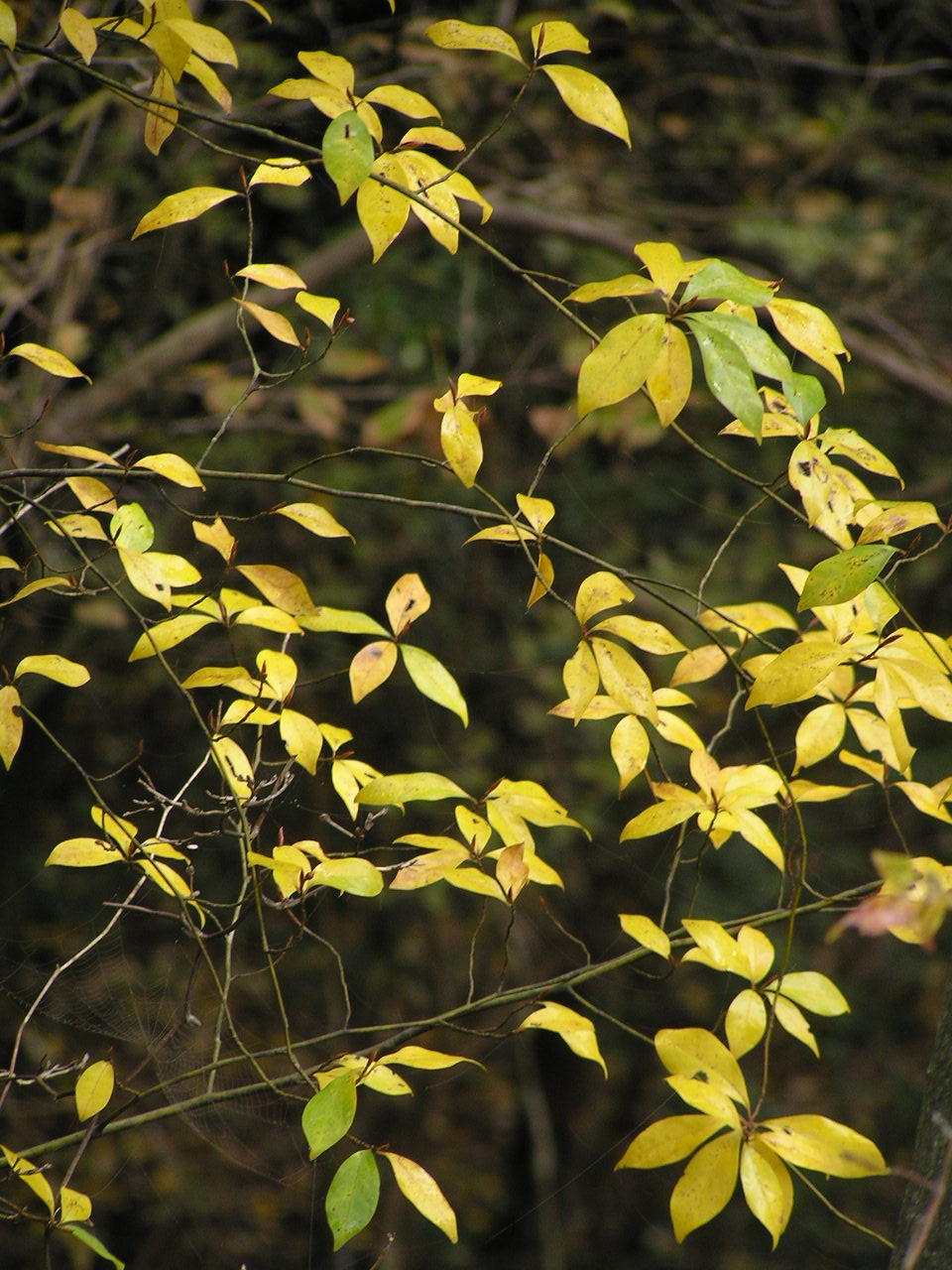
Lindera umbellata

Lindera are evergreen or deciduous trees or shrubs. The leaves are alternate, entire or three-lobed, and strongly spicy-aromatic. Lindera are dioecious, with male and female flowers on separate trees. The inflorescences are composed of 3 to 15 small flowers existing as pseudo-umbels. They are sessile or on short shoots. The flowers are from greenish to white, greenish-yellow, or yellowish, with six tepals arranged in a star shape. The male flowers have 9 to 15 fertile stamens; the innermost circle of stamens can be found at the base of the stamen glands. Usually the stamens are longer than the anthers, which in turn consist of two chambers and are directed inwards or sideways. The vestigial ovary is negligible or absent. The base of the flower is small and flat. The female flowers have a varying number of staminodes. Pollination is by bees and other insects. Lindera fruit have a hypocarpium at the base of the fruit, which in some cases forms a cup that encloses the bottom part of the fruit. The fruit is a small red, purple or black drupe containing a single seed, dispersed mostly by birds. Many species reproduce vegetatively by stolons.

== Ecology ==
The genus appears to be able to occupy widely different habitats as long as its requirements for water are met. Habitat fragmentation severely affects dioecious species like Lindera melissifolia (pondberry), because populations with plants of a single sex can only vegetatively reproduce. With significant habitat loss, plants become ever more isolated, lessening the likelihood that pollinators will travel from male to female plants.

Most are found on the bottoms and edges of shallow seasonal ponds in old dune fields, but in drier areas they occur in low riverine habitat. Most Lindera colonies occur in light shade beneath a forest canopy, but a few grow in almost full sunlight. In warmer areas they occur in bottomland hardwood forests.

The North American species of Lindera are relicts that originally were more common when the climate of North America was more humid, and they are not so widespread geographically as in the past.

The hermit thrush has been identified as a dispersal agent of seeds of L. melissifolia.

Lindera species are used as food plants by the larvae of some Lepidoptera species, including the engrailed and the spicebush swallowtail.

== Species ==
As of December 2025, Plants of the World Online accepts the following 94 species:

- Lindera aggregata (Sims) Kosterm.
- Lindera akoensis Hayata
- Lindera andamanica Chakrab., Lakra & Diwakar
- Lindera angustifolia W.C.Cheng
- Lindera annamensis H.Liu
- Lindera apoensis Elmer
- Lindera assamica (Meisn.) Kurz
- Lindera balansae Lecomte
- Lindera benzoin (L.) Blume
- Lindera bibracteata Boerl.
- Lindera bokorensis Tagane & Yahara
- Lindera bootanica Meisn.
- Lindera caesia Reinw. ex Fern.-Vill.
- Lindera caudata (Nees) Hook.f.
- Lindera chienii W.C.Cheng
- Lindera chunii Merr.
- Lindera citriodora (Siebold & Zucc.) Hemsl.
- Lindera communis Hemsl.
- Lindera concinna Ridl.
- Lindera cuspidata (Blume) Boerl.
- Lindera delicata Kosterm.
- Lindera densiflora (Meisn.) Boerl.
- Lindera doniana C.K.Allen
- Lindera erythrocarpa Makino
- Lindera flavinervia C.K.Allen
- Lindera floribunda (C.K.Allen) H.P.Tsui
- Lindera foveolata H.W.Li
- Lindera fragrans Oliv.
- Lindera glauca (Siebold & Zucc.) Blume
- Lindera gracilipes H.W.Li
- Lindera guangxiensis H.P.Tsui
- Lindera insignis (Blume) Boerl.
- Lindera kariensis W.W.Sm.
- Lindera kinabaluensis Kosterm.
- Lindera kochummenii de Kok
- Lindera kwangtungensis (H.Liu) C.K.Allen
- Lindera latifolia Hook.f.
- Lindera laureola Collett & Hemsl.
- Lindera limprichtii H.J.P.Winkl.
- Lindera longipedunculata C.K.Allen
- Lindera longistaminata (H.Liu) Dao
- Lindera lucida (Blume) Boerl.
- Lindera lungshengensis S.Lee
- Lindera macrophylla (Blume) Boerl.
- Lindera malaccensis Hook.f.
- Lindera megaphylla Hemsl.
- Lindera meissneri King ex Hook.f.
- Lindera melastomacea Fern.-Vill.
- Lindera melissifolia (Walter) Blume
- Lindera menghaiensis H.W.Li
- Lindera metcalfiana C.K.Allen
- Lindera montana Ridl.
- Lindera montanoides Kosterm.
- Lindera motuoensis H.P.Tsui
- Lindera myrrha (Lour.) Merr.
- Lindera nacusua (D.Don) Merr.
- Lindera neesiana (Wall. ex Nees) Kurz
- Lindera novoguineensis Kosterm.
- Lindera obtusiloba Blume
- Lindera pedicellata Kosterm.
- Lindera pentantha Koord. & Valeton
- Lindera pilosa Kosterm.
- Lindera pipericarpa (Miq.) Boerl.
- Lindera polyantha (Blume) Boerl.
- Lindera praecox (Siebold & Zucc.) Blume
- Lindera prattii Gamble
- Lindera pulcherrima (Nees) Benth. ex Hook.f.
- Lindera queenslandica B.Hyland
- Lindera racemiflora Kosterm.
- Lindera racemosa Lecomte
- Lindera reflexa Hemsl.
- Lindera reticulata (Blume) Benth. & Hook.f. ex Fern.-Vill.
- Lindera robusta (C.K.Allen) H.P.Tsui
- Lindera rubronervia Gamble
- Lindera rufa (Stapf) Gamble
- Lindera salicifolia (Blume) Boerl.
- Lindera sanjappae Bhaumik, M.K.Pathak & Chakrab.
- Lindera sericea (Siebold & Zucc.) Blume
- Lindera setchuenensis Gamble
- Lindera spicata Kosterm.
- Lindera subcoriacea Wofford
- Lindera supracostata Lecomte
- Lindera taiwanensis S.S.Ying
- Lindera thomsonii C.K.Allen
- Lindera tienchuanensis W.P.Fang & H.S.Kung
- Lindera tonkinensis Lecomte
- Lindera triloba (Siebold & Zucc.) Blume
- Lindera turfosa Kosterm.
- Lindera umbellata Thunb.
- Lindera varmae M.K.Pathak, Bhaumik & Chakrab.
- Lindera velutina H.Liu
- Lindera villipes H.P.Tsui
- Lindera wardii C.K.Allen
- Lindera wrayi Gamble
