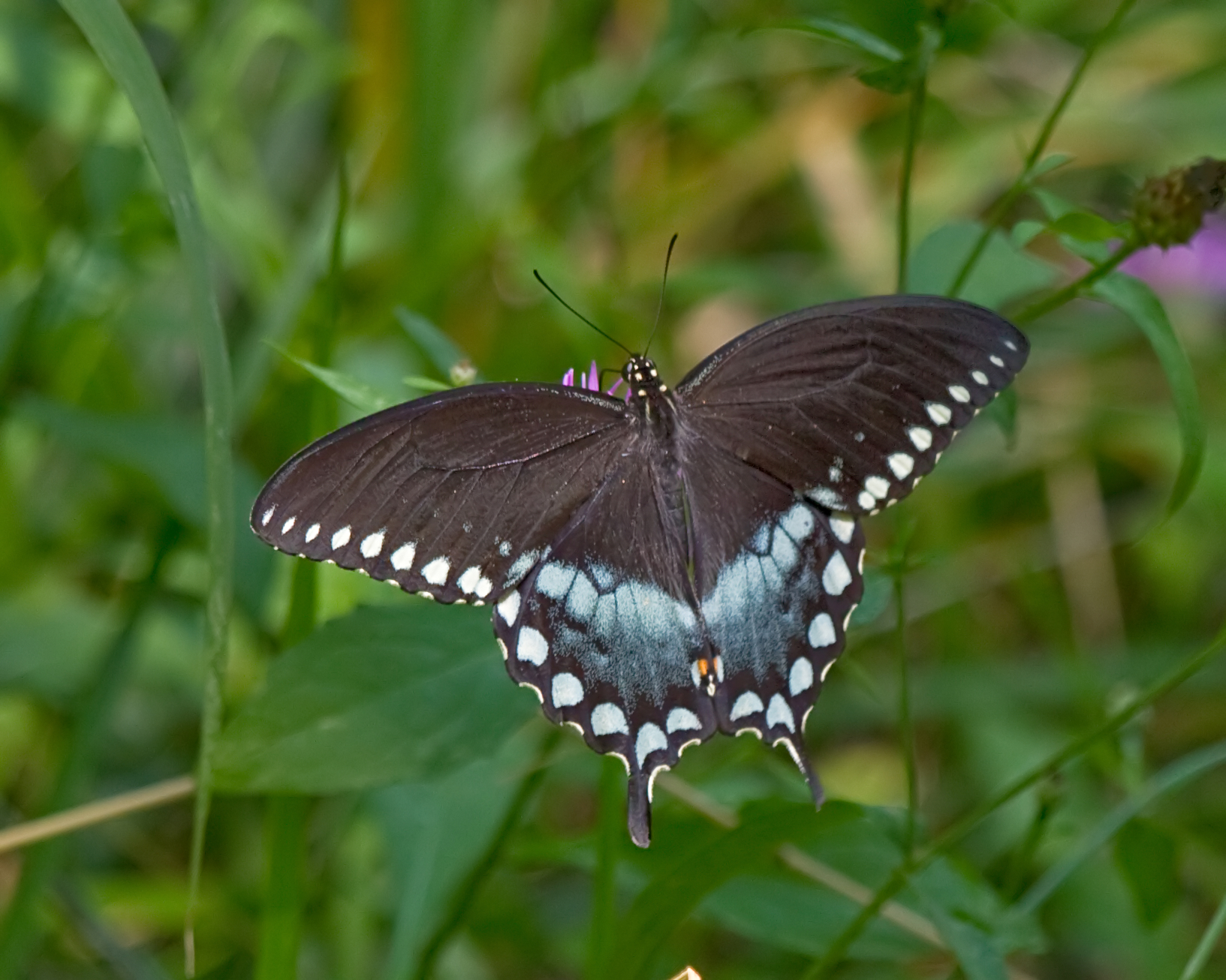

Conservation status
- Secure (NatureServe)

Scientific classification
- Kingdom: Animalia
- Phylum: Arthropoda
- Clade: Pancrustacea
- Class: Insecta
- Order: Lepidoptera
- Family: Papilionidae
- Genus: Papilio
- Species: P. troilus

Binomial name
- Papilio troilus Linnaeus, 1758

Subspecies
- P. troilus troilus; P. troilus ilioneus
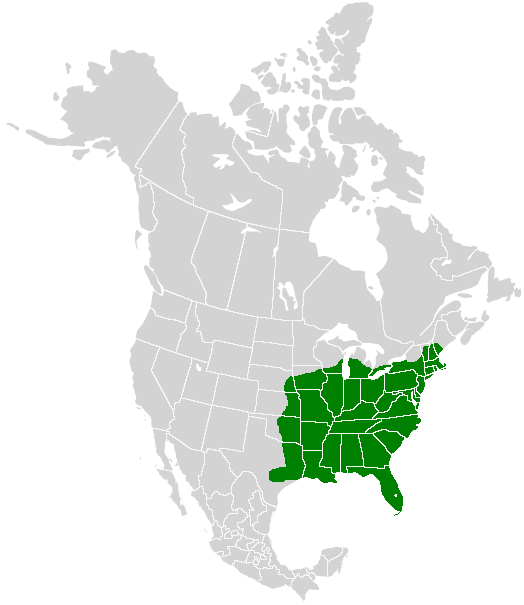

= Papilio troilus =

Spicebush swallowtail

Species of butterfly

Papilio troilus, the spicebush swallowtail or green-clouded butterfly, is a common black swallowtail butterfly found in North America. It has two subspecies, Papilio troilus troilus and Papilio troilus ilioneus, the latter found mainly in the Florida peninsula. The spicebush swallowtail derives its name from its most common host plant, the spicebush, members of the genus Lindera.

The family to which spicebush swallowtails belong, Papilionidae, or swallowtails, include the largest butterflies in the world. The swallowtails are unique in that even while feeding, they continue to flutter their wings. Unlike other swallowtail butterflies, spicebushes fly low to the ground instead of at great heights.

== Distribution and habitat ==
The spicebush swallowtail is found only in the eastern US and southern Ontario, but occasionally strays as far as the American plains states, Cuba, Manitoba and Colorado. While still larvae, spicebush swallowtails remain on the leaf of the plant on which they were laid. As adults, the butterflies do not limit their flight geographically and instead are motivated mostly by availability of water and nectar and mates within the species' range.

This primarily black swallowtail is normally found in deciduous woods or woody swamps, where they can be found flying low and fast through shaded areas. Females tend to stay in open plains, while males are typically found in swamp areas.

=== Papilio troilus troilus ===
The more widespread subspecies of spicebush swallowtail is prevalent throughout the Eastern United States, from New England to Wisconsin, west to Illinois, Wisconsin, North Dakota and Nebraska. It also abounds in Texas and Colorado. Temperature may be a limiting factor for the spread of P. t. troilus, as in experimental conditions, they do not fare well at or above 36 °C (97 °F) nor are they capable of flourishing at or below 14 °C (57 °F).

=== Papilio troilus ilioneus ===
The smaller subspecies of P. troilus is confined to the Southeastern coastal United States, namely throughout Florida and along coastal Georgia and in places in Texas.

== Description ==
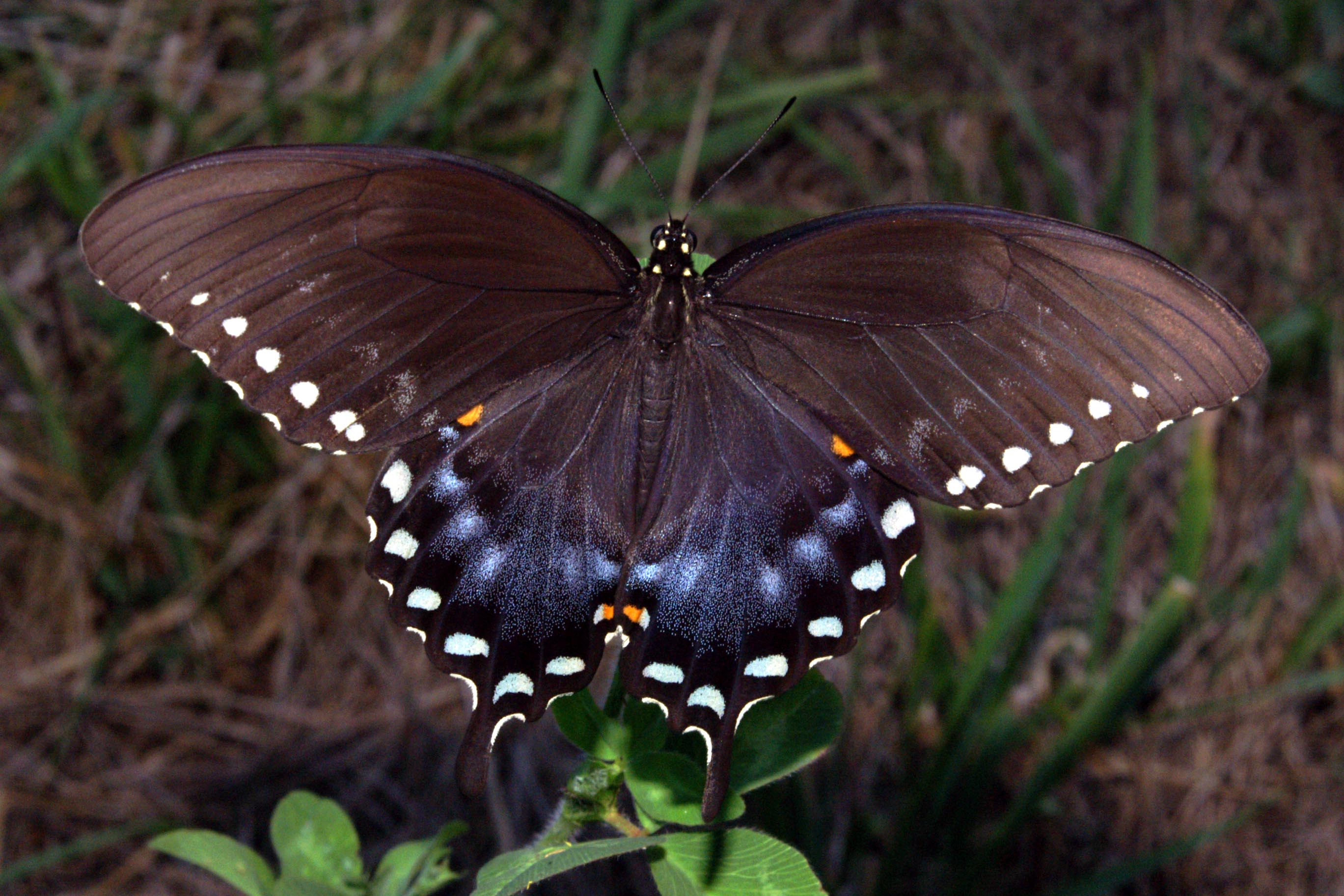

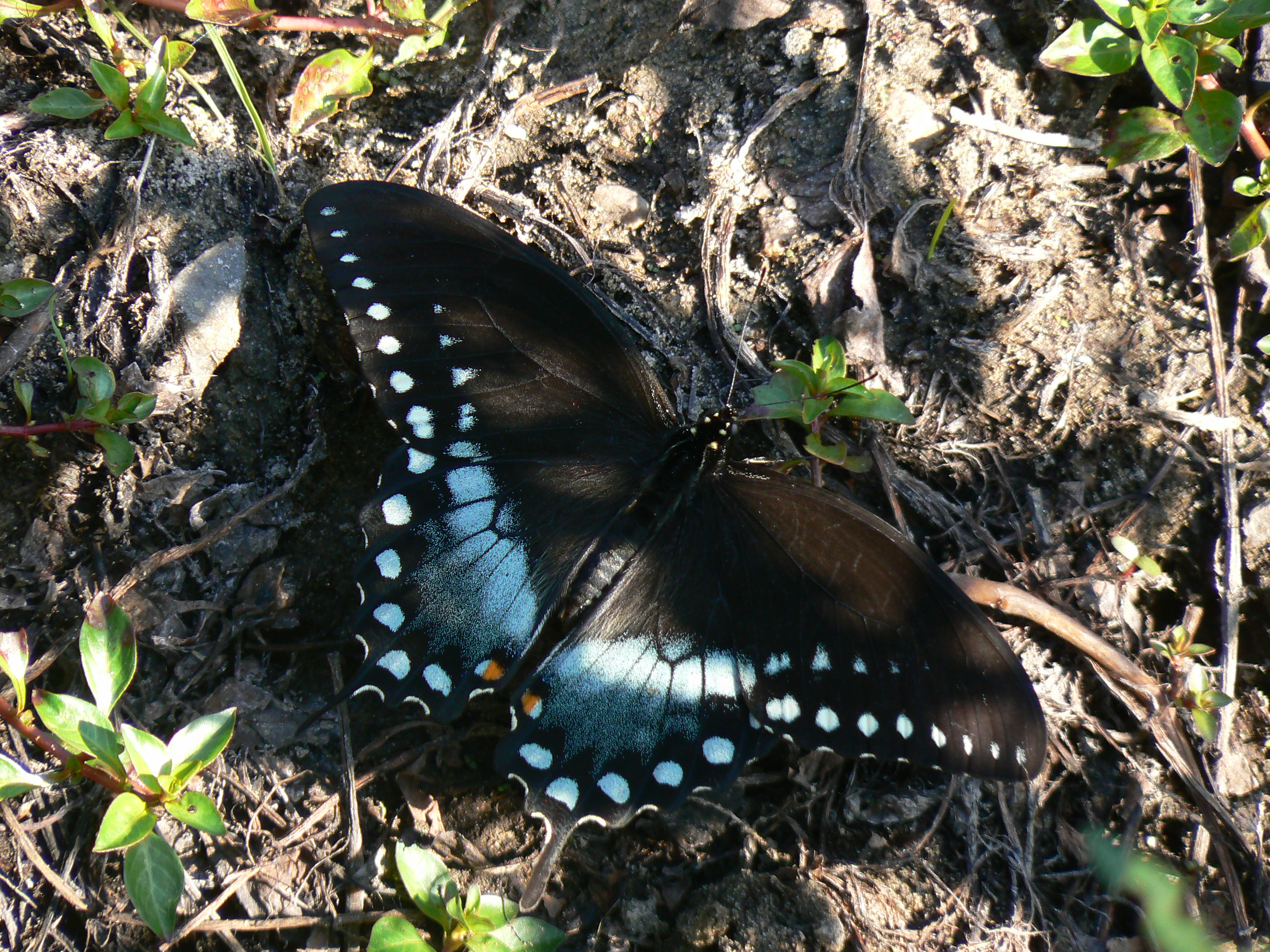

=== P. t. troilus ===
Typically, the wingspan of a spicebush swallowtail ranges from 3 to 4 inches (7.6 to 10.2 cm). Adults are primarily black/brown in color, with a trademark green-blue (male) or bright blue (female) splotch in the shape of a half moon on the hindwings. The forewing has a border of cream-colored, oval spots. In the middle portion of the wing, the spots can be moon shaped and a light blue in color. Both sexes have cream-yellow moon-shaped spots on the edges of the hindwings and a bright orange color spot at the base of the wings. In females, the orange spot at the base of the wings will turn a greenish-white shade in summer, but not the spring.

On the underside of the hindwing, there will be a dual row of orange spots, which distinguishes it from the pipevine swallowtail, which only has a single row of spots. In between these rows, there is more blue or green coloring. Characteristically, the median (inner) orange spots are discontinuous, allowing the blue or green coloring to spread medially.

=== P. t. ilioneus ===
The distinguishing difference in color between the two subspecies is evident where the spots, which are blue in color on the hindwing of the P. t. troilus, are more yellow in color in P. t. ilioneus. Additionally, splashes of blue can trail all the way down the tail of P. t. ilioneus.

== Ecology ==
The host plants of the spicebush swallowtail are most commonly either spicebush (Lindera benzoin) or white sassafras (Sassafras albidum). Other possible host plants include prickly ash (Zanthoxylum), as well as tulip tree (Liriodendron tulipifera), sweetbay (Magnolia virginiana), camphor (Cinnamomum camphora) and redbay (Persea borbonia). Redbay and swampbay (Persea palustris) are the primary host plants for members of the P. t. ilioneus strain, while spicebush and sassafras as the primary hosts for P. t. troilus. However, when given the choice between spicebush and sassafras, the P. t. troilus showed no significant preference for either.

Additionally, P. t. ilioneus live only on redbay because that is the primary host plant within the Southern range. However, in a test of P. t. troilus and P. t. ilioneus on redbay, sassafras and spicebush, although the P. t. ilioneus had higher growth and survival rates on redbay than the P. t. troilus, as a holistic group, both subspecies performed better on sassafras or spicebush over time.

In general, spicebush swallowtails tend to stick to plants that are members of the family Lauraceae. The preference for Lauraceae is so consistent among spicebush swallowtails that under experimental conditions, when placed in an environment with leaves other than Lauraceae, P. troilus died without eating anything. This fact is especially noteworthy because Lauraceae are distantly related to the host plants of other species that are food for Papilio caterpillars. The fact that spicebush swallowtails live and feed primarily on Lauraceae only is noteworthy also because most other varieties of swallowtail butterflies are nowhere near as specific. Part of the reason for the selective nature of P. troilus and host plants may have to do with the requirement of positive stimuli to confirm that a plant is Lauraceae among P. troilus before they will feed on it, while P. glaucus, for example, will at once try to feed on any plant presented to it.

The insistence on feeding primarily on Lauraceae has its advantages for spicebush swallowtails. They are able to feed two to four times more adeptly and efficiently on Lauraceae than P. glaucus on the same plant, for example, who feed on Lauraceae as well as other types of plants. In addition, there has not been any other Lepidoptera species which feeds as efficiently as the P. troilus on spicebush. However, none of the host plants of Papilio troilus occur throughout the full range of the spicebush swallowtail. As stated above, the P. t. ilioneus strain, found in Florida, mostly feeds on redbay, while P. t. troilus feeds on either sassafras or spicebush. In a study, it was found that those spicebush swallowtails that normally feed on redbay did not grow as well on spicebush or sassafras during the first instar of development, while all insects studied grew better throughout the larval period on sassafras or spicebush. In addition, the P. t. ilioneus strain was typically larger in size than the P. t. troilus.

In a recent study, 3-trans-caffeoyl-muco-quinic acid was found to be the substance that compelled spicebush swallowtails to lay their eggs on members of Lauraceae. However, 3-trans-caffeoyl-muco-quinic acid is a component of the extract from sassafras plants but not from spicebush, redbay or camphor tree, the other top three host plants of spicebush swallowtails. This substance is not necessarily itself the stimulant but instead activates another as yet unknown compound that thus compels the spicebush swallowtail to lay eggs. Thus, this substance may hold the link for why some spicebush swallowtails prefer to lay eggs on sassafras rather than spicebush. In addition, 3-trans-caffeoyl-muco-quinic acid is a member of a family of acids, hydroxycinnamic acids, which are present in oviposition stimulants for some members of all five families of swallowtail butterflies. Hydroxycinnamic acids are also present in the extracts from host plants for two other species within the genus Papilio: the black swallowtail butterfly, P. polyxenes, and P. protenor. Thus, hydroxycinnamic acids may help explain why many types of swallowtails choose to oviposit on the plants that they choose.

=== Food sources ===
Spicebush swallowtails gain sustenance from eight major sources. Joe-Pye weed, jewelweed, and honeysuckle are favorite sources of nectar for the adults. They have also been known to drink nectar from lantanas, as well as thistles, milkweeds, azalea, dogbane, mimosa, and sweet pepperbush.

== Life cycle ==
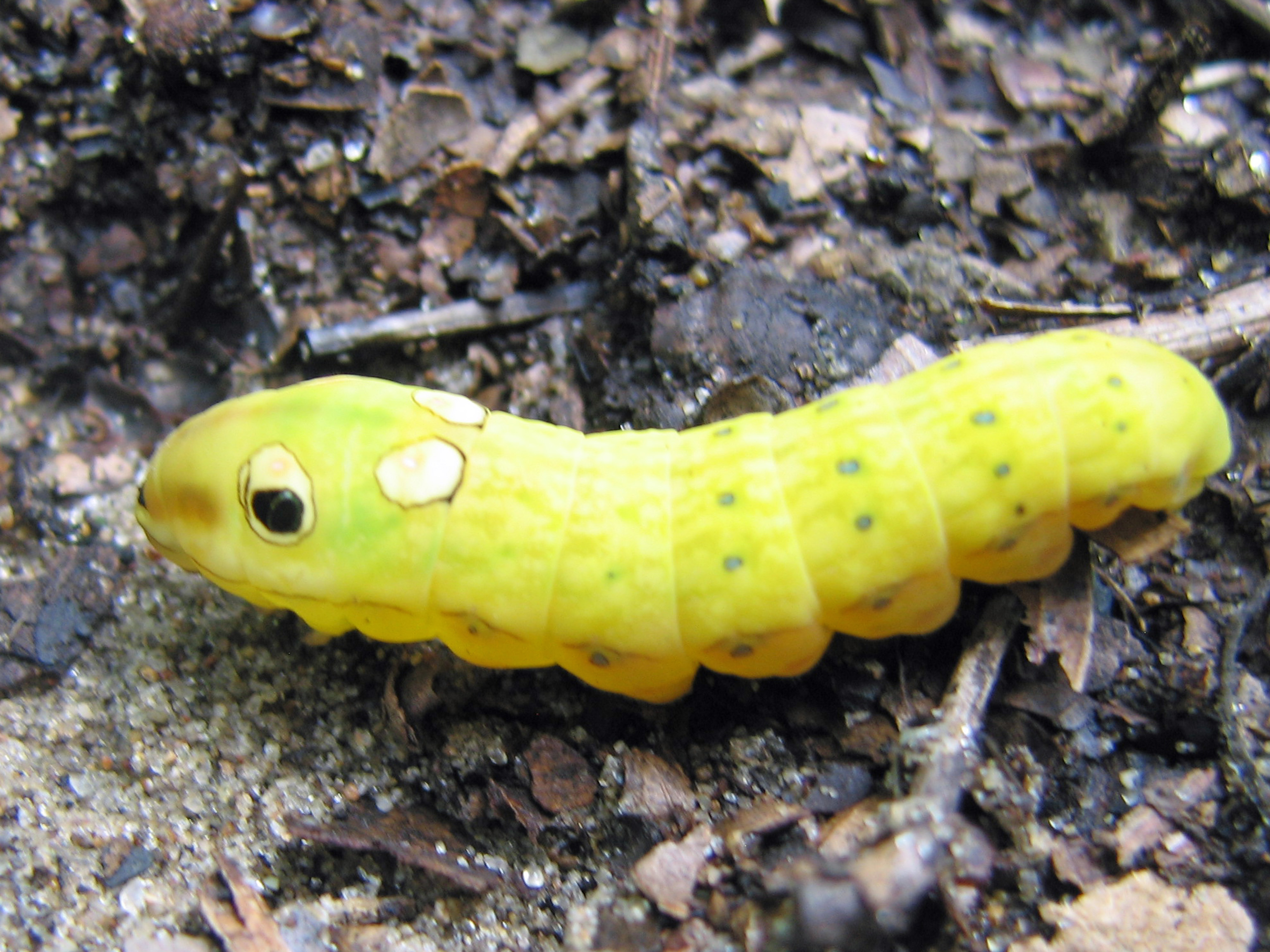
Papilio troilus larva

When female swallowtails decide which leaf to oviposit on, they frequently will drum their forelegs toward a leaf to identify it. Their forelegs have chemoreceptors located in the foretarsi that assess the chemical makeup of the leaf and use that information to decide if it is an acceptable spot. In general, females have shorter and denser sensilla on their forelegs than males, which may be a result of their having to sustain frequent heavy strokes.

The eggs of the spicebush swallowtail are greenish white in color, are fairly large and are laid one or two at a time on a spicebush leaf. Once hatched, the young larvae chew through the leaf from the edge to the midrib, about 3/4 of an inch (19 mm) from the tip of the leaf. The larva lies on the midrib and exudes silk. Upon drying, the silk contracts and causes the leaf to fold up around the larva to form a shelter. At first, young larvae are brownish. The brown color of the larvae is independent of leaf color and will occur even on a green leaf. A folded leaf serves as the home for the young larvae. During the day, the larvae remain in the shelter so as to avoid predators and come out at night to feed. Additionally, if larvae are disturbed while rolled up in the leaf, they emit a foul-smelling substance.

When these larvae reach later stages, they turn greenish yellow before pupating. Older larvae live in a leaf, rolled up and lined with silk and held together by a line of silk. In order to pupate, the larvae will leave the shelter and find the underside of a leaf near the ground to do so. Upon discovery of a suitable leaf, the larvae begin the pupating process by emitting silk from their salivary glands, which helps attach the larvae to the branch or leaf. Then the larvae turn around while still emitting silk, which creates a "safety harness" for the pupating process. At the end of the pupating process, the larvae have become pupae which are either brown (winter) or green (summer).

Orange spicebush swallowtail caterpillar

The practice of turning either brown in winter or green in summer is called seasonal polyphenism. Because the color of the pupa reflects the color of the deciduous host plants, since the leaves will turn brown in winter and green in summer. Even in cases where the leaves are not yet brown, the pupa appear to turn that color in anticipation of the changing colors.

Roughly three generations of spicebush swallowtails occur each year. Most develop into adults throughout the range between the months of February and November. The entire development process from egg to adult takes about a month. Once they have reached the adult stage, Papilio troilus can live anywhere from two days to two weeks dependent on resource availability and predator avoidance.

== Feeding behavior ==
Spicebush swallowtails (along with P. palamedes) are able to thermoregulate their thoraxes better than other Papilio species, perhaps due to their darker body and wing color. This allows them to fly and feed at lower temperatures than their counterparts.

== Social behavior ==
Spicebush swallowtails often engage in puddling, a type of behavior which occurs while adults are flying in search of food or mates. Puddling reflects the fact that while engaging in either feeding or mating behavior, i.e. when they are away from home, spicebush swallowtails tend to stay in groups. These groupings are typically located on the banks of water, such as sandy or moist ridges. When puddling in these groups, the Papilio troilus will extract moisture from the soil or sand near the water.

== Mating behavior ==
In general, both sexes will copulate with several mates during mating season. However, each time a female mates, she becomes less likely to mate again.

One key known form of communication among spicebush swallowtails occurs during mating. Visual cues are important for males to find females, and courtship displays can be elaborate. While these courtship displays occur, the female and male are often in contact, which is likely a way for them to relay information to one another. Additionally, the male butterfly will typically emit pheromones around the female butterfly and the female will use his scent to make her decision about mating.

Females can often be found outside the treeline, in areas of direct sun. This may be due to the fact that these areas are in direct sunlight, which allows for higher thoracic temperatures. Males are less concerned with direct sunlight during mating because their thoracic temperature rises while performing vigorous courtship dances. Males may perform these courtship dances both to females perched on host plants as well as those flying freely.

== Parental care ==
Once eggs are laid, formal parental care ceases among spicebush swallowtails. Larvae do have a nutrient-rich egg, which keeps them well fed during the developmental period. Also, as noted above, females are very particular about host plant choice that aids in the success of egg development.

== Predators and avoidance ==
=== Predators ===
When threatened, a spicebush swallowtail butterfly exudes red drops of a foul-smelling liquid. Its many predators include birds, spiders, robber flies, and dragonflies. All of these creatures will try to eat both adult spicebush swallowtail butterflies and youthful larvae.

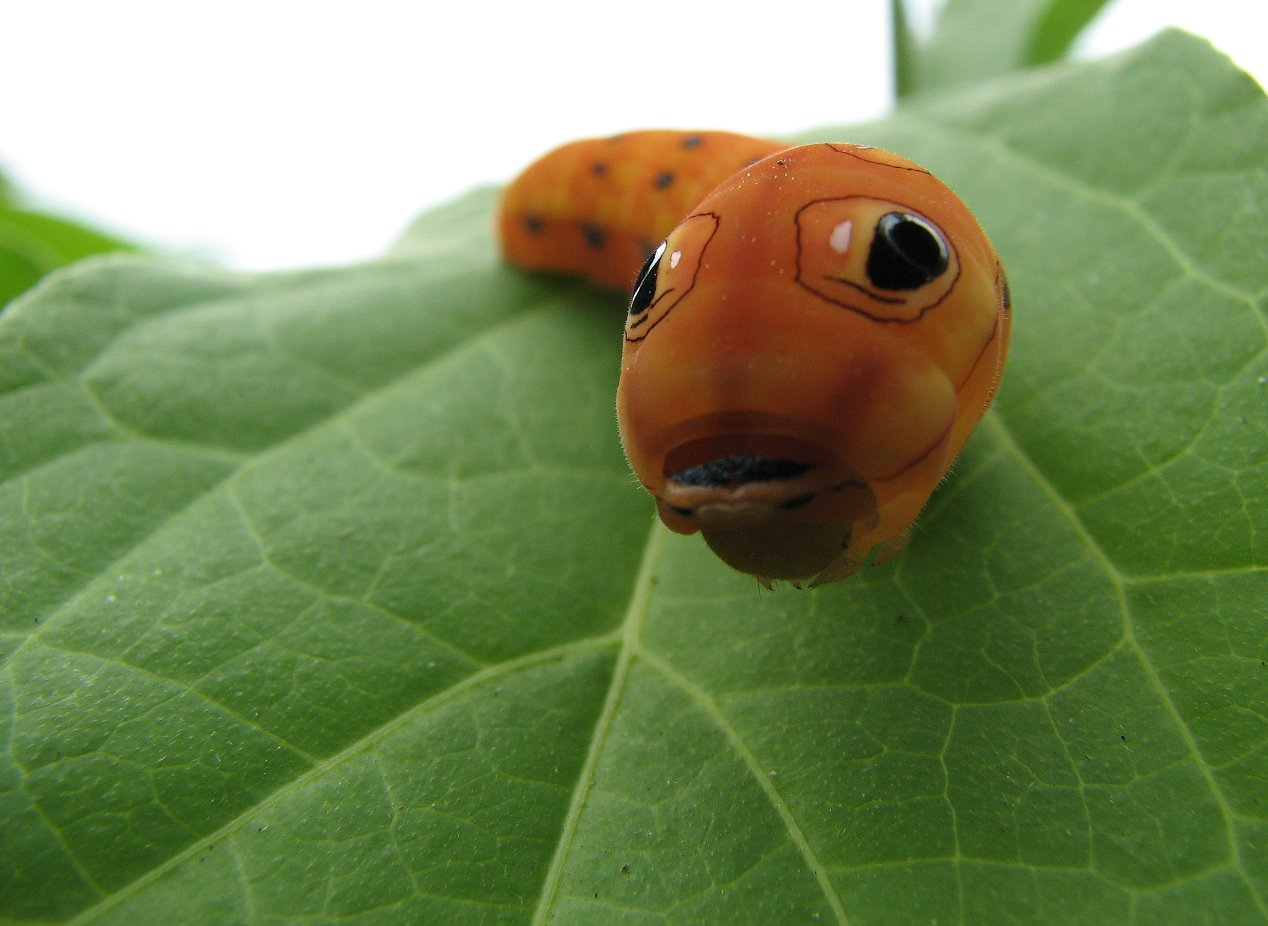
Last instar, prior to pupation

=== Mimicry ===
The spicebush swallowtail's major form of predator avoidance is through mimicry. Both subspecies and sexes of Papilio troilus have the ability to perform mimicry both as a larva and as an adult.

=== Larval mimicry ===
As larvae, spicebush swallowtails have two stages of mimicry. While the larvae are in the early stages, they are dark brown and thus appear to resemble bird droppings, which encourages predators to leave them alone. When the larvae have progressed to their fourth and last instar and are nearly ready to pupate, they turn a yellow-green color and are marked by two large black dots with a white highlight. The placement of these dots on the swollen thorax creates the illusion that the caterpillars are common green snakes. Mimicking snakes help the caterpillars to ward off predators, specifically birds. The caterpillar spicebush swallowtails enhance the physical resemblance behaviorally, as they have been observed to "rear up and retract the actual caterpillar head."

The osmeterium of the caterpillar also helps to enhance the resemblance to a snake. When attacked, the larvae will expose the osmeterium, a Y-shaped organ typically folded up within the caterpillar. For many spicebush swallowtails, the osmeterium is red, thus creating the illusion of a snake tongue and even further enhancing the disguise.

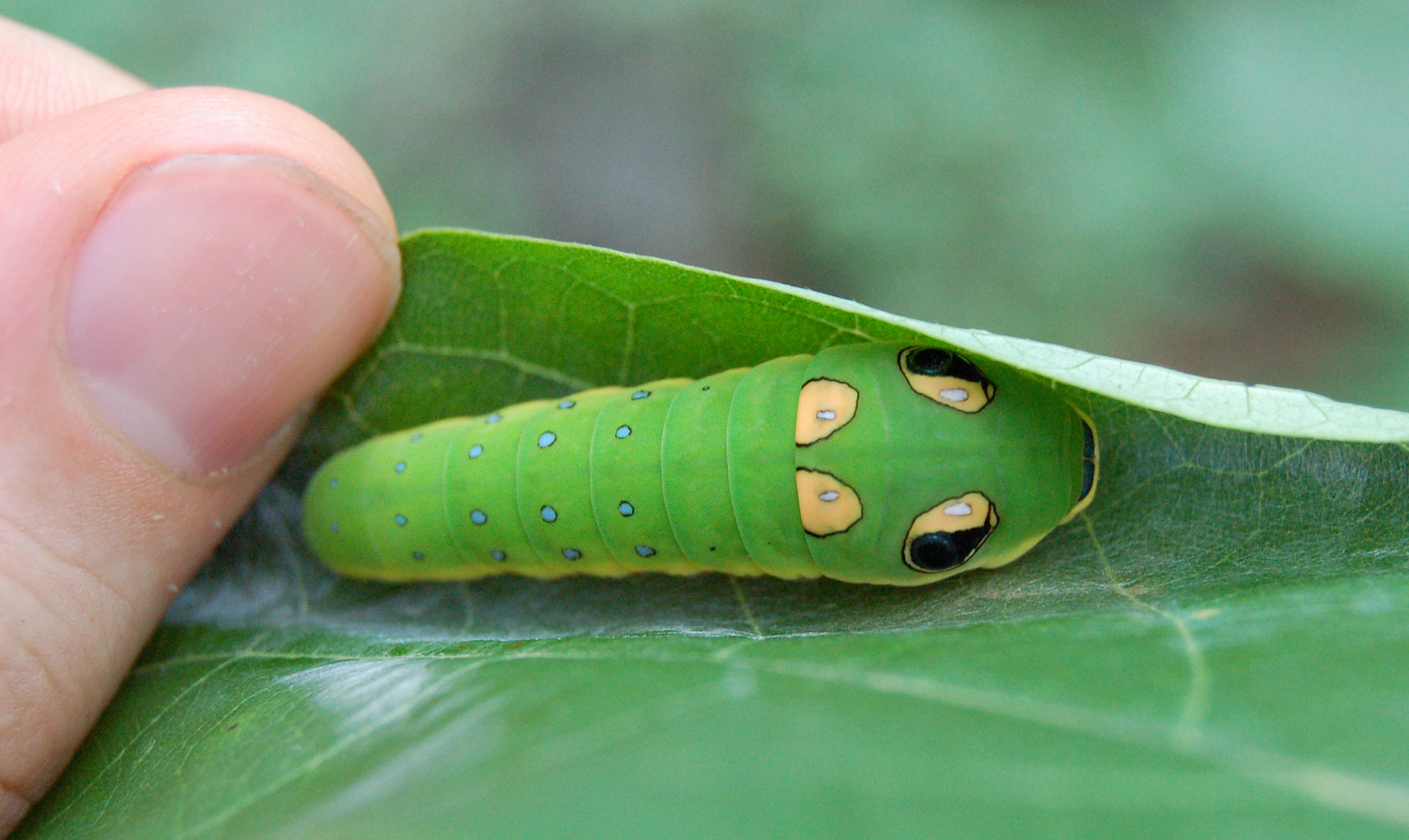
Larval mimicry, fourth instar

=== Adult mimicry ===
Adult spicebush swallowtails practice another type of mimicry, as they resemble the pipevine swallowtail (Battus philenor), a foul-tasting butterfly. Each of the sexes are able to exhibit mimicry of B. philenor successfully, even though the brighter-blue color on female wings is a little more vibrant than the pipevine swallowtail's coloring. As they themselves are not unpalatable and the pipevine are, this is an example of Batesian mimicry. If predators know that the pipevine swallowtail has a foul taste, they are unlikely to eat it and also unlikely to eat the spicebush swallowtail. There are other adult butterflies which mimic the poisonous B. philenor, including P. polyxenes, P. glaucus, C. promethea and L. astyanax, but P. troilus most closely resembles it. However, P. troilus has a greater physical resemblance to the other mimics than it does to B. philenor.

Besides mimicry, another form of predator avoidance for spicebush swallowtails is the "club-like extensions from their hind-wings." An attack from a predator focused on the "false head" will leave the butterfly itself unharmed, though with slightly damaged wings.
