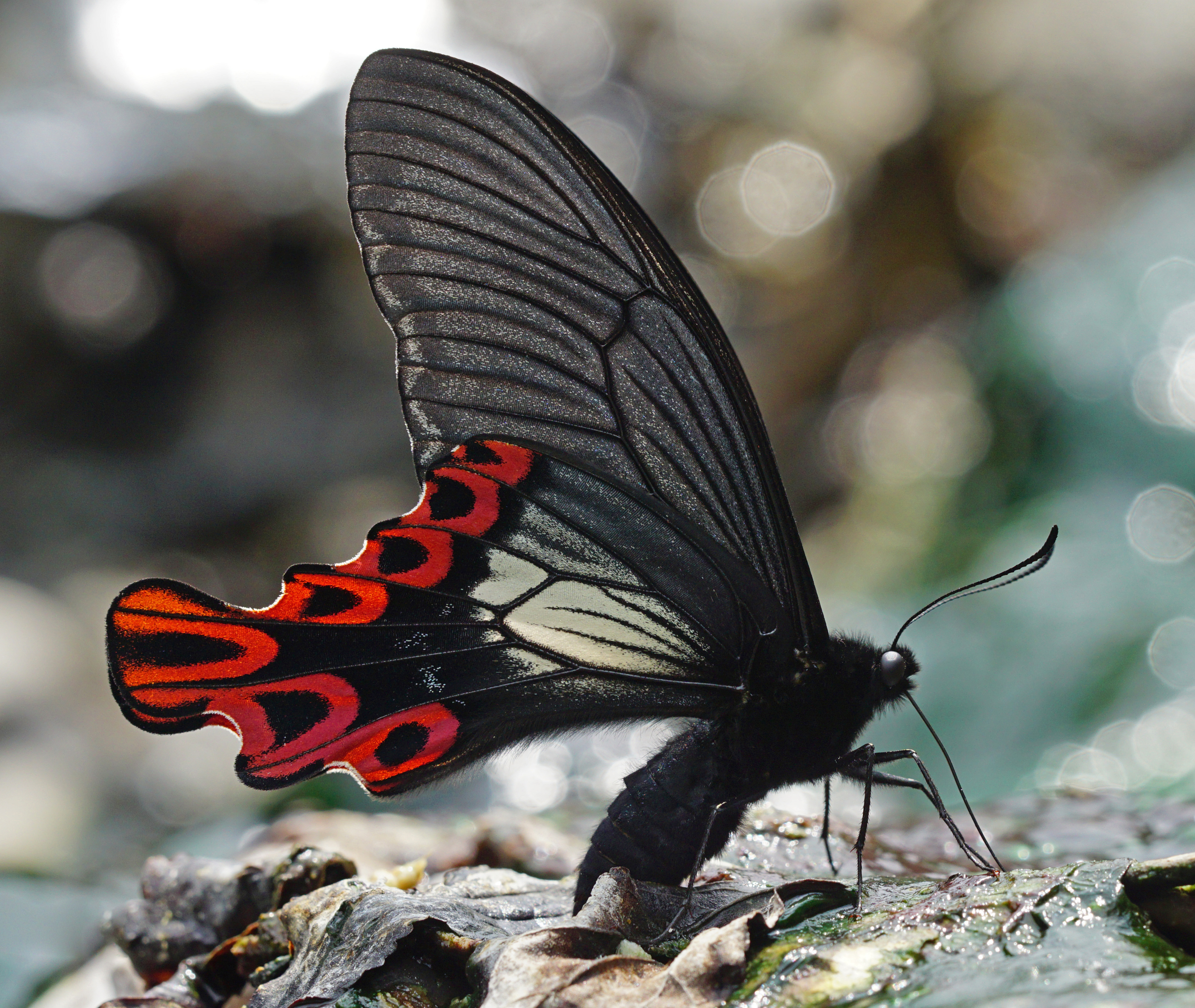

Conservation status
- Near Threatened (IUCN 2.3)

Scientific classification
- Kingdom: Animalia
- Phylum: Arthropoda
- Clade: Pancrustacea
- Class: Insecta
- Order: Lepidoptera
- Family: Papilionidae
- Genus: Papilio
- Species: P. maraho

Binomial name
- Papilio maraho (Shiraki & Sonan, 1934)

= Papilio maraho =

Species of butterfly

Papilio maraho is a species of butterfly in the family Papilionidae. It is endemic to Taiwan and has the highest profile due to its rarity and listing as a vulnerable species in the IUCN Red Data Book. Morphologically, it is very similar to Papilio elwesi. Both of species are in Agehana (a species group, often treated as a genus or a subgenus, within Papilio sensu lato). Based on the phylogenetic research, "Agehana" fell within the American Papilio subgenus Pterourus.

The forewing is about 6 cm long. The female is a little larger than the male. The reverse and obverse are identical. The forewings are dark grey with black veins. The hindwings are elongated and terminated by broad tails. They are dark grey with black veins, a large white macule and a series of submarginal pinkish-red macules marked with a black dot. The body is black.The first four larval instars look like bird droppings. The mature caterpillar mimics a snake's head. It is green with dark brown markings on the flanks, and an enlarged thoracic part that bears large black ocelli surrounded by brown on each side.

Papilio maraho feeds exclusively on Sassafras randaiense, a plant that's considered vulnerable by the IUCN. The host plant is only found in a few sunny spots in forest gaps at medium elevations in Taiwan's Central Mountain Range.

== See also ==
- List of protected species in Taiwan
- List of endemic species of Taiwan
