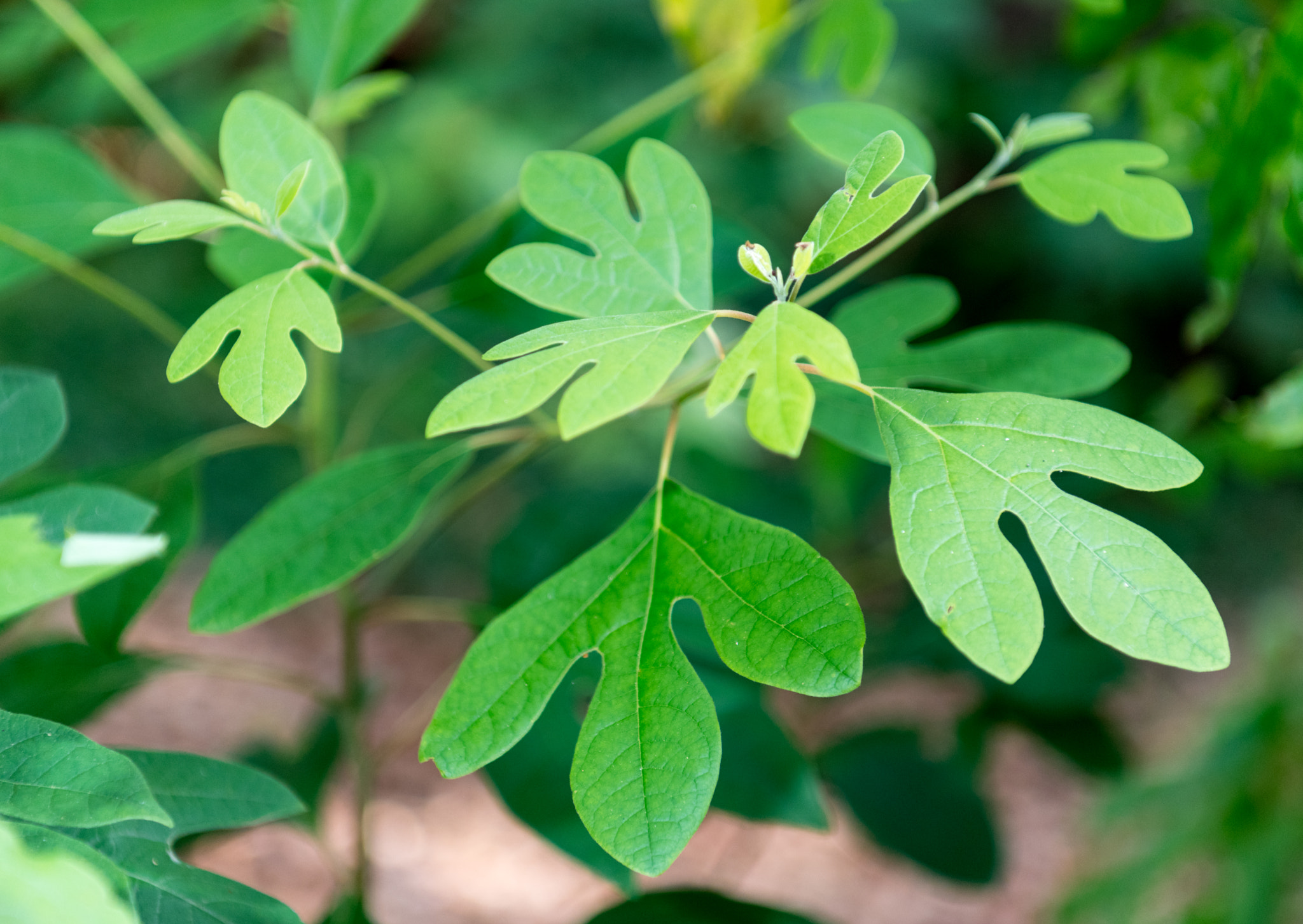

Conservation status
- Least Concern (IUCN 3.1)

Scientific classification
- Kingdom: Plantae
- Clade: Tracheophytes
- Clade: Angiosperms
- Clade: Magnoliids
- Order: Laurales
- Family: Lauraceae
- Genus: Sassafras
- Species: S. albidum

Binomial name
- Sassafras albidum (Nutt.) Nees
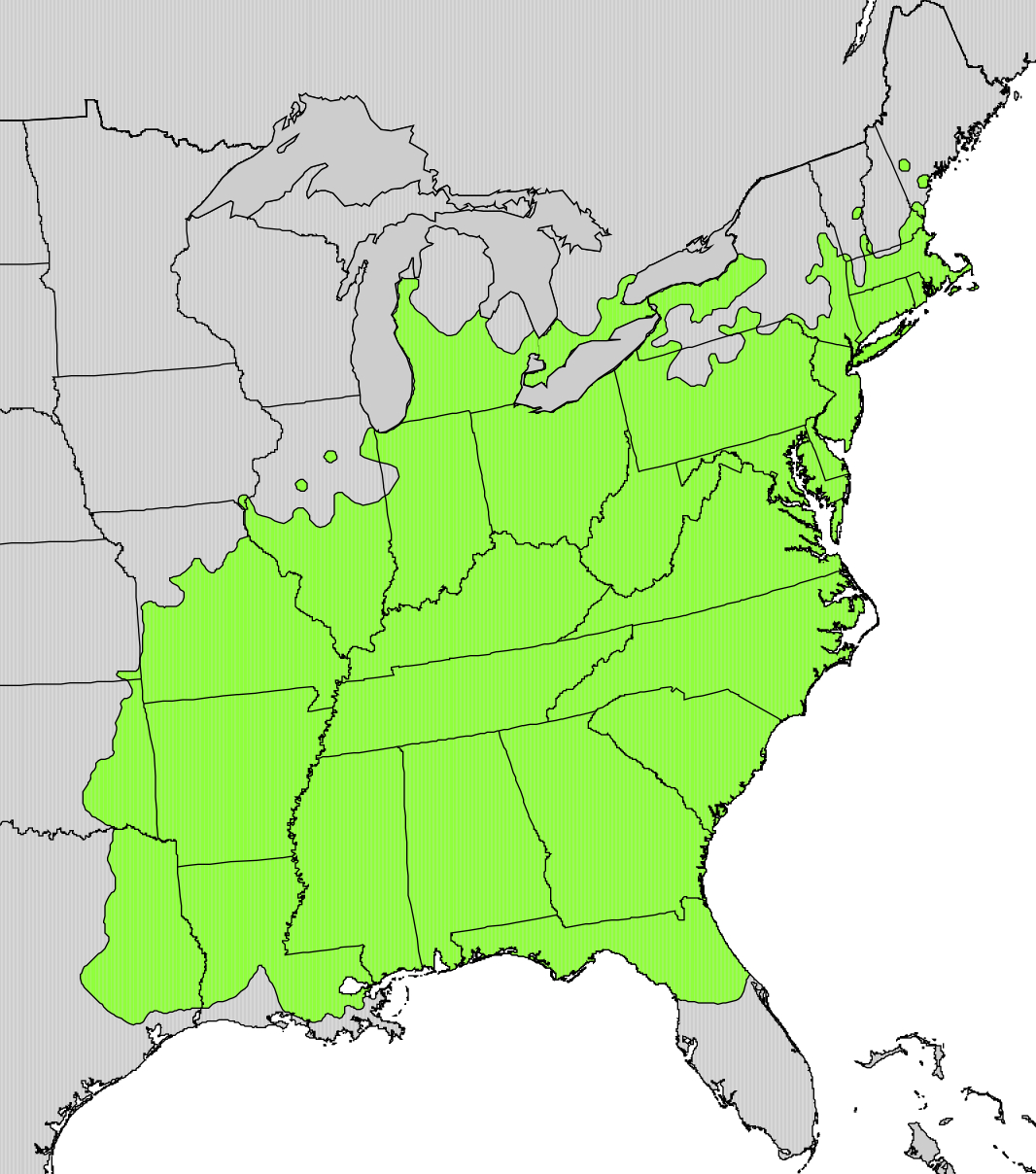
- Natural range

Synonyms
- Laurus albida Nutt.; Laurus albida Loudon ex Meisn., not validly publ.; Laurus diversifolia Stokes, nom. illeg. superfl.; Laurus salsafraz Noronha; Laurus sassafras L.; Laurus variifolia Salisb.; Persea sassafras (L.) Spreng.; Sassafras albidum f. moldenkei Oswald; Sassafras albidum var. molle (Raf.) Fernald; Sassafras laurus Macloskie; Sassafras officinale T. Nees & C.H. Eberm.; Sassafras officinale var. albidum (Nutt.) S.F.Blake; Sassafras officinarum J.Presl; Sassafras rubrum Raf.; Sassafras sassafras (L.) H.Karst.; Sassafras triloba Raf.; Sassafras triloba var. mollis Raf.; Sassafras variifolium Kuntze; Sassafras variifolium var. albidum (Nutt.) Fernald; Tetranthera albida (Nutt.) Spreng.

= Sassafras albidum =

Species of plant

Sassafras albidum (sassafras, white sassafras, red sassafras, or silky sassafras) is a species of Sassafras native to eastern North America. It has a number of culinary and other uses.

== Description ==
Sassafras albidum is a medium-sized deciduous tree growing to 15–20 m (49–66 ft) tall, with a canopy up to 12 m (39 ft) wide, with a trunk up to 60 cm (24 in) in diameter, and a crown with many slender sympodial branches. The bark on trunk of mature trees is thick, dark red-brown, and deeply furrowed. The cotyledons are thick and fleshy. The shoots are bright yellow green at first with mucilaginous bark, turning reddish brown, and in two or three years begin to show shallow fissures. The roots are thick and fleshy, and frequently produce root sprouts which can develop into new trees.

The leaves are alternate, green to yellow-green, ovate or obovate, 10–15 cm (4–6 in) long and 5–10 cm (2–4 in) broad with a short, slender, slightly grooved petiole. They come in three different shapes, all of which can be on the same branch; three-lobed leaves, unlobed elliptical leaves, and two-lobed leaves; rarely, there can be more than three lobes. In fall, they turn to shades of yellow, tinged with red.

The flowers are produced in loose, drooping, few-flowered racemes up to 5 cm (2 in) long in early spring shortly before the leaves appear; they are yellow to greenish-yellow, with five or six tepals. It is usually dioecious, with male and female flowers on separate trees; male flowers have nine stamens, female flowers with six staminodes (aborted stamens) and a 2–3 mm style on a superior ovary. Pollination is by insects. The fruit is a dark blue-black drupe 1 cm (0.39 in) long containing a single seed, borne on a red fleshy club-shaped pedicel 2 cm (0.79 in) long; it is ripe in late summer, with the seeds dispersed by birds. All parts of the plant are aromatic and spicy.

== Distribution and habitat ==
The species is native to eastern North America, from southern Maine and southern Ontario west to Iowa, and south to central Florida and eastern Texas. It occurs throughout the eastern deciduous forest habitat type, at altitudes of up to 1,500 m (4,900 ft) above sea level. It formerly also occurred in southern Wisconsin, but is extirpated there as a native tree.

== Ecology ==
S. albidum prefers rich, well-drained sandy loam with a pH of 6–7, but will grow in any loose, moist soil. Seedlings will tolerate shade, but saplings and older trees demand full sunlight for good growth; in forests it typically regenerates in gaps created by windblow. Growth is rapid, particularly with root sprouts, which can reach 1.2 m (4 ft) in the first year and 4.5 m (15 ft) in four years. Root sprouts often result in dense thickets, and a single tree, if allowed to spread unrestrained, will soon be surrounded by a sizable clonal colony, as its roots extend in every direction and send up multitudes of shoots.

S. albidum hosts the caterpillars of 37 species of butterflies and moths, including the eastern tiger swallowtail (Papilio glaucus), spicebush swallowtail (Papilio troilus), palamedes swallowtail (Papilio palamedes) and pale swallowtail (Papilio eurymedon) butterflies and the cecropia (Hyalophora cecropia), promethea (Callosamia promethea), polyphemus (Antheraea polyphemus), imperial (Eacles imperialis), and io (Automeris io) moths.

=== Laurel wilt ===
Laurel wilt is a highly destructive disease initiated when the invasive flying redbay ambrosia beetle (Xyleborus glabratus) introduces its highly virulent fungal symbiont Raffaelea lauricola into the sapwood of Lauraceae shrubs or trees. Sassafras's volatile terpenoids may attract X. glabratus. Sassafras is susceptible to laurel wilt and capable of supporting broods of X. glabratus. Underground transmission of the pathogen through roots and stolons of Sassafras without evidence of X. glabratus attack is suggested. Studies examining the insect's cold tolerance showed that X. glabratus may be able to move to colder northern areas where sassafras would be the main host. The exotic Asian insect spread the epidemic from the Everglades through the Carolinas and into northern Kentucky by 2024.

== Uses ==
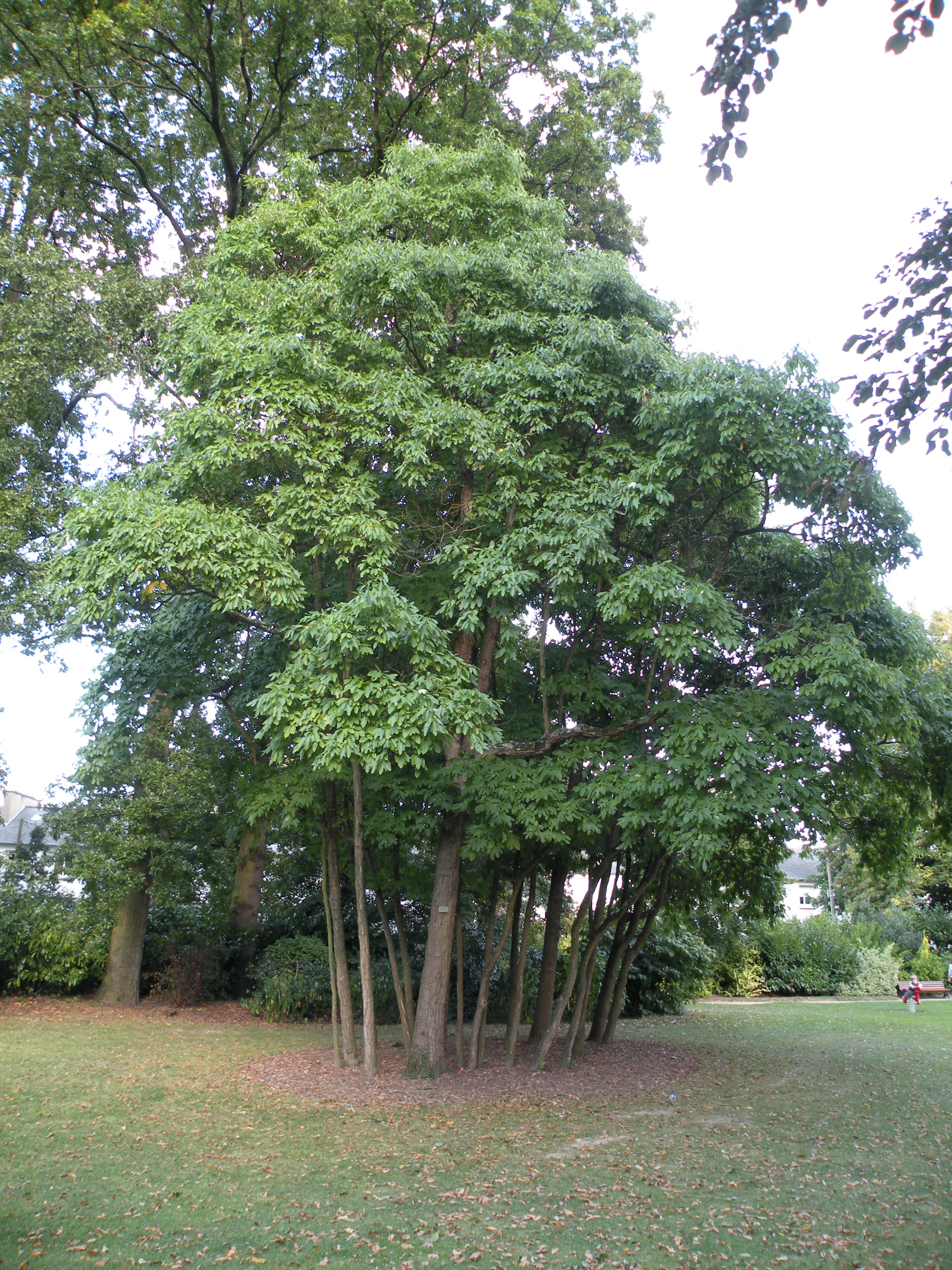
Parc Oberthür, Rennes

All parts of the plant have been used by humans, including the stems, leaves, bark, wood, roots, fruit, and flowers. While native to North America, it is significant to the economic, medical, and cultural history of both Europe and North America. In North America, it has particular culinary significance, being featured in distinct national foods such as traditional root beer, filé powder, and Louisiana Cajun cuisine. It was an important plant to many Native Americans of the southeastern United States and was used for many purposes, including culinary and medicinal purposes, before the arrival of Europeans, when the foreigners were first introduced to sassafras (along with other plants such as cranberries, tobacco, and American ginseng).

The wood is dull orange brown, hard, and durable in contact with the soil; it was used in the past for posts and rails, small boats and ox-yokes, though scarcity and small size limits current use. Some is still used for making furniture.

=== Use by Native Americans ===
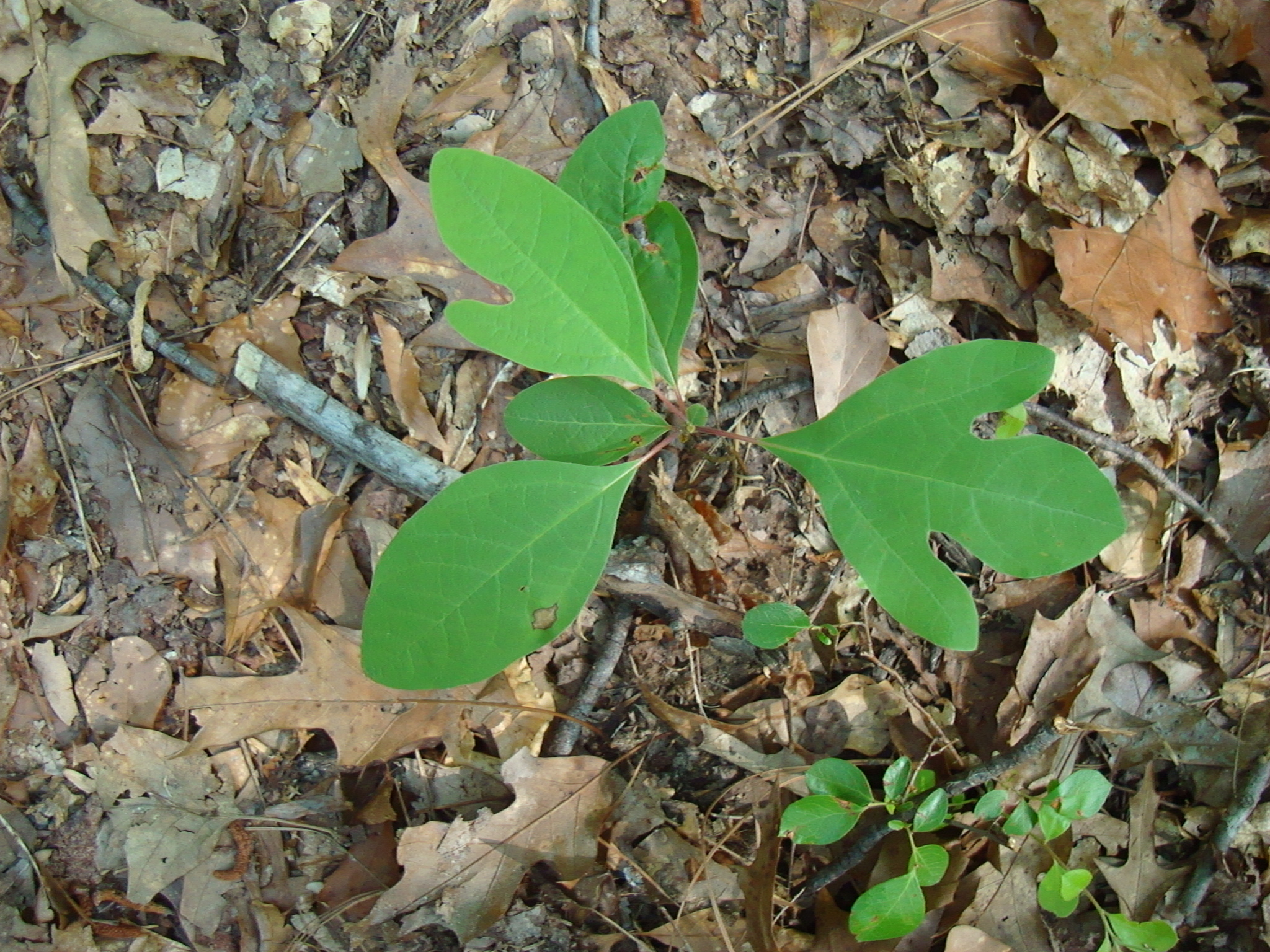
Sassafras with all 3 lobe variations seen.

Sassafras albidum was a well-used plant by Native Americans in what is now the Southeastern U.S. prior to the European colonization. The Choctaw word for sassafras is Kvfi, and it was used by them principally as a soup thickener. It was known as "Winauk" in Delaware and Virginia, and is called "Pauame" by the Timuca and onö́sda’shä’ by the Seneca.

Some Native American peoples used the leaves of sassafras to treat wounds by rubbing the leaves directly into a wound, and used different parts of the plant for many medicinal purposes such as treating acne, urinary disorders, and fevers. They also used the bark as a dye, and as a flavoring.

Sassafras wood was also used by Native Americans in the Southeastern U.S. as a fire starter because of the flammability of its natural oils.

In cooking, sassafras was used by some Native Americans to flavor bear fat, and to cure meats. Sassafras is still used today to cure meats. Use of filé powder by the Choctaw in the Southern U.S. in cooking is linked to the development of gumbo, a signature dish of Louisiana Creole cuisine.

The plant's significance for Native Americans is magnified due to the Europeans interactions with indigenous peoples as the colonies of Florida, Virginia, and parts of the Northeast arranged sassafras as an export commodity during the 16th and 17th centuries.

=== Modern culinary use and legislation ===
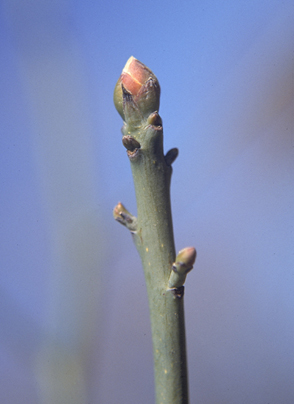
Sassafras twig and terminal bud

Sassafras albidum is used primarily in the U.S. as the key ingredient in home-brewed root beer and as a thickener and flavouring in traditional Louisiana Creole gumbo.

Filé powder, also called gumbo filé for its use in making gumbo, is a spicy herb made from the dried and ground leaves of the sassafras tree. It was traditionally used by Native Americans in the Southern U.S., and was adopted into Louisiana Creole cuisine. Use of filé powder by the Choctaw in the Southern U.S. in cooking is linked to the development of gumbo, the signature dish of Louisiana Creole cuisine that features ground sassafras leaves. The leaves and root bark can be pulverized to flavor soup, gravy, and meat.

Sassafras roots are used to make traditional root beer, although they were banned for commercially mass-produced foods and drugs by the U.S. Food and Drug Administration in 1960. Laboratory animals that were given oral doses of sassafras tea or sassafras oil that contained large doses of safrole developed permanent liver damage or various types of cancer. In humans, liver damage can take years to develop, and it may not have obvious signs. Along with commercially available sarsaparilla, sassafras remains an ingredient in use among hobby or microbrew enthusiasts. While sassafras is no longer used in commercially produced root beer and is sometimes substituted with artificial flavors, natural extracts with the safrole distilled and removed are available. Most commercial root beers have replaced the sassafras extract with methyl salicylate, the ester found in wintergreen and black birch (Betula lenta) bark.

Sassafras tea was also banned in the U.S. in 1977, but the ban was lifted with the passage of the Dietary Supplement Health and Education Act in 1994.

=== Safrole and oil ===
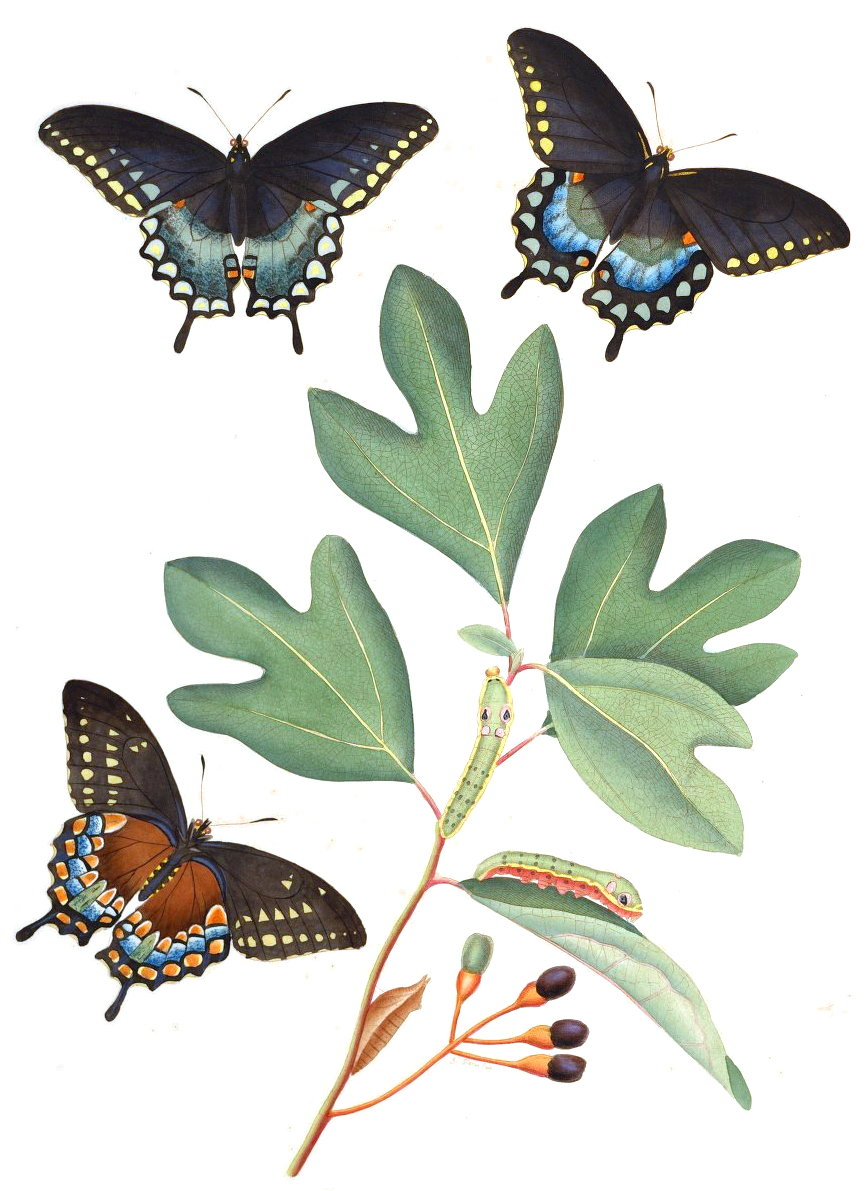
S. albidum is a host plant for the spicebush swallowtail.

Safrole can be obtained fairly easily from the root bark of S. albidum via steam distillation. It has been used as a natural insect or pest deterrent. Godfrey's Cordial, as well as other tonics given to children that consisted of opiates, used sassafras to disguise other strong smells and odours associated with the tonics. It was also used as an additional flavouring to mask the strong odours of homemade liquor in the U.S.

Chemical structure of safrole, a constituent of sassafras essential oil

Commercial "sassafras oil", which contains safrole, is generally a byproduct of camphor production in Asia or comes from related trees in Brazil. Safrole is a precursor chemical for the manufacture of the drugs MDMA and MDA (3-4 methylenedioxyamphetamine) and as such, its transport is monitored internationally. The U.S. Drug Enforcement Administration regards safrole as a Schedule I precursor.

=== History of commercial use ===
The aromatic smell of sassafras was described by early European settlers arriving in North America. According to one legend, Christopher Columbus found North America because he could smell the scent of sassafras. As early as the 1560s, French visitors to North America discovered the medicinal qualities of sassafras, which was also exploited by the Spanish who arrived in Florida. English settlers at Roanoke reported surviving on boiled sassafras leaves and dog meat during times of starvation.

Upon the arrival of the English on the Eastern coast of North America, sassafras trees were reported as plentiful. Sassafras was sold in England and in continental Europe, where it was sold as a dark beverage called "saloop" that had medicinal qualities and used as a medicinal cure for a variety of ailments. The discovery of sassafras occurred at the same time as a severe syphilis outbreak in Europe, when little about this terrible disease was understood, and sassafras was touted as a cure. Sir Francis Drake was one of the earliest to bring sassafras to England in 1586, and Sir Walter Raleigh was the first to export sassafras as a commodity in 1602. Sassafras became a major export commodity to England and other areas of Europe, as a medicinal root used to treat ague (fevers) and sexually transmitted diseases such as syphilis and gonorrhea, and as wood prized for its beauty and durability. Exploration for sassafras was the catalyst for the 1603 commercial expedition from Bristol of Captain Martin Pring to the coasts of present-day Maine, New Hampshire, and Massachusetts. During a brief period in the early 17th century, sassafras was the second-largest export from the British colonies in North America, behind tobacco.

Since the bark was the most commercially valued part of the sassafras plant due to large concentrations of the aromatic safrole oil, commercially valuable sassafras could only be gathered from each tree once. This meant that as significant amounts of sassafras bark were gathered, supplies quickly diminished and sassafras become more difficult to find. For example, while one of the earliest shipments of sassafras in 1602 weighed as much as a ton, by 1626, English colonists failed to meet their 30-pound quota. The gathering of sassafras bark brought European settlers and Native Americans into contact, sometimes dangerous to both groups. Sassafras was such a desired commodity in England that the Colony of Virginia sought to reach profitability with trade monopolies in sassafras and tobacco.

== Gallery ==
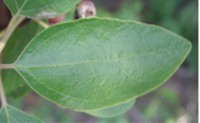
Unilobed leaf

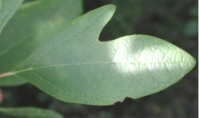
Bilobed leaf

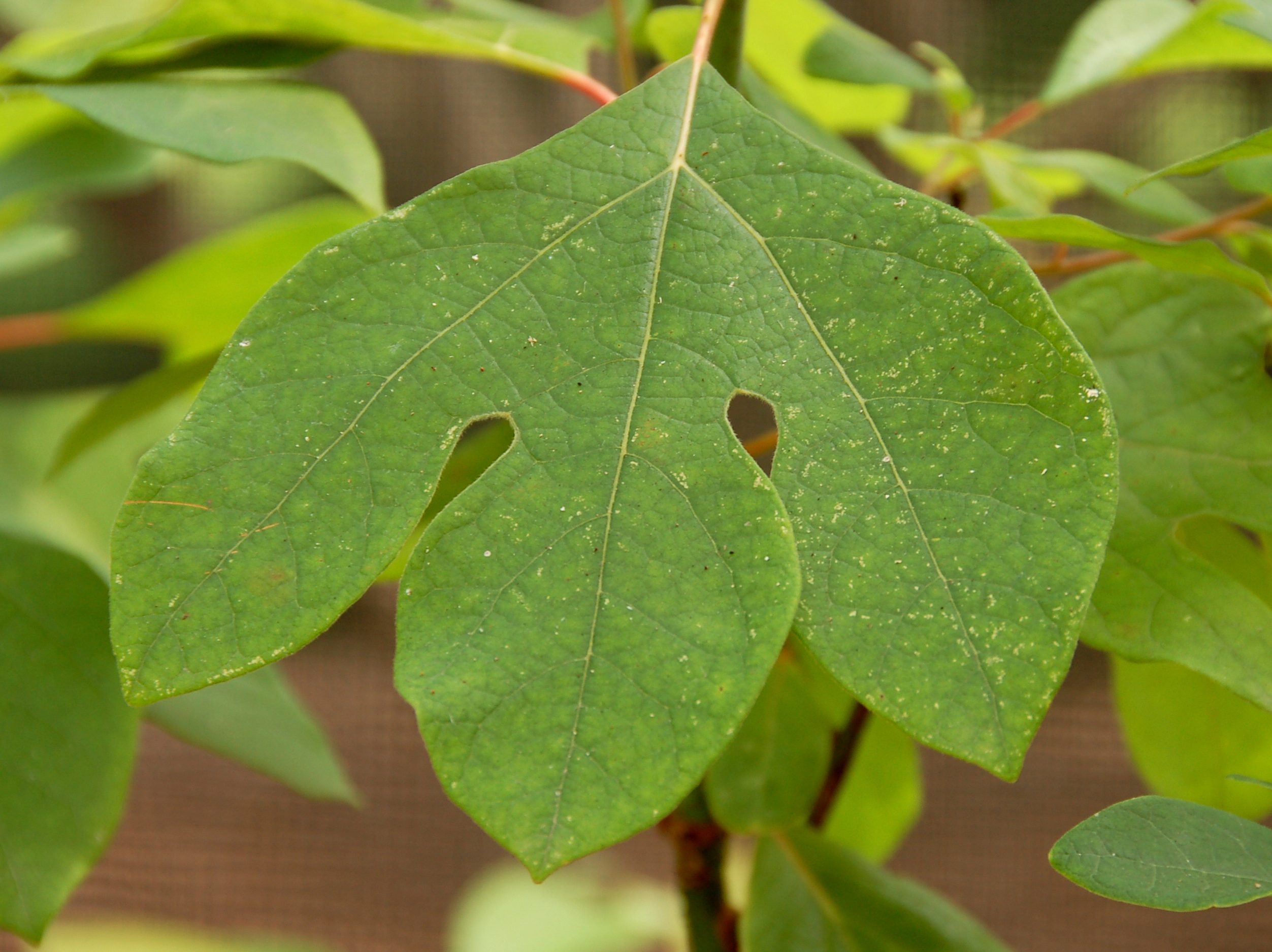
Trilobed leaf

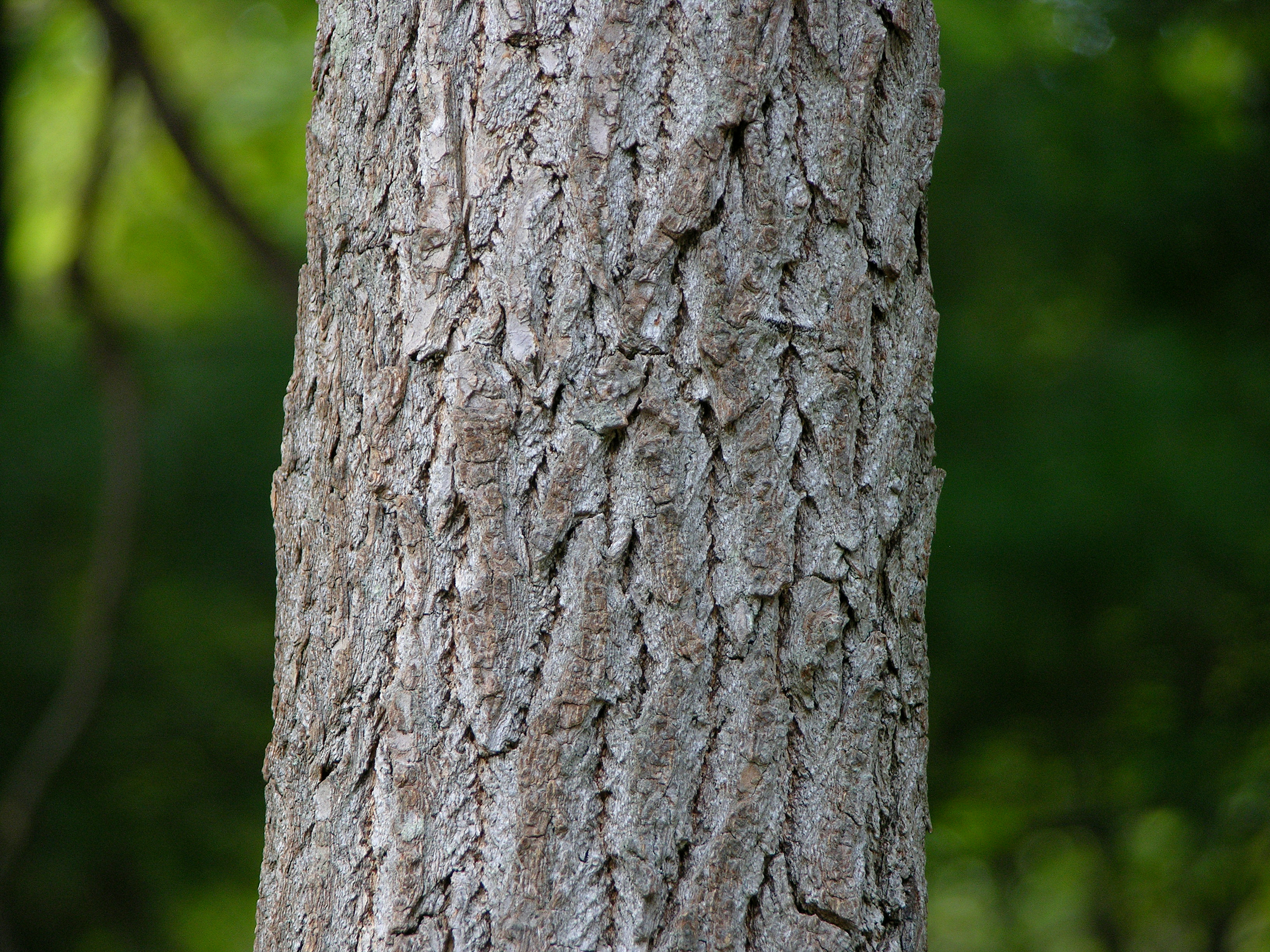
Bark

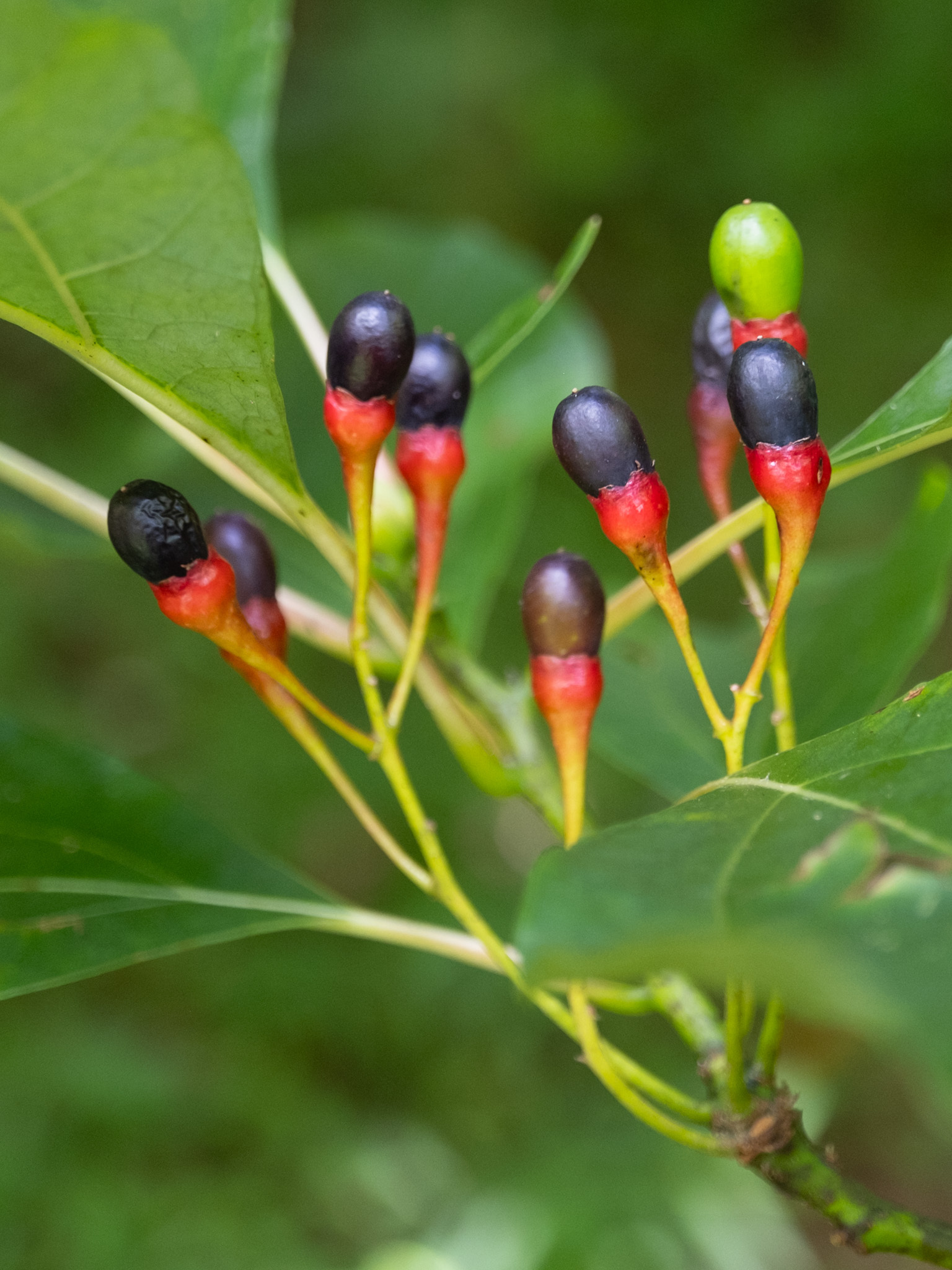
Fruit

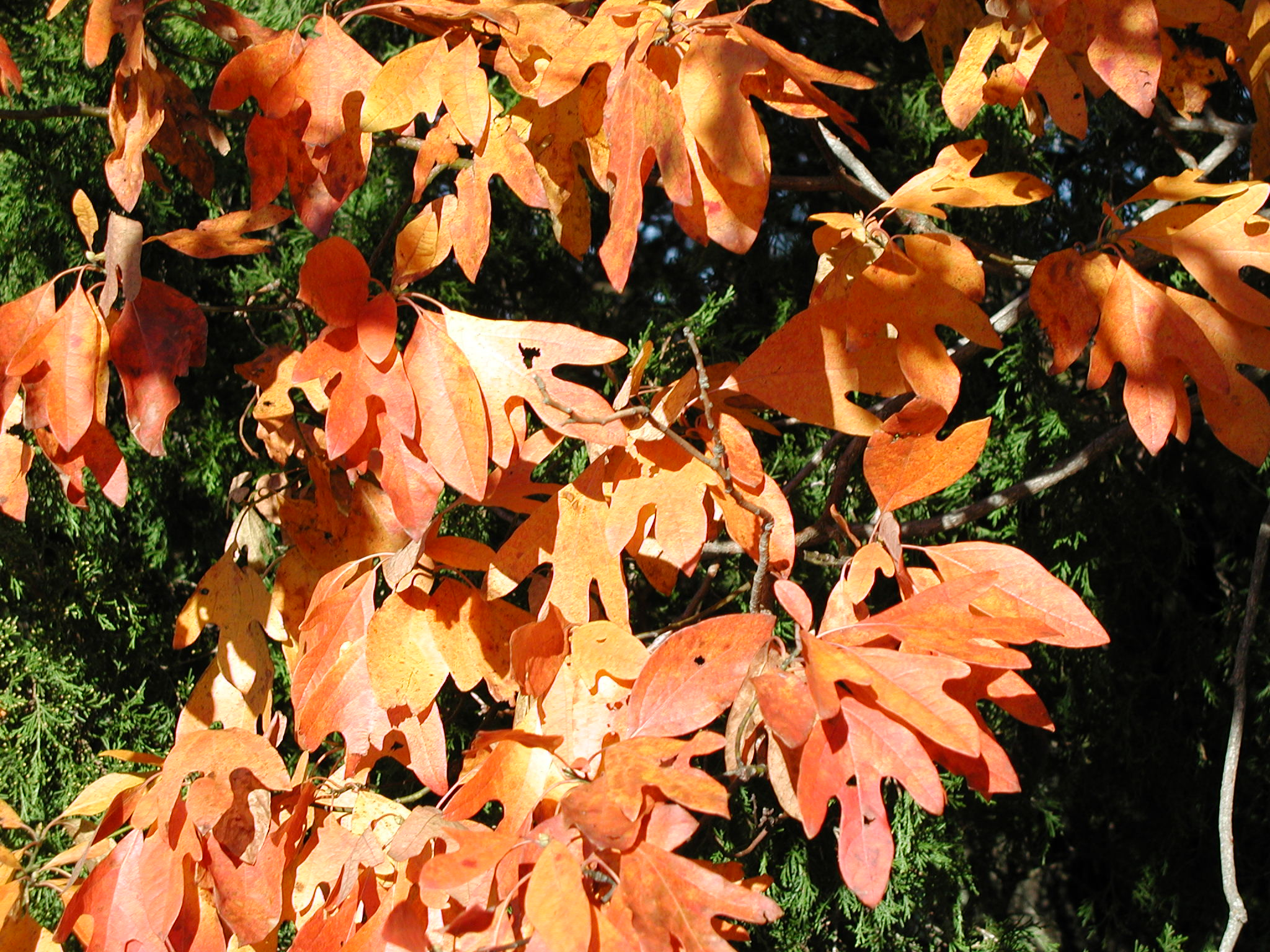
Autumn foliage

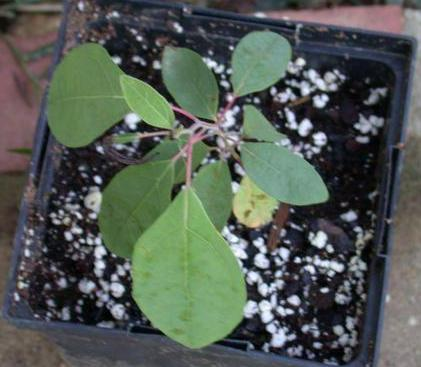
Seedling

== See also ==
- Sarsaparilla (drink)
- Sassafras hesperia
- Sassafras randaiense
- Sassafras tzumu
