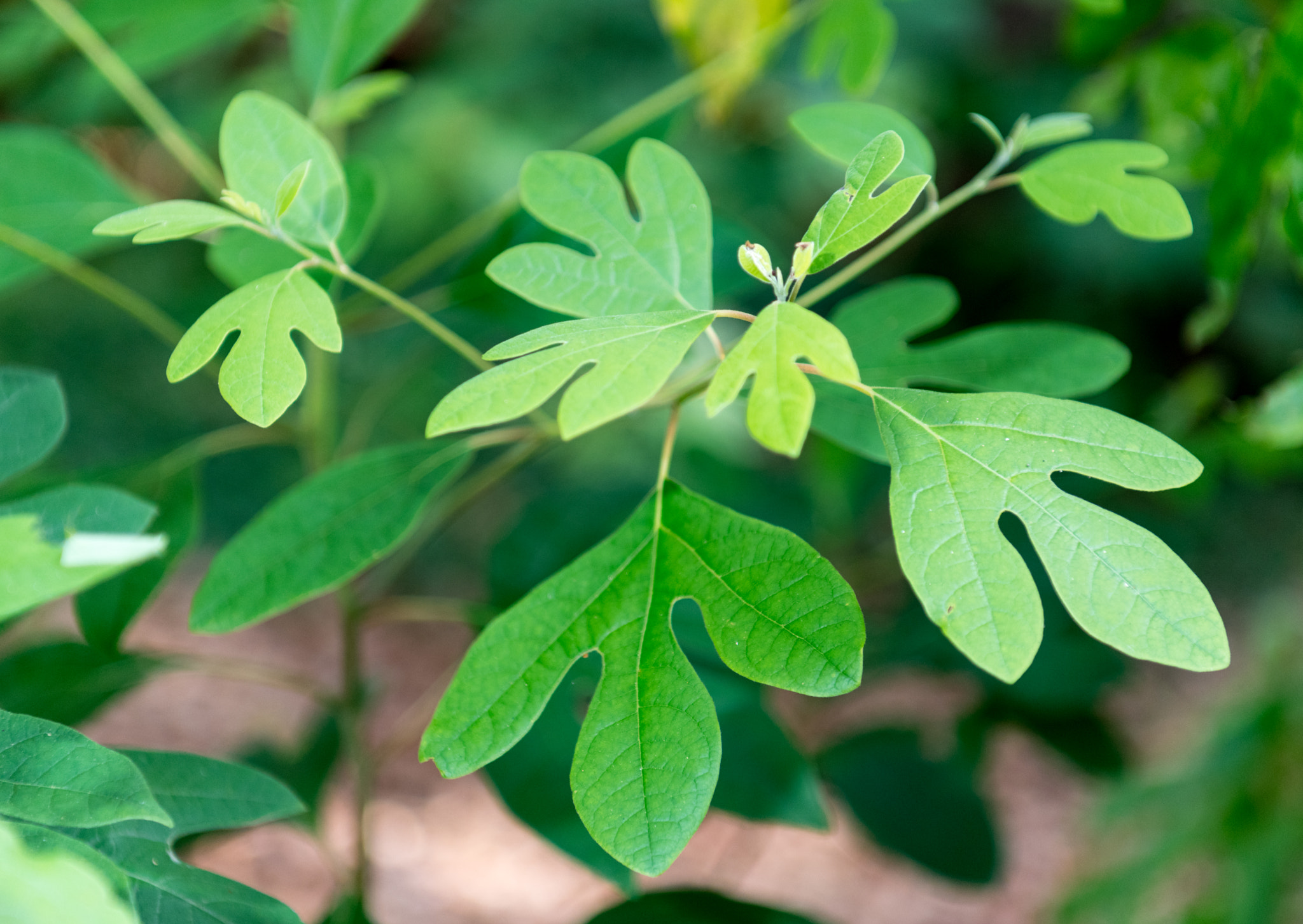
- Sassafras albidum, Norfolk Botanical Garden

Scientific classification
- Kingdom: Plantae
- Clade: Tracheophytes
- Clade: Angiosperms
- Clade: Magnoliids
- Order: Laurales
- Family: Lauraceae
- Genus: Sassafras; J.Presl

Species
- Sassafras albidum (Nutt.) Nees; †Sassafras ashleyi; †Sassafras columbiana; †Sassafras hesperia; Sassafras randaiense (Hayata) Rehder; Sassafras tzumu (Hemsl.) Hemsl.; †Sassafras yabei

Synonyms
- Euosmus (Nutt.) Rchb.; Pseudosassafras Lecomte; Yushunia Kamik.

= Sassafras =

Sassafras Temporal range: Maastrichtian–recent, 70–0 Ma Possible Albian record

Genus of trees

Sassafras is a genus of three extant and one extinct species of deciduous trees in the family Lauraceae, native to eastern North America and eastern Asia. The genus is distinguished by its aromatic properties, which have made the tree useful to humans.

== Description ==
Sassafras trees grow from 9–35 metres (30–115 feet) tall with many slender sympodial branches and smooth, orange-brown bark or yellow bark. All parts of the plants are fragrant. The species are unusual in having three distinct leaf patterns on the same plant: unlobed oval, bilobed (mitten-shaped), and trilobed (three-pronged); the leaves are hardly ever five-lobed. Three-lobed leaves are more common in Sassafras tzumu and S. randaiense than in their North American counterparts, although three-lobed leaves often occur on S. albidum. The young leaves and twigs are quite mucilaginous and produce a citrus-like scent when crushed. The tiny, yellow flowers are generally six-petaled; S. albidum and (the extinct) S. hesperia are dioecious, with male and female flowers on separate trees, while S. tzumu and S. randaiense have male and female flowers occurring on the same trees. The fruit is a drupe, blue-black when ripe.

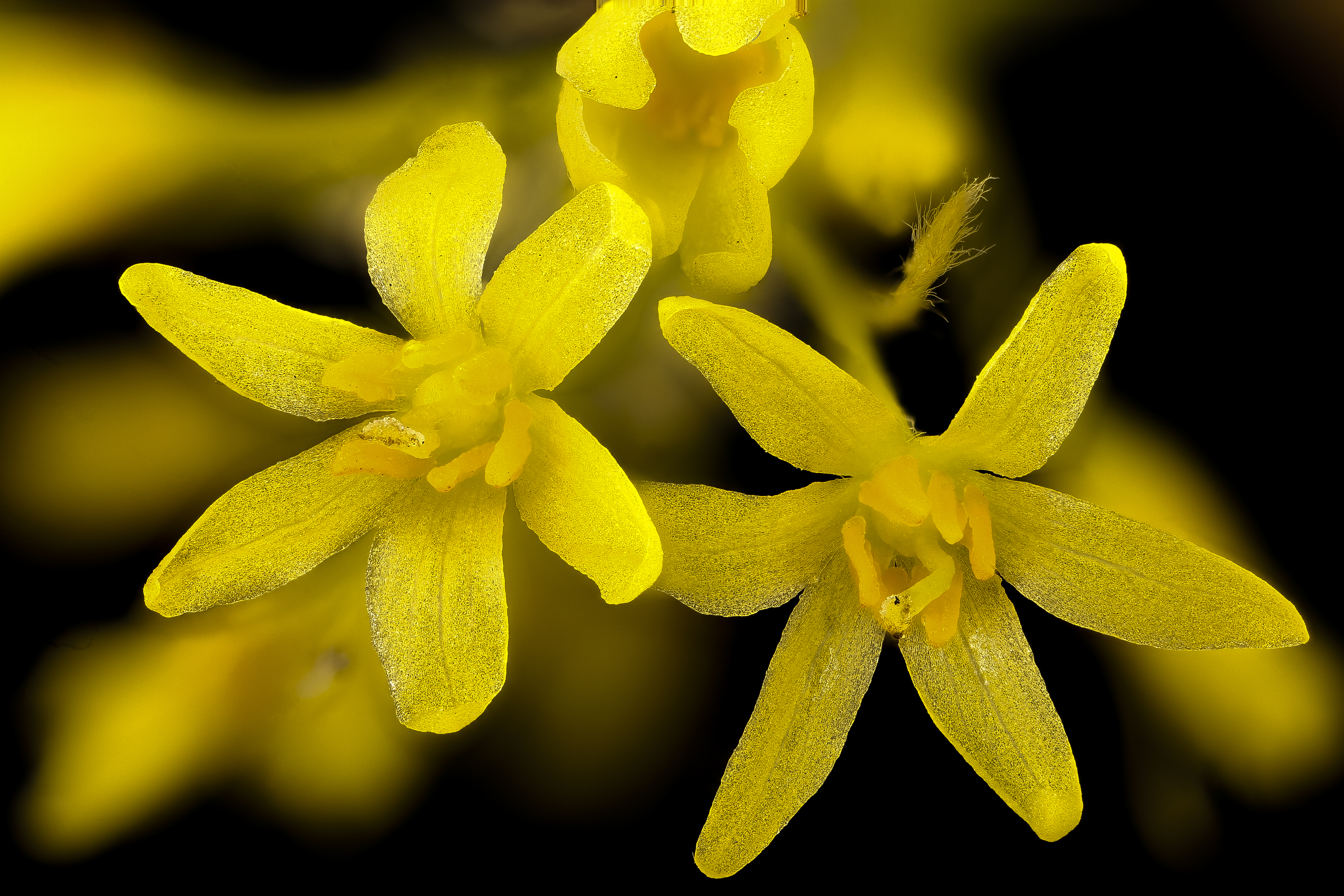
Pistillate (female) flowers

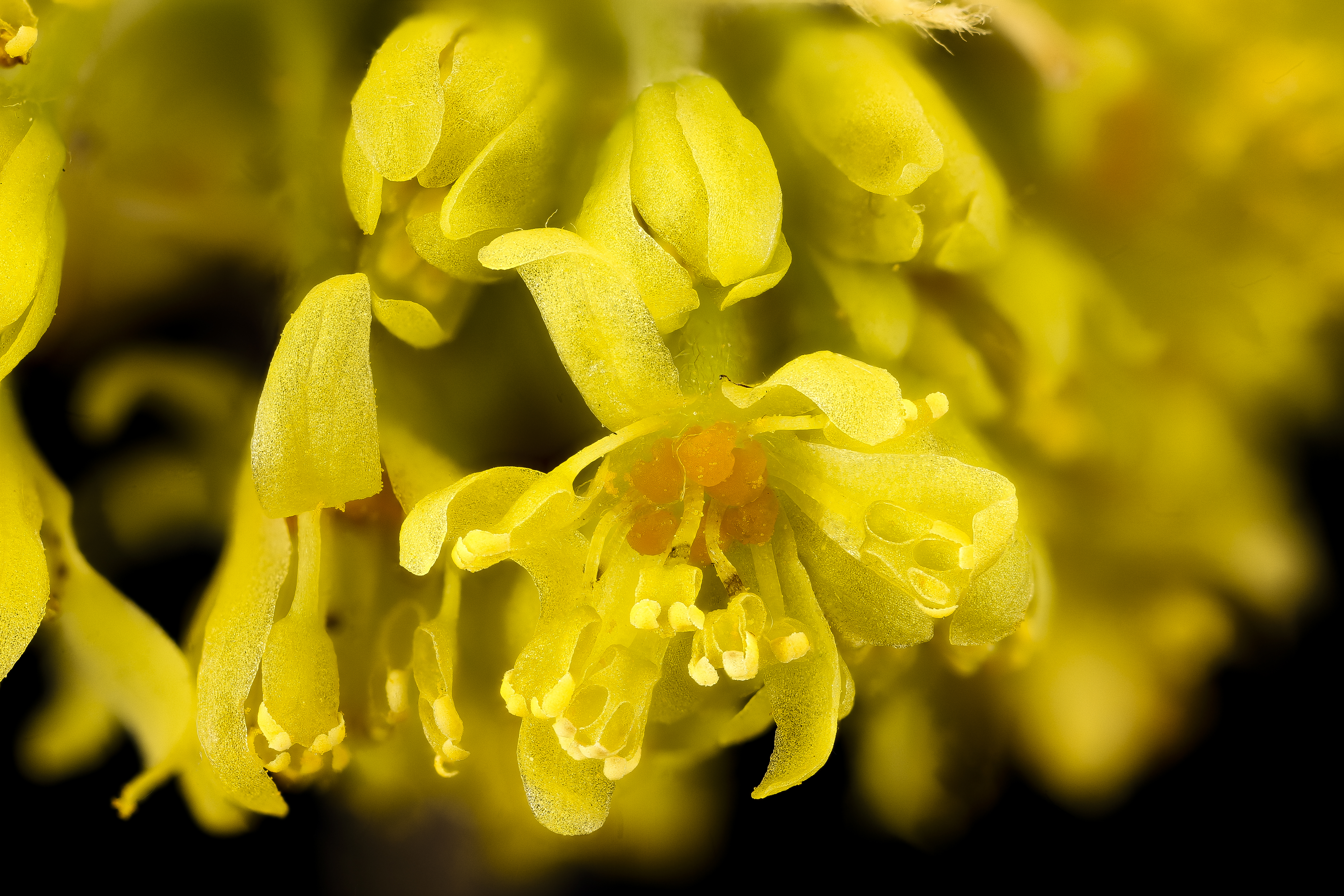
Staminate (male) flowers

The largest known sassafras tree in the world is in Owensboro, Kentucky, and is over 30 m (100 ft) high and 6.4 m (21 ft) in circumference.

== Taxonomy ==
The genus Sassafras was first described by the Bohemian botanist Jan Presl in 1825. The name "sassafras", applied by the botanist Nicolas Monardes in 1569, comes from the French sassafras. Some sources claim it originates from the Latin saxifraga or saxifragus: "stone-breaking"; saxum "rock" + frangere ("to break"). Sassafras trees are not within the family Saxifragaceae.

Early European colonists reported that the plant was called winauk by Native Americans in Delaware and Virginia and pauane by the Timucua. Native Americans distinguished between white sassafras and red sassafras, terms which referred to different parts of the same plant but with distinct colors and uses. Sassafras was known as fennel wood (German Fenchelholz) due to its distinctive aroma.

=== Species ===
The genus Sassafras includes four species, three extant and one extinct. Sassafras plants are endemic to North America and East Asia, with two species in each region that are distinguished by some important characteristics, including the frequency of three-lobed leaves (more frequent in East Asian species) and aspects of their sexual reproduction (North American species being dioecious).

Taiwanese sassafras, Taiwan, is treated by some botanists in a distinct genus as Yushunia randaiensis (Hayata) Kamikoti, though this is not supported by recent genetic evidence, which shows Sassafras to be monophyletic.

==== Brazil ====
Ocotea pretiosa is raised in Brazil for the commercial production of the essential oil.

==== North America ====
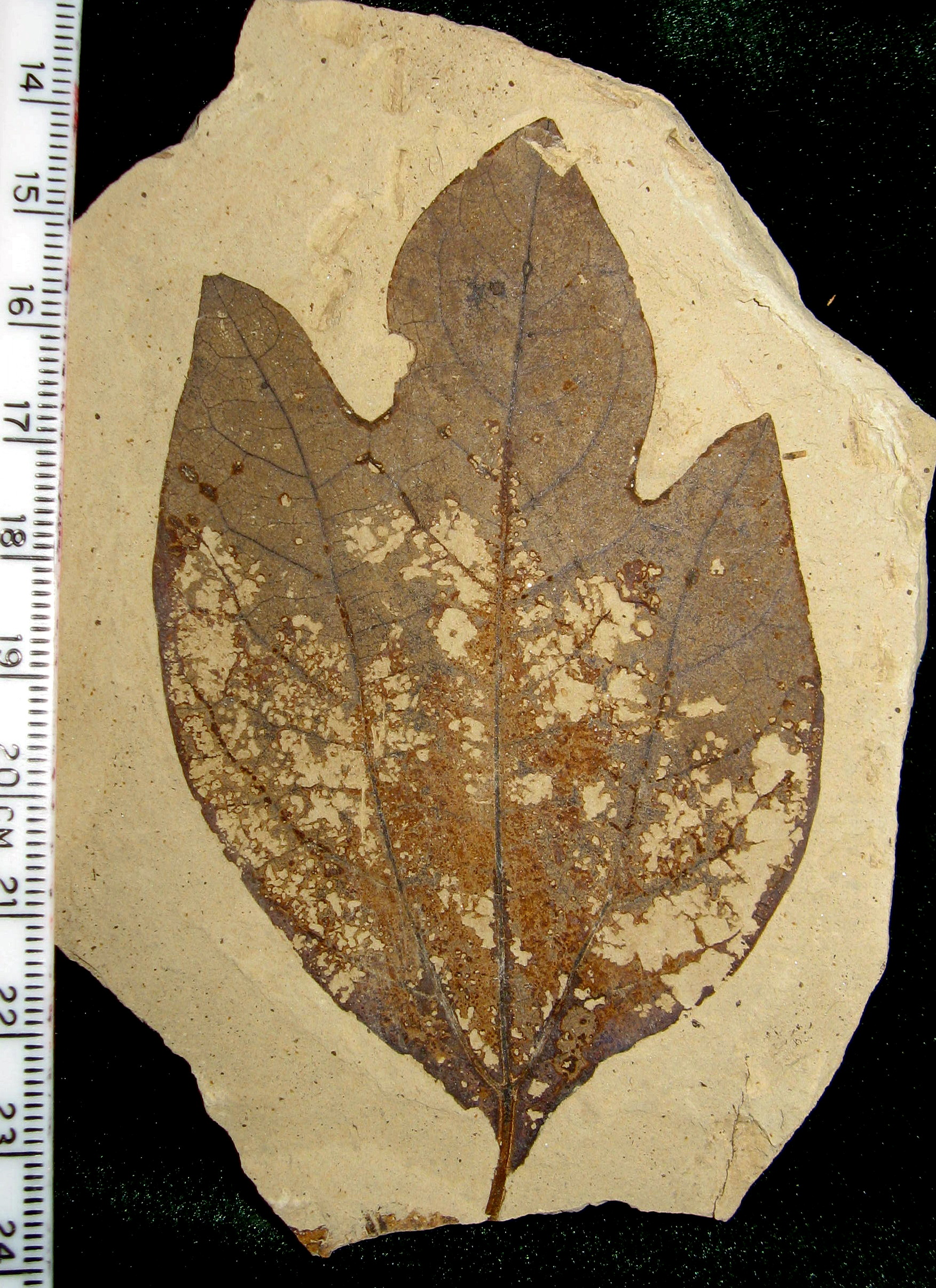
Fossil Sassafras hesperia leaf from Early Ypresian, Klondike Mountain Formation, Washington, US

- Sassafras albidum (Nuttall) Nees – sassafras, white sassafras, red sassafras, or silky sassafras, eastern North America, from southernmost Ontario, Canada through the eastern United States, south to central Florida, and west to southern Iowa and East Texas, formerly, Wisconsin
- †Sassafras hesperia (Berry) – western North American, from the Eocene Klondike Mountain Formation of Washington and British Columbia; extinct, known only from fossils.

==== East Asia ====
- Sassafras tzumu (Hemsl.) Hemsl. – Chinese sassafras or tzumu, central and southwestern China
- Sassafras randaiense (Hayata) Rehd. – Taiwan

== Distribution and habitat ==
Many Lauraceae are aromatic, evergreen trees or shrubs adapted to high rainfall and humidity, but the genus Sassafras is deciduous. Deciduous sassafras trees lose all of their leaves for part of the year, depending on variations in rainfall. In deciduous tropical Lauraceae, leaf loss coincides with the dry season in tropical, subtropical and arid regions.

Sassafras is commonly found in open woods, along fences, or in fields. It grows well in moist, well-drained, or sandy loam soils and tolerates a variety of soil types, attaining a maximum in southern and wetter areas of distribution.

Sassafras albidum ranges from southern Maine and southern Ontario west to Iowa, and south to central Florida and eastern Texas, in North America. S. tzumu may be found in Anhui, Fujian, Guangdong, Guangxi, Guizhou, Hubei, Hunan, Jiangsu, Sichuan, Yunnan, and Zhejiang, China. S. randaiense is native to Taiwan.

== Ecology ==
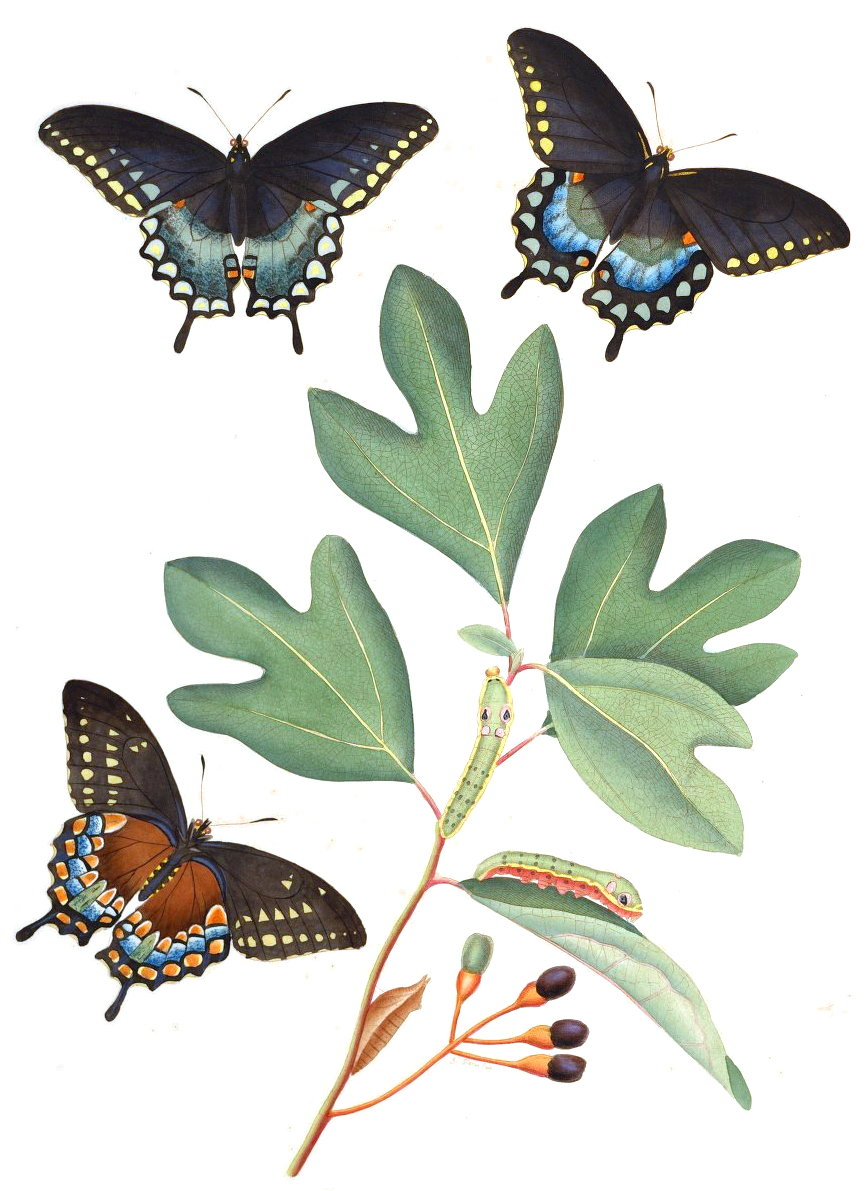
S. albidum is a host plant for the spicebush swallowtail.

The leaves, bark, twigs, stems, and fruits are eaten by birds and mammals in small quantities. For most animals, sassafras is not consumed in large enough quantities to be important, although it is an important deer food in some areas. Carey and Gill rate its value to wildlife as fair, their lowest rating. Sassafras leaves and twigs are consumed by white-tailed deer and porcupines. Other sassafras leaf browsers include groundhogs, marsh rabbits, and American black bears. Rabbits eat sassafras bark in winter. American beavers will cut sassafras stems. Sassafras fruits are eaten by many species of birds, including bobwhite quail, eastern kingbirds, great crested flycatchers, phoebes, wild turkeys, gray catbirds, northern flickers, pileated woodpeckers, downy woodpeckers, thrushes, vireos, and northern mockingbirds. Some small mammals also consume sassafras fruits.

== Toxicity ==
Sassafras oil contains safrole, which may have a carcinogenic effect. Long-term pharmacological studies in the laboratories of the Food and Drug Administration, demonstrated safrole, which is also the principal component of oil of sassafras, to be a carcinogen. The scientific data were carefully reviewed by a group of scientists made up of representatives of government and representatives from a panel recommended by the National Academy of Sciences. This group concluded that safrole is to be classed as a weak hepatic carcinogen.

== Uses ==
All parts of sassafras plants, including roots, stems, twig leaves, bark, flowers, and fruit, have been used for culinary, medicinal, and aromatic purposes, both in areas where they are endemic and in areas where they were imported, such as Europe. The wood of sassafras trees has been used as a material for building ships and furniture in China, Europe, and the United States, and sassafras played an important role in the history of the European colonization of the Americas in the 16th and 17th centuries. Sassafras twigs have been used as toothbrushes and fire starters.

=== Culinary ===
Sassafras albidum is an important ingredient in some distinct foods of the US. It has been the main ingredient in traditional root beers and sassafras root teas, and the ground leaves of sassafras are a distinctive additive in Louisiana's Cajun cuisine. Sassafras is used in filé powder, a common thickening and flavoring agent in Louisiana gumbo. Methods of cooking with sassafras combine this ingredient native to America with traditional North American and European culinary techniques; they contribute to the unique Creole cuisine, which is heavily influenced by the blend of cultures in Louisiana and other states along the Gulf coast.

Sassafras, once a key ingredient in commercial American root beers, is no longer used, as its oil was banned in 1960 by the US Food and Drug Administration (FDA) in all commercially mass-produced foods and medications. The FDA's directive was in response to health concerns about the carcinogenicity of safrole, a major constituent of sassafras oil, in animal studies.

Sassafras leaves and flowers have also been used in salads, and to flavor fats or cure meats. The young twigs can also be eaten fresh or dried. Additionally, the subterranean portion of the plant can be peeled, dried and boiled to make tea.

=== Traditional medicine ===
Numerous Native American tribes used the leaves of sassafras to treat wounds by rubbing the leaves directly into a wound and used different parts of the plant for many medicinal purposes such as treating acne, urinary disorders, and sicknesses that increased body temperature, such as high fevers. East Asian types of sassafras such as S. tzumu (chu mu) and S. randaiense (chu shu) are used in Chinese medicine to treat rheumatism and trauma. Some modern researchers conclude that the oil, roots and bark of sassafras have analgesic and antiseptic properties. Different parts of the sassafras plant (including the leaves and stems, the bark, and the roots) have been used to treat scurvy, skin sores, kidney problems, toothaches, rheumatism, swelling, menstrual disorders, sexually transmitted diseases, bronchitis, hypertension, and dysentery. It is also used as a fungicide, dentifrice, rubefacient, diaphoretic, perfume, carminative and sudorific. Before the twentieth century, Sassafras enjoyed a great reputation in the medical literature, but became valued for its power to improve the flavor of other medicines.

Sassafras root was an early export from North America, as early as 1609.

Sassafras wood and oil were both used in dentistry. Early toothbrushes were crafted from sassafras twigs or wood because of its aromatic properties. Sassafras was also used as an early dental anesthetic and disinfectant.

=== Wood ===
Sassafras albidum is often grown as an ornamental tree for its unusual leaves and aromatic scent. Outside of its native area, it is occasionally cultivated in Europe and elsewhere. The durable and beautiful wood of sassafras plants has been used in shipbuilding and furniture-making in North America, in Asia, and in Europe (once Europeans were introduced to the plant). Sassafras wood was also used by Native Americans in the southeastern United States as a fire-starter because of the flammability of its natural oils found within the wood and the leaves.

=== Oil and aroma ===
Chemical structure of safrole, the dominant component of sassafras oil.

Steam distillation of dried root bark produces an essential oil which has a high safrole content. The oil can also contain significant amounts of camphor, eugenol (including 5-methoxyeugenol), asarone, and various sesquiterpenes). Many other trees contain similarly high percentages and their extracted oils are sometimes referred to as sassafras oil, which once was extensively used as a fragrance in perfumes and soaps, food and for aromatherapy. An estimated 1500 tons were produced around the year 2015.

Safrole is a precursor for the clandestine manufacture of the drugs MDA and MDMA, and as such, sales and import of sassafras oil (as a safrole-containing mixture of above-threshold concentration) are restricted in the US.

Sassafras oil is also an insect or pest deterrent. It is a component of liqueurs such as the opium-based Godfrey's Cordial and in homemade liquor to mask strong or unpleasant smells. Sassafras oil has also been added to soap and other toiletries. It is banned in the United States for use in commercially mass-produced foods and drugs by the FDA as a potential carcinogen.

=== Commercial use ===
For a more detailed description of uses by indigenous peoples of North America, and a history of the commercial use of Sassafras albidum by Europeans in the United States in the 16th and 17th centuries, see the article on the extant North American species of sassafras, Sassafras albidum.

In modern times, the sassafras plant has been grown and harvested for the extraction of sassafras oil. It is used in a variety of commercial products or their syntheses, such as the insecticide synergistic compound piperonyl butoxide. These plants are primarily harvested for commercial purposes in Asia and Brazil.
