= Filé powder =

Spicy herb in Louisiana Creole cuisine

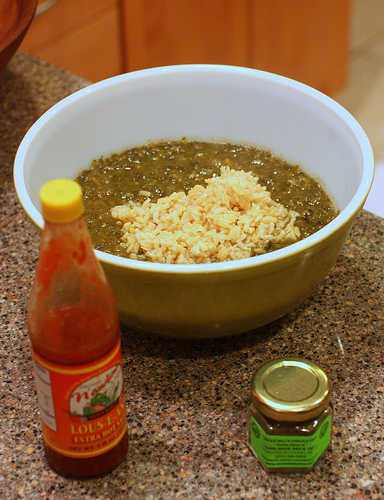
Gumbo z'herbes, including hot sauce and filé

Filé powder, also called gumbo filé, is an herb seasoning made from the dried and ground leaves of the North American sassafras tree (Sassafras albidum).

== Culinary use ==
Filé powder is used in Louisiana Creole cuisine in the making of some types of gumbo, a thick Creole soup or stew often served over rice. Several different varieties exist. In New Orleans, what is known as Creole gumbo generally varies from house to house though still retaining its Native American origins. The Creoles of Cane River make a gumbo focused much more on filé. Filé can provide thickening when okra is not in season, in types of gumbo that use okra or roux as a thickener for gumbo instead of filé. Sprinkled sparingly over gumbo as a seasoning and a thickening agent, filé powder adds a distinctive, earthy flavor and texture.

Filé powder is made by harvesting the young leaves and stems of the sassafras tree and grinding them. Filé powder is generally not added until after the vegetables and meats or seafood are finished cooking and removed from the heat source.

== History and etymology ==
Choctaw Native Americans of the American South (Florida, Mississippi, Alabama, Louisiana) were the first to use dried, ground sassafras leaves as a seasoning. The French word filé is the past participle of the verb filer, meaning (among other things) "to turn into threads", "to become ropy".

The name gumbo may derive from the word ki ngombo, often shortened to gombo, which meant okra in the Central Bantu dialect. Okra was a common thickener in soups and stews prepared by the African inhabitants of Louisiana, who were brought to the colony in large numbers beginning in 1719.

Some scholars have suggested that gumbo was adapted from the West African soups and stews which were thickened with okra. Eventually, okra was replaced as a thickener with the traditional sassafras. The earliest known mention of the dish is from a transcript of the interrogation of an enslaved African woman named Comba in 1764. In it, she states that she gave "un gombeau" to another slave.

Other scholars have suggested that the name may derive from the Choctaw word for filé (kombo). Some early 20th century authors, most notably Celestine Eustis, suggested that gumbo including filé powder was an early special-occasion dish for native tribes. This is further implied by a late 18th-century Creole practice. At that time, rice was a luxury for many Creoles. They served gumbo over corn grits, a pairing common in the stews of native tribes.

== Health concerns ==
The sassafras plant contains safrole, which has been banned by the United States Food and Drug Administration as a carcinogen since 1960. The plant, as well as the oil derived from it, cannot be used in food manufacture for this reason. According to a study published in 1997, sassafras leaves (from which filé is produced) do not contain detectable amounts of safrole.

== Cultural references ==
"Filé gumbo" is famously mentioned in the classic country song by Hank Williams Sr., "Jambalaya (On the Bayou)", which held the number-one position on the U.S. country music charts for fourteen non-consecutive weeks in 1952. It was also mentioned in the song by Gene Watson, "Love in the Hot Afternoon", which was a #3 country hit for the singer in 1975.
