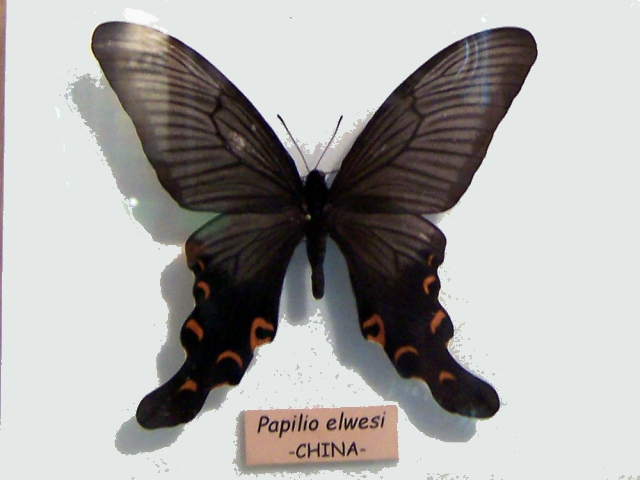

Scientific classification
- Kingdom: Animalia
- Phylum: Arthropoda
- Clade: Pancrustacea
- Class: Insecta
- Order: Lepidoptera
- Family: Papilionidae
- Genus: Papilio
- Species: P. elwesi

Binomial name
- Papilio elwesi Leech, 1889

= Papilio elwesi =

Species of butterfly

Papilio elwesi is a butterfly of the family Papilionidae. The species is endemic to China and Vietnam.

Papilio elwesi (along with P. maraho) differs from all other Papilio species in the tail of the hindwing being so dilated that two veins are necessary to support it. Together these two species form the subgenus Agehana.The forewings are dark grey with black veins. The hindwings are elongated and terminated by broad tails. They are dark grey with black veins and bear a series of submarginal pinkish-red lunulae. The body is black. The first four larval instars look like bird droppings. The mature caterpillar mimics a snake's head.

The larvae feed on Lauraceae species.

== Etymology ==
It is named for British botanist, entomologist, author, lepidopterist, collector and traveller, Henry John Elwes.
