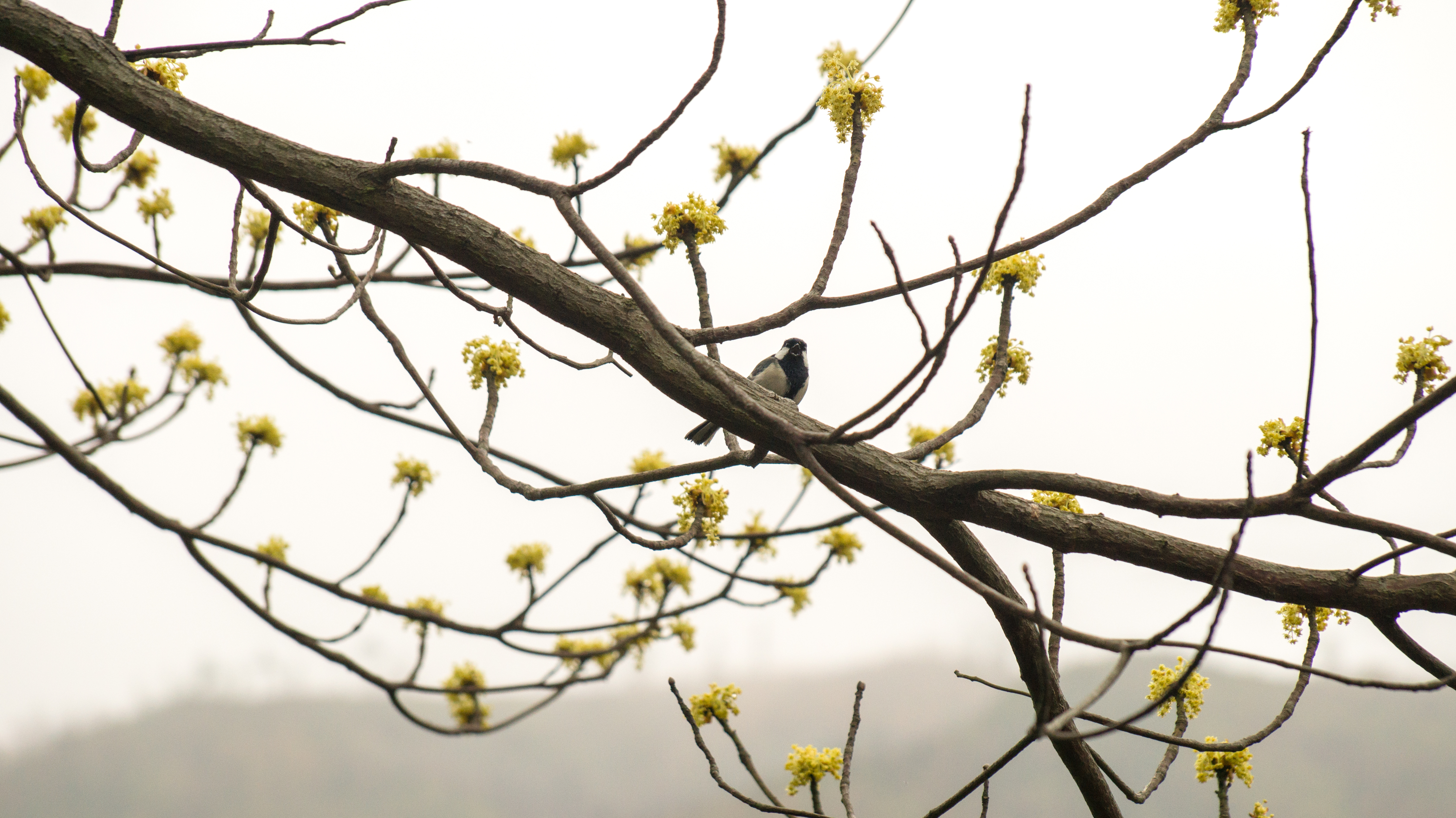
- Sassafras tzumu, Zhejiang, China

Conservation status
- Least Concern (IUCN 3.1)

Scientific classification
- Kingdom: Plantae
- Clade: Tracheophytes
- Clade: Angiosperms
- Clade: Magnoliids
- Order: Laurales
- Family: Lauraceae
- Genus: Sassafras
- Species: S. tzumu

Binomial name
- Sassafras tzumu (Hemsl.) Hemsl.

Synonyms
- Lindera camphorata H.Lév.; Lindera tzumu Hemsl.; Litsea laxiflora Hemsl.; Pseudosassafras laxiflora (Hemsl.) Nakai; Pseudosassafras tzumu (Hemsl.) Lecomte

= Sassafras tzumu =

Species of tree

Sassafras tzumu
- Chinese: 檫木
- Literal meaning: sassafras tree
Transcriptions
Standard Mandarin
- Hanyu Pinyin: chámù
- Wade–Giles: chʻa^{2} mu^{4}
Yue: Cantonese
- Jyutping: caat^{3} muk^{6}

Sassafras tzumu (Chinese sassafras, Cha mu) is a species of Sassafras native to southern China, in Anhui, Fujian, Guangdong, Guangxi, Guizhou, Hubei, Hunan, Jiangsu, Sichuan, Yunnan and Zhejiang, and to Vietnam. It grows in either sparse or dense forests habitat types, at elevations of 100–1,900 meters (330–6,230 ft).

== Description ==
Sassafras tzumu is a deciduous tree reaching heights of up to 35 meters (115 feet). The longitudinally fissured wood is colored yellow-green, but changes to gray or brown when the plant is mature. The branching is sympodial. The leaves are alternate, gray-green, ovate or obovate, 9–18 cm long and 6–10 cm broad with 2–7 centimeters, slender, reddish petioles. Leaves may be two-lobed or three-lobed. Flowers are yellow and about 4 millimeters with blue-black and white waxy fruit. One historical source reports trees of up to 100 meters (330 feet), although this is not corroborated by modern sources.

Sassafras tzumu and Sassafras randaiense differ from the North American species in that they may have both male flowers with 3 staminodes and 1 rudimentary pistil, and female flowers with 12 staminodes on the same tree, while the North American species (see Sassafras albidum) are dioecious (individual plants bear only male or only female flowers). Molecular data also supports some differences between the Chinese and North American species. Like those of Sassafras albidum, Sassafras tzumu's leaves may have 2 or 3 lobes, although leaves with 3 lobes occur more frequently in S. tzumu while they are possible but rare in S. albidum.

== Uses ==
The bark of Sassafras tzumu is durable fine-grained and yellow. The wood is used in shipbuilding and furniture making because of its durability. The plant is used for medicinal purposes, to treat rheumatism and trauma. Essential oils may be extracted from bark, roots, or fruit, and contains a 1% concentration of phenylpropene safrole. According to other sources, the bark of Sassafras tzumu contains a particularly large quantity of safrole oil at 97%, making it valuable for those wishing to use the oil for commercial purposes or for the purposes of producing illicit drugs.

== See also ==
- Chinese medicine
- Sassafras albidum
- Sassafras hesperia
- Sassafras randaiense
