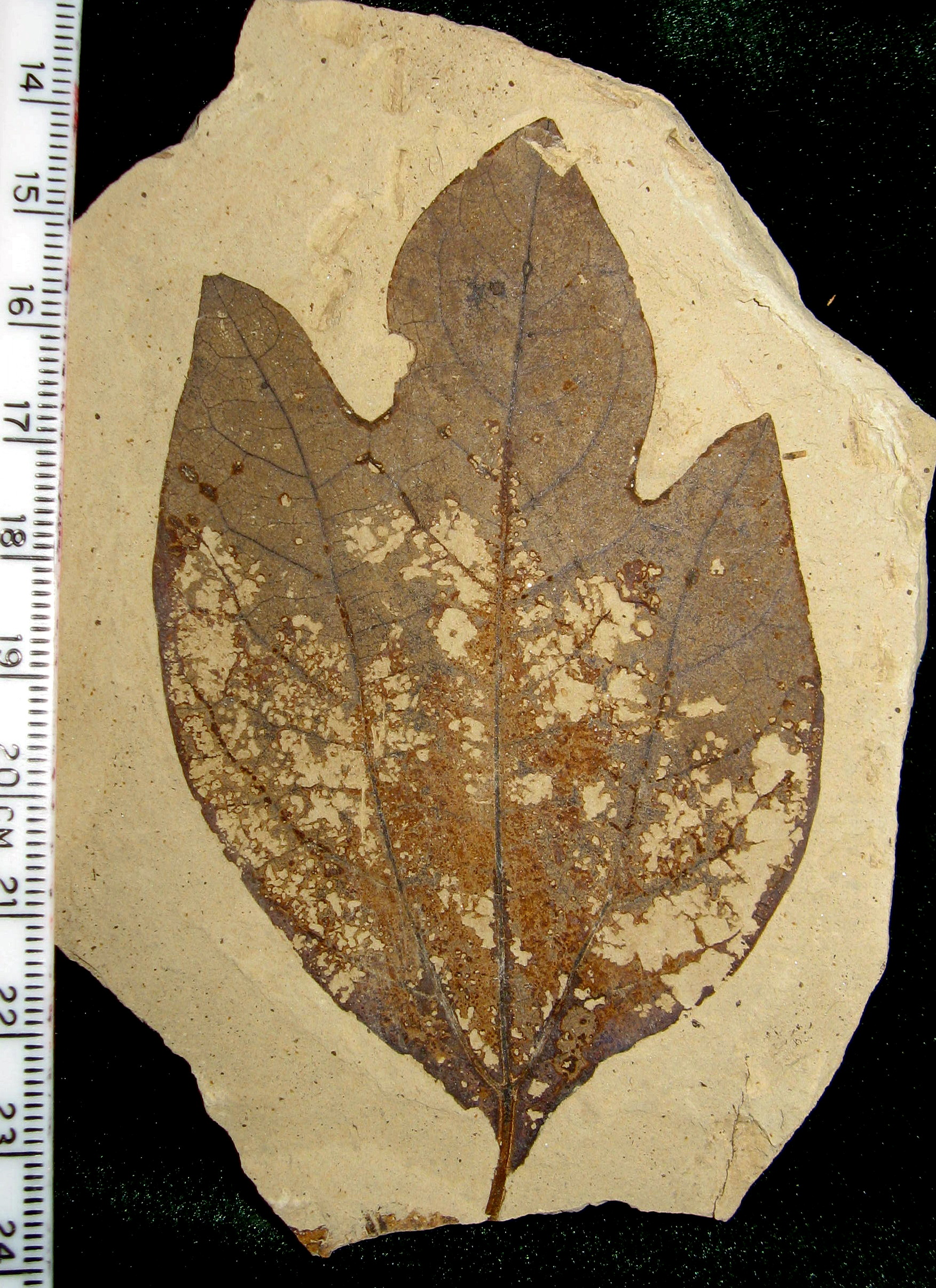
- Sassafras hesperia, Eocene, Washington state

Scientific classification
- Kingdom: Plantae
- Clade: Tracheophytes
- Clade: Angiosperms
- Clade: Magnoliids
- Order: Laurales
- Family: Lauraceae
- Genus: Sassafras
- Species: S. hesperia

Binomial name
- Sassafras hesperia (Berry) Wolfe & Wehr, 1987

Synonyms
- Sassafras selwyni

= Sassafras hesperia =

Extinct species of flowering plant

Sassafras hesperia is an extinct species of flowering plant in the family Lauraceae.

== Distribution ==
The species is known from fossil leaves found in the early Eocene, Ypresian stage, Klondike Mountain Formation deposits of northern Washington state, United States and similar aged formations in British Columbia, Canada, including the Allenby Formation near Princeton, the McAbee Fossil Beds near Kamloops and Driftwood Canyon Provincial Park near Smithers. S. hesperia is related to three modern species, S. albidum, which is native to the eastern United States, S. tzumu native to central China, and S. randaiense native to Taiwan. The modern species form a noted disjunct distribution.

== History ==
The original type description of the new species by paleobotanist Edward W. Berry, based on a compression fossil leaf specimen, was published in 1929. When first published the holotype specimen's type locality was misidentified as being part of the Latah Formation of Spokane. Roland W. Brown (1937) corrected the type locality to the older Republic area strata, but occasional confusion as to the species age still occurred: notably Daniel I. Axelrod (1966) in his paper on the Copper Basin flora of Nevada considered the age of S. hesperia as Oligocene.

Working from specimens collected in the Republic, Washington area in the early 1980s, the species was redescribed in 1987 by Jack A. Wolfe and Wesley C. Wehr. Wolfe and Wehr noted S. hesperia to be one of the most common dicots in the Klondike Mountain Formation, that it occurs in the related Princeton and Joseph Creek floras, and in the Thunder Mountain flora of Idaho, of similar age. However they reject the assignment to S. hesperia of the single known Sassafras species leaf from the Eocene Florissant formation. Wolf and Wehr also note that the early Oligocene S. ashleyi is closely related and may have evolved from S. hesperia.

== Description ==
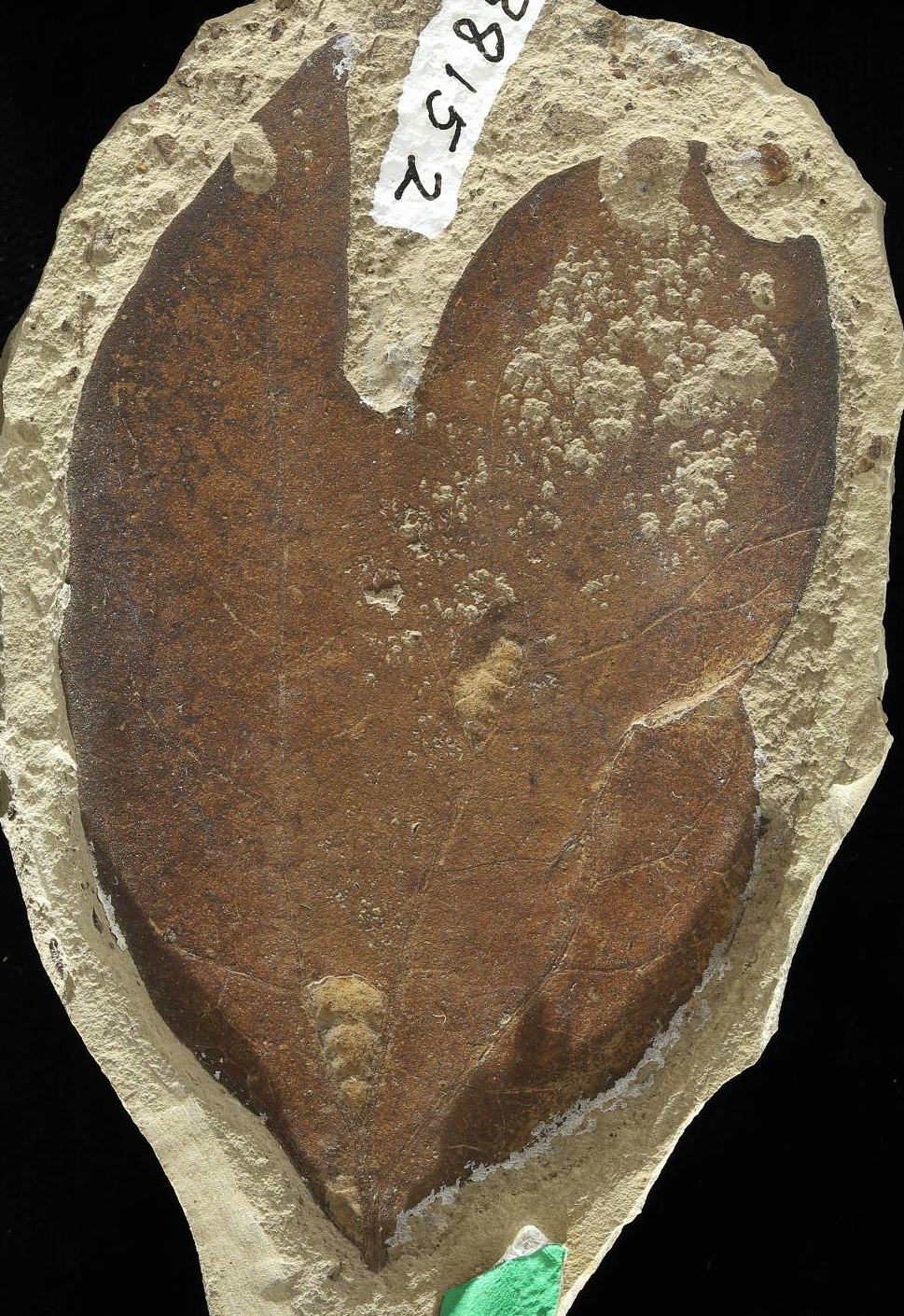
1929 Holotype leaf

Sassafras hesperia leaves are large, with fossils over 13.5 centimetres (5.3 in) known. the species appears to have been possibly evergreen, based on the notably thick leaf remains, thicker than the younger S. ashleyi and S. columbiana. This contrasts with modern Sassafras species, which are deciduous, suggesting that an evergreen state is ancestral in Sassafras.
