= Gumbo =

Louisianan stew

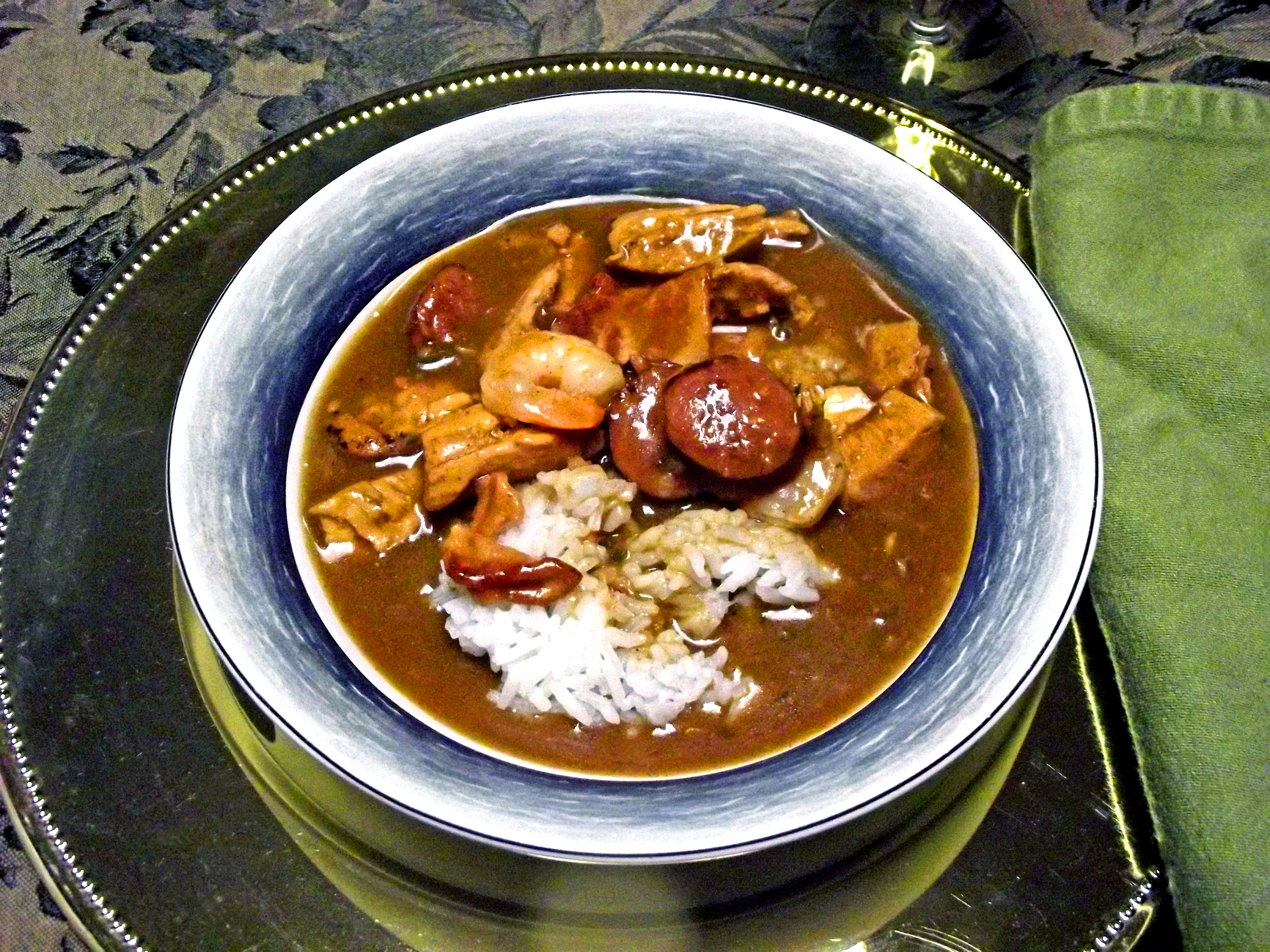
- A bowl of shrimp, chicken and sausage gumbo, served with rice
- Alternative names: Gombo
- Type: Stew
- Place of origin: United States
- Region or state: Louisiana
- Serving temperature: Hot
- Main ingredients: Stock, roux, okra, filé powder, meat or shellfish, celery, onions, bell peppers

Gumbo (Louisiana Creole: Gum-bo) is a stew that is popular among the U.S. Gulf Coast community, the New Orleans stew variation being the official state cuisine of the U.S. state of Louisiana. Gumbo consists primarily of a strongly flavored stock, meat or shellfish (or sometimes both), a thickener, and the Creole "holy trinity": celery, bell peppers, and onions. Gumbo is often categorized by the type of thickener used, whether okra or filé powder (dried and ground sassafras leaves). Gumbo can be made with or without okra or filé powder.

The preferred method in the historical New Orleans variation is with a French-inspired dark, even chocolate-like, roux. The flavors of the dish have origins in many cultures. Creole gumbo generally contains shellfish and a dark roux, filé, or both. Cajun gumbo is generally based on a dark roux and is made with shellfish or fowl. Sausage or ham is often added to gumbos of either variety. After the base is prepared, vegetables are cooked down, and then meat is added. The dish simmers for a minimum of three hours, with shellfish and some spices added near the end. If desired, filé powder is added after the pot is removed from heat. Gumbo is traditionally served with rice. A third, lesser-known variety, the meatless gumbo z'herbes, is essentially a gumbo of slow-cooked greens.

The dish combines ingredients and culinary practices of several cultures, including Central and West African, French, German, Spanish, and Native American Choctaw. Gumbo may have been partially based on the French dish bouillabaisse, West African okra stew or Choctaw stew. Most likely all of these dishes contributed to the original recipe. It was first described in 1802, and was listed in various cookbooks in the latter half of the 19th century. The dish gained more widespread popularity in the 1970s, after the United States Senate dining room added it to the menu in honor of Louisiana Senator Allen Ellender. The popularity of chef Paul Prudhomme in the 1980s spurred further interest in the dish.

== Etymology ==
The name of the dish comes most likely from Africa, by way of Louisiana French. Scholars and chefs have offered various explanations for the etymology of the word "gumbo". The dish was likely named after one of its two main ingredients, okra or filé. According to linguists, "gumbo" has multiple origins. One origin is the Bambara language of West Africa in which gombo means okra. The other origin is the system of Bantu languages spoken by many enslaved people from Central Africa. The vegetable okra was known as ki ngombo or quingombo in Kimbundu; the word is akin to the Umbundu: ochinggômbo and the Luba-Lulua: chinggômbô "okra". Additionally, the native Choctaw people used filé - dried, ground sassafras - leaves to thicken soups and stews. Some linguists also assert that sassafras were also referred to as komho, while filé were called kombo, or kombo ashish.

== Variations ==
Gumbo is a veritable art form in Louisiana. There are as many gumbo recipes as there are cooks.

— Stir the Pot: The History of Cajun Cuisine, p. 135

Gumbo is a heavily seasoned stew that combines several varieties of meat or seafood with a sauce or gravy. Any combination of meat or seafood can be used. Meat-based gumbo may consist of chicken, duck, squirrel, or rabbit, with oysters occasionally added. Seafood-based gumbo generally has shrimp, crab meat, and sometimes oysters. Andouille sausage is often added to both meat and seafood gumbos to provide "piquancy, substance, and an additional layer of flavor" to the dish. The key is to use a tender andouille so it does not become too chewy." Most varieties of gumbo are seasoned with onions, bell pepper, and celery. Tomatoes are sometimes used in seafood gumbo, but traditionally few other vegetables are included.

=== Thickeners ===
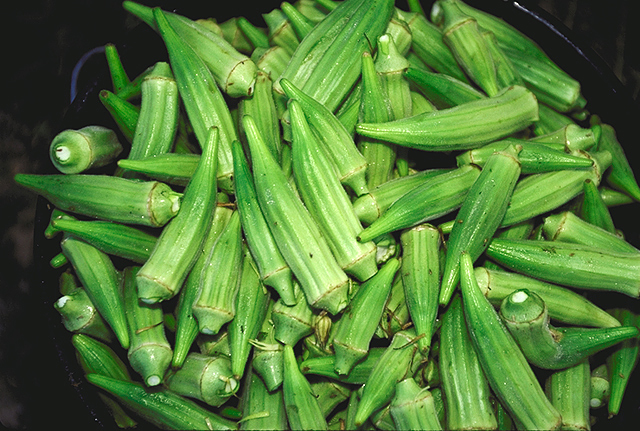
Okra pods

Gumbo broth or gravy derives from three primary thickeners: okra, filé powder, and roux. Traditionally, okra and filé powder are not used in the same dish, although this rule is sometimes broken. Roux can be used alone or in conjunction with either of the other thickeners. Okra is more often used as a thickener in seafood gumbos than those with meat. This mucilaginous vegetable is usually cooked first, and other ingredients added once the desired consistency is reached. According to The Oxford Companion to Food, okra-based gumbos are becoming less popular, as the okra texture has become less palatable to changing tastes.

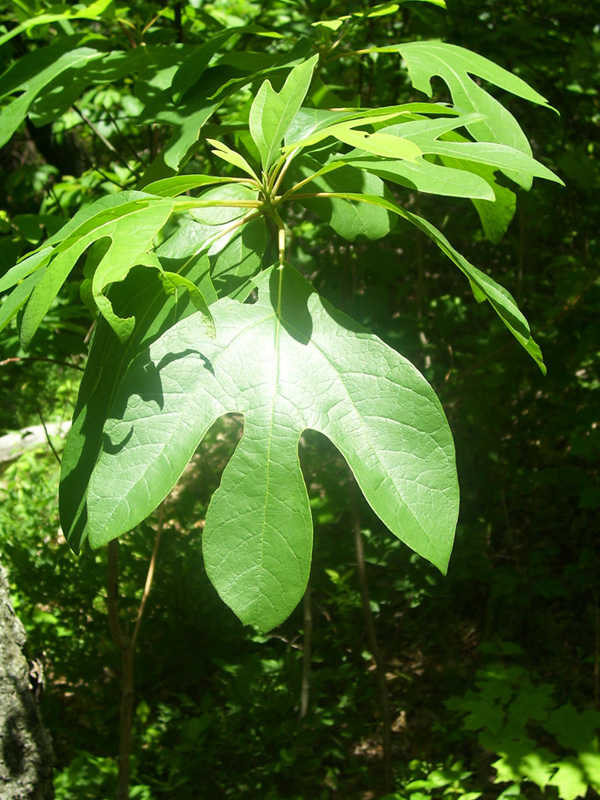
Sassafras leaves, source of filé powder

Ground sassafras leaf, known as filé, is generally not added to the gravy until after the vegetables and meats or seafood have finished cooking and have been removed from the heat source. Many Cajuns add it at the table rather than in the pot. If added during the boiling process, filé makes the gumbo too ropey; when added at the end, the gumbo gains a slightly stringy texture.

Roux has become the most popular thickener, made from cooking together a roughly equal proportion of flour and fat (traditionally hog lard, although increasingly made with butter since the mid-20th century). The length of cooking time determines the final flavor and texture, since the longer the roux is cooked before being added to the gumbo, the darker it becomes and the less thickening power it retains. A very dark roux provides a much thinner sauce with a more intense flavor than a light roux.

=== Cajun vs. Creole gumbo ===
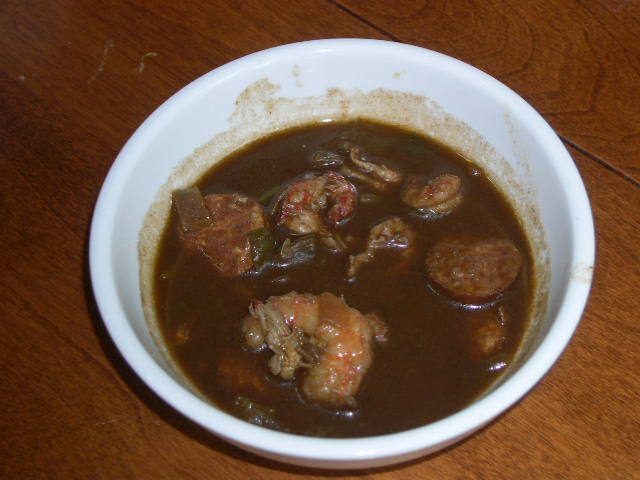
Cajun seafood gumbo

Gumbo is typically divided into two varieties. Combinations traditionally common in New Orleans and southeastern Louisiana are known as "Creole" after the Louisiana Creole people, descendants of the area's French, Spanish, and Enslaved Africans. "Cajun" combinations were common in southwestern Louisiana, which was populated primarily by Cajuns, descendants of the French-speaking settlers expelled from Acadia (located within the modern-day Canadian provinces of Quebec, Nova Scotia, New Brunswick and Prince Edward Island) in the mid-18th century.

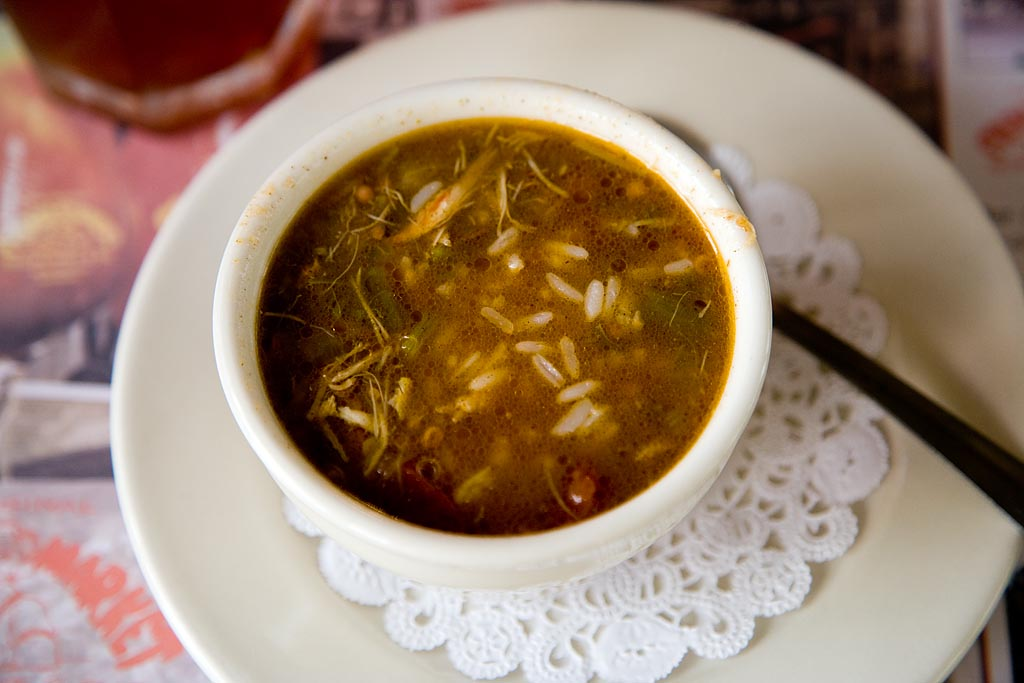
Creole seafood gumbo

Gumbo is usually identified by its dark roux, cooked until it is a color "a few shades from burning". The roux is used with okra or filé powder. Seafood is popular in gumbo the closer to the coast the people are, but the southwestern areas of Louisiana often use fowl, such as chicken or duck, and sausage. The fowl is generally not deboned, and onions, celery, and bell pepper are not strained out of the dish. Cajun gumbo is sometimes topped with parsley and green onions.

Creole gumbo most often consists of seafood, tomatoes, and a thickener. Before the latter half of the 20th century, celery was rarely used in Creole gumbo.

=== Gumbo z'herbes ===
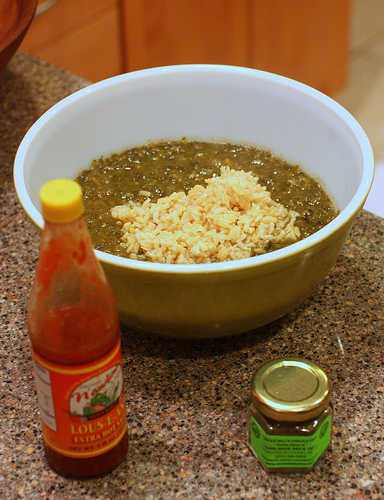
Gumbo z'herbes, served with filé powder and hot sauce

When Catholics were expected to abstain from eating meat during Lent, a meatless variety of gumbo, known as gumbo z'herbes (from gumbo aux herbes, or "gumbo of greens"), was often served. This variety combined varied greens – typically including turnips, mustard greens, and spinach. The greens were cooked to mush and strained through a sieve to produce a thick green liquid. Preparation for this variety of gumbo was time-consuming, and as Lenten restrictions have relaxed, the dish has become less popular. It is very rarely served in restaurants. In modern times, ham or crabmeat is occasionally added to this type of gumbo.

Gumbo z'herbes may have originated with the French/Spanish/West Africans. It has similarities to the French dish potage aux herbes ("soup with greens"), as well as to the Afro-Caribbean callaloo. The meatless dish also bears striking resemblance to a dish often eaten in Germany on Maundy Thursday. German Catholics, obeying the Lenten rules, often served a stew made of seven different greens on this date.

== History ==
=== Background ===
Gumbo is often used as a metaphor for the mix of cultures that exist in southern Louisiana. The dish combines the culinary practices of Africans, Native Americans, French, and Spanish. In the 18th and 19th centuries, people from these cultures lived within a fairly small area with minimal mobility. In this environment, cultures could influence each other and combine to create new traditions and cuisine.

The dish personifies the word 'Creole'; like its human counterparts, gumbo was born in the New World and took cues from the old but adapted to the new.

— Cynthia Lejeune Nobles

The establishment of Mobile in 1702 marked the beginning of the French colony of Louisiana. French settlers allied with various Native tribes including the Choctaw, Alabama, and Cherokee, from whom they learned new methods of cooking and ways to identify edible indigenous plants.

Slave ships began arriving in Louisiana in 1719. The first ships carried rice and men who were experienced in its cultivation. The grain adapted well to its new environment, and within a few years, rice was commonly grown along the Mississippi River.

In 1721, 125 Germans settled 40 miles (64 km) from New Orleans, and introduced the art of making sausage. By 1746, the white population of Louisiana was estimated to be 3,200, with an estimated 4,730 black people. Enslaved Africans outnumbered whites in most areas of Louisiana for at least the next 40 years.

The colony was transferred from French to Spanish control in 1762. The Spanish government actively recruited settlers for Spanish Louisiana. About 2,000 people from the Canary Islands moved to the area south of New Orleans. These settlers were primarily fishermen who soon began supplying large amounts of shrimp, crab, and oysters to the food markets in New Orleans. The Canary Islanders also brought "a love for well-seasoned food", including use of ground cayenne pepper, a spicy hot red chili pepper. Spanish authorities also granted permission for many French-speaking Acadian exiles to relocate from northeastern North America to Louisiana. From 1755 through 1795, almost 3,000 of these settlers, soon known as Cajuns, moved to the areas south and west of New Orleans. Louisiana was secretly returned to France in 1800, then purchased by the United States in 1803. The southernmost part of territorial Louisiana, including New Orleans, became the state of Louisiana in 1812.

By 1800, the slave trade had introduced new foods to Louisiana, including the African vegetable okra, and hot pepper plants which likely came from Haiti. Onions and bell peppers were long part of cooking in both the Spanish and African traditions. Tomatoes were introduced to the region shortly thereafter.

=== Origin ===
Scholars agree that gumbo originated in Louisiana in the early 18th century, but its uncertain etymology makes it difficult to pinpoint the origins of the food. Although no conclusive evidence exists, cultural markers indicate several plausible scenarios.

As aforementioned, while its exact origins are unknown, gumbo is often believed to be a dish of mixed origins of African, French, Spanish, Native American, but of mostly African origins. Enslaved African Americans often exchanged or combined ingredients in order to make the dish, allowing it to serve as a means of community and identity.

West Africans use the vegetable okra as a base for many dishes, including soups. In Louisiana, gumbo includes ingredients introduced by several cultural groups. Surviving records indicate that by 1764 Africans in New Orleans mixed cooked okra with rice to make a meal.

Gumbo could be a derivation of traditional French soups, particularly the fish stew bouillabaisse. During the cold winters, Acadians generally cooked soups, using whatever ingredients were readily available. When the Acadians moved to Louisiana in the mid-18th century, they were unable to find many of their traditional ingredients, including turnips and cabbage. In this scenario, Acadian colonists substituted local ingredients for those commonly included in the original stew. Instead of the fish, settlers used shellfish. The dish was later modified to include ingredients common in other cultures.

Some culinary experts in the early 20th century, including Celestine Eustis, maintained that gumbo was an early special occasion dish for native tribes. This is further implied by a late 18th-century Cajun practice. At that time, rice was a luxury for many Cajuns. They served gumbo over corn grits, a pairing common in the stews of native tribes. The use of corn and filé powder may imply that the dish was derived from native cuisine.

These theories are intermixed in the local legend of the Frying Pan Revolt, or Petticoat Insurrection. According to legend, in 1722, female French colonists gathered in New Orleans at the home of Governor Jean-Baptiste Le Moyne, Sieur de Bienville, to protest the lack of familiar ingredients. Bienville's housekeeper, Madame Langlois, taught the women how to improve the basic gumbo. Langlois used okra, an ingredient which the women had previously been introduced to by the African people they were enslaving. Spanish and Choctaw introduced ingredients common in Choctaw cuisine – shrimp, crawfish, and filé powder.

=== Development ===
The first written references to gumbo appear in the early 19th century. In 1802, John Sibley described "the dish they call gumbo which is made principally of the ochre into a thick kind of soop [sic] & eat with rice, it is the food of every body for dinner and supper." The following year, French governor Pierre Clement de Laussat hosted a soirée in which 24 different gumbos were prepared. According to author Cynthia Lejeune Nobles, these two events "give clues to gumbo's Spanish colonial popularity and illustrate that the dish could be both humble and refined".

An 1824 cookbook, Mary Randolph's The Virginia House-Wife, was the first to include a recipe for gumbo. Called "Gumbo – A West India Dish", the simple recipe described how to boil okra and bore little resemblance to the stew commonly known as gumbo. The same book contained a recipe for "Ochra Soup" made with okra, onions, fowl, bacon, tomatoes, and lima beans thickened with flour. Although this recipe bore similarities to gumbo, it more closely resembled the Caribbean dish callaloo.

A more familiar version of the dish was described in an 1879 cookbook by Marion Cabell Tyree. Her Housekeeping in Old Virginia described "Gumbo Filit A La Creole", a filé-based gumbo with chicken and oysters and spiced with allspice, cloves, red and black pepper, parsley, and thyme. The 1881 cookbook What Mrs. Fisher Knows About Old Southern Cooking, dictated by former slave Abby Fisher, contained three gumbo recipes. "Oyster Gumbo Soup" used a filé base, while "Ochra Gumbo" and "Chicken Gumbo" used okra as a base. Four years later, the cookbook La Cuisine Creole documented eight varieties of gumbo. None used sausage, but almost all of them contained ham.

Until the 1970s, gumbo was primarily popular on the Gulf Coast of the United States. It gained a broader profile after the death of United States Senator Allen Ellender. A native of Terrebonne Parish, Louisiana, Ellender had often cooked gumbo for his colleagues, including five American presidents. After Ellender died in 1972, the Senate directed that their cafeteria add Louisiana Creole Gumbo, made with seafood, to its menu in his honor. The dish became more widely popular in the 1980s, when chef Paul Prudhomme's popularity spurred interest in Creole and Cajun cooking.

== Preparation and serving ==
Gumbo is cooked for a minimum of three hours, and often simmers all day. Meat (but not seafood) is often browned beforehand and removed from the heat. Okra and roux are cooked before other vegetables and seafood.

According to Nobles, "proper seasoning of gumbo is essential, and in Louisiana adding just the right zing is considered an art". Because seafood cooks fairly quickly, it is not added to the pot until the end of the process. As the gumbo finishes cooking, green onions and parsley are sometimes sprinkled on it. When desired, filé powder is added last.

Creole and Cajun gumbos are served with hot rice, which stretches the quantity of the dish for maximum portion sizes. Gumbo z'herbes is served with rice on the side. Gumbo is almost always served directly from the pot on the stove, although in wealthier or fancier homes the dish might be transferred to a tureen on the table. Often, gumbo and bread are the sole courses in a meal, although many Cajun families provide a side dish of potato salad; an alternate preparation method is to hard boil eggs in the gumbo pot, serving the boiled eggs with the gumbo. Some Cajun families prefer their gumbo served over potato salad instead of rice. Occasionally, gumbo is served as part of a larger menu.

Soniat gives examples of the main types of creole gumbos, along with descriptions of family traditions about them.

== Social aspects ==
A group eating gumbo

In Cajun Foodways, C. Paige Gutierrez describes gumbo as "an economical dish" useful for "feed[ing] a large number of people with a small amount of meat or seafood". Nobles concurs that "one of the hallmarks of gumbo is that, with a big enough pot, it can easily be doubled or tripled and is always a good choice to feed a crowd". With this dish, cooks can use up small portions of various ingredients that were not sufficient for an individual meal. The dish is an efficient way to use up leftover perishable meats and seafood. Gumbo, contrary to popular belief, is good for leftovers if it is frozen or refrigerated within two hours. Also, gumbo made without filé powder stores better because it will not get stringy.

Since the 19th century, gumbo has often been served at social gatherings or other special occasions in Louisiana. Local fais do-do (dance parties) usually provided gumbo beginning at midnight. Many families "have a gumbo", or host a casual social gathering where friends and family chat and enjoy alcoholic beverages and gumbo.

Gumbo is prepared and enjoyed by Louisianians of all races and ethnicities, and its multicultural influences have evolved it through the years. Gumbo is a feature in both urban and rural areas of Louisiana.

In rural Acadiana in southern Louisiana, gumbo is a central feature of Mardi Gras celebrations. On Mardi Gras, local men wander from house to house and beg for gumbo ingredients in an event known as courir de Mardi Gras. Members of the local community then gather in a central location while the men cook the gumbo. When it is ready, the group eats and dances until midnight, when Lent begins.

Gumbo is the official cuisine of the state of Louisiana. Many southern Louisiana cooking competitions center around gumbo, and it is a central feature of many local festivals. The self-described "Gumbo Capital of the World", Bridge City, Louisiana, holds an annual Gumbo Festival. The festival features gumbo cooked in a cast-iron pot 3 ft (0.9 m) deep and 5 feet (1.5 m) in diameter. More commonly, festival gumbo pots measure 2 ft (0.6 m) in depth and diameter.

== See also ==
- Cuisine of New Orleans
- List of regional dishes of the United States
- List of stews
- Soupe Kandia, West African soup

== Bibliography ==
- Bienvenue, Marcelle; Brasseaux, Carl A.; Brasseaux, Ryan A. (2005). Stir the Pot: The History of Cajun Cuisine. Hippocrene Books. ISBN 978-0-7818-1120-0.
- Brasseaux, Carl A. (1987). The Founding of New Acadia. Louisiana State University Press. ISBN 978-0-8071-2099-6.
- Davidson, Alan; Jaine, Tom, eds. (2006). The Oxford Companion to Food. Oxford University Press. ISBN 978-0-19-280681-9.
- Gutierrez, C. Paige (1992). Cajun Foodways. University Press of Mississippi. ISBN 978-0-87805-563-0.
- Hall, Gwendolyn Midlo (1992). Africans in Colonial Louisiana: The Development of Afro-Creole Culture in the Eighteenth Century. Louisiana State University Press. ISBN 978-0-8071-1999-0.
- Nobles, Cynthia Lejeune (2009). "Gumbo". In Tucker, Susan; Starr, S. Frederick (eds.). New Orleans Cuisine: Fourteen Signature Dishes and Their Histories. University Press of Mississippi. ISBN 978-1-60473-127-9.
- Soniat, Leon (1981). La Bouche Creole. Pelican Publishing Company. ISBN 978-0-88289-805-6.
- Theriot, Jude (2009). La Meilleure de la Louisiane: The Best of Louisiana. Cambridge University Press. ISBN 978-1-58980-738-9.
- Usner, Daniel H. Jr. (2000). "The Facility Offered by the Country: The Creolization of Agriculture in the Lower Mississippi Valley". In Buisseret, David; Reinhardt, Steven G. (eds.). Creolization in the Americas. Walter Prescott Webb Memorial Lectures. Texas A&M University Press. ISBN 978-1-58544-101-3.
- Williams, Elizabeth M. (2012). New Orleans: A Food Biography. AltaMira Press. ISBN 978-0-7591-2138-6.
