= Godfrey's Cordial =

Opium-based sedative in Victorian Britain

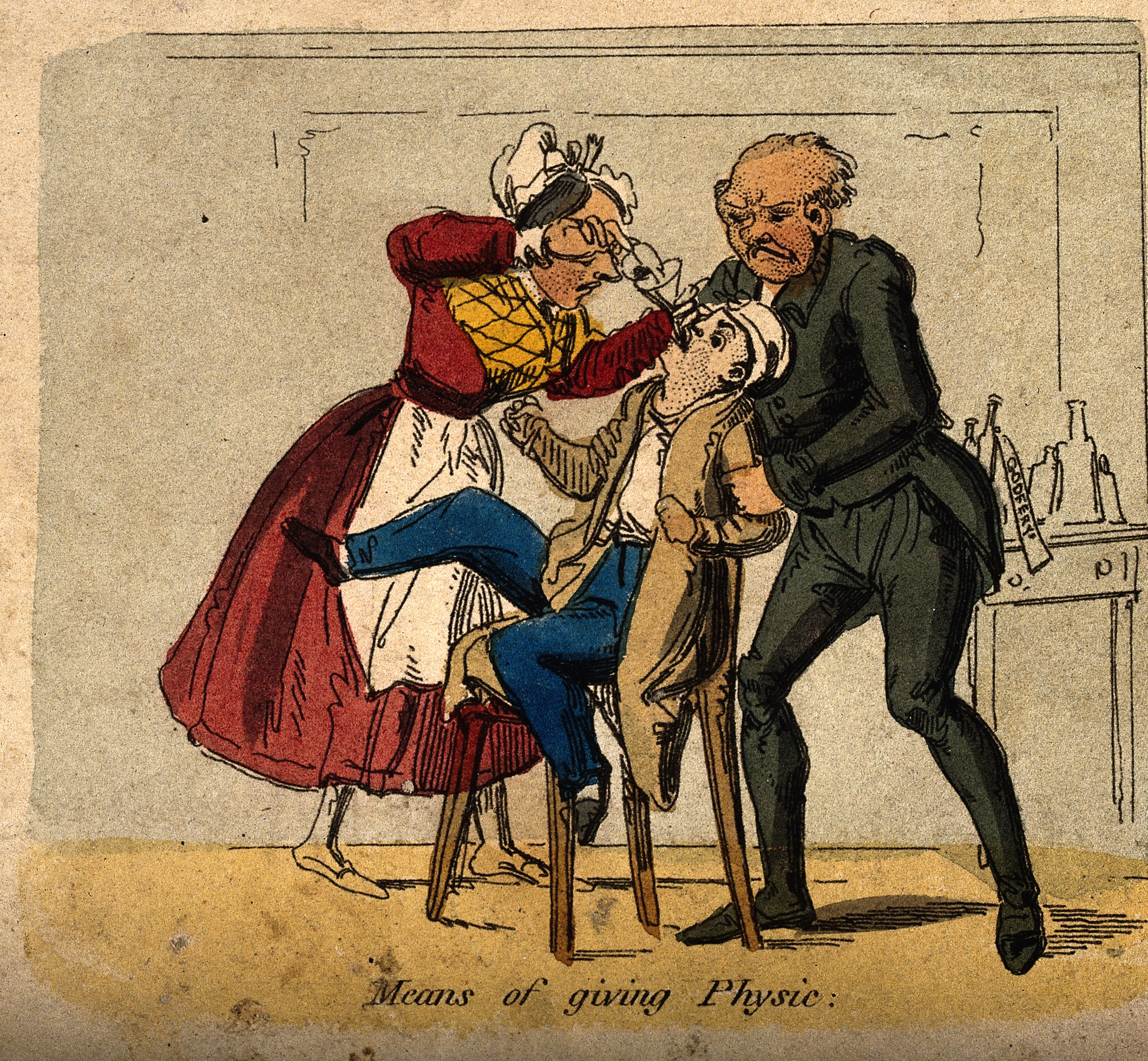
A woman and physician funnelling Godfrey's Cordial into a resisting man

Godfrey's Cordial was a patent medicine, containing laudanum (tincture of opium) in a sweet syrup, which was commonly used as a sedative to quiet infants and children in Victorian England. Used mostly by mothers working in agricultural groups or industry, it ensured that she could work the maximum hours of her employment, without being disturbed by her infant, and thus increased the family income. It was also used by nurses and baby-minders to enable them to neglect their duties if they wished.

== Origin and composition ==
The original formula was named after apothecary Thomas Godfrey of Hunsdon in Hertfordshire. After his death in 1721, without leaving a clear heir to his work, others claimed to have the formula and it was mass-produced across England. Some also ascribed the medicine to Ambroise Hackwitz, also an apothecary, at around the same time, who changed his name to Godfrey and did business in Southampton Row.

Thomas Wakley analysed the formula in 1823, and the ingredients, as he discovered them, were published in The Lancet. They included ginger, rectified spirits of wine, oil of sassafras, tincture of opium and Venice treacle. Other preparations have also been suggested, especially in light of the fact that opium was one of the most adulterated drugs in Victorian England. Godfrey's cordial contained about 1 1/4 grain of opium per ounce apothecaries' system (~0.26% by mass) and was readily available without prescription in England and North America.

== Infant deaths and usage ==
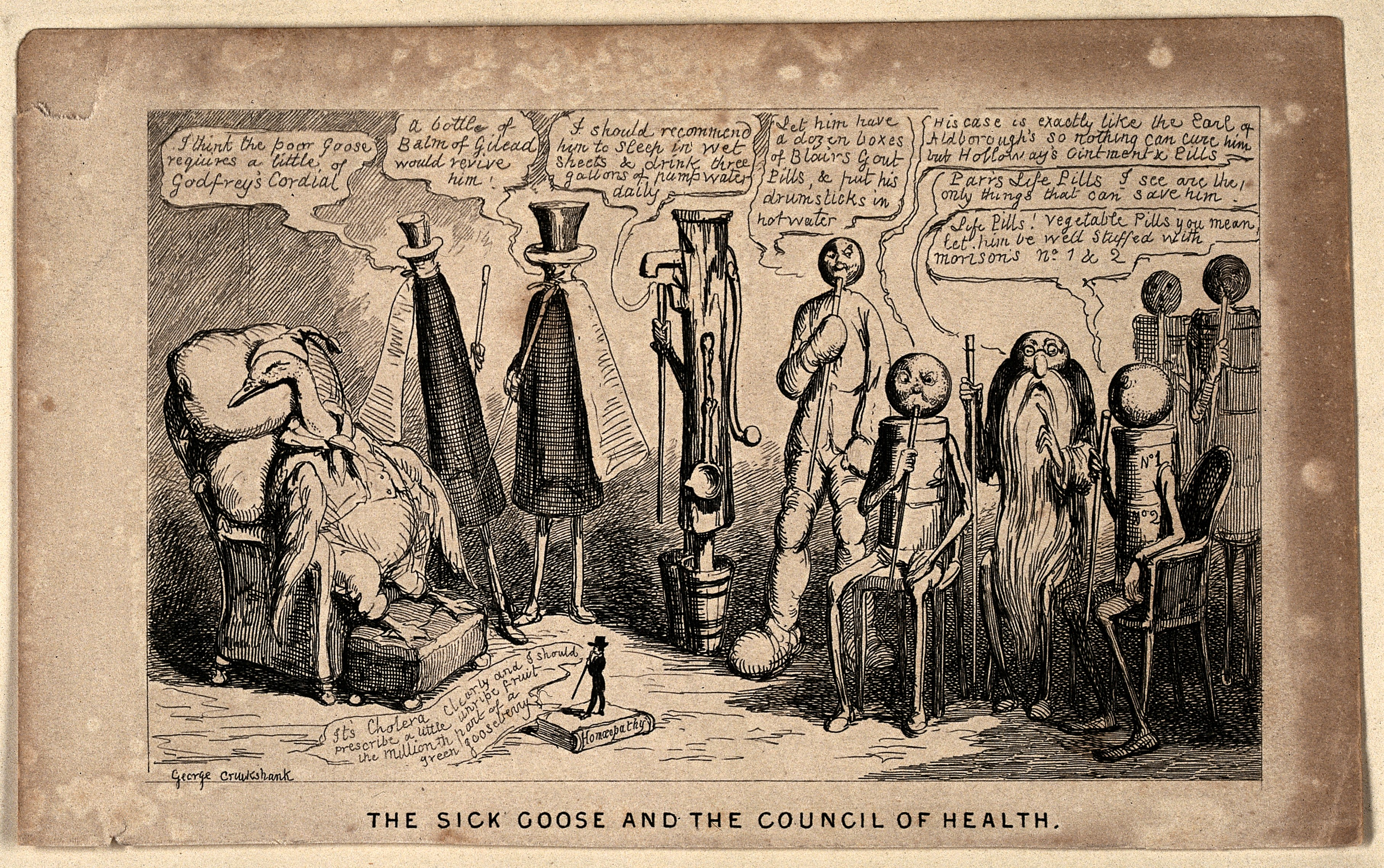
Various quack-cures suggest how they can help an ailing goose – Godfrey's Cordial is at the front of the queue.

Godfrey's cordial had long been recognised as leading to fatal cases of opium poisoning.

However, it continued to be made and used until the early twentieth century, at least in part due to the ease with which it could be manufactured. It was reportedly sold in enormous quantities in eighteenth century England, a time-span that has been popularly referred to as the golden age of physic, due to the widespread availability and consumption of enormous amounts of proprietary medicines. Its low cost and a lack of public knowledge about infant management further increased its popularity.

Though many cases of infant death had been conclusively linked to an indiscriminate use of the medicine by mothers and nurses, exact numbers are hard to ascertain. Those who survived often, reportedly, had a severely damaged physical constitution.

== Decline ==
In 1857, with ill-advised opioid usage reaching alarming levels, a parliamentary bill was put forward which classified opium and its derivatives as poisons. This was intended to severely restrict the sale of such compounds, but it failed to pass through parliament, after being subject to intensive lobbying by trading chemists. It was also widely criticised as an impractical solution from an overall perspective. A much-diluted version of the original proposed bill was finally implemented as the Pharmacy Act 1868 (31 & 32 Vict. c. 121) which limited the sale of opium derivatives to registered chemists and legally qualified apothecaries. It explicitly excused patent medicines (and thus Godfrey's Cordial) from its purview.

Usage of Godfrey's Cordial gradually declined post-1890 as several court rulings held that the act applied equally to patent medicines and the British Medical Association subsequently published lists of safe home remedies, in a bid to increase public health awareness, which mentioned calomel and sugar-based derivatives as substitute sedative agents. Finally, the Pharmacy Act 1908, which classified it as a Schedule-I poison, followed by the Dangerous Drugs Act 1920 (10 & 11 Geo. 5. c. 46) which mandated a medical prescription, heavily restricted the availability and usage of any such opioid-based drug.
