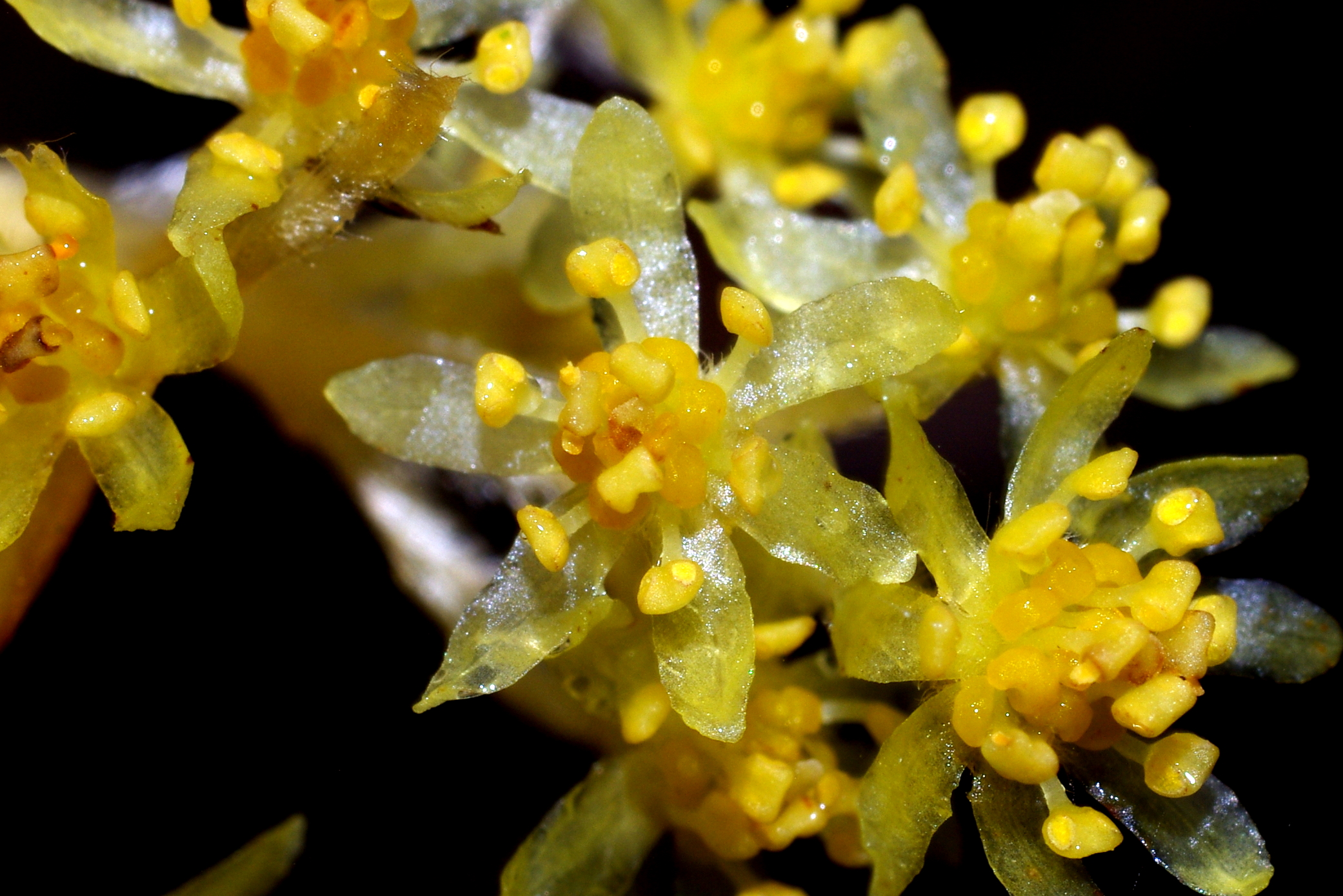

Conservation status
- Near Threatened (IUCN 3.1)

Scientific classification
- Kingdom: Plantae
- Clade: Tracheophytes
- Clade: Angiosperms
- Clade: Magnoliids
- Order: Laurales
- Family: Lauraceae
- Genus: Sassafras
- Species: S. randaiense

Binomial name
- Sassafras randaiense (Hayata) Rehder

Synonyms
- Lindera randaiensis Hayata; Yushunia randaiensis (Hayata) Kamik.

= Sassafras randaiense =

Species of tree

Sassafras randaiense is a species of deciduous tree in the family Lauraceae belonging to the genus Sassafras. It is a relict species endemic to Taiwan. It is threatened by habitat loss.

== Classification ==
Sassafras randaiense is treated by some botanists in a distinct genus as Yushunia randaiensis (Hayata) Kamikoti, though this is not supported by recent genetic evidence, which shows Sassafras to be monophyletic.

== Description ==
Sassafras randaiense is a medium-sized deciduous tree. The leaves are alternate, rhomboid-ovate, 10–15 cm long and 5–6 cm broad, and are glabrous above and glaucous beneath. The leaf shape is variable, with most leaves simple (entire) without lobes, but 2 to 3-lobed leaves can be found on some trees, a feature it shares with the North American species S. albidum and †S. hesperia. The leaves of S. randaiense have an acute apex, and the leaf base is acute or obtuse. The flowers are hermaphroditic and subterminal, in panicles that are 3 cm long. The fruits are globose, 6–7 mm across, and are attached on a thickened pedicel 2.5–3 cm long. Flowering occurs usually in February with fruit maturing in October. S. randaiense is found in broad-leaved forests from 900 to 2,400 m throughout the island of Taiwan.

== Distinguishing characteristics from Sassafras albidum ==
Along with Sassafras tzumu, Sassafras randaiense is distinguished from the North American Sassafras albidum and extinct Sassafras hesperia by some important characteristics, including that they may have both male flowers and female flowers on the same tree, while the North American species are dioecious (individual plants bear only male or only female flowers). Molecular data also shows some differences between the Chinese and North American species.
