= Another Day =

Another Day may refer to:

== Albums ==
- Another Day (Steve Ashley album)
- Another Day (The Hurt Process album)
- Another Day (Lene Marlin album)
- Another Day (Oscar Peterson album)
- Another Day (Racoon album)
- Another Day (Solas album)
- Another Day (Yoo Seung-jun album)

== Songs ==
- "Another Day" (Dream Theater song)
- "Another Day" (Lemar song)
- "Another Day" (Modestep and Popeska song)
- "Another Day" (Paul McCartney song)
- "Another Day" (Roy Harper song)
- "Another Day" (U2 song)
- "Another Day" (Whigfield song)
- "(I Can't Make It) Another Day", by Michael Jackson and Lenny Kravitz
- "Another Day", by Air from Talkie Walkie
- "Another Day", by Amy Diamond from This Is Me Now
- "Another Day", by Bryan Adams from Into the Fire
- "Another Day", by Buckshot LeFonque from Music Evolution
- "Another Day", by The Cure from Three Imaginary Boys
- "Another Day", by Cut_ from Millionairhead
- "Another Day", by Galaxie 500 from On Fire
- "Another Day", by James Taylor from Hourglass
- "Another Day", by Jamie Lidell from Jim
- "Another Day", by Lodestar
- "Another Day", by Nine Days from the soundtrack to the film Summer Catch
- "Another Day", by Paramore, an unreleased demo
- "Another Day", by Pomplamoose from their EP 3 New Songs Woot!
- "Another Day", by The Rutles from The Rutles
- "Another Day", by Screaming Jets from Heart of the Matter
- "Another Day", by Sophie Ellis-Bextor from Shoot from the Hip
- "Another Day", by The Spencer Davis Group from Living in a Back Street
- "Another Day", by Status Quo from Heavy Traffic
- "Another Day", by Sting, the B-side to "If You Love Somebody Set Them Free"
- "Another Day", by Stray Kids from Go Live
- "Another Day", by Strawberry Switchblade from Strawberry Switchblade
- "Another Day", by Telepopmusik from Angel Milk
- "Another Day", by Xentrix from Kin
- "Another Day (That Time Forgot)", a song by Neil Diamond and Natalie Maines from Diamond's album Home Before Dark

== Film and television ==
- Another Day (2001 film)
- Another Day (2026 film)
- Another Day (short film)
- Another Day (TV series), a 1978 American sitcom

== Other uses ==
- Another Day (novel), by David Levithan
- "Another Day", a scene from the musical Rent

== See also ==
- Another Day, Another Life, an album by Bomb Factory
- Another Day/Another Dollar, an EP by Gang of Four
- Die Another Day, a 2002 film in the James Bond series
- Another Day in Paradise (disambiguation)
- Just Another Day (disambiguation)
