= Just for One Day =

Just for One Day may refer to:

- "Just for One Day (Heroes)", a track by electronic music artist David Guetta
- "Just for One Day", a track by pop group the Grace from their 2007 album Graceful 4
- Just for One Day (film), an Ethiopian documentary picture
- Just for One Day - Run for Free College, a part of the broader Kahit Isang Araw Lang Unity Run series
- Just for One Day: Adventures in Britpop, a book by musician and writer Louise Wener
- Just for One Day (musical), a jukebox musical by John O'Farrell, based on the story of Live Aid
- "Heroes" (David Bowie song), a 1977 song

== See also ==
- Just One Day (disambiguation)
