= Radichetta =

'Radichetta'
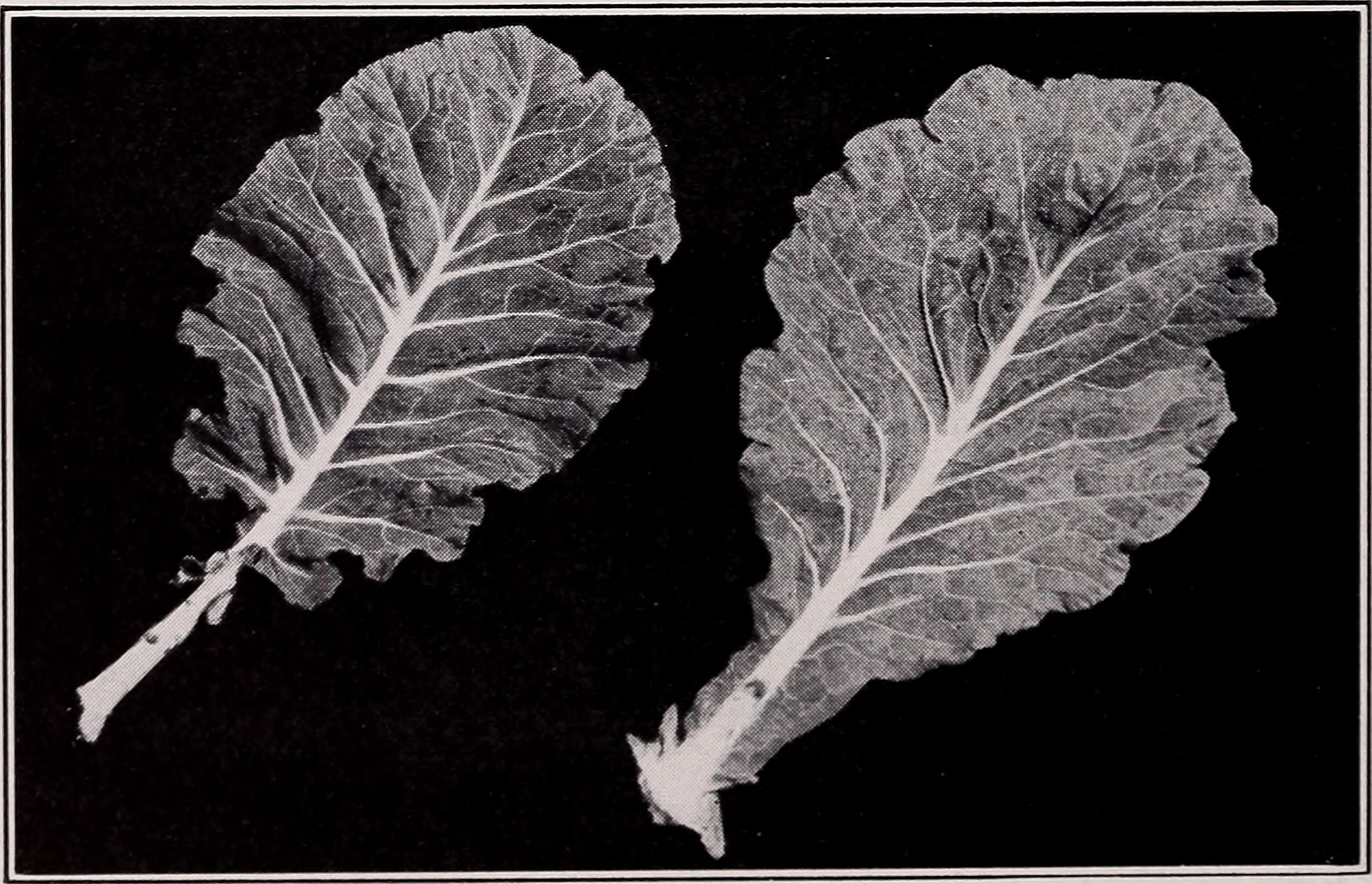
- Image from A descriptive catalogue of vegetables (1940)
- Species: Cichorium intybus var. foliosum
- Origin: Italy

Radichetta (also known as 'Catalogna Lettuce') is a type of chicory, similar to radicchio. It can be eaten raw as a salad green (similar to a lettuce), or in sandwiches, and can also be used as a garnish. It has a soft texture and mildly bitter flavor.

It can be eaten fresh or cooked, in various Italian dishes. It can be cooked like a vegetable, lightly sauteed in olive oil.

It grows fast from seed, either inside (before being planted outside) or outdoors in rows, 8–12 inches apart. It is recommended to sow seeds between February and the end of October. The lettuce-like plants can grow up to 1 foot tall.

It is cold tolerant, and is slow to bolt, in spring. The young leaves can be harvested or the whole head later in the summer.
