= Ricoré =

Product of Nestlé

Ricoré is a product of Nestlé created in 1953. It is an instant coffee product containing chicory, composed of 33.2% instant coffee and 63% chicory and magnesium sulfate. The brand is primarily found in France, and to a lesser degree in Belgium, Spain, Portugal and in Poland. Most consume Ricoré mixed with milk, but some mix it with water, and others still mix it with both milk and water.

== Advertisements ==
Ricoré is known in France for its advertising. One such advertisement campaign ran from 1981 to ca. 2005 and contained a jingle written by André Georget called "L'ami du petit-déjeuner, l'ami Ricoré" ("breakfast's friend, Ricoré"). In these commercials, different family situations at the breakfast table were depicted, with each situation being resolved by Ricoré. In September 2006, "Devenez du matin" ("become a morning person") replaced "l'ami Ricoré" ("Friend Ricoré") as the brand's slogan.

== In South Africa ==
In South Africa the product is known as Ricoffy. It was developed in 1952 as Ricory and by the early 1970s was renamed. The French Huguenots had originally introduced chicory-based coffee to South Africa and the product became entrenched in the local coffee culture. See Huguenots in South Africa.
