= A Heartbeat Behind =

Studio album by The Hurt Process
- Released: May 31, 2005
- Label: Victory
- Producer: John Mitchell

The Hurt Process chronology
Drive By Monologue (2003)	A Heartbeat Behind (2005)

A Heartbeat Behind is the second full-length album by the now defunct British post-hardcore band The Hurt Process. It was released on Golf Records on 31 May 2005 and features ten original tracks. The band released only one single from the album, "My Scandinavian Ride", the video for which garnered some airplay in the UK on channels such as Scuzz TV and Kerrang! TV.

== Track listing ==
1. Anchor (3:40)
2. You Don't Get Gold For Second Place (3:39)
3. A Heartbeat Behind (4:14)
4. A Mind with Two Faces (4:46)
5. My Scandinavian Ride (3:48)
6. Boogie Nights In Michigan (3:40)
7. Take to You (4:18)
8. The Night Before The Morning After (3:34)
9. Delicious 53 (3:34)
10. Reading into It (5:47).
