= The Hurt Process =

British band

- Origin: Royal Tunbridge Wells, Kent, England
- Genres: Post-Hardcore, metalcore

The Hurt Process was a British-based hardcore/metalcore band from Royal Tunbridge Wells, England. Their second album, A Heartbeat Behind, was released on 31 May 2005. The band split up in 2005. They reunited in August 2019.

== Biography ==
In 2002, The Hurt Process released the Another Day EP on Loudspeaker, to rave reviews from Big Cheese, Kerrang!, Metal Hammer, and Rocksound who said: "This EP rocks harder than a Whitesnake roadie at a Venom concert!, You need The Hurt Process. Amazing. Destined to be on the UKs hottest new bands".

The Hurt Process built a substantial fan base with touring and concerts, sharing the stage with Taking Back Sunday, Atreyu and Silverstein. In 2003, Inherited Industries released the Last Goodbye EP.

The band's debut album, Drive By Monologue, was also received with critical praise. Mike Davies of BBC Radio said, "Who says that Americans do it better? The Hurt Process will be exploding out of the underground with Drive By Monologue. This is how melodic hardcore should be done". Victory Records released the album in North America, prompting praise from Revolver, who said, "Drive By Monologue seamlessly shifts gears from grinding hardcore to introspective emo without ever losing its keen sense of direction. Stick along for the ride".

The band played several weeks on the Warped Tour 2004, expanding their fan base stateside. The band split up in 2006.

== Press ==
"This band rocks harder than a Whitesnake roadie at a venom concert" – Big Cheese

"The aural equivalent of being punched in the face only for your attacker to offer to kiss the bruising better" – Kerrang!

"This was another winning set from the Hurt Process lads, who it must be said are going from strength to strength. They were the act of the night and they provoked the best, if somewhat chaotic, reaction from the exuberant crowd." – BBC review of a live show.

== Band members ==
- Daniel Lawrence: Vocals
- Tom Valentine-Diamond: Guitar, Vocals
- Casp Howes: Guitar
- Duncan McGilvary: Bass
- Darren Toms: Drums

== Previous members ==
- Matt Lucas: Bass
- Ivan Ferreira: Vocals
- Brendan McNally: Guitar
- Adam Yeoman: Drums
- Jordan Schulze: Guitar
- Alun Burnet-Smith: Guitar
- Mark Andrews: Vocals

== Discography ==
=== Albums ===
- Drive By Monologue (2003)
- A Heartbeat Behind (2005)

=== Demos and EPs ===
- Another Day (2002 EP)
- Last Goodbye (2003 EP)
