= Puntarelle =

Variant of chicory

'Puntarelle'
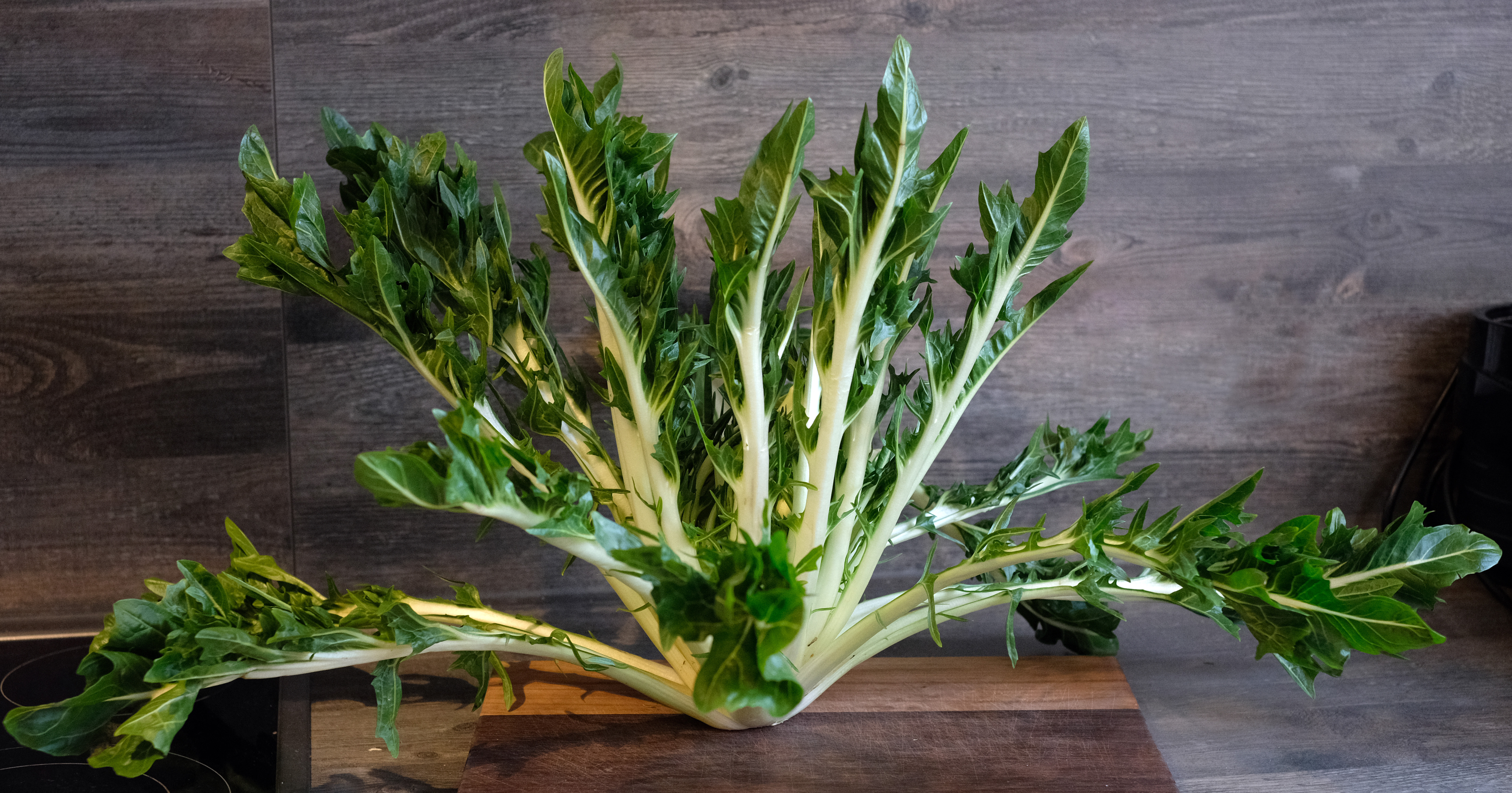
- Puntarelle sold in the market of Turin, Italy
- Species: Cichorium intybus var. foliosum
- Origin: Italy

Puntarelle or cicoria di catalogna or cicoria asparago is a variant of chicory. The heads are characterized by an elongated shape (about 40–50 cm), light green stems and dandelion shaped leaves. 'Puntarelle' shoots have a pleasantly bitter taste.

== Applications ==
'Puntarelle' are picked when they are young and tender and may be eaten raw or cooked. Often used as a traditional ingredient in the Roman salad called by the same name, they are prepared with the leaves stripped and the shoots soaked in cold water until they curl. The salad is served with a dressing prepared of anchovy, garlic, vinegar, and salt, pounded and emulsified with olive oil.

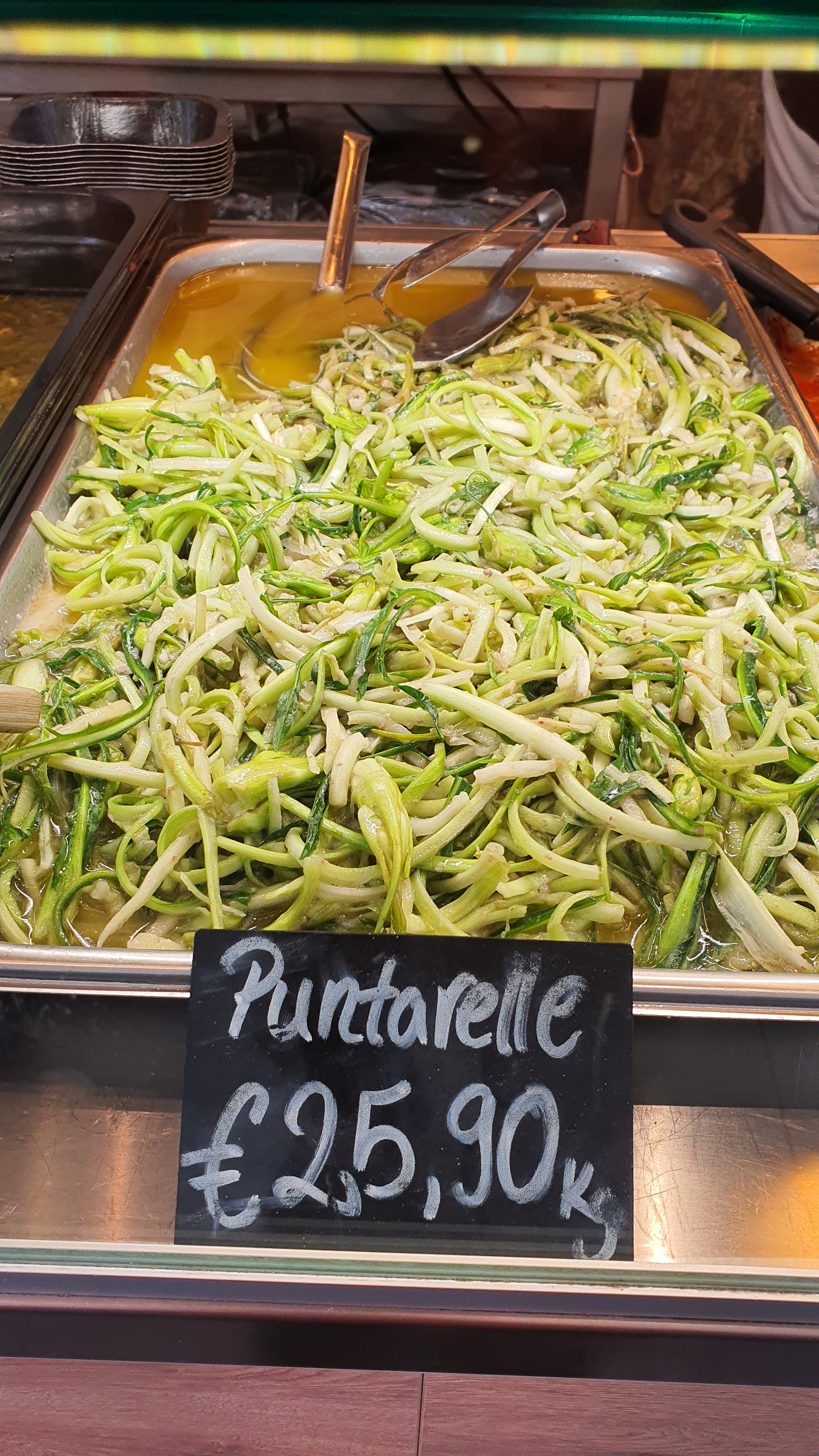
After treatment for sale on a market in Rome.

There are two types of puntarelle. The puntarelle di Gaeta from Lazio has long shoots that curl once they are trimmed. While the Puntarelle di Galatina from Apulia have shorter shoots and will not curl.
