= Belgian endive =

Lettuce-like vegetable or salad green

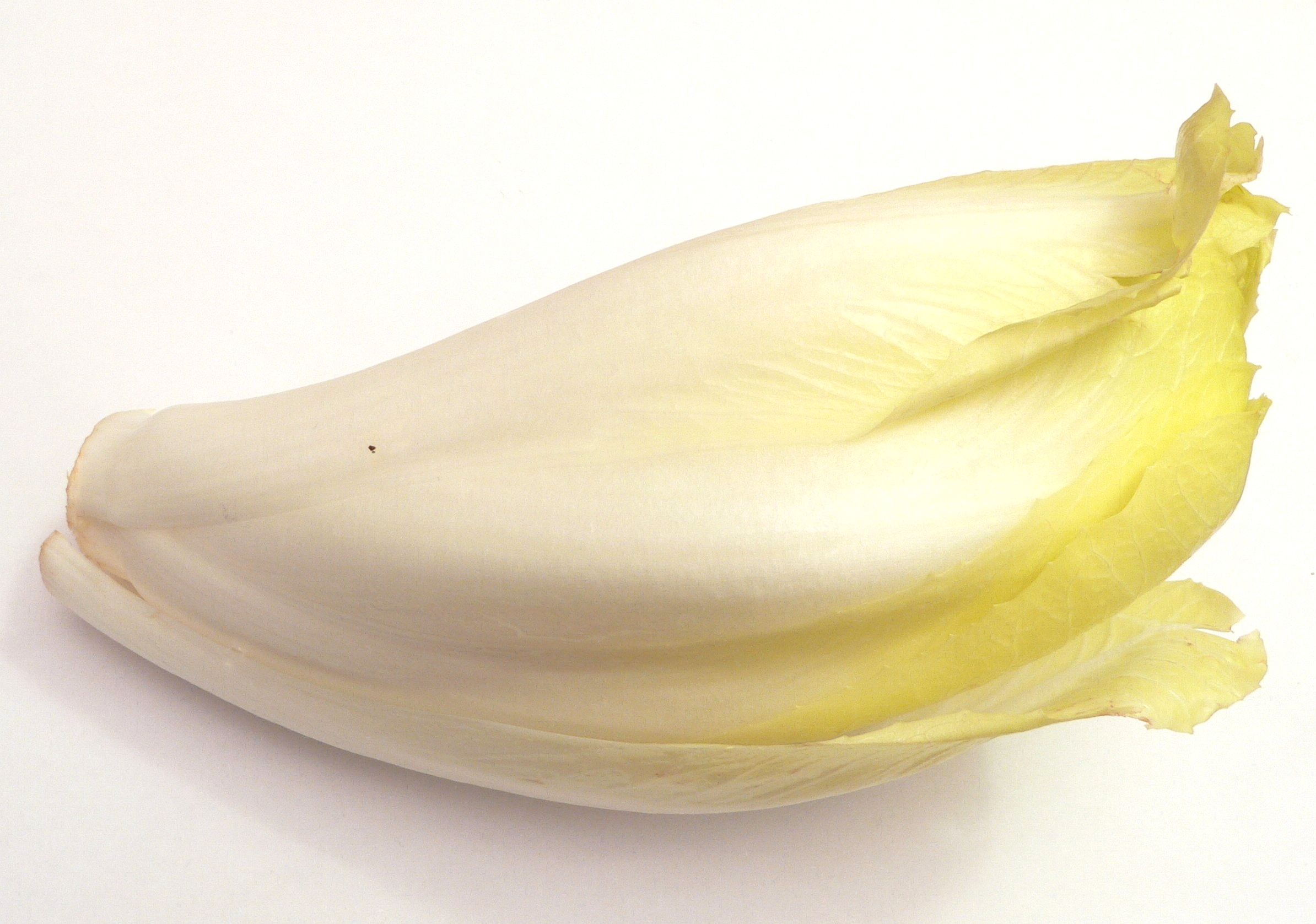

Belgian endive (Cichorium intybus), also known as witloof ("white leaf") chicory or chicon, is a lettuce-like vegetable or salad green. Belgian endive was developed in Belgium in the 1850s and is nicknamed "white gold" in that country. In 2021 Brussels added it to the region's Inventory of Intangible Cultural Heritage.

== Description and culinary use ==
It has a small compact elongated head of cream-colored leaves. The tender leaves are slightly bitter; the whiter the leaf, the less bitter the taste. The smooth, creamy white leaves may be served cooked or raw. The highest quality Belgian endives have a small, soft heart, which are typically found in the traditionally-grown vegetables known as grondwitloof.

When cooked, the bitterness mellows to a nutty flavor. The vegetable can be cooked whole, cut up, or separated into leaves. It can be stuffed, baked, braised, roasted, or cooked in a sauce.

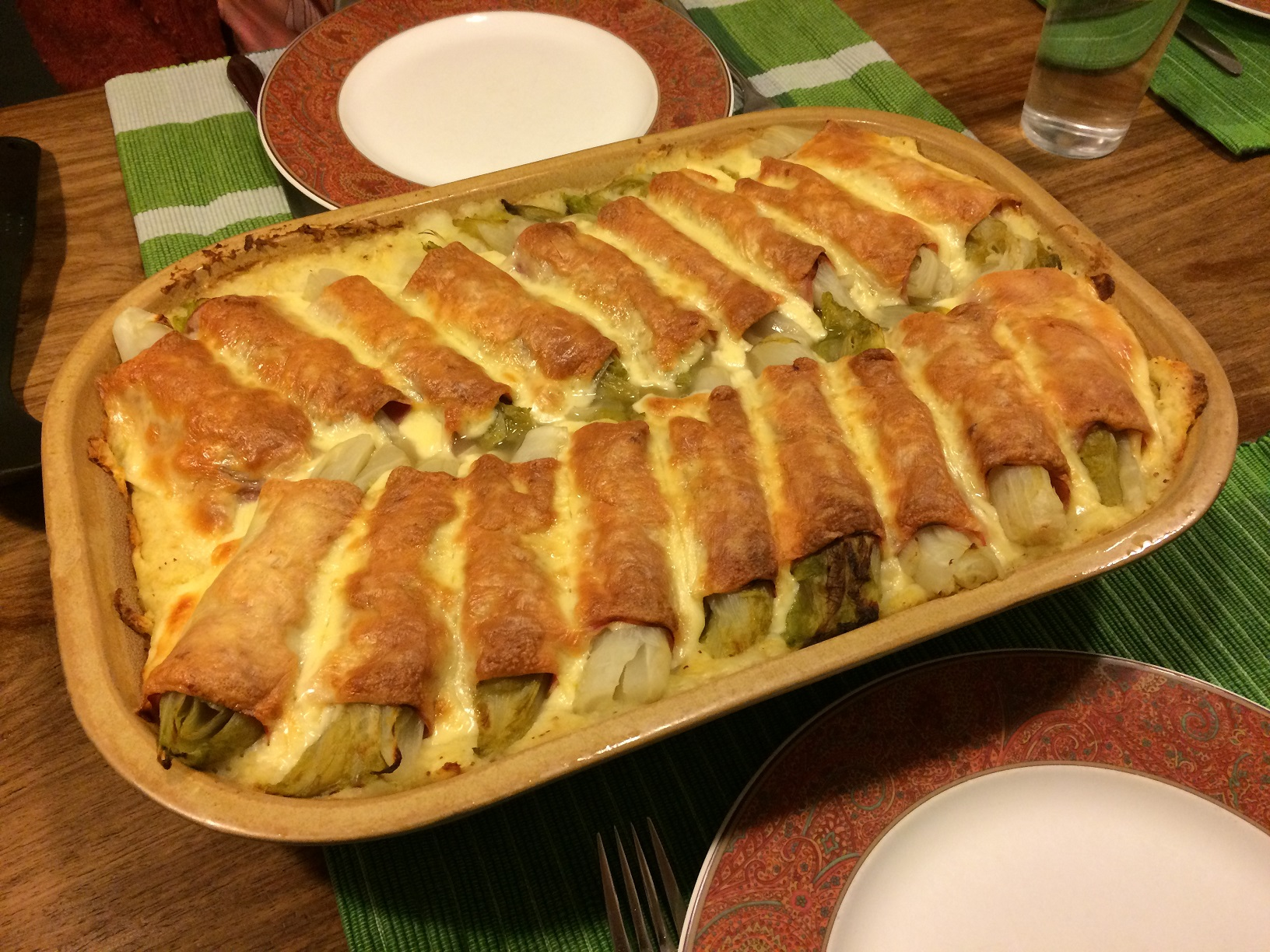
Endive au jambon

In the US, the Belgian endive is typically served raw in salads or used to create appetizer dishes of stuffed individual leaves and is considered a gourmet produce item. In Europe, it is sometimes served as a roasted or baked whole vegetable in a sauce, such as a gratin, and is considered an important winter vegetable. A well-known cooked dish is endive au jambon, endive wrapped in ham and baked in mornay sauce.

The roots of the wild plant are sometimes roasted, ground, and brewed into a beverage called chicory that is sometimes used as a substitute for or an extender to coffee.

== Growing ==
The plant is a biennial which had been primarily grown for the value of its first-season root in producing the beverage chicory. It had not been exploited for its second season until the development of the second-year sprout as a vegetable in Belgium.

According to one legend, the technique for growing blanched endives was accidentally discovered in the mid-1800s when a chicory farmer named Jan Lammers returned from military duty and discovered the roots he had stored had sprouted and the sprouts were good to eat. Another version of the story is that a botanist named François (or perhaps Frans) Breziers, a chief gardener at the Brussels Botanical Garden, developed the Belgian endive in an equally happy accident. In Belgium the vegetable is called witloof or chicon and is nicknamed "white gold".

As traditionally grown, they are available from December to April in temperate climates, making them unusual. Commercially grown Belgian endive are available year-around.

The plant has a taproot, so it must be started where it will be grown. For its first year, it is field-grown. It is seeded in the spring in northern temperate climates.

In commercial growing, at the end of the first growing season, the plant is harvested, the leaves are removed, and the root is stored in cold conditions, mimicking an overwintering. The root is then allowed to re-sprout indoors in the absence of sunlight, which prevents the leaves from turning green and opening up. This hydroponics method was developed in the 1970s and produces an endive called hydrowitloof.

In traditional cultivation, the leaves are cut off at the end of the first growing season and the roots are left in the ground covered with layers of straw topped with sheets of metal or thick fabric to block the sunlight to overwinter. The traditional method produces an endive called grondwitloof (soil Belgian endive) which are typically higher quality.

Belgian endive from farm to plate
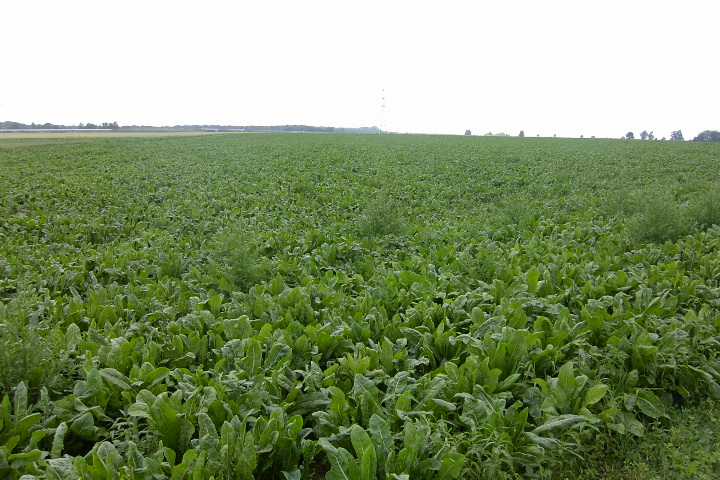
A field of first-season Belgian endive

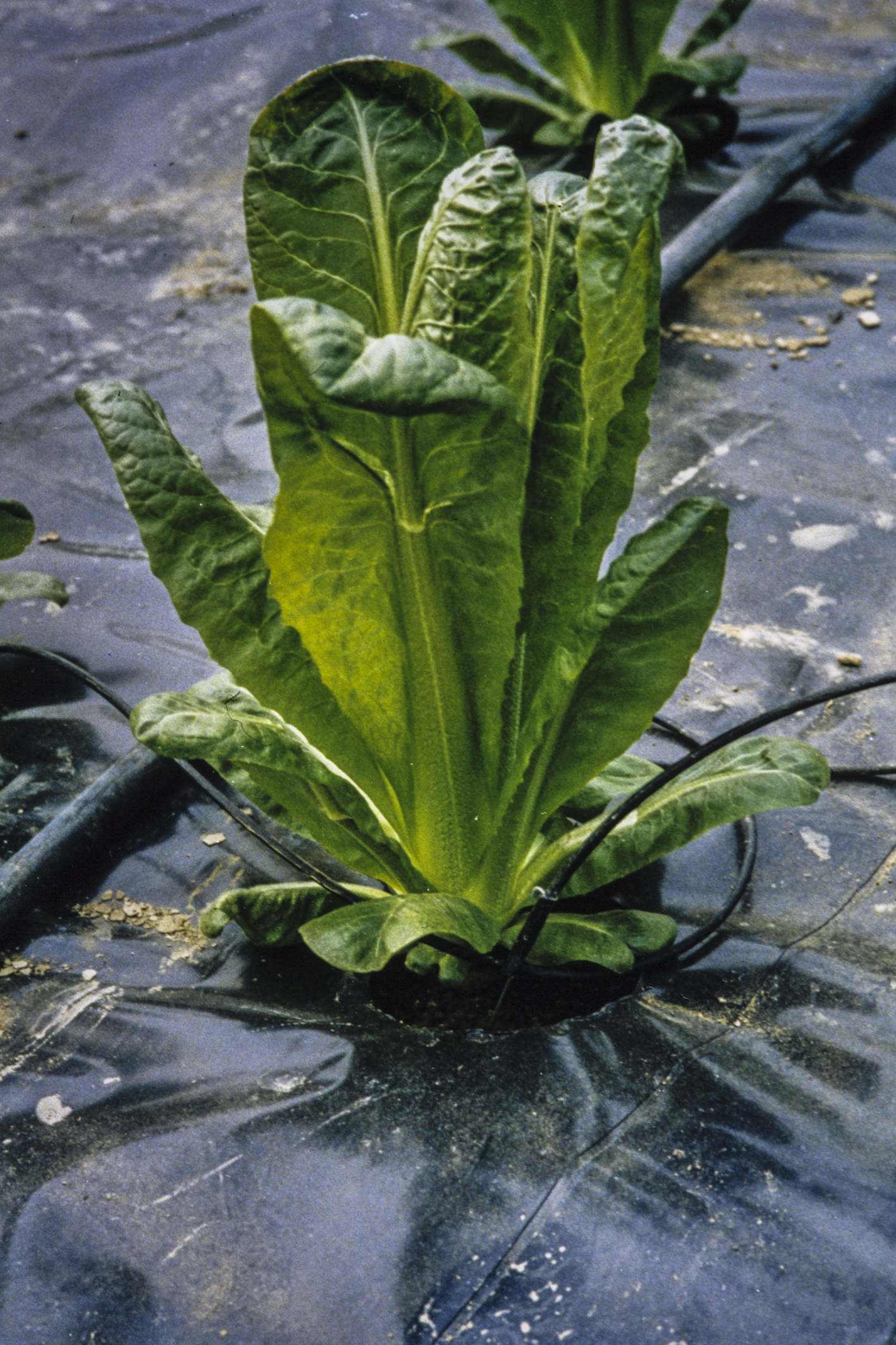
A first-season plant

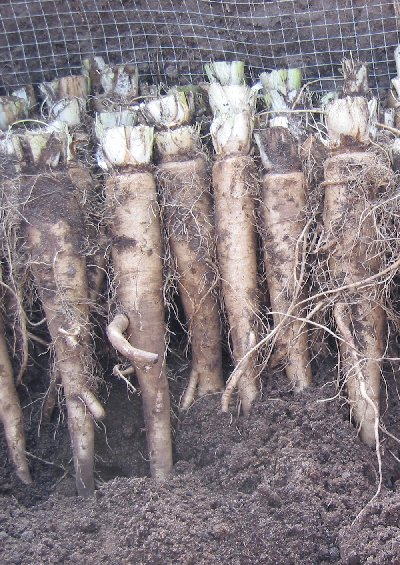
Root with leaves removed, ready to be packed into a growing container

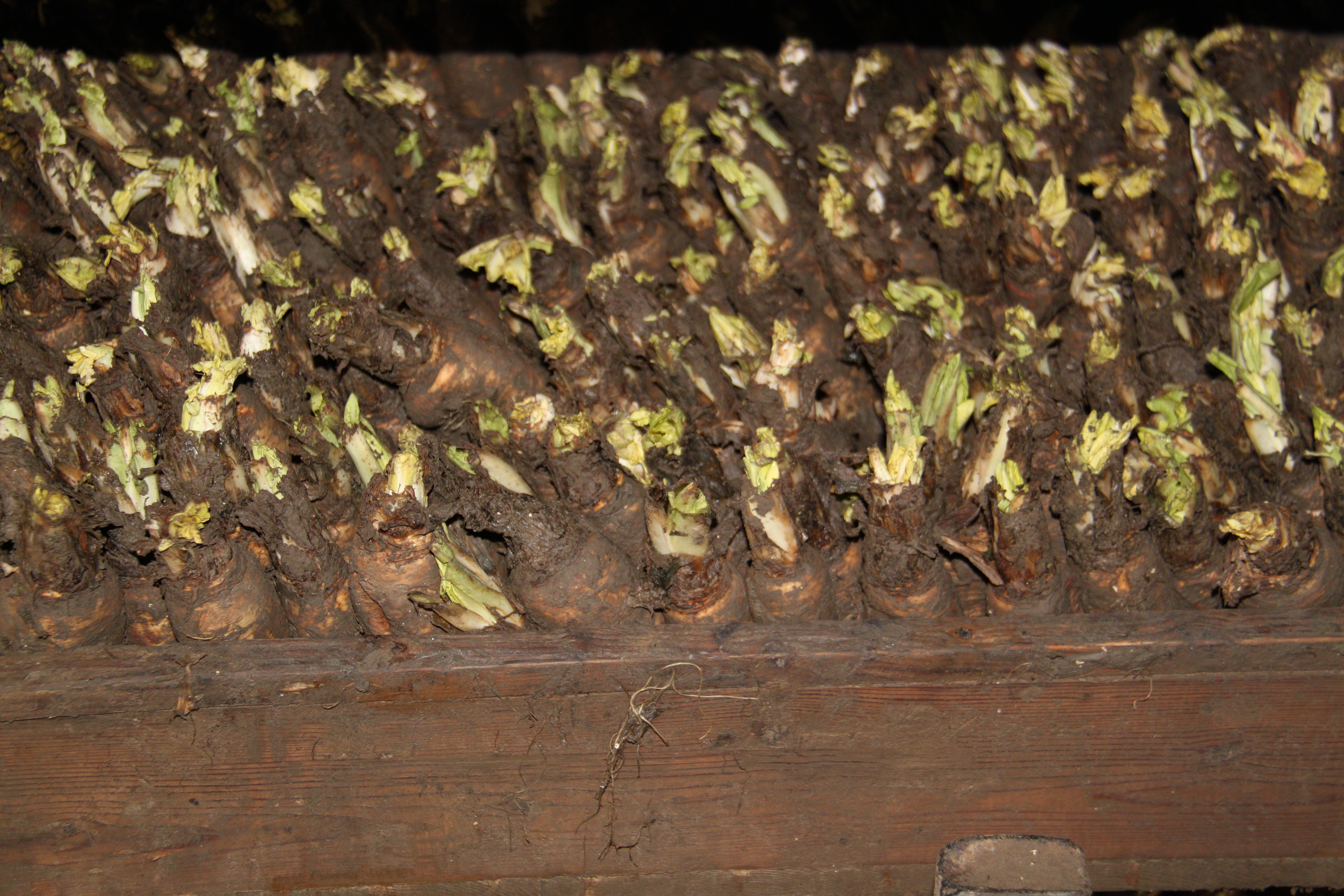
Roots packed into growing container for cold storage, then sprouting

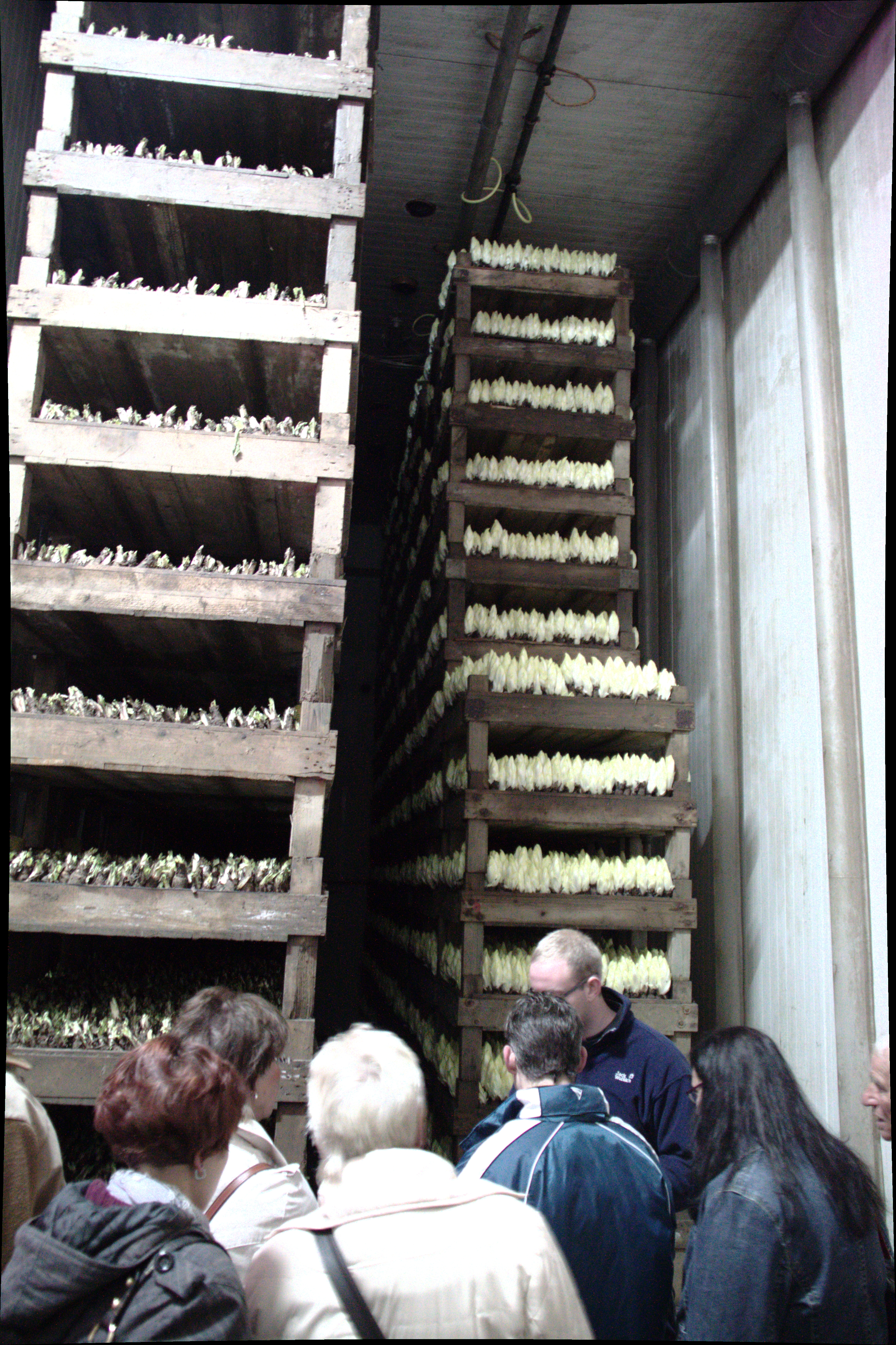
Second-year Belgian endive in a growing facility

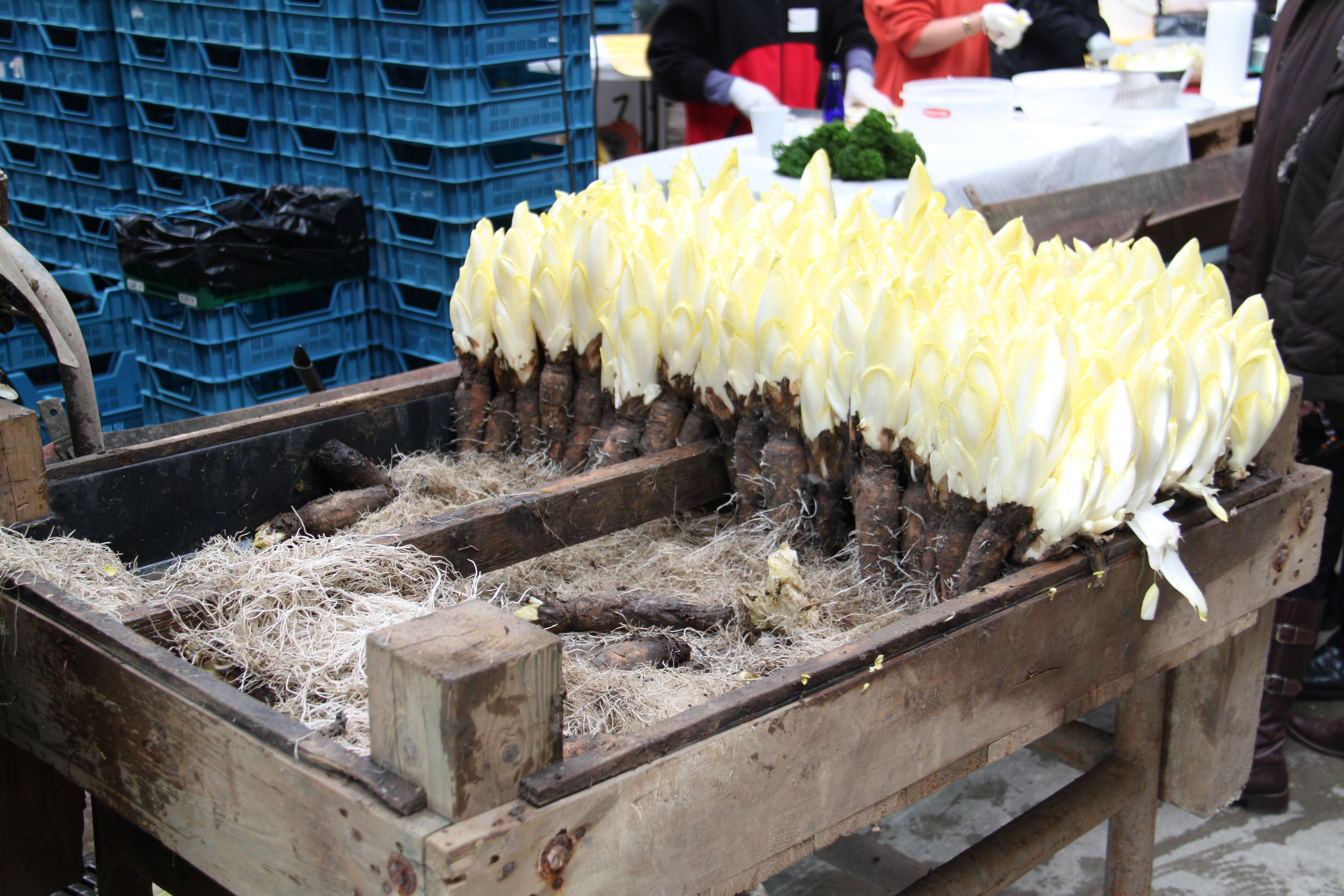
Sprouted Belgian endive

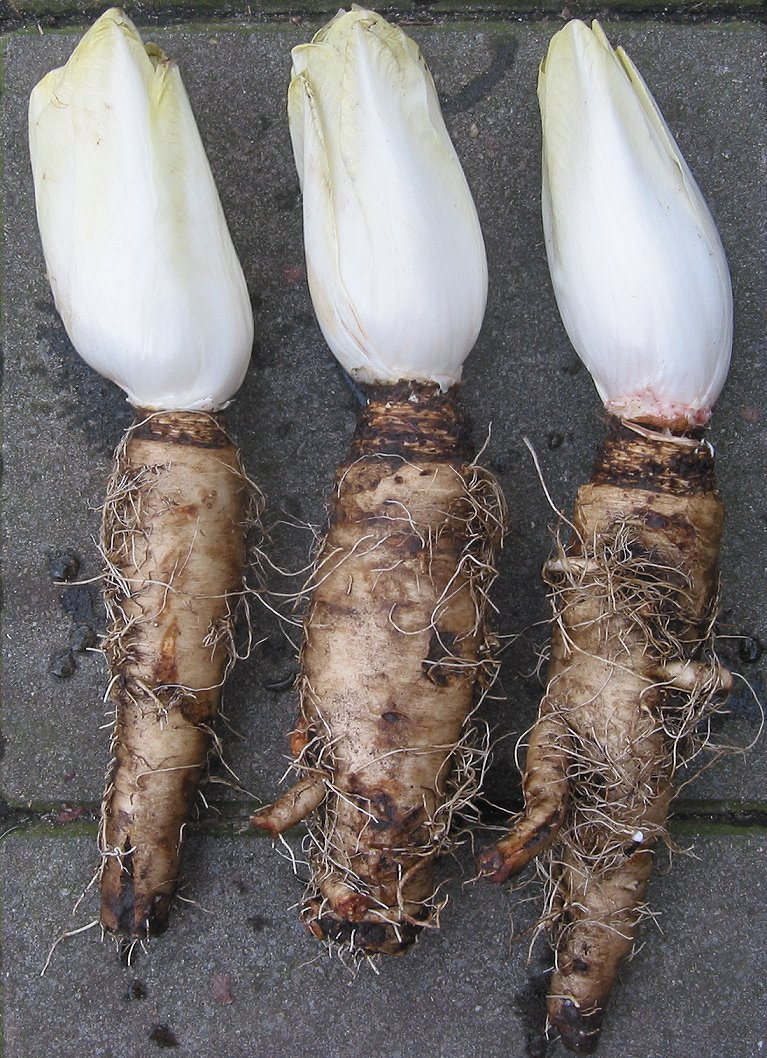
Belgian endive, still with root

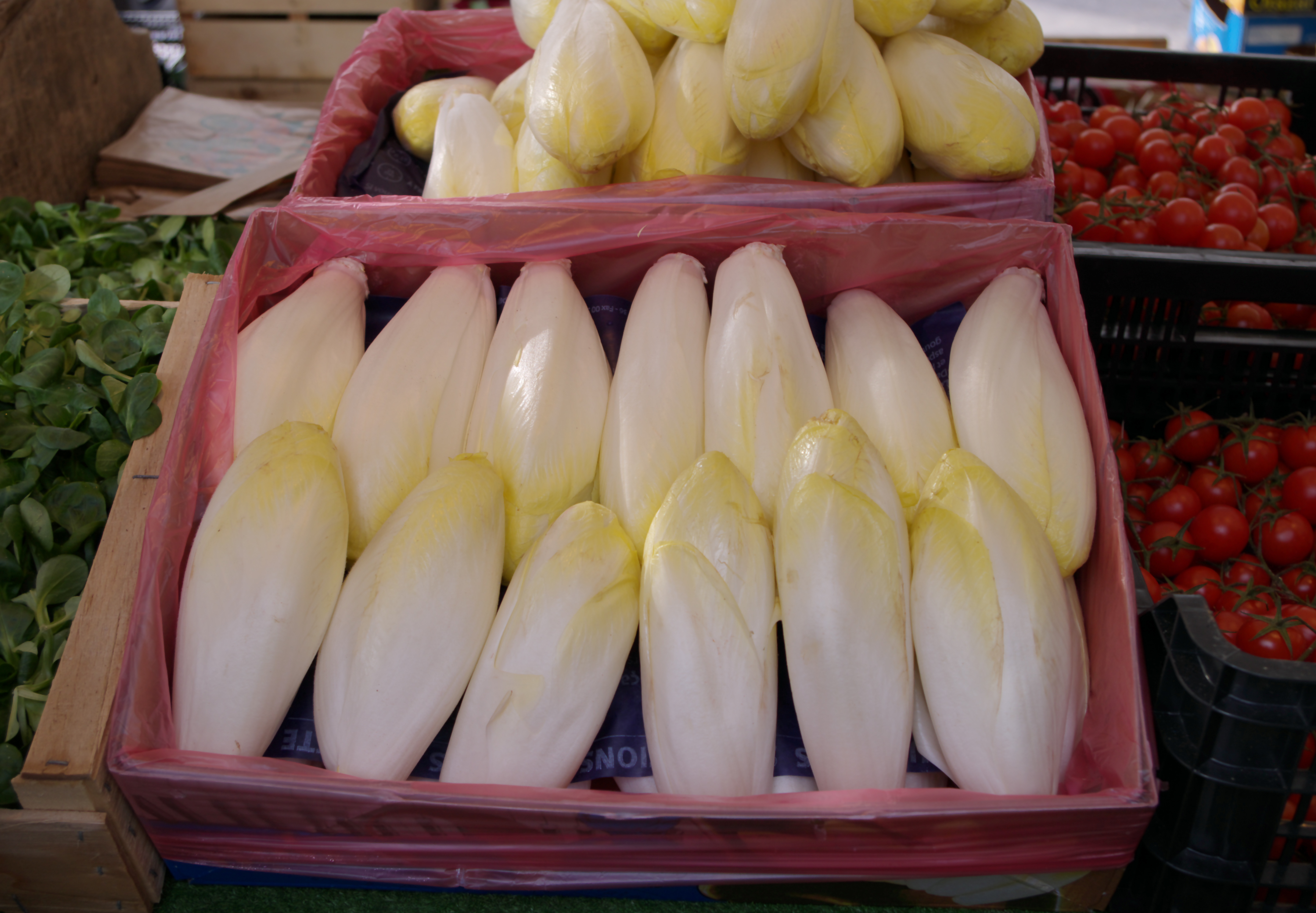
Belgian endive displayed at a market

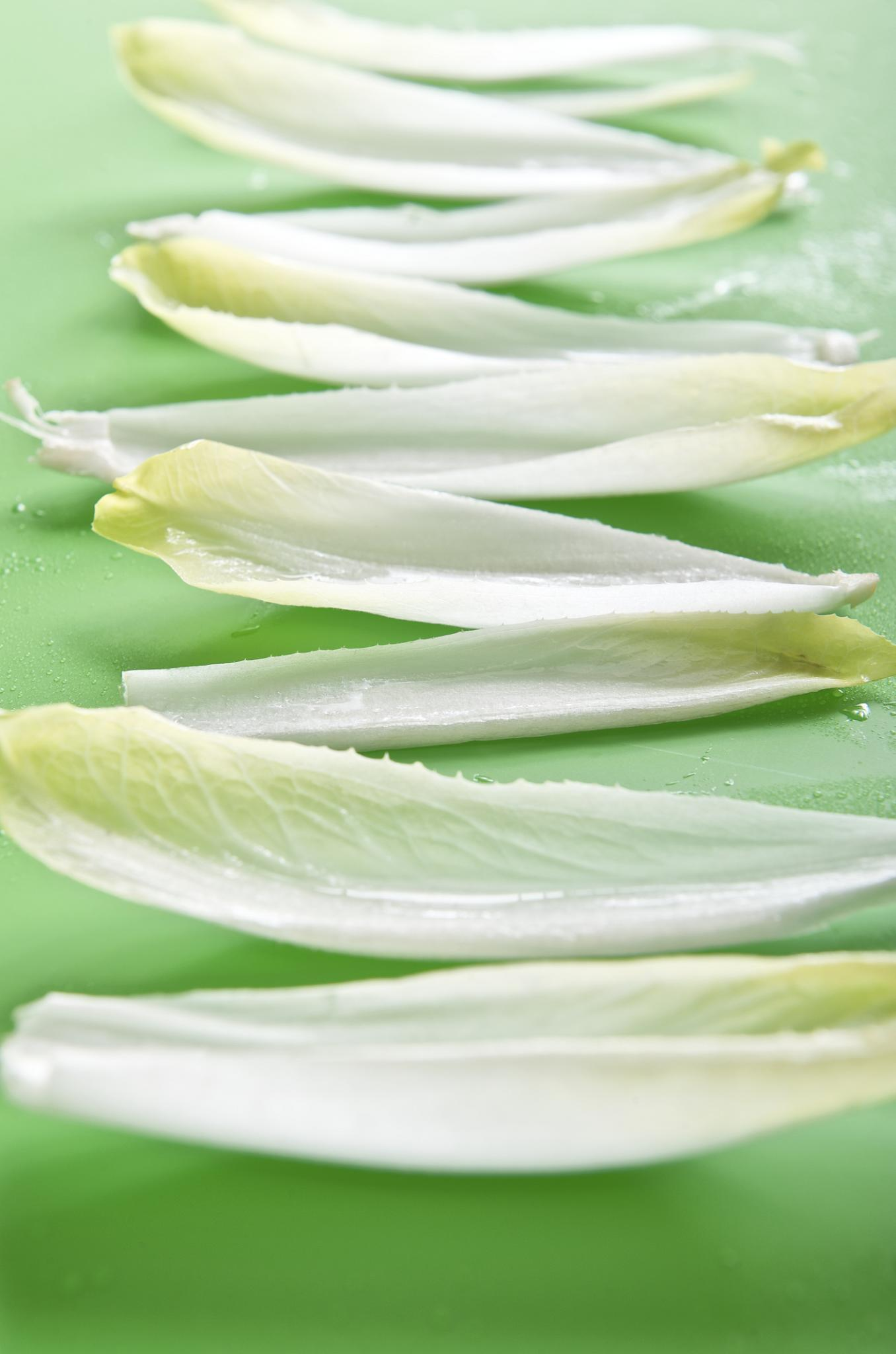
Belgian endive leaves

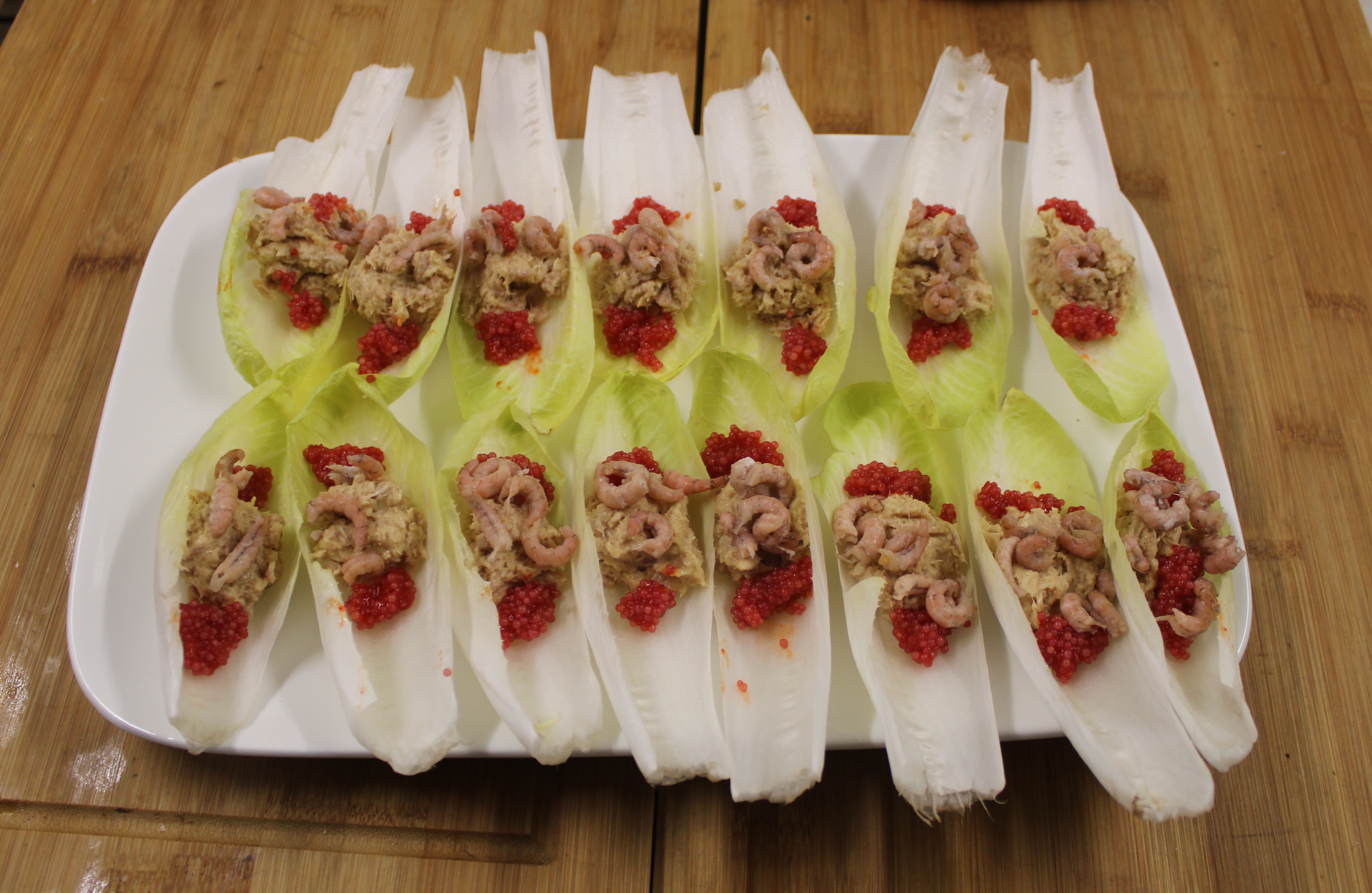
Belgian endive leaves stuffed with shrimp and served as an appetizer

== Industry ==
Belgium's Praktijkpunt Landbouw Vlaams-Brabant (Practical Centre for Agriculture in Flemish Brabant), formerly the Nationale Proeftuin Voor Witloof (National Testing Garden for Belgian Endive), is in Herent.

In the 1970s, the endive was the most-grown vegetable in Belgium and accounted for a quarter of vegetables grown in the country. Producers of hydrowitloof, able to produce year around, pushed out producers of grondwitloof, but eventually were themselves pushed out by cheaper producers in other countries. By the 2010, commercial producers of both types of Belgian endive were leaving the industry. Brussels Grondwitloof was awarded a European Protected Geographical Indication (PGI) designation.

As of 2021, production of the vegetable in Belgium is "mostly by amateurs" rather than as a commercial crop; the availability of land and the costs of input, including electricity to create the cold storage necessary for production, had harmed the domestic industry.

== See also ==
- Endive
- Radicchio
