= Blanching (horticulture) =

Growing technique to change the flavor and texture of vegetables

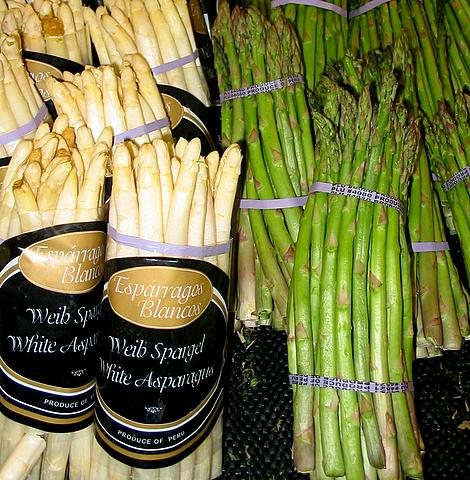
White and green asparagus.

Blanching is a technique used in vegetable growing. Young shoots of a plant are covered to exclude light to prevent photosynthesis and the production of chlorophyll, and thus remain pale in color. Different methods used include covering with soil (hilling or earthing up) or with solid materials such as board or terracotta pots, or growing the crop indoors in darkened conditions. Blanched vegetables generally tend to have a more delicate flavor and texture compared to those that are not blanched, but blanching can also cause the vegetables to be lower in vitamin A.

== Examples ==
Vegetables that are usually blanched include:

- Cauliflower
- Cardoon
- Celery
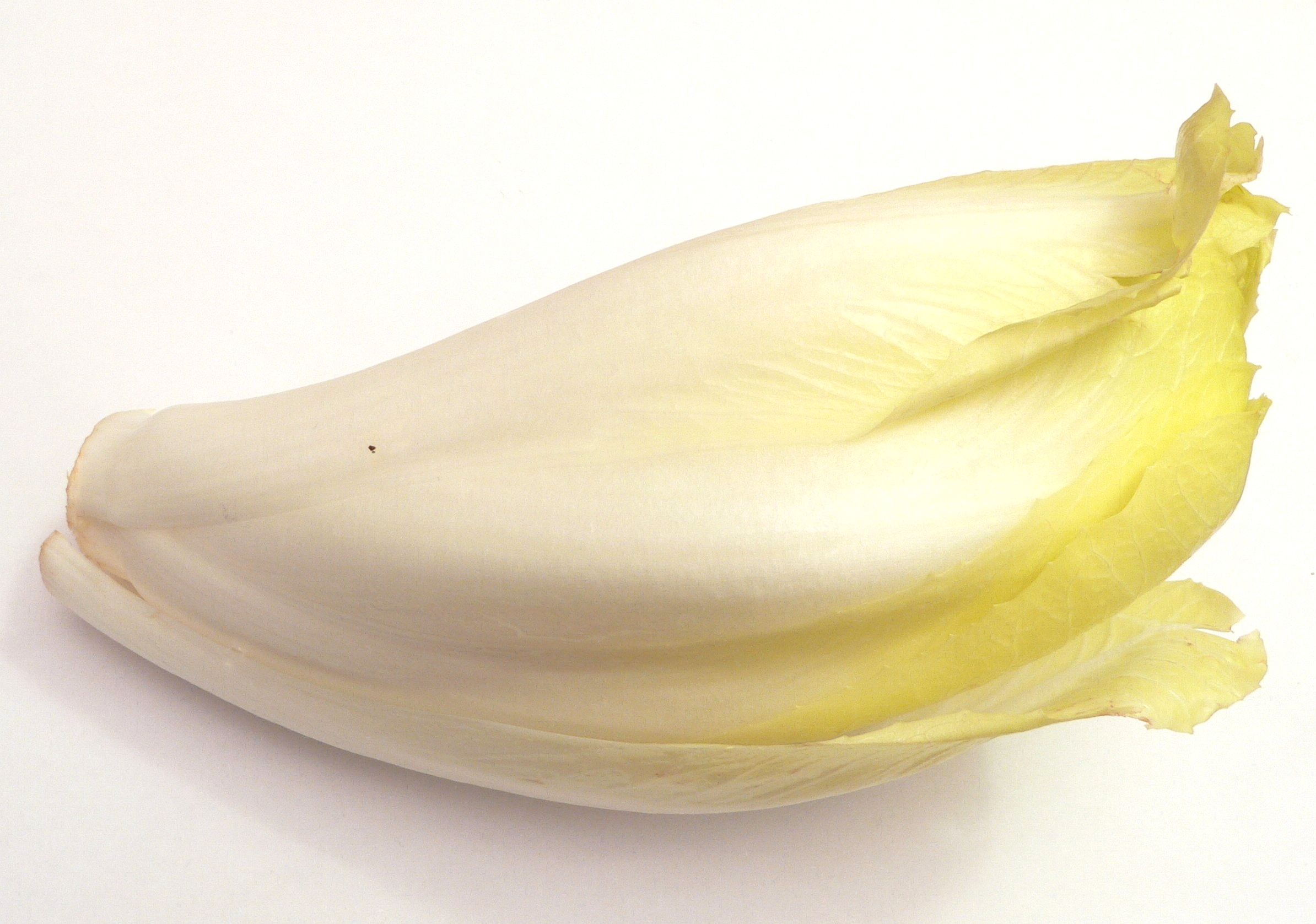
- Belgian endive
  Chicory (Chicorium intybus), or common chicory, in the United States also called 'endive' (the common name for Chicorium endivia). Many varieties do not need artificial blanching because the outer leaves sufficiently protect the inner ones from light, such as 'sugar loaf' types, or because both their natural colour and bitterness are appreciated, like radicchio of which the red colour depends on the duration of exposure. Cultivars that require blanching may need 'forcing' the growth by (controlled) exposure of the crown. This is the case for Belgian endive (though it is not a botanical endive, but a chicory), also referred to by its names in French, chicon, and Dutch, witlof.
- Good King Henry (Chenopodium bonus-henricus)
- Leek
- Potato
- Sea kale (Crambe maritima)

Vegetables that are sometimes blanched include:

- Alexanders
- Asparagus grows stems that can be consumed naturally green, while young. Blanching cultivars by hilling results in the stem remaining white.
- Cabbage
- Dandelion
- Endive
- Lettuce
- Lovage
- Rhubarb

== See also ==
- Etiolation – the botanical term for plants growing in insufficient light
