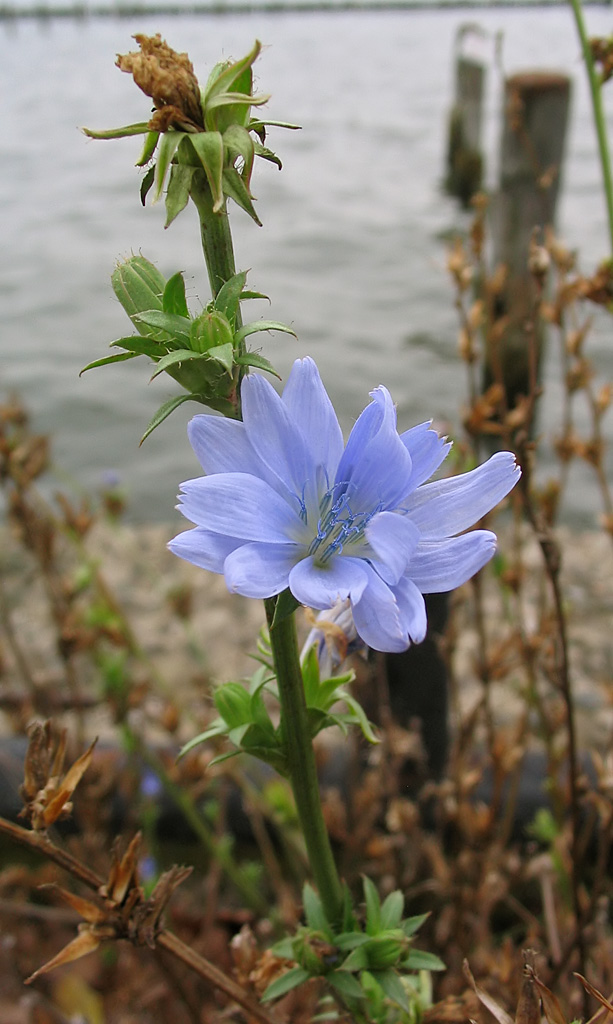
- Blue-flowered form

Scientific classification
- Kingdom: Plantae
- Clade: Tracheophytes
- Clade: Angiosperms
- Clade: Eudicots
- Clade: Asterids
- Order: Asterales
- Family: Asteraceae
- Genus: Cichorium
- Species: C. intybus

Binomial name
- Cichorium intybus L.

Synonyms
- Synonymy: Cichorium balearicum Porta; Cichorium byzantinum Clementi; Cichorium caeruleum Gilib.; Cichorium cicorea Dumort.; Cichorium commune Pall.; Cichorium cosnia Buch.-Ham.; Cichorium divaricatum Heldr. ex Nyman; Cichorium glabratum C.Presl; Cichorium glaucum Hoffmanns. & Link; Cichorium hirsutum Gren.; Cichorium illyricum borb.; Cichorium officinale Gueldenst. ex Ledeb.; Cichorium perenne Stokes; Cichorium rigidum Salisb.; Cichorium spinosum Salisb.; Cichorium sylvestre Garsault; Cichorium sylvestre (Tourn.) Lam.

= Chicory =

Common chicory

Flowering plant in the daisy family

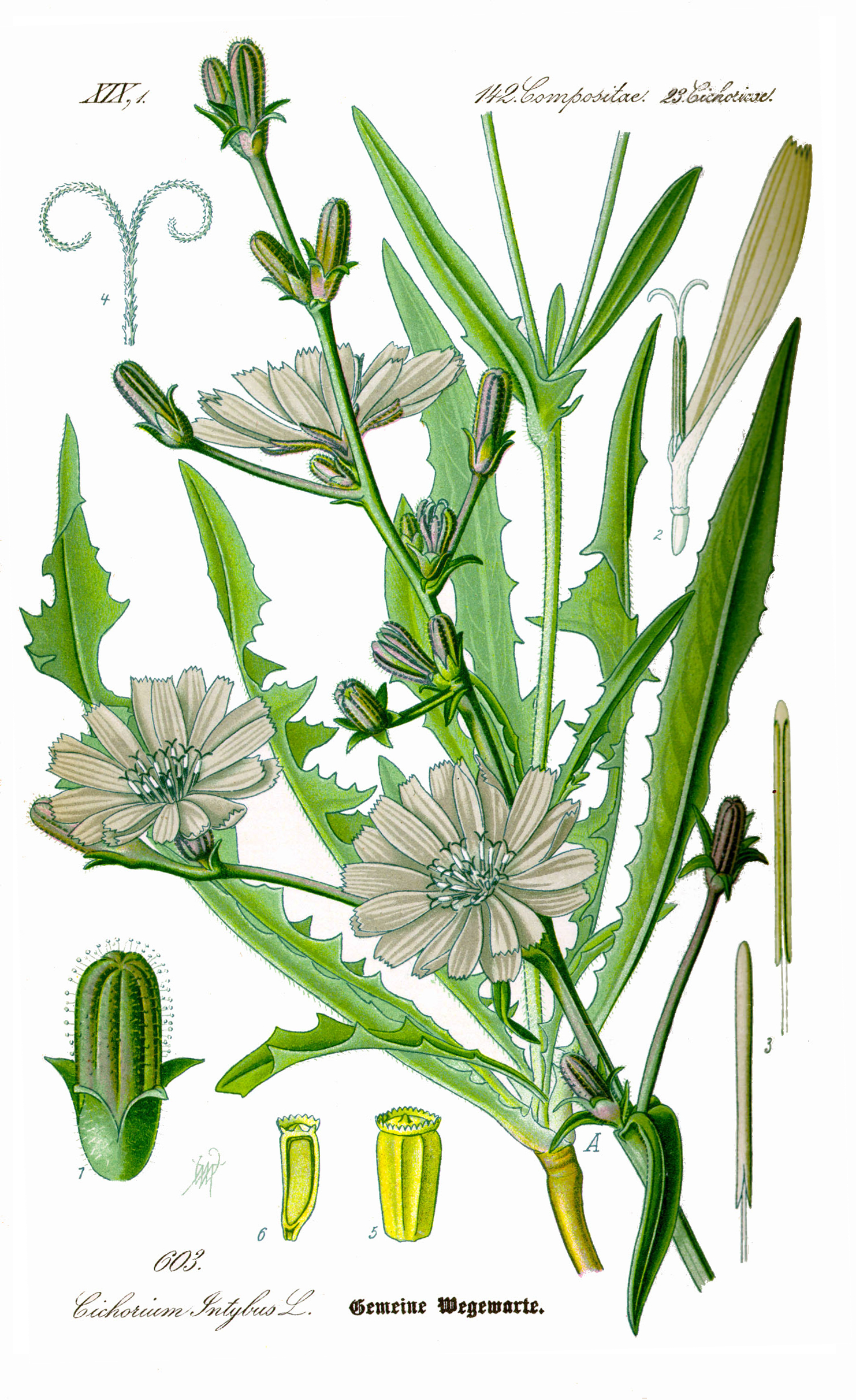
Botanical illustration (1885)

Common chicory (Cichorium intybus) is a somewhat woody, perennial herbaceous plant of the family Asteraceae, usually with bright blue flowers, rarely white or pink. Native to Europe, North Africa, and western Asia, it has been introduced to the Americas, Australia, and South Africa.

Many varieties are cultivated for salad leaves, chicons, or blanched buds, or roots (var. sativum), which are baked, ground, and used as a coffee substitute and food additive. In the 21st century, inulin, an extract from chicory root, has been used in food manufacturing as a sweetener and source of dietary fiber. Chicory is also grown as a forage crop for livestock.

== Description ==
When flowering, chicory has a tough, grooved, and more or less hairy stem. It can grow to 1.5 metres (5 feet) tall. The leaves are stalked, lanceolate and unlobed; they range from 7.5 to 32 centimetres (3 to 12 1/2 inches) in length (smallest near the top) and 2 to 8 cm (3/4 to 3 1/4 in) wide. The flower heads are 3–5 cm (1 1/4–2 in) wide, and usually light blue or lavender; it has also rarely been described as white or pink. Of the two rows of involucral bracts, the inner is longer and erect, the outer is shorter and spreading. It flowers from March until October. The seed has small scales at the tip.

Substances that contribute to the plant's bitterness are primarily the two sesquiterpene lactones, lactucin and lactucopicrin. Other components are aesculetin, aesculin, cichoriin, umbelliferone, scopoletin, 6,7-dihydrocoumarin, and further sesquiterpene lactones and their glycosides. Around 1970, it was discovered that the root contains up to 20% inulin, a polysaccharide similar to starch.

== Names ==
Common chicory is also known as blue daisy, blue dandelion, blue sailors, blue weed, and wild endive, among other regional names. ("Cornflower" is also commonly applied to Centaurea cyanus.) Common names for varieties of var. foliosum include endive, radicchio, radichetta, Belgian endive, French endive, red endive, sugarloaf, and witloof (or witlof).

The scientific genus name Cichorium is ultimately from Ancient Greek: κίχορα, romanized: kíkhora : kíkhora, meaning endive. The species name intybus is a variant of Latin: intibus also meaning endive. Moreover, intibus is the ultimate etymological source of the English word endive.

The scientific binomial for the "true endive" is not Cichorium intybus but rather Cichorium endivia.

== Distribution and habitat ==
Chicory is native to western Asia, North Africa, and Europe. It lives as a wild plant on roadsides in Europe. The plant was brought to North America by early European colonists. It is also common in China and Australia, where it has become widely naturalized.

It is more common in areas with abundant rain.

== Ecology ==
Chicory is both a cultivated crop and a weedy plant with a cosmopolitan distribution. Analysis of introduced weedy populations in North America has revealed that naturalized weedy chicory is partially descended from domesticated cultivars.

Chicory grows in roadsides, waste places, and other disturbed areas, and can survive in lawns due to its ability to resprout from its low basal rosette of leaves. It typically does not enter undisturbed natural areas. It most prefers limestone soils, but tolerates an array of conditions. Bees, butterflies, and flies feed upon it. Chicory is classified as a drought tolerant plant.

== Uses ==
=== Culinary ===
Chicory greens, raw
Nutritional value per 100 g (3.5 oz)
- Energy: 96 kJ (23 kcal)
- Carbohydrates: 4.7 g
- Sugars: 0.7 g
- Dietary fiber: 4 g
- Fat: 0.3 g
- Protein: 1.7 g
Vitamins and minerals
Vitamins	Quantity %DV^{†}
Vitamin A equiv. beta-Carotene lutein zeaxanthin	32% 286 μg 32% 3430 μg 10300 μg
Thiamine (B1)	5% 0.06 mg
Riboflavin (B2)	8% 0.1 mg
Niacin (B3)	3% 0.5 mg
Pantothenic acid (B5)	23% 1.159 mg
Vitamin B6	6% 0.105 mg
Folate (B9)	28% 110 μg
Vitamin C	27% 24 mg
Vitamin E	15% 2.26 mg
Vitamin K	248% 297.6 μg
Minerals	Quantity %DV^{†}
Calcium	8% 100 mg
Iron	5% 0.9 mg
Magnesium	7% 30 mg
Manganese	19% 0.429 mg
Phosphorus	4% 47 mg
Potassium	14% 420 mg
Sodium	2% 45 mg
Zinc	4% 0.42 mg
- Other constituents: Quantity
- Water: 92 g
- Link to USDA Database entry
- ^{†}Percentages estimated using US recommendations for adults, except for potassium, which is estimated based on expert recommendation from the National Academies.

Belgian endive (witloof), raw
Nutritional value per 100 g (3.5 oz)
- Energy: 71 kJ (17 kcal)
- Carbohydrates: 4 g
- Dietary fiber: 3.1 g
- Fat: 0.1 g
- Protein: 0.9 g
Vitamins and minerals
Vitamins	Quantity %DV^{†}
Thiamine (B1)	5% 0.062 mg
Riboflavin (B2)	2% 0.027 mg
Niacin (B3)	1% 0.16 mg
Pantothenic acid (B5)	3% 0.145 mg
Vitamin B6	2% 0.042 mg
Folate (B9)	9% 37 μg
Vitamin C	3% 2.8 mg
Minerals	Quantity %DV^{†}
Calcium	1% 19 mg
Iron	1% 0.24 mg
Magnesium	2% 10 mg
Manganese	4% 0.1 mg
Phosphorus	2% 26 mg
Potassium	7% 211 mg
Sodium	0% 2 mg
Zinc	1% 0.16 mg
- Other constituents: Quantity
- Water: 94 g
- Link to USDA Database entry
- ^{†}Percentages estimated using US recommendations for adults, except for potassium, which is estimated based on expert recommendation from the National Academies.

The entire plant is edible.

Raw chicory leaves are 92% water, 5% carbohydrates, 2% protein, and contain negligible fat. In a 100-gram (3 1/2 oz) (3½ oz) reference amount, raw chicory leaves provide 23 calories (96 J) and significant amounts (more than 20% of the Daily Value) of vitamin K, vitamin A, vitamin C, some B vitamins, and manganese. Vitamin E and calcium are present in moderate amounts. Raw endive is 94% water and has low nutrient content.

==== Root chicory ====
Root chicory (Cichorium intybus var. sativum) has long been cultivated in Europe as a coffee substitute. The roots are baked, roasted, ground, and used as an additive, especially in the Mediterranean region (where the plant is native). As a coffee additive, it is also mixed in Indian filter coffee and in parts of Southeast Asia, South Africa, and the southern United States, particularly in New Orleans. In France, a mixture of 60% chicory and 40% coffee is sold under the trade name Ricoré. It has been more widely used during economic crises such as the Great Depression in the 1930s and during World War II in Continental Europe. Chicory, with sugar beet and rye, was used as an ingredient of the East German Mischkaffee (mixed coffee), introduced during the "East German coffee crisis" of 1976–1979. It is also added to coffee in Spanish, Turkish, Syrian, Lebanese and Palestinian cuisines.

Some beer brewers use roasted chicory to add flavor to stouts (commonly expected to have a coffee-like flavor). Others have added it to strong blond Belgian-style ales, to augment the hops, making a witloofbier, from the Dutch name for the plant.

The roots can also be cooked like parsnips.

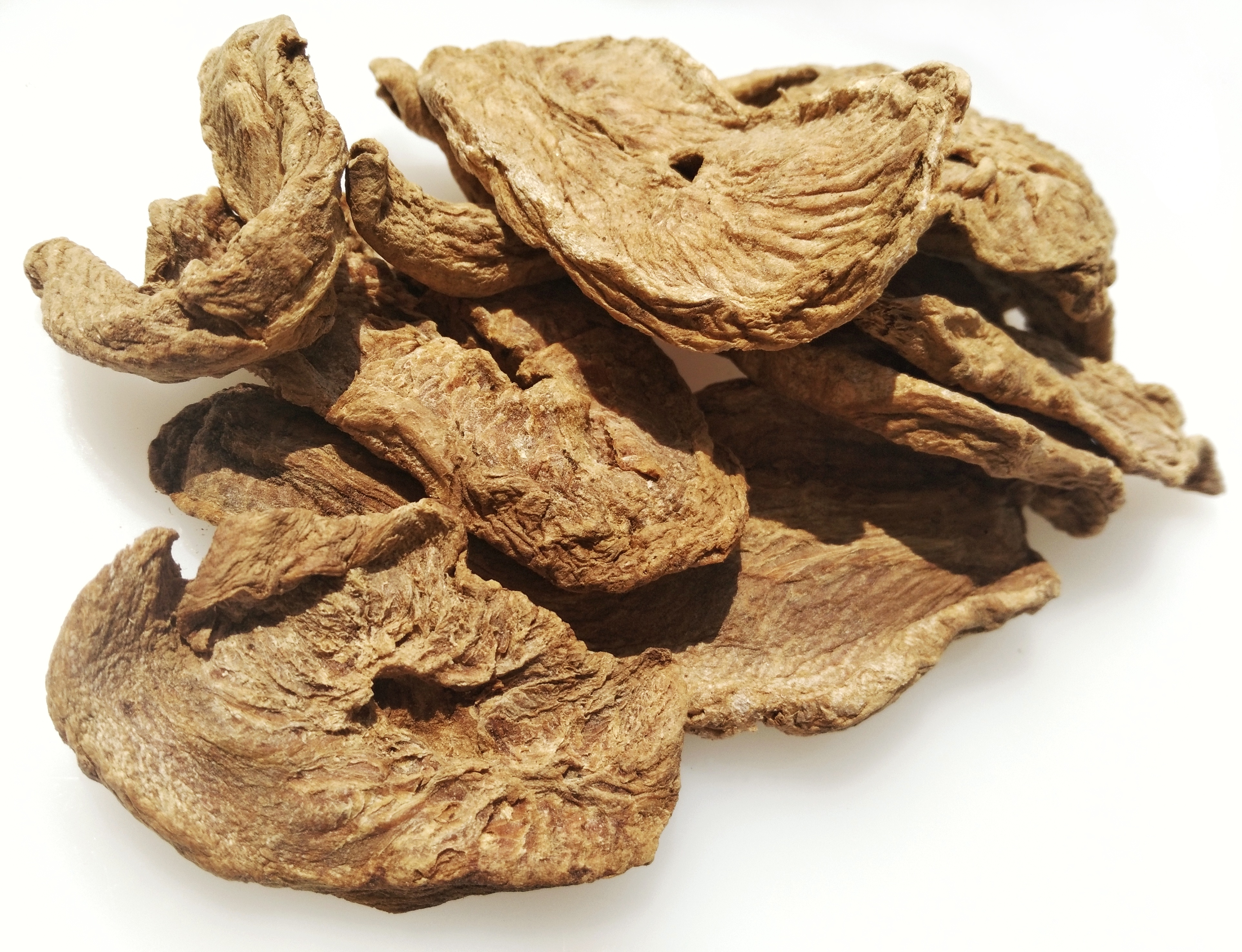
Dried chicory root

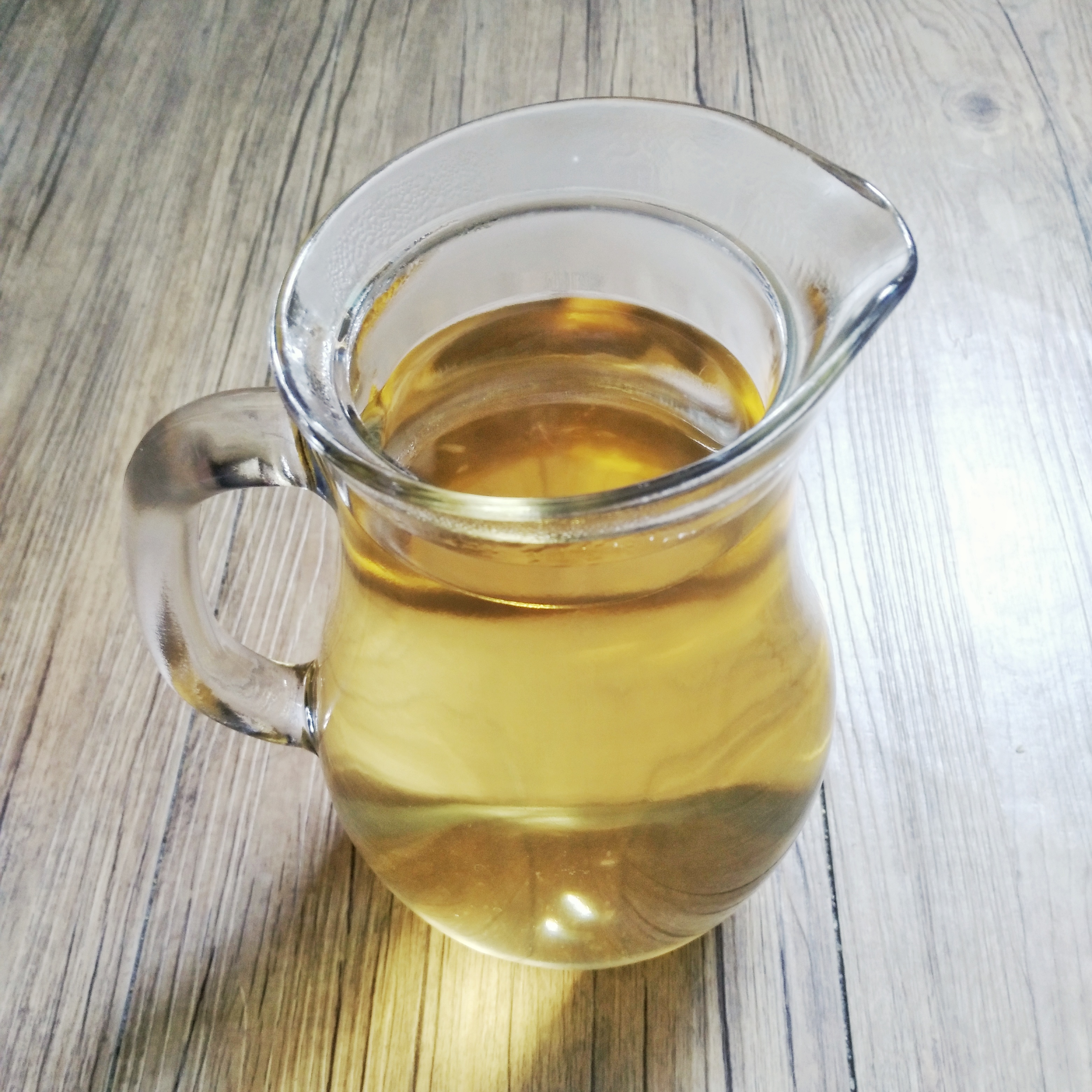
Korean chicory tea made from dried chicory root

===== Chicory root and inulin =====
Inulin is mainly found in the plant family Asteraceae as a storage carbohydrate (e.g. Jerusalem artichoke, dahlia, and yacon). It acts as dietary fiber in the human gut and is added to food such as yogurts as a 'prebiotic'. It is mildly sweet, with 10% of the sweetening power of sucrose. It can be hydrolyzed to produce fructose, an industrially useful sweetener.

Fresh chicory root may contain 13–23% inulin as a percentage of its total carbohydrate content. Chicory cultivars for inulin production are derived from root chicory.

==== Leaf chicory ====
===== Wild =====
While edible raw, wild chicory leaves usually have a bitter taste, especially the older leaves. The flavor is appreciated in certain cuisines, such as in the Ligurian and Apulian regions of Italy and also in the southern part of India. In Ligurian cuisine, wild chicory leaves are an ingredient of preboggion and in the Apulian region, wild chicory leaves are combined with fava bean puree in the traditional local dish fave e cicorie selvatiche. In Albania, the leaves are used as a spinach substitute, mainly served simmered and marinated in olive oil, or as ingredient in fillings for byrek. In Greece a variety of wild chicory found in Crete and known as stamnagathi (spiny chicory) is used as a salad served with olive oil and lemon juice.

By cooking and discarding the water, the bitterness is reduced, after which the chicory leaves may be sautéed with garlic, anchovies, and other ingredients. In this form, the resulting greens might be combined with pasta or accompany meat dishes.

===== Cultivated =====
Chicory may be cultivated for its leaves, usually eaten raw as salad leaves. Cultivated chicory is generally divided into three types, of which there are many varieties:

- Radicchio usually has variegated red or red and green leaves. Some only refer to the white-veined red-leaved type as radicchio, also known as red endive and red chicory. It has a bitter and spicy taste, which mellows when it is grilled or roasted. It can also be used to add color and zest to salads. It is largely used in Italy in different varieties, the most famous being the ones from Treviso (known as radicchio rosso di Treviso), from Verona (radicchio di Verona), and Chioggia (radicchio di Chioggia), which are classified as an IGP. It is also common in Greece, where it is known as radiki and mainly boiled in salads, and is used in pies.

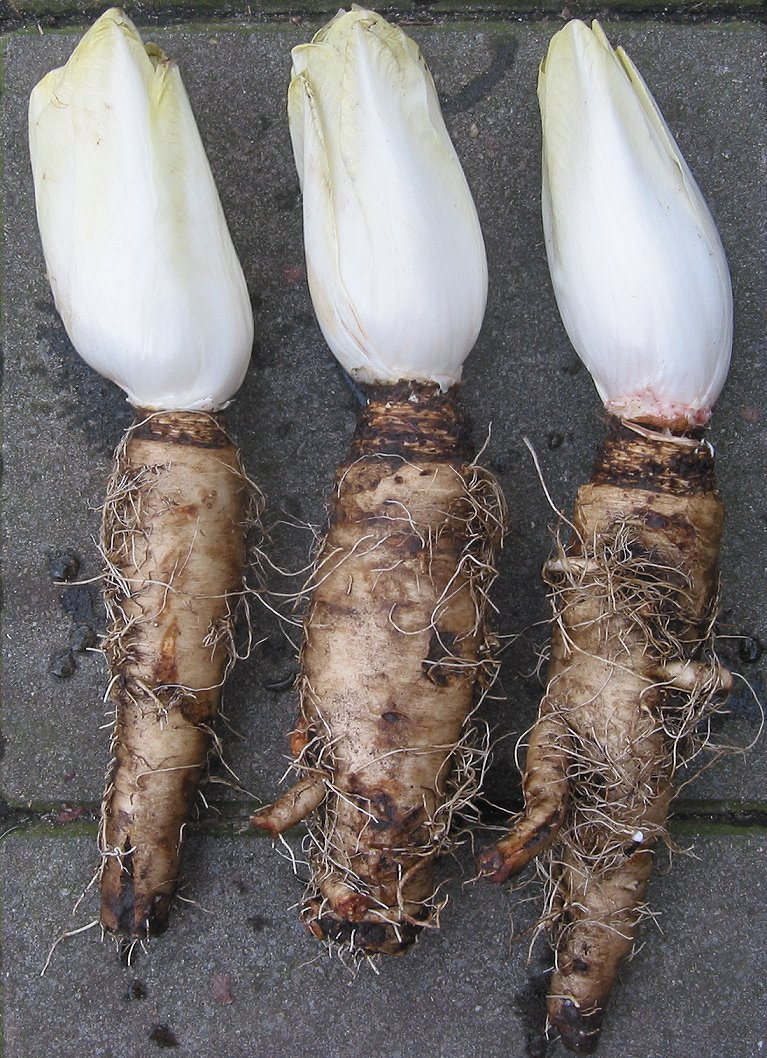
Witloof, Belgian endive

- Belgian endive is known in Dutch as witloof or witlof ("white leaf"), indivia in Italy, endivias in Spain, chicory in the UK, as witlof in Australia, endive in France and Canada, and chicon in parts of northern France, in Wallonia and (in French) in Luxembourg. It has a small head of cream-colored, bitter leaves. The harvested root is allowed to sprout indoors in the absence of sunlight, which prevents the leaves from turning green and opening up (etiolation). It is often sold wrapped in blue paper to protect it from light, so as to preserve its pale color and delicate flavor. The smooth, creamy white leaves may be served stuffed, baked, boiled, cut, or cooked in a milk sauce, or simply cut raw. The tender leaves are slightly bitter; the whiter the leaf, the less bitter the taste. The harder inner part of the stem at the bottom of the head can be cut out before cooking to prevent bitterness. Belgium exports chicon/witloof to over 40 countries. The technique for growing these blanched endives was accidentally discovered in the 1850s at the Botanical Garden of Brussels in Saint-Josse-ten-Noode, Belgium. Today France is the largest producer of endive.
- Catalogna chicory (Cichorium intybus var. foliosum), also known as puntarelle, includes a whole subfamily (some varieties from Belgian endive and some from radicchio) of chicory and is used throughout Italy.

Although leaf chicory is often called "endive", true endive (Cichorium endivia) is a different species in the same genus, distinct from Belgian endive.

=== Traditional use ===
Chicory root contains essential oils similar to those found in plants in the related genus Tanacetum. In alternative medicine, chicory has been listed as one of the 38 plants used to prepare Bach flower remedies.

=== Forage ===
Chicory is highly digestible for ruminants and has a low fiber concentration. Chicory roots were once considered an "excellent substitute for oats" for horses due to their protein and fat content. Chicory contains a low quantity of reduced tannins that may increase protein utilization efficiency in ruminants.

Some tannins reduce intestinal parasites. Dietary chicory may be toxic to internal parasites, with studies of ingesting chicory by farm animals having lower worm burdens, leading to its use as a forage supplement. Although chicory might have originated in France, Italy and India, much development of chicory for use with livestock has been undertaken in New Zealand.

Forage varieties include:

- 'Puna' ('Grasslands Puna'): Developed in New Zealand, Grasslands Puna is well adapted to different climates, being grown from Alberta, Canada, New Mexico, Florida to Australia. It is resistant to bolting, which leads to high nutrient levels in the leaves in spring. It also is able to quickly come back after grazing.
- 'Forage Feast': A variety from France used for human consumption and also for wildlife plots, where animals such as deer might graze. It is resistant to bolting. It is very cold-hardy, and being lower in tannins than other forage varieties, is suitable for human consumption.
- 'Choice': has been bred for high winter and early-spring growth activity, and lower amounts of lactucin and lactone, which are believed to taint milk. It is also used for seeding deer wildlife plots.
- 'Oasis': was bred for increased lactone rates for the forage industry, and for higher resistance to fungal diseases such as Sclerotinia (mainly s. minor and S. sclerotiorum.)
- 'Puna II': This variety is more winter-active than most others, which leads to greater persistence and longevity.
- 'Grouse': A New Zealand variety, it is used as a planting companion for forage brassicas. More prone to early flowering than other varieties, it has higher crowns more susceptible to overbrowsing.
- 'Six Point': A United States variety, winter hardy and resistant to bolting. It is very similar to Puna.

Others varieties known include; 'Chico', 'Ceres Grouse', 'Good Hunt', 'El Nino' and 'Lacerta'.

== History ==
The plant has a history reaching back to ancient Egypt. In ancient Rome, a dish called puntarelle was made with chicory sprouts. It was mentioned by Horace in reference to his own diet, which he describes as very simple: Me pascunt olivae, me cichorea levesque malvae ("As for me, olives, endives, and light mallows provide sustenance"). Chicory was first described as a cultivated plant in the 17th century. When coffee was introduced to Europe, the Dutch thought that chicory made a lively addition to the bean drink.

In 1766, Frederick the Great banned the importation of coffee into Prussia, leading to the development of a coffee substitute by Brunswick innkeeper Christian Gottlieb Förster (died 1801), who gained a concession in 1769–70 to manufacture it in Brunswick and Berlin. By 1795, 22 to 24 factories of this type were in Brunswick. Lord Monboddo describes the plant in 1779 as the "chicoree", which the French cultivated as a pot herb. In Napoleonic Era France, chicory frequently appeared as an adulterant in coffee, or as a coffee substitute. Chicory was also adopted as a coffee substitute by Confederate soldiers during the American Civil War, and has become common in the U.S. It was also used in the UK during World War II, where Camp Coffee, a coffee and chicory essence, has been on sale since 1885.

In the U.S., chicory root has long been used as a coffee substitute in prisons. By the 1840s, the port of New Orleans was the second-largest importer of coffee (after New York). Louisianans began to add chicory root to their coffee when Union naval blockades during the American Civil War cut off the port of New Orleans, thereby creating a long-standing tradition.

== In culture ==
Chicory is mentioned in certain ancient Chinese texts about silk production. Amongst traditional recommendations the primary caretaker of the silkworms, the "silkworm mother", should not eat or even touch it.

The chicory flower is often seen as inspiration for the Romantic concept of the Blue Flower (e.g. in German language Blauwarte ≈ blue lookout by the wayside). Similar to the springwort and moonwort, it could open locked doors, according to European folklore. However, the plant must be gathered at noon or midnight on St. James's Day and cut with gold while being silent, or else one would die afterwards.

Chicory was also believed to grant its possessor invisibility.

== Gallery ==
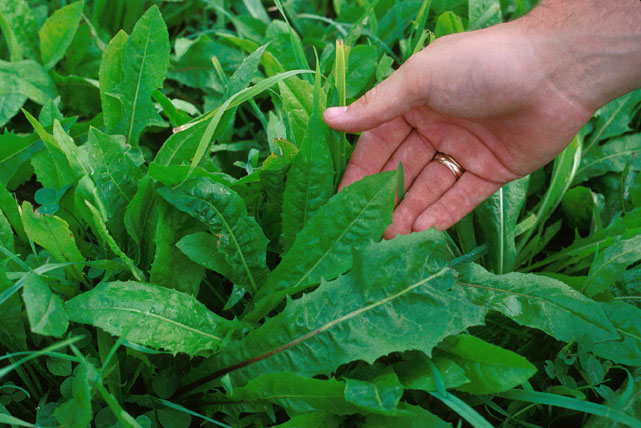
Leaves unlobed and pointed

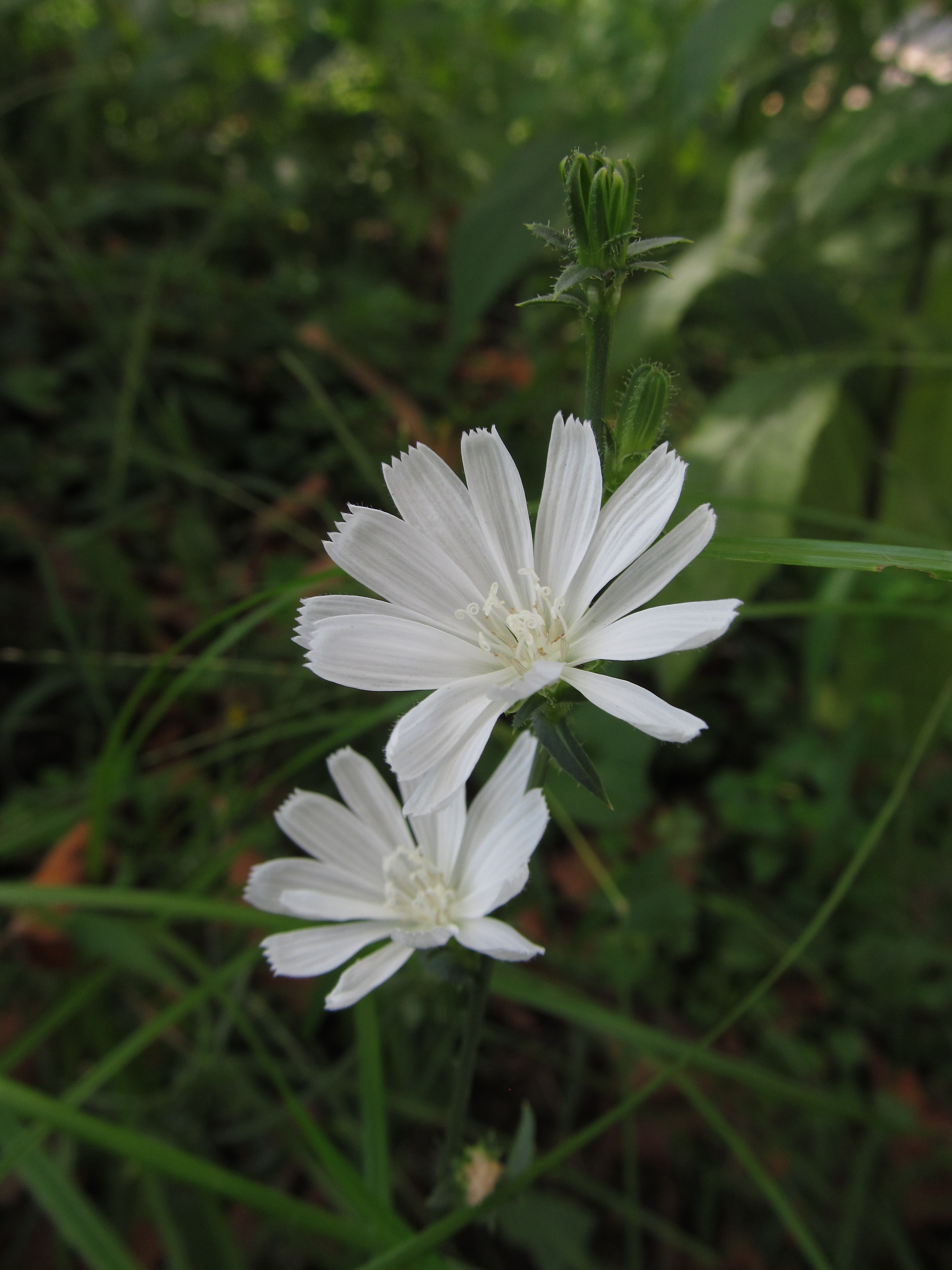
White form

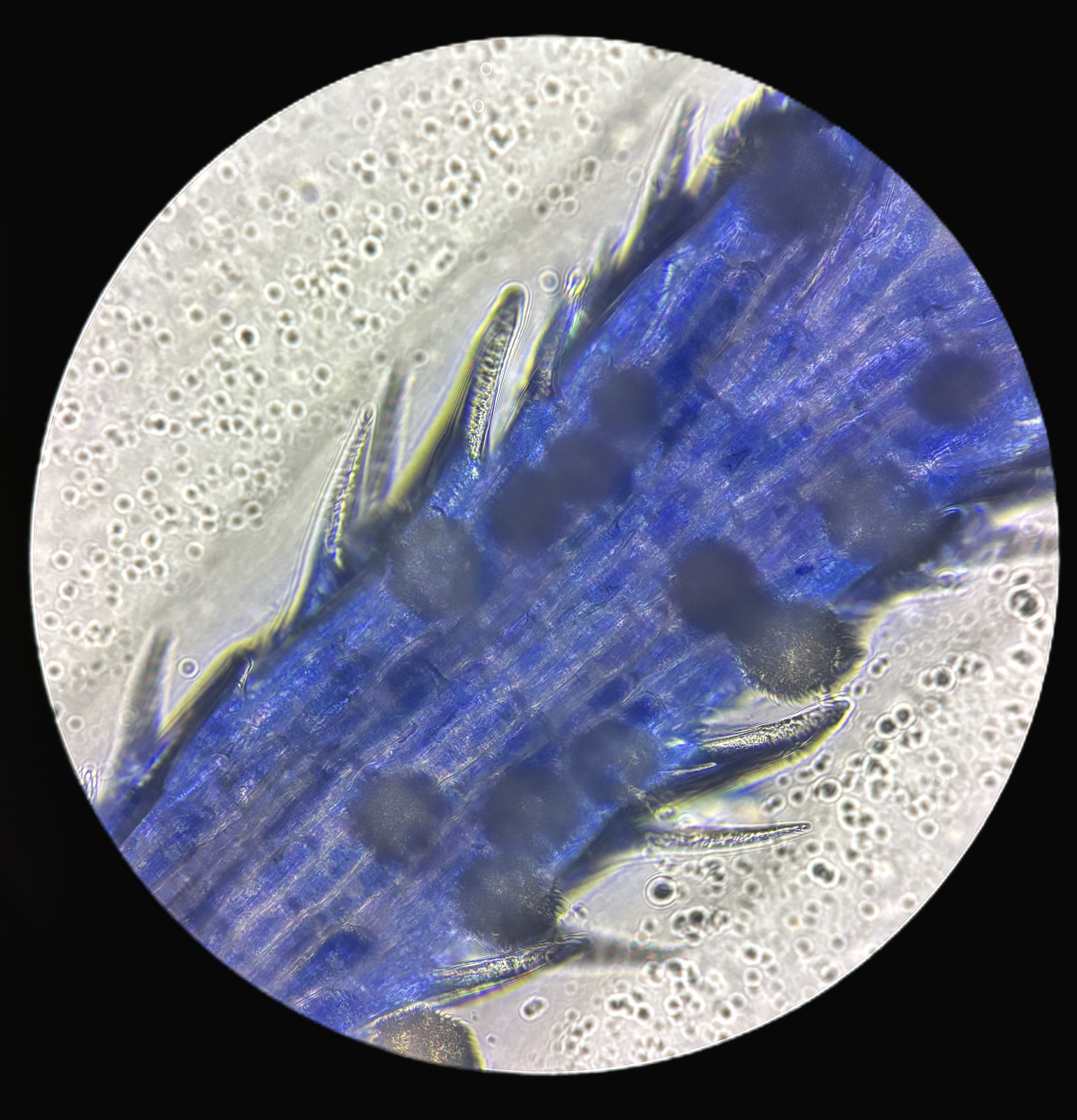
Stamen (100x)

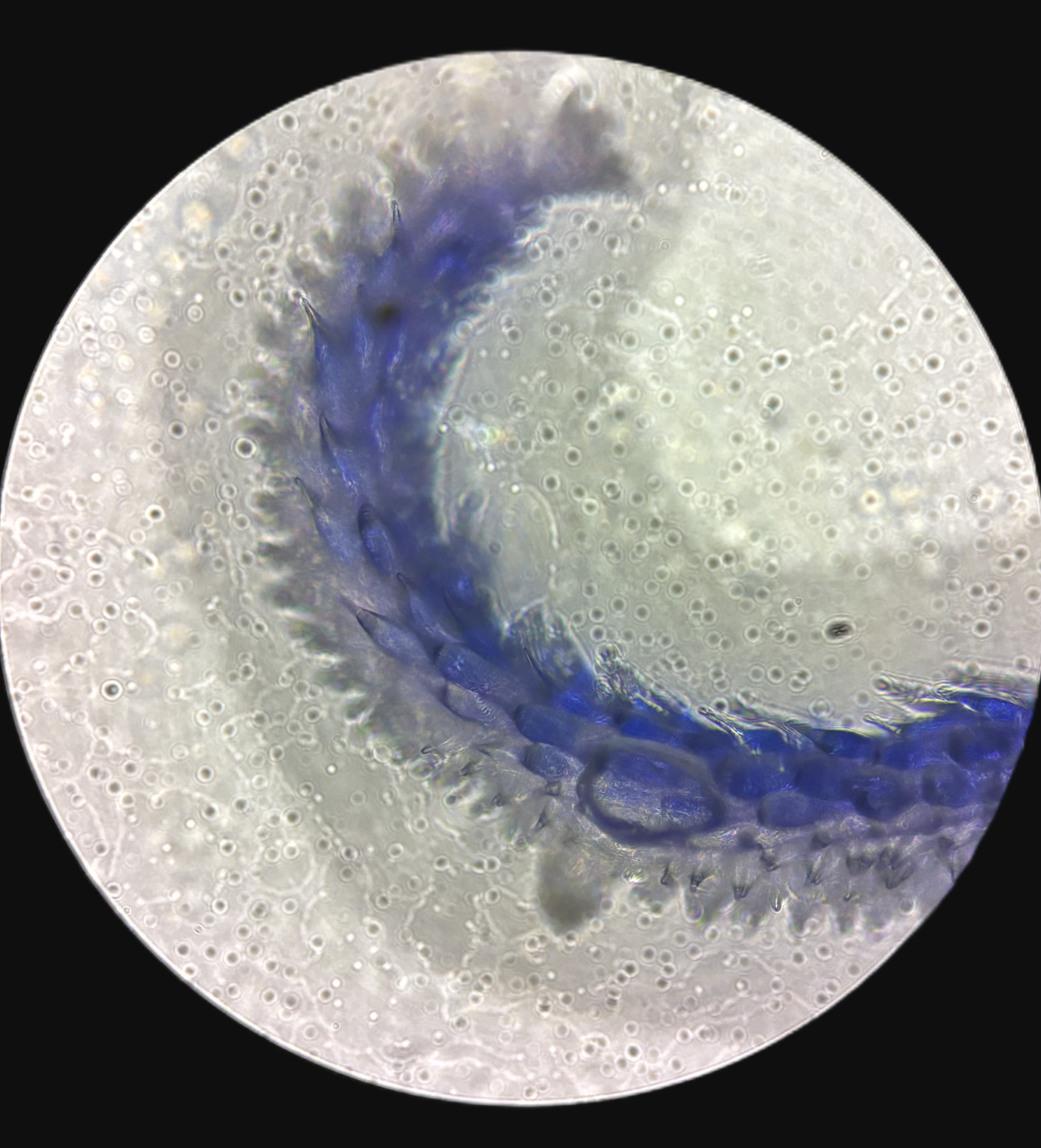
Anther (100x)

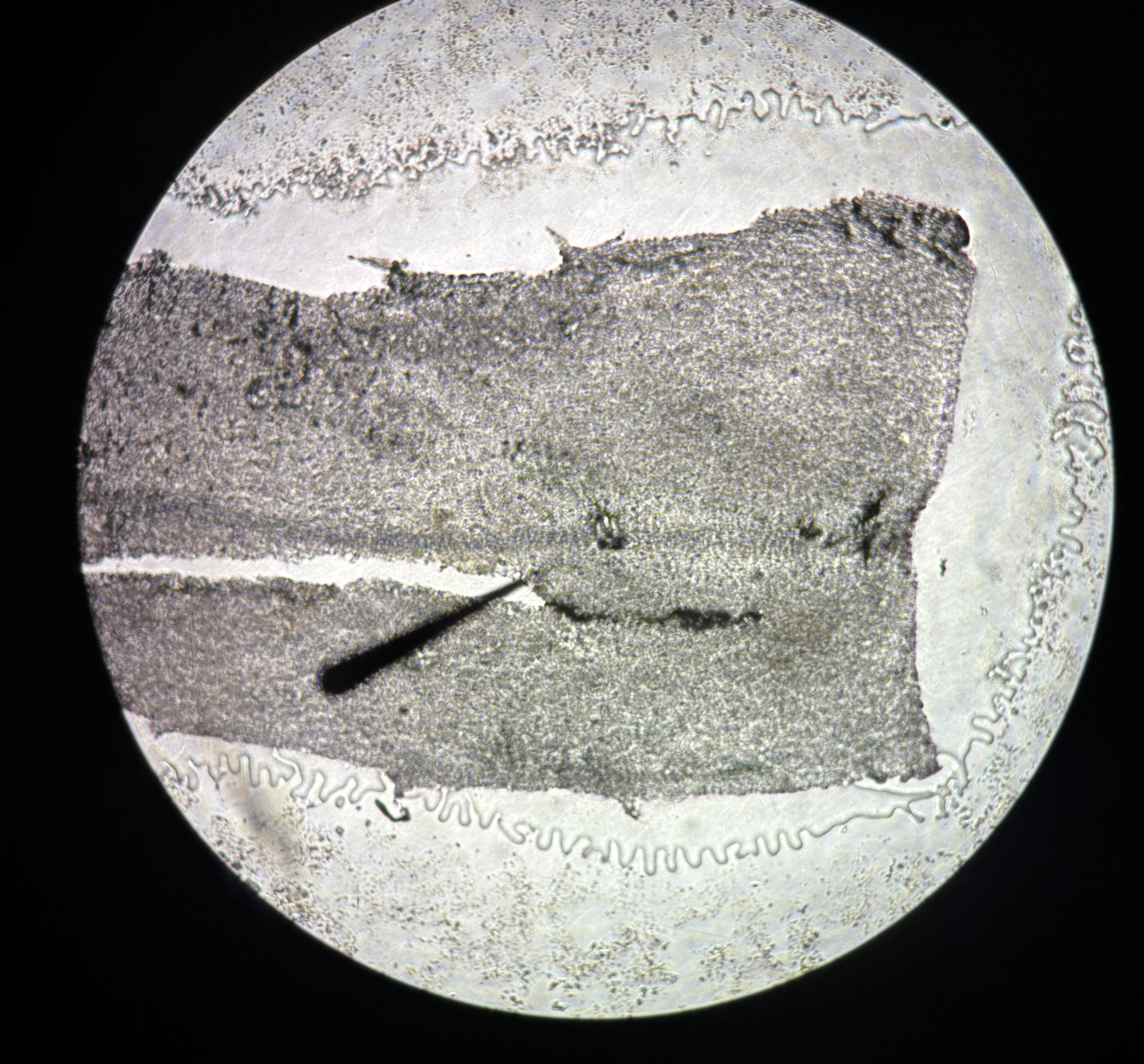
Stomata (40x)

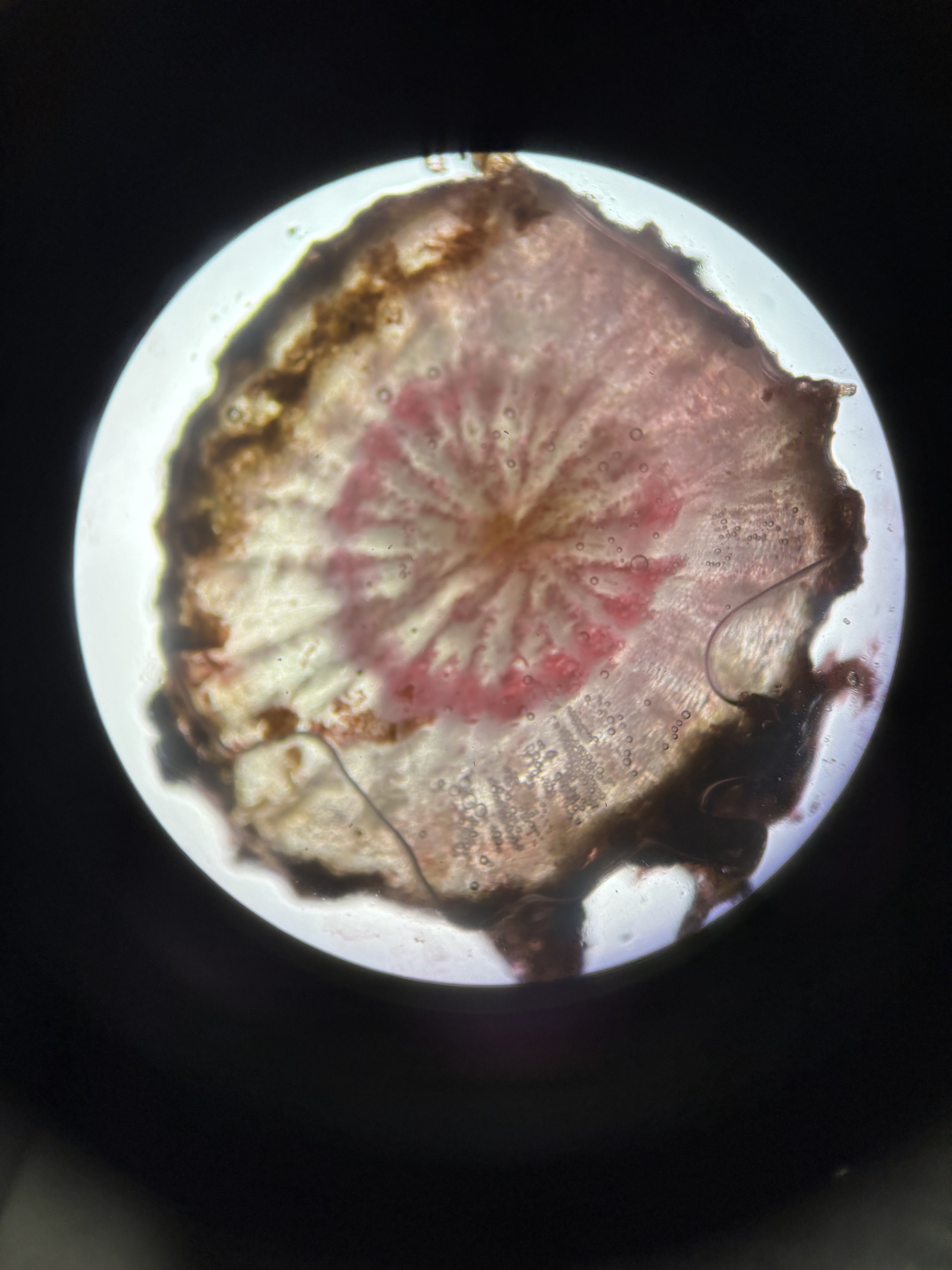
Root

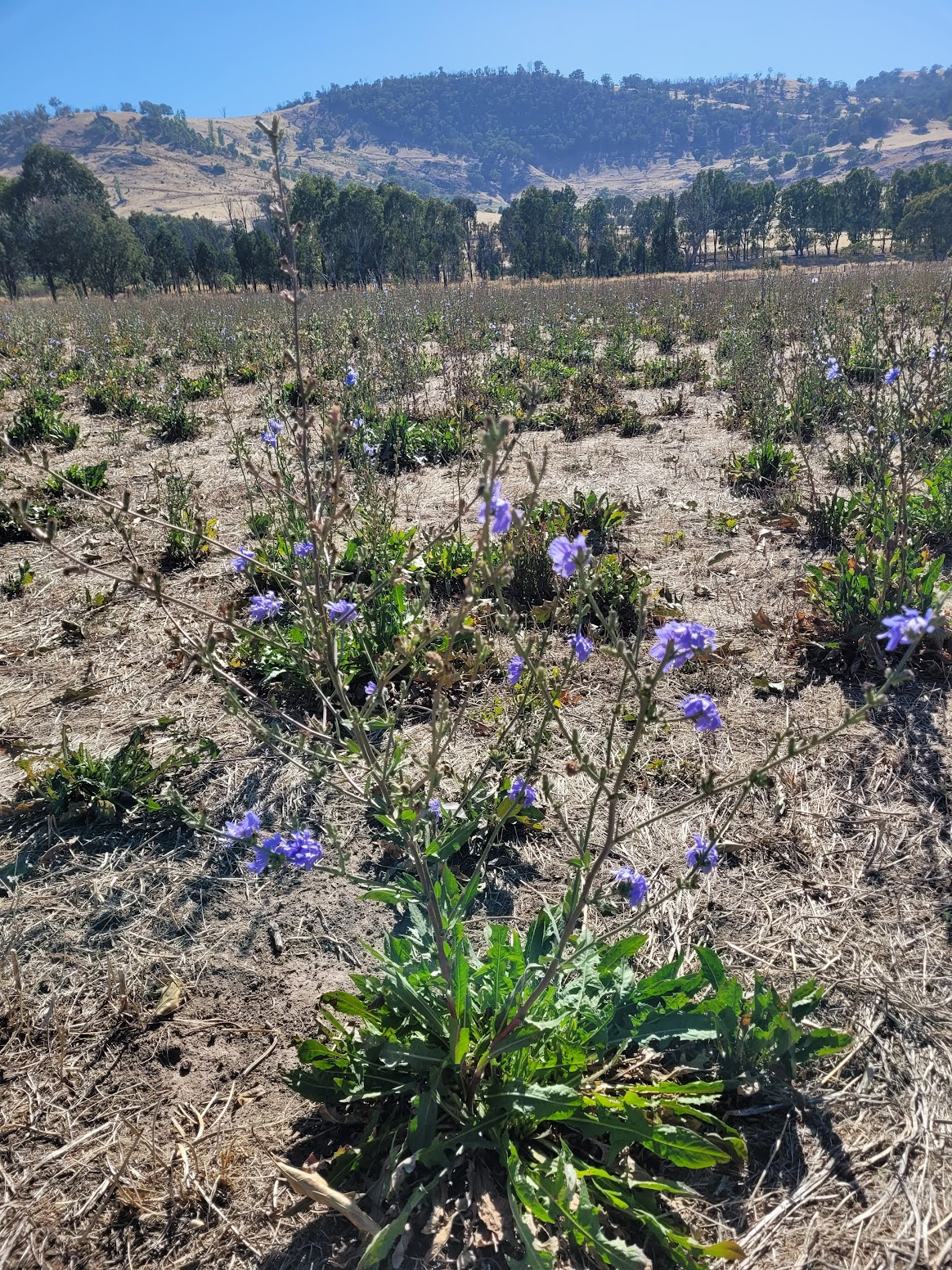
Chicory growing in a field in rural Australia, doing very well despite a heatwave and drought conditions. Summer 2026

Self-seeded on urban property in Aotearoa New Zealand

== See also ==
- Sugar substitute
- Cuisine and specialties of Nord-Pas-de-Calais
