= Another Day in Paradise (disambiguation) =

"Another Day in Paradise" is a Phil Collins song released in 1989.

Another Day in Paradise may also refer to:

- Another Day in Paradise (album), a 1994 album by Strung Out
- Another Day in Paradise (novel), a 1997 novel by Eddie Little
- Another Day in Paradise (film), a 1998 film based on the Eddie Little novel
- Another Day in Paradise, a 2001 book by Jim Toomey
- Another Day in Paradise (mixtape), a 2016 hip-hop album by rapper Belly
- Another Day in Paradise, a 2008 companion documentary to the TV series Carrier
- Jesse Jenkins (chef), who goes by Another Day In Paradise on social media

== See also ==
- Just Another Day in Paradise, a 1982 album and song by Bertie Higgins
- "Just Another Day in Paradise" (Phil Vassar song), a 2000 song by Phil Vassar
- Another Day in Fucking Paradise, a 2016 album by the Fred Frith Trio
