= Just One Day =

Just One Day may refer to:

== Events ==
- Just One Day, an animal rights event spearheaded by the No Kill Advocacy Center

== Literature ==
- Just One Day, a 2013 Gayle Forman novel

== Music ==
=== Albums ===
- Just One Day, a 2009 release by Kim Sozzi
- Just One Day EP, a 2007 release by Kevin Griffin and Jeremy Lister

=== Songs ===
- "Just One Day", a song by Anything Box off of Peace
- "Just One Day", a song by the Bangtan Boys off of Skool Luv Affair
- "Just One Day", a song by Better Than Ezra off of Paper Empire

== See also ==
- Just Another Day (disambiguation)
- Just For One Day (disambiguation)
- "Just a Day", a song by Feeder
