= Jesse Jenkins (cook) =

American and British chef and restauranteur

- Born: Los Angeles, California
- Occupations: Cook, photographer, influencer, skateboarder

Jesse Jenkins, who also goes by Another Day in Paradise and ADIP on social media, is an American cook, (Note: Jenkins prefers to identify as a cook, rather than a chef.) social media influencer, photographer, and skateboarder based in London. He is best known for his cooking social media. Prior to this, he was a photographer and a skateboarder. He published his first cookbook, Cooking With Vegetables, in 2025. It became a Sunday Times Bestseller almost instantly.

== Biography ==
Jenkins, raised in Los Angeles, began as a skateboarder, and became sponsored by age 12. However, he soon realized that skateboarding wasn't a stable career. He began working in kitchens as a busboy and rose through the ranks in various roles, including as a dishwasher, line cook, and prep chef.

At 20, he moved to London, where he has lived since. He worked at a restaurant, but struggled to make ends meet, so also became a photographer's assistant and a fashion photographer himself.

During the COVID-19 lockdowns, he created an Instagram account in which he created food-focused content. The account soon went viral and became his full-time job. His food is known for its vegetable-forward nature, "fast, fresh, and filthy" style, and cinematic visuals. He is also known for not talking in his videos, instead amplifying the sound of cooking, and for always showing his empty plate at the end. His signature dish is his aubergine parmesan.

He has put out new recipes every two weeks with French magazine Le Monde: previous recipes have included chicken with parsnips and radicchio and a beetroot-goat cheese tart. He has also contributed recipes to the BBC. He had a three-month residency with London hotel Brown's Hotel and partnered with health restaurant chain atis for a bowl.

He released his first cookbook, Cooking with Vegetables, in 2025. It was published by Bluebird, and became an instant Sunday Times bestseller.

He also co-founded sparkling water brand YEW.
