= Kahit Isang Araw Lang Unity Run =

2012 running race in Pasay, Philippines

- Date: 2012
- Location: Philippines
- Event type: Running race
- Primary sponsor: UNTV
- Website: www.isangarawlang.org

Kahit Isang Araw Lang Unity Run was a run organized by UNTV. It was held in the SM Mall of Asia, Pasay, Metro Manila, Philippines, on January 22, 2012. Daniel Razon CEO of UNTV, wanted to create a fun run for education with at least 300,000 participants.

The "Adapt A School Project" is one of their initiatives. The 2012 Unity Run was the second charity fun run organized by Breakthroughs and Milestone Productions International through Razon and marketing firm Avant Garde Creatives. In 2010, the record-breaking Kahit Isang Araw Lang - Takbo Para sa Libreng Kolehiyo (Just for One Day - Run for Free College) attracted more than 50,000 runners. The event was the second project formed between Razon and the former head for the Adopt-a-School program.

The run also funded two units of classroom on wheels, called Dunong-Gulong.

The Department of Education participated in Kahit Isang Araw Lang Unity Run.

The run was planned to go to different cities.
