= Just for One Day (film) =

- Directed by: Yohannes Feleke
- Screenplay by: Yohannes Feleke
- Produced by: Render Picture
- Cinematography: Samuel Tesfaye
- Edited by: Samuel Tesfaye
- Music by: Taddele Feleke
- Release date: 2008
- Running time: 10 minutes
- Country: Ethiopia

Just for One Day is an Ethiopian 2008 short documentary film.

== Synopsis ==
The portrait of a single mother as she tries to make a living for her daughter and herself on the outskirts of Addis Abeba, Ethiopia.

== Awards ==
- Ethiopian IFF 2009
