= Just Another Day =

Just Another Day may refer to:

== Music ==
- Just Another Day (album), an album by Wire Daisies
- "Just Another Day...", a song by Queen Latifah
- "Just Another Day", a song by The Game from the album Compton
- "Just Another Day", a song by Too Short from the album Get in Where You Fit In
- "Just Another Day" (Jon Secada song)
- "Just Another Day" (Jonathan Wilkes song)
- "Just Another Day", a song by Jade Valerie from Out of the Box
- "Just Another Day", a song by John Cena from You Can't See Me
- "Just Another Day" (John Mellencamp song)
- "Just Another Day", a song by Lady Gaga from the deluxe version of Joanne
- "Just Another Day", a song by Oingo Boingo from Dead Man's Party
- "Just Another Day", a song from the musical Next to Normal

== Film and television ==
- Just Another Day (film), a 2008 short film by Hisham Zreiq
- Just Another Day (TV series), a 1980s BBC documentary series narrated by John Pitman
- Just Another Day (2007 TV series), a TV program on the History Channel UK presented by Adam Hart-Davis
- "Just Another Day" (North Square), a 2000 television episode
- "Just Another Day", an episode of Pee-wee's Playhouse

== See also ==
- Just One Day (disambiguation)
- "Another Day" (Paul McCartney song)
