= Another Day (The Hurt Process EP) =

EP by The Hurt Process
- Released: 2002
- Recorded: December 2001–May 2002
- Genre: Hardcore emo, metalcore
- Length: 24:39
- Label: Loudspeaker
- Producer: Dave Chang, Joe Gibbs

The Hurt Process chronology
Another Day (2002)	Drive By Monologue (2004)

Professional ratings
Review scores
Source	Rating
Metal Invader	2.5/5 stars

Another Day is the debut EP by English hardcore emo/metalcore group The Hurt Process, released on the Loudspeaker label in 2002 (see 2003 in music).

== Track listing ==
1. "Intro" – 1:26
2. "Two Months From A Year" – 3:59
3. "Another Day" – 3:34
4. "Powder Burn" – 3:39
5. "Encouraging Reflection" – 3:26
6. "Subsistence" – 4:12
7. "Black Umbrella" – 4:23
