= Radicchio =

Leaf vegetable

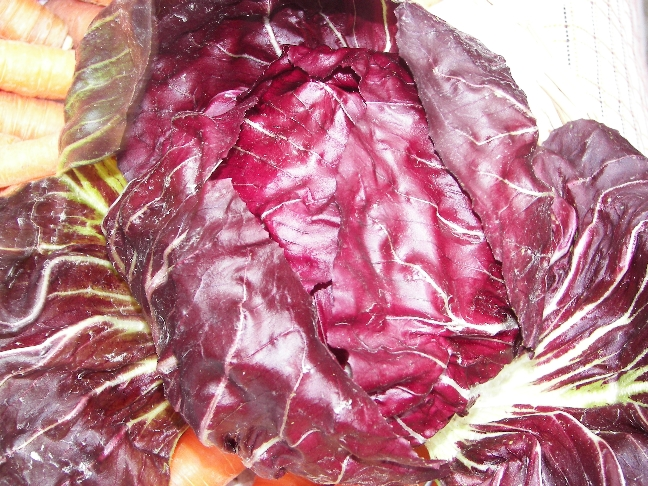
- Species: Cichorium intybus var. foliosum
- Cultivar group: Radicchio group

Radicchio, raw
Nutritional value per 100 g (3.5 oz)
- Energy: 96 kJ (23 kcal)
- Carbohydrates: 4.48 g
- Sugars: 0.6 g
- Dietary fiber: 0.9 g
- Fat: 0.25 g
- Protein: 1.43 g
Vitamins and minerals
Vitamins	Quantity %DV^{†}
Vitamin A equiv. lutein zeaxanthin	8832 μg
Thiamine (B1)	1% 0.016 mg
Riboflavin (B2)	2% 0.028 mg
Niacin (B3)	2% 0.255 mg
Pantothenic acid (B5)	5% 0.269 mg
Vitamin B6	3% 0.057 mg
Folate (B9)	15% 60 μg
Vitamin C	9% 8 mg
Vitamin E	15% 2.26 mg
Vitamin K	213% 255.2 μg
Minerals	Quantity %DV^{†}
Calcium	1% 19 mg
Iron	3% 0.57 mg
Magnesium	3% 13 mg
Manganese	6% 0.138 mg
Phosphorus	3% 40 mg
Potassium	10% 302 mg
Sodium	1% 22 mg
Zinc	6% 0.62 mg
- Link to USDA database entry
- ^{†}Percentages estimated using US recommendations for adults, except for potassium, which is estimated based on expert recommendation from the National Academies.

Radicchio (Note: English: /rəˈdɪkioʊ/ rə-DIK-ee-oh or /rəˈdiːkioʊ/ rə-DEE-kee-oh, Italian: [raˈdikkjo]; Venetian: radicio [ɾaˈditʃo].) is a perennial cultivated form of leaf chicory (Cichorium intybus, Asteraceae), commonly used in Italian cuisine. It is grown as a leaf vegetable and usually has colourful, white-veined red leaves that form a head. Radicchio has a bitter and spicy taste that mellows if it is grilled or roasted.

== History ==
Pliny the Elder wrote in Naturalis Historia that radicchio was useful as a blood purifier and an aid for insomniacs. Radicchio contains intybin, a sedative/analgesic, as well as a type of flavonoid, called anthocyanin.

Modern cultivation of the plant began in the fifteenth century in the Veneto, Friuli-Venezia Giulia and Trentino regions of Italy, but the deep-red radicchio of today was engineered in 1860 by Belgian agronomist Francesco Van den Borre, who used a technique called imbianchimento (whitening), preforcing, or blanching to create the dark red, white-veined leaves. The plants are taken from the soil and placed in water in darkened sheds, where lack of light and ensuing inhibition of chlorophyll production cause the plants to lose their green pigmentation.

== Varieties ==
The varieties of radicchio are named after the Italian regions where they originate: the most widely available variety in the United States is radicchio di Chioggia, the most popular and widely used variety. It is a round head of the plant, which means it offers the consumer the most uninterrupted surface of the deep red colouring. It was created through genetic selection by local farmers in the early 1900s for this reason. The IGP area for Chioggia includes just ten towns from the boroughs of Venice (where one finds Chioggia itself), Padua, and Rovigo. Radicchio rosso di Treviso precoce is a longer head than Chioggia, and the white veins are more pronounced. It has a distinctive bitter taste, and the heads are blanched as per the endive procedure to achieve the coloring and flavoring (heads are tied and left without light for two to three weeks post-harvest). The IGP area includes 24 towns in the boroughs of Treviso, Venice, and Padua.

Other varieties include 'Tardivo'; Treviso tardivo is considered the king of radicchio in Italy. It involves weeks of painstaking manual labor using a traditional forced growing and blanching method to produce the white ribs with red tops. After harvest, the heads are left in tanks of running resurgence water for two weeks. They are then cut, washed, and packaged. There are strict regulations on the length and appearance of the root left on the head. Radicchio tardivo is crunchy and bitter and is usually eaten cooked.

The di Castelfranco both resemble flowers, and Castelfranco is very different in appearance to the other radicchio types with creamy, light green leaves and deep red speckles. It has a sweeter flavour than the other varieties and is thought to have first been cultivated in the 800s, originating from crossing original radicchio plants with escarole. The IGP area covers 25 towns in the boroughs of Treviso, available only in the winter months, as well as 'Gorizia' (also known as "Rosa di Gorizia"), 'Trieste' (Cicoria zuccherina or Biondissim). Radicchio farmers of the Veneto have sought to have Protected Geographical Status applied to the names of some radicchio varieties, including 'Tardivo.'

== Culinary uses ==
In Italian cuisine, it is usually eaten grilled with olive oil or mixed into dishes such as risotto. It can also be served with pasta or be used in strudel, as a poultry stuffing, or as an ingredient for a tapenade.

As with all chicories, its roots, after roasting and grinding, can be used as a coffee substitute or coffee additive.

== Toxicity ==
According to folklore, long-term use of chicory as a coffee substitute may damage human retinal tissue, dimming vision over time and other long-term effects. Modern scientific literature contains little evidence to support or refute this claim. Root chicory contains volatile oils similar to those found in plants in the related genus Tanacetum, which includes tansy. All parts of the plant contain these volatile oils, with most of the toxic components concentrated in the plant's root.

Studies indicate that ingestion of chicory by farm animals results in a reduction of worm burdens, which has prompted its widespread use as a forage supplement.

== Cultivation ==
Radicchio is easy to grow but performs best in spring (USDA Zone 8 and above) and autumn gardens. It prefers more frequent but not deep watering, though the amount of water varies based on soil type. Infrequent watering will lead to a more bitter-tasting leaf. However, for autumn crops, the flavour is changed predominantly by the onset of cold weather (the colder, the mellower), which also initiates the heading and reddening process in traditional varieties. There are newer, self-heading varieties whose taste is not yet as good as a traditional variety which has matured through several frosts or freezes (e.g., Alouette). Radicchio matures in approximately three months. However, it can be made to stand through a British or West European winter, and the head will regenerate if cut off carefully above ground level, so long as the plant is protected against severe frost. A light-excluding cover (e.g., an inverted pot) may be used during the latter phases of growth to produce leaves with a more pronounced colour contrast, simultaneously protecting against frost and cold winds. Traditionally in the United Kingdom, the first cutting of chicory heads was thrown away, and the tender, forced, second head was for the table. However, improved varieties of radicchio (e.g., Rosso di Verona) and generally milder winters allow the West European cultivator to harvest two or more crops from a single planting.

== See also ==
- Belgian endive
