= Endive =

Leafy vegetable

Endive, raw
Nutritional value per 100 g (3.5 oz)
- Energy: 71 kJ (17 kcal)
- Carbohydrates: 3.35 g
- Dietary fiber: 3.1 g
- Fat: 0.2 g
- Protein: 1.25 g
Vitamins and minerals
Vitamins	Quantity %DV^{†}
Vitamin A equiv. beta-Carotene	12% 108 μg 12% 1300 μg
Thiamine (B1)	7% 0.08 mg
Riboflavin (B2)	6% 0.075 mg
Niacin (B3)	3% 0.4 mg
Pantothenic acid (B5)	18% 0.9 mg
Folate (B9)	36% 142 μg
Vitamin C	7% 6.5 mg
Vitamin E	3% 0.44 mg
Vitamin K	193% 231 μg
Minerals	Quantity %DV^{†}
Calcium	4% 52 mg
Iron	5% 0.83 mg
Magnesium	4% 15 mg
Manganese	18% 0.42 mg
Phosphorus	2% 28 mg
Potassium	10% 314 mg
Zinc	7% 0.79 mg
- Link to USDA Database entry
- ^{†}Percentages estimated using US recommendations for adults, except for potassium, which is estimated based on expert recommendation from the National Academies.

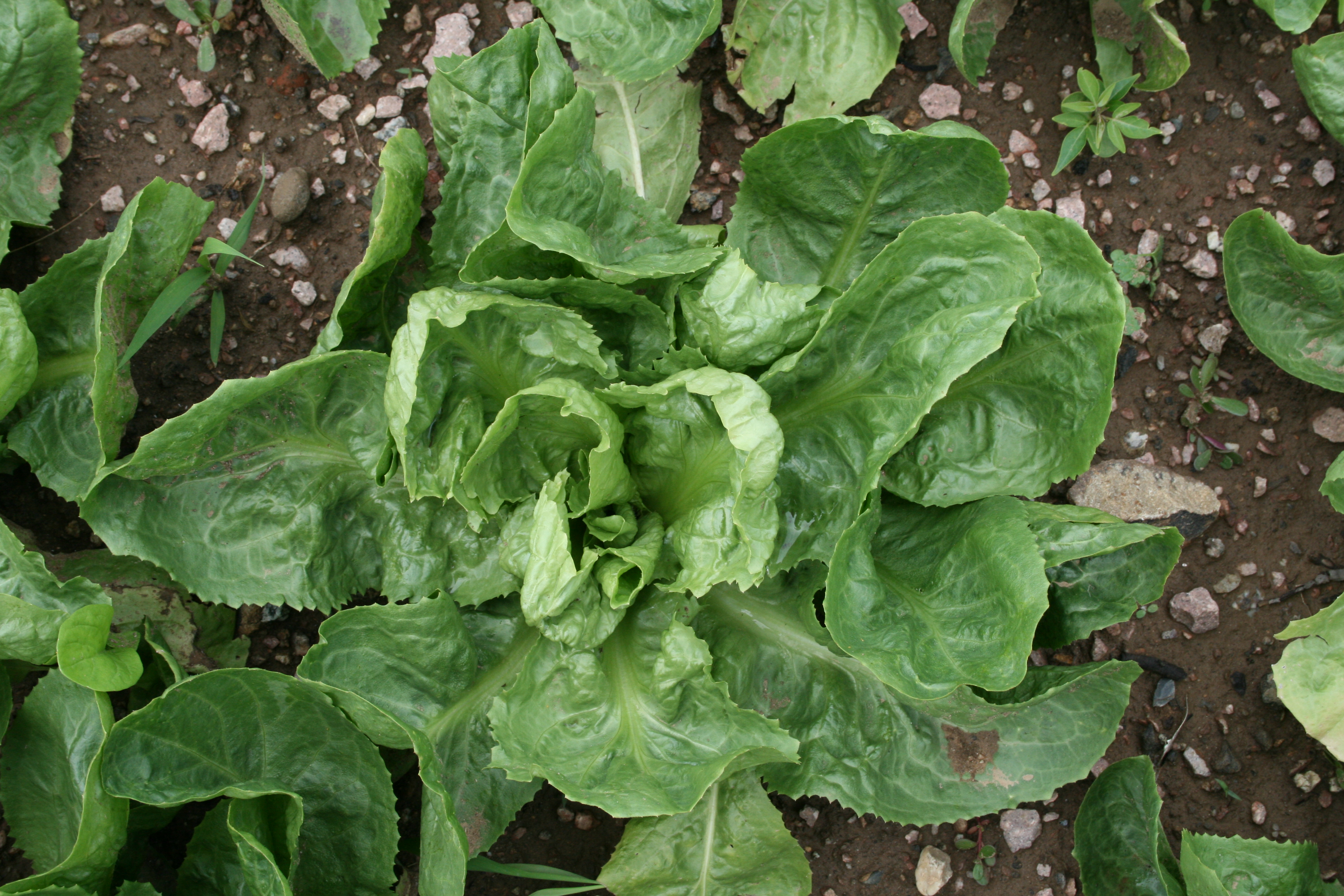
A broad-leaved endive cultivar of species Cichorium endivia

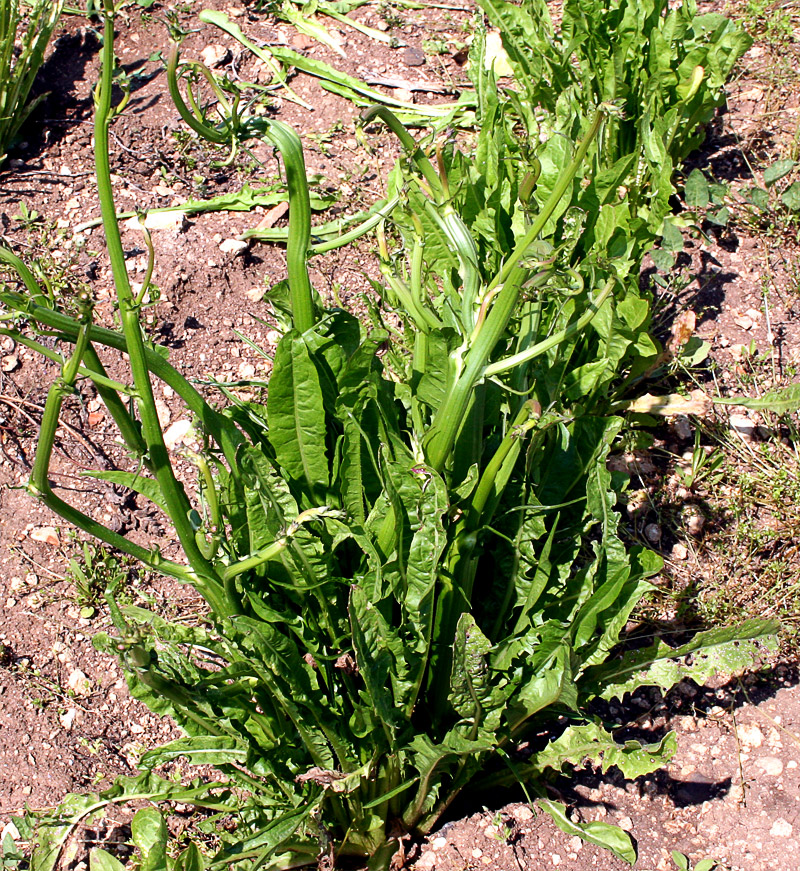
An heirloom endive cultivar of species Cichorium intybus

Endive (/ˈɛndaɪv, -dɪv, ˈɑːndiːv/) is a leaf vegetable belonging to the genus Cichorium, which includes several similar bitter-leafed vegetables. Species include Cichorium endivia (also called endive), Cichorium pumilum (also called wild endive), and Cichorium intybus (also called chicory). Chicory includes types such as radicchio, puntarelle, and Belgian endive.

There is considerable confusion between Cichorium endivia and Cichorium intybus.

== Cichorium endivia ==
There are two main varieties of cultivated C. endivia chicon:

- Curly endive, or frisée (var. crispum). This type has narrow, green, curly outer leaves. It is sometimes called chicory in the United States and is called chicorée frisée in French. Further confusion results from the fact that frisée also refers to greens lightly wilted with oil.
- Escarole, or broad-leaved endive (var. latifolia), has broad, pale green leaves and is less bitter than the other varieties. Varieties or names include broad-leaved Batavian endive, grumolo, scarola, and scarole. It is eaten like other greens, sautéed, chopped into soups and stews, or as part of a green salad. In parts of Southern Italy, escarole is commonly cooked through smothering, and at Christmas in Naples is eaten stuffed with raisins, pine nuts, olives, capers, cheese and breadcrumbs.
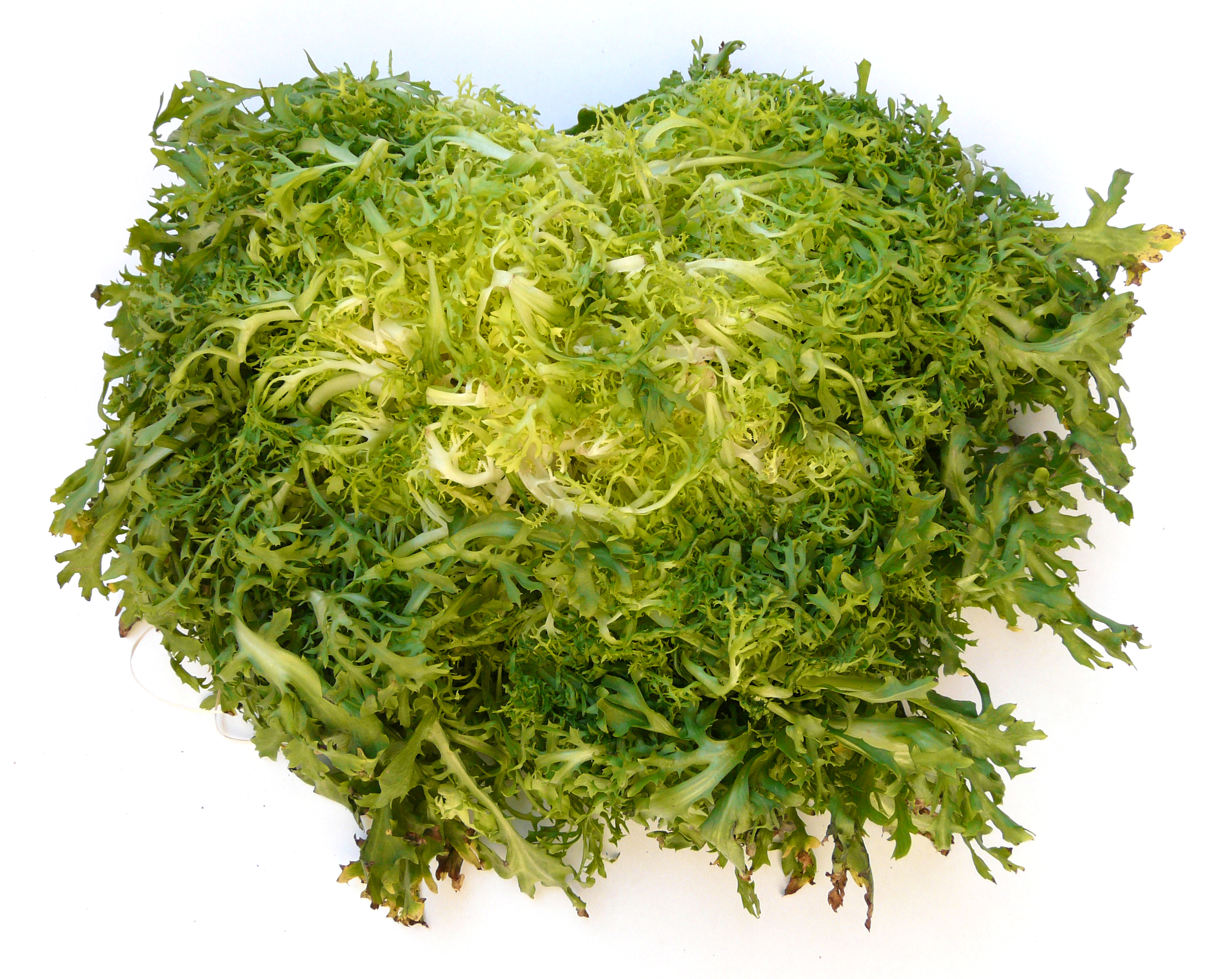
Frisée

== Cichorium intybus ==
Cichorium intybus endive is popular in Europe, and is also known as leaf chicory.

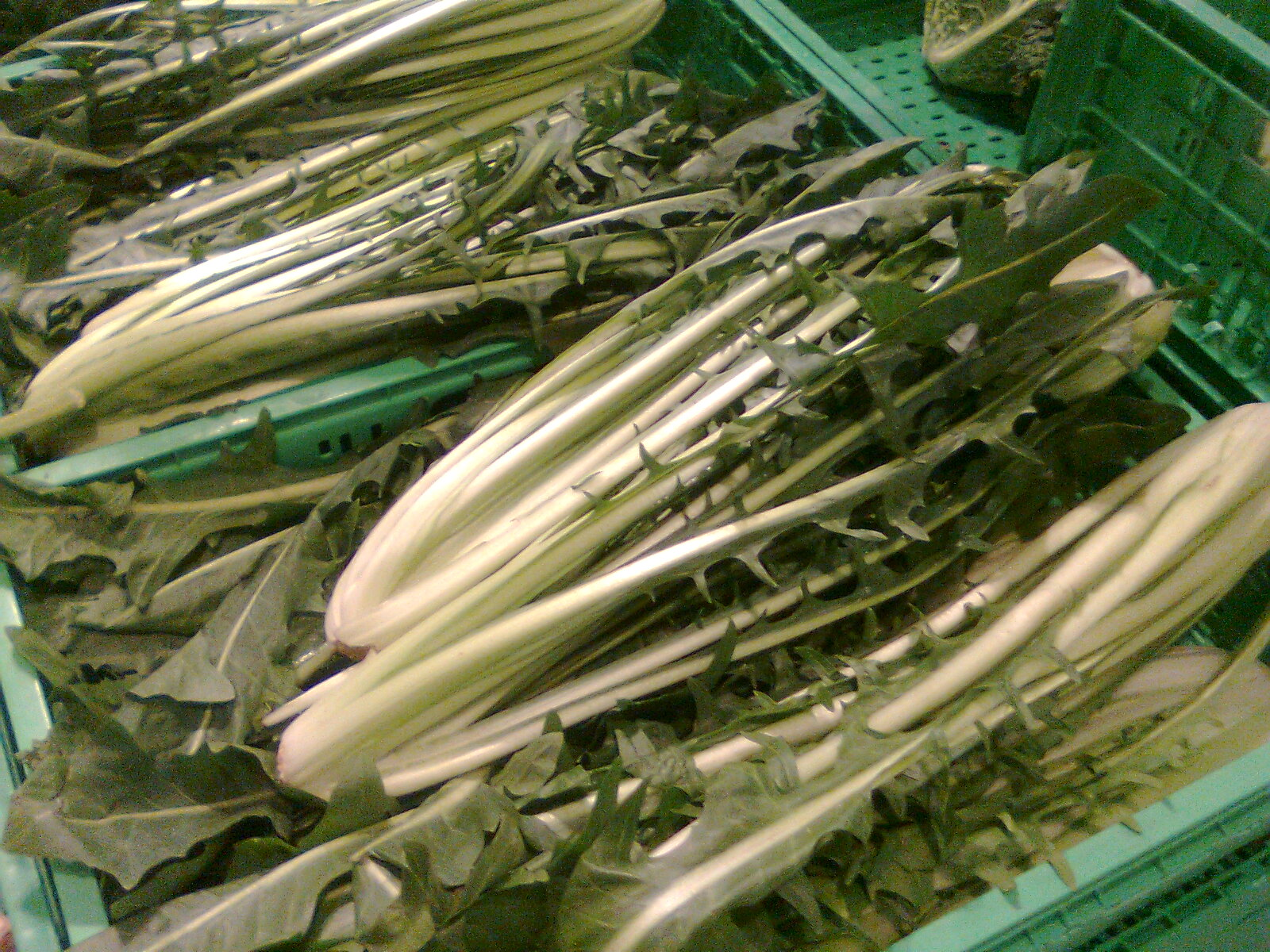
Catalogna, also called asparagus endive

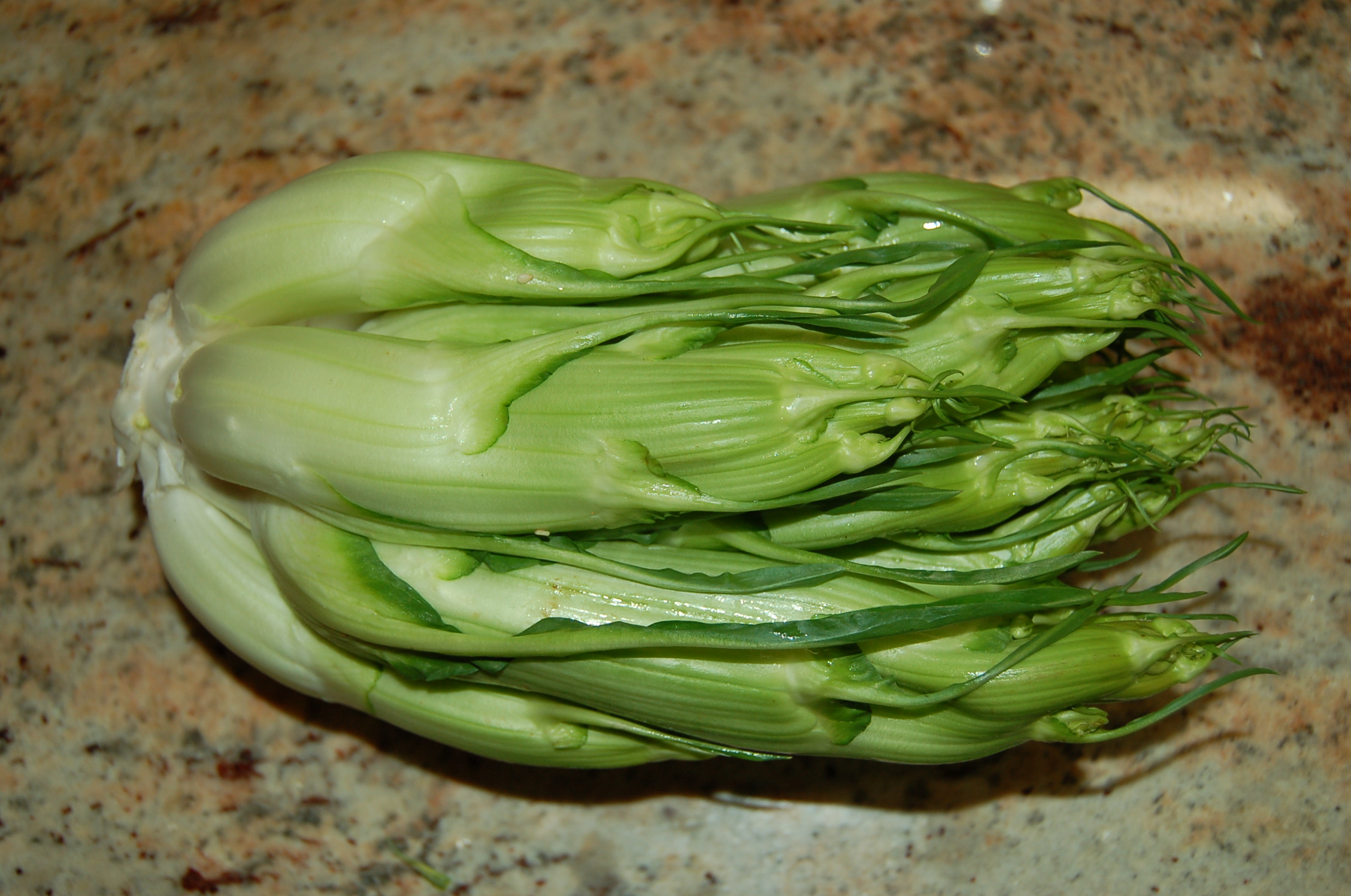
Puntarelle, the prized central stalks of the Catalogna endive

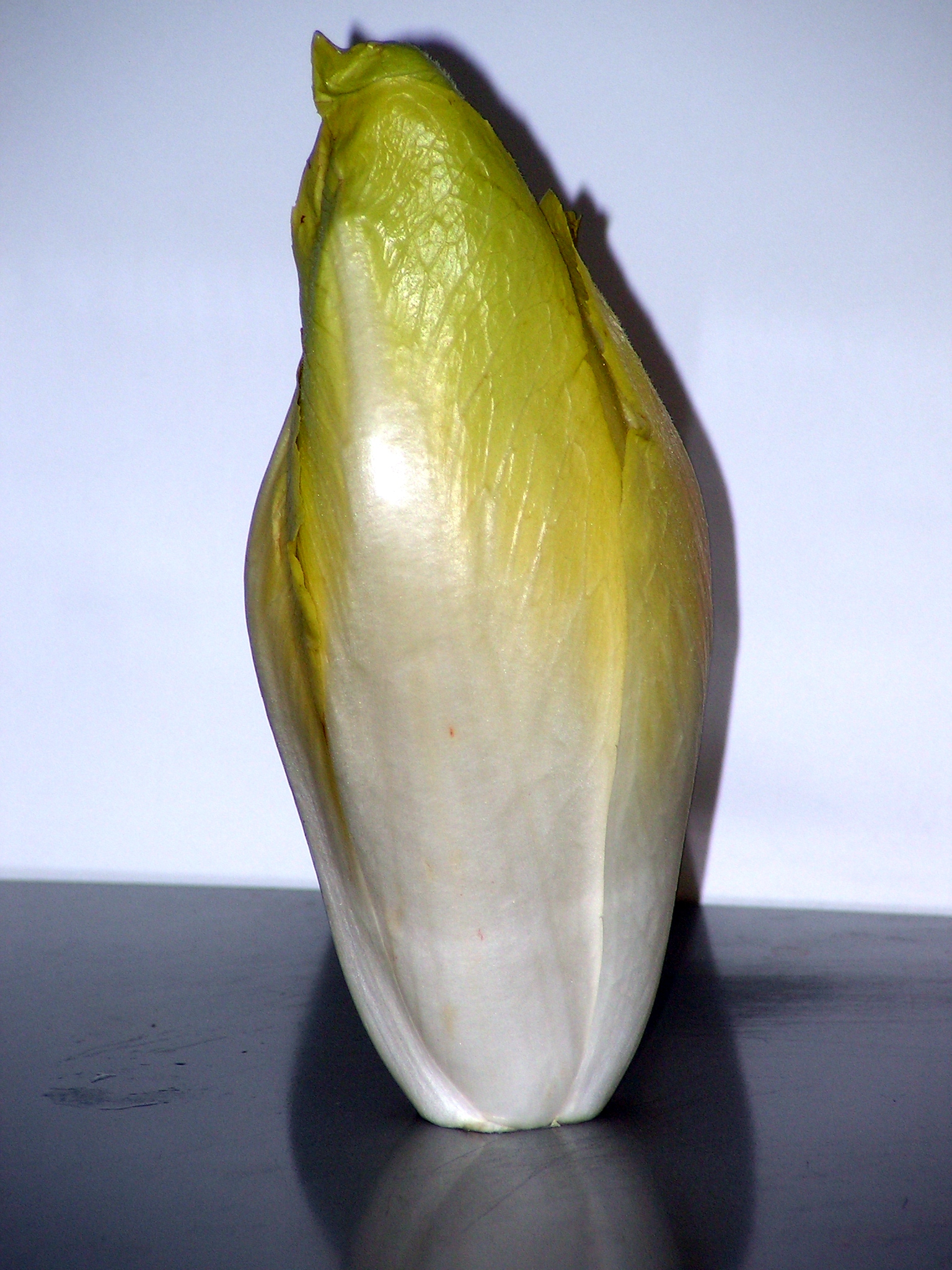
Belgian endive

== Chemical constituents ==
Endive is rich in many vitamins and minerals, especially in folate and vitamins A and K, and is high in fiber. It also contains kaempferol.
