= Rice and gravy =

Rice dish from American cuisine

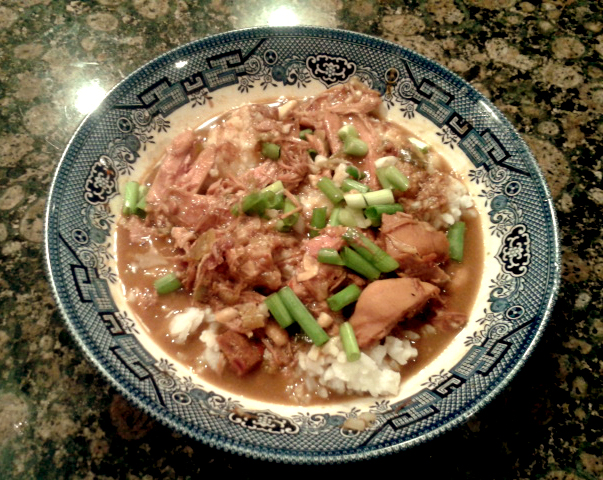
- Smothered turkey with rice and gravy
- Place of origin: United States
- Region or state: Louisiana
- Main ingredients: Meats, brown gravy, rice

Rice and gravy (French: du riz et de la sauce) is a staple of Louisiana Creole and Cajun cuisine, made by deglazing a pan to make brown gravy, simmering with extra seasonings, and serving over steamed or boiled rice.

== Preparation ==
Rice has been a major agricultural export crop in southwest Louisiana since the late 1800s and has become a staple of local cuisine in dishes such as boudin, gumbo and étouffée. Rice and gravy is traditionally made from cheaper cuts of meat and cooked in a cast iron pot for a long time in order to let the tough cuts of meat become tender. Beef, pork, chicken or any other meat can be used in its preparation. Fattier cuts of beef and pork, as well as chicken, squirrel, rabbit, turkey necks, wild pig, and duck lend themselves more easily to the making of the gravy, while venison and leaner cuts of beef and pork are more difficult to make tender, but can be helped by adding andouille sausage or cured pork tasso to the dish during the browning or smothering process. Often the meat is cooked with the Cajun holy trinity, a mirepoix variant of onions, bell peppers, and celery in roughly equal quantities, although other vegetables can also be used.

Originally a dish favored by farmers and laborers, it is now often served in local plate lunch houses. Raised on Rice and Gravy, a 2009 documentary film by Conni Castille and Allison Bohl, chronicles the prevalence of the dish at local plate lunch houses and its enduring popularity in Acadiana cuisine. Abbeville native Bobby Charles' Rice 'N' Gravy Records is named for the popular dish. Acadian Village in Lafayette is home to the annual "Rice and Gravy Cook-Off" sponsored by the Louisiana Beef Council.

== Gallery ==
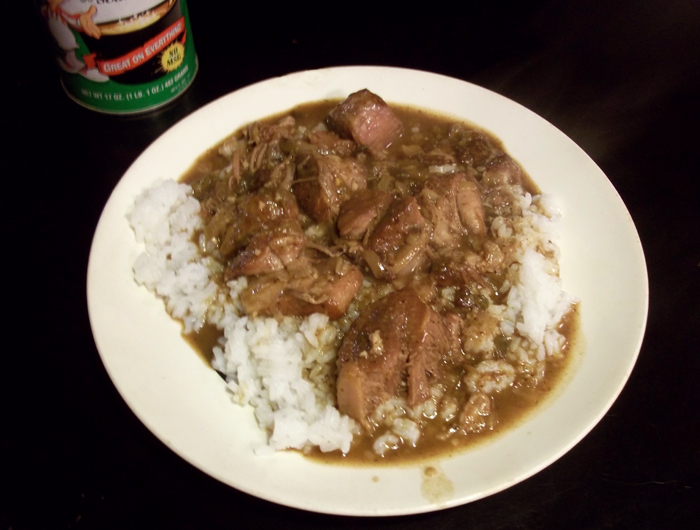
Smothered pork roast rice and gravy

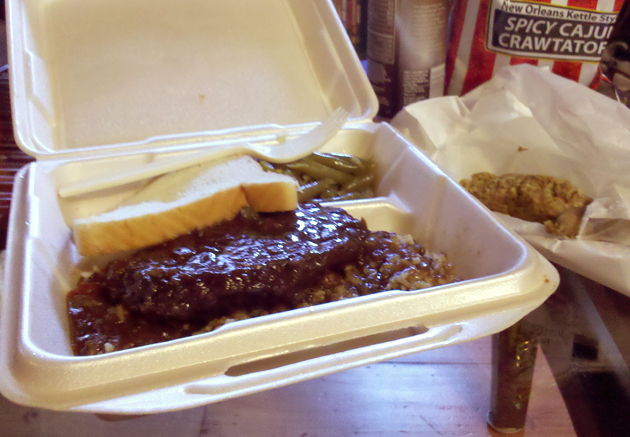
Hamburger steak with rice and gravy plate lunch

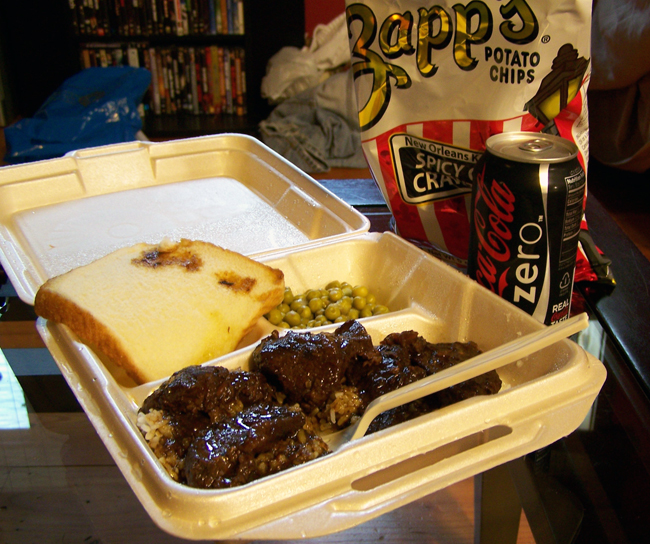
Smothered steak rice and gravy plate lunch

== See also ==
- Dirty rice
- Red beans and rice
