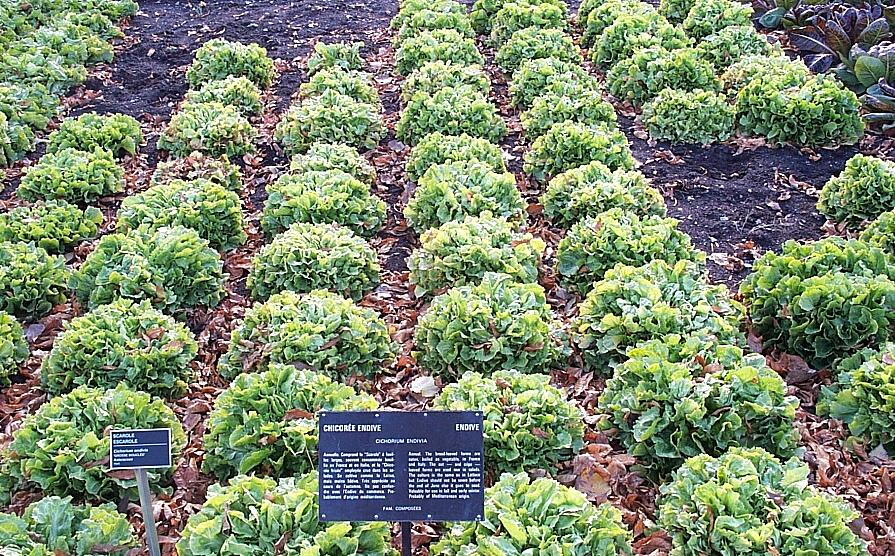
- Escarole endive

Scientific classification
- Kingdom: Plantae
- Clade: Tracheophytes
- Clade: Angiosperms
- Clade: Eudicots
- Clade: Asterids
- Order: Asterales
- Family: Asteraceae
- Genus: Cichorium
- Species: C. endivia

Binomial name
- Cichorium endivia L.

Synonyms
- Cichorium casnia Wall.; Cichorium casnia C.B.Clarke; Cichorium crispum Mill. nom. illeg.; Cichorium esculentum Salisb.

= Cichorium endivia =

Species of flowering plant

Cichorium endivia is a species of flowering plant belonging to the genus Cichorium. It is widely cultivated as one of the species of similar bitter-leafed vegetables known as endive and escarole.

There is considerable confusion between the species and C. intybus (common chicory).

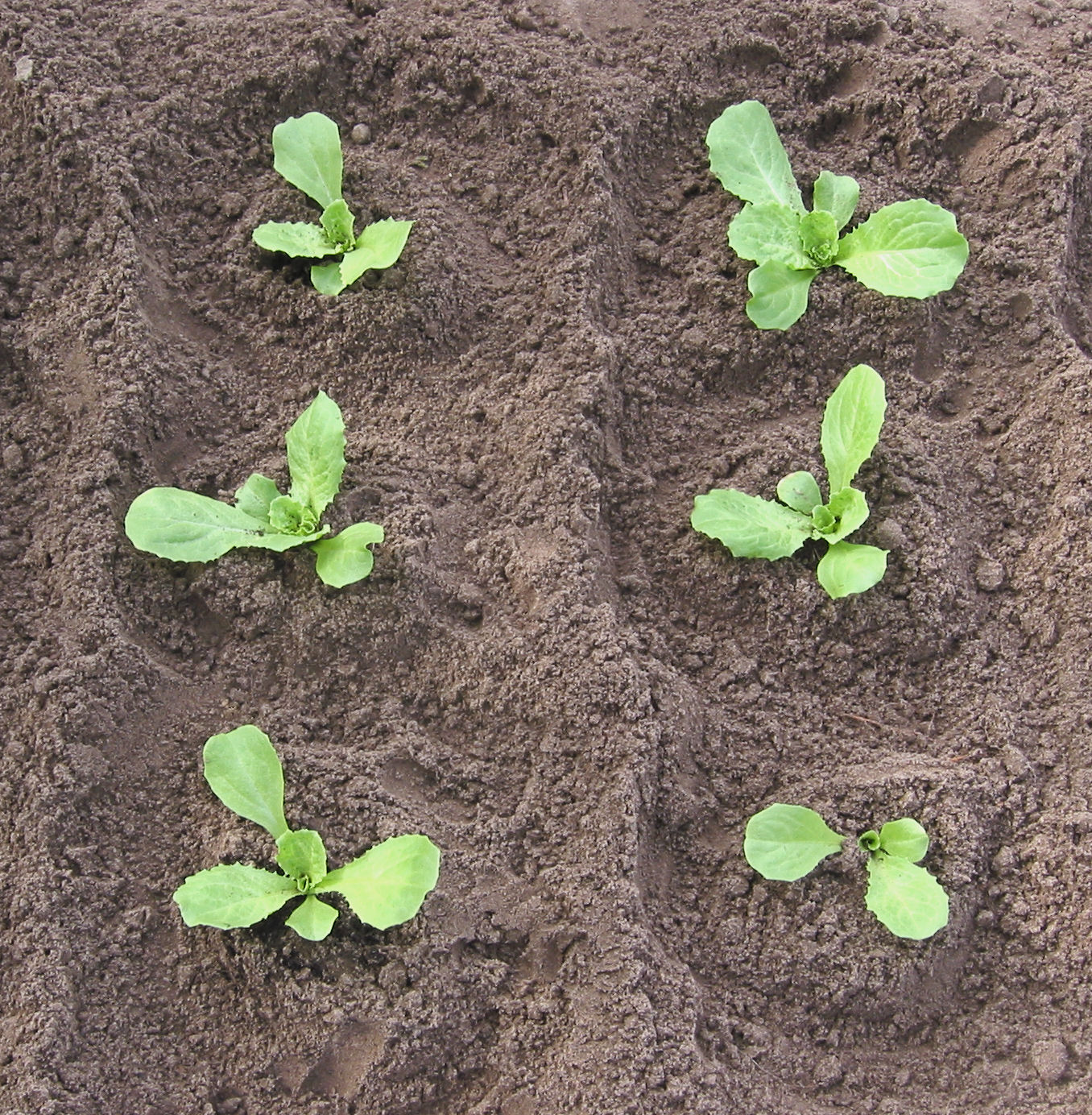
Seedlings

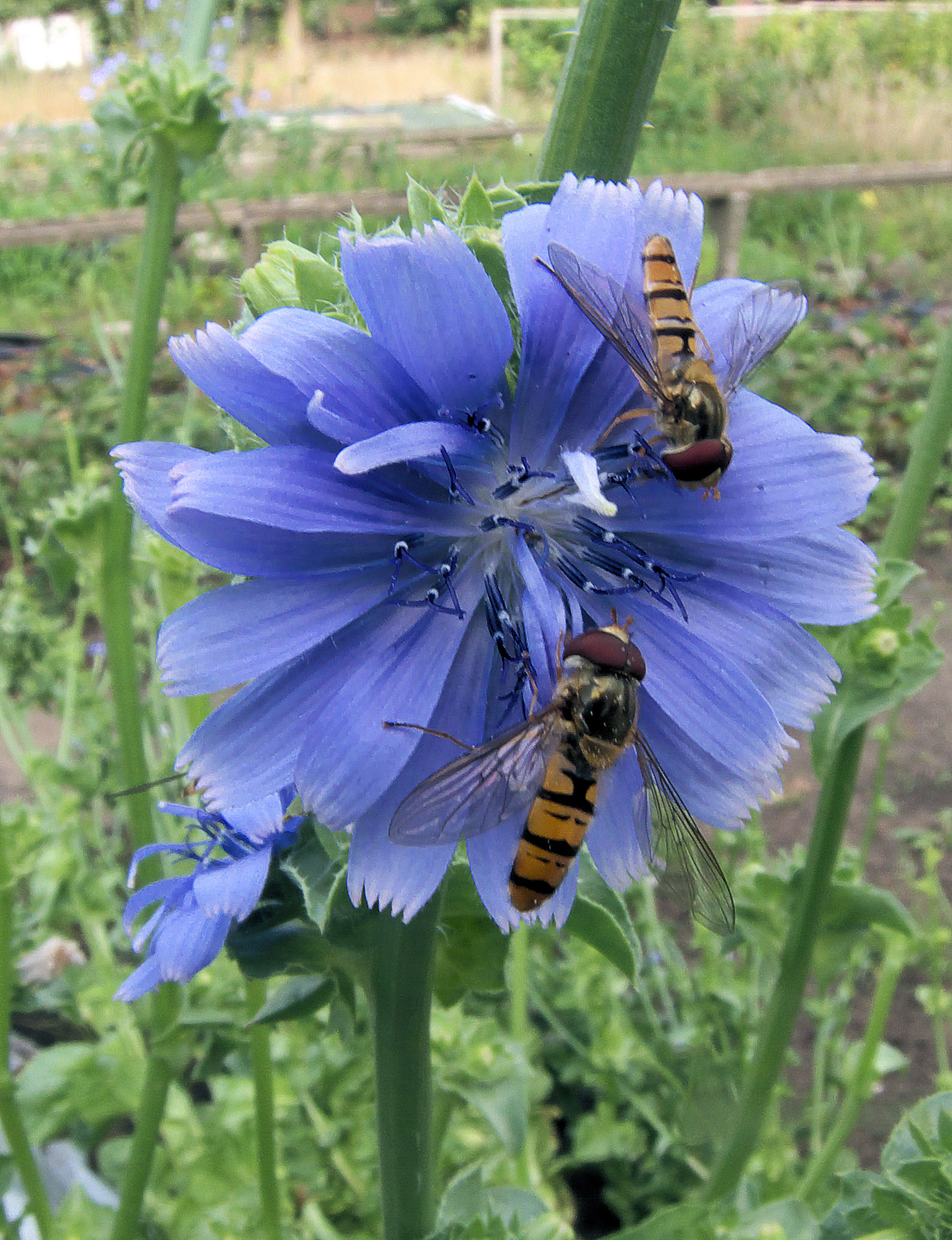
Flower with hoverflies

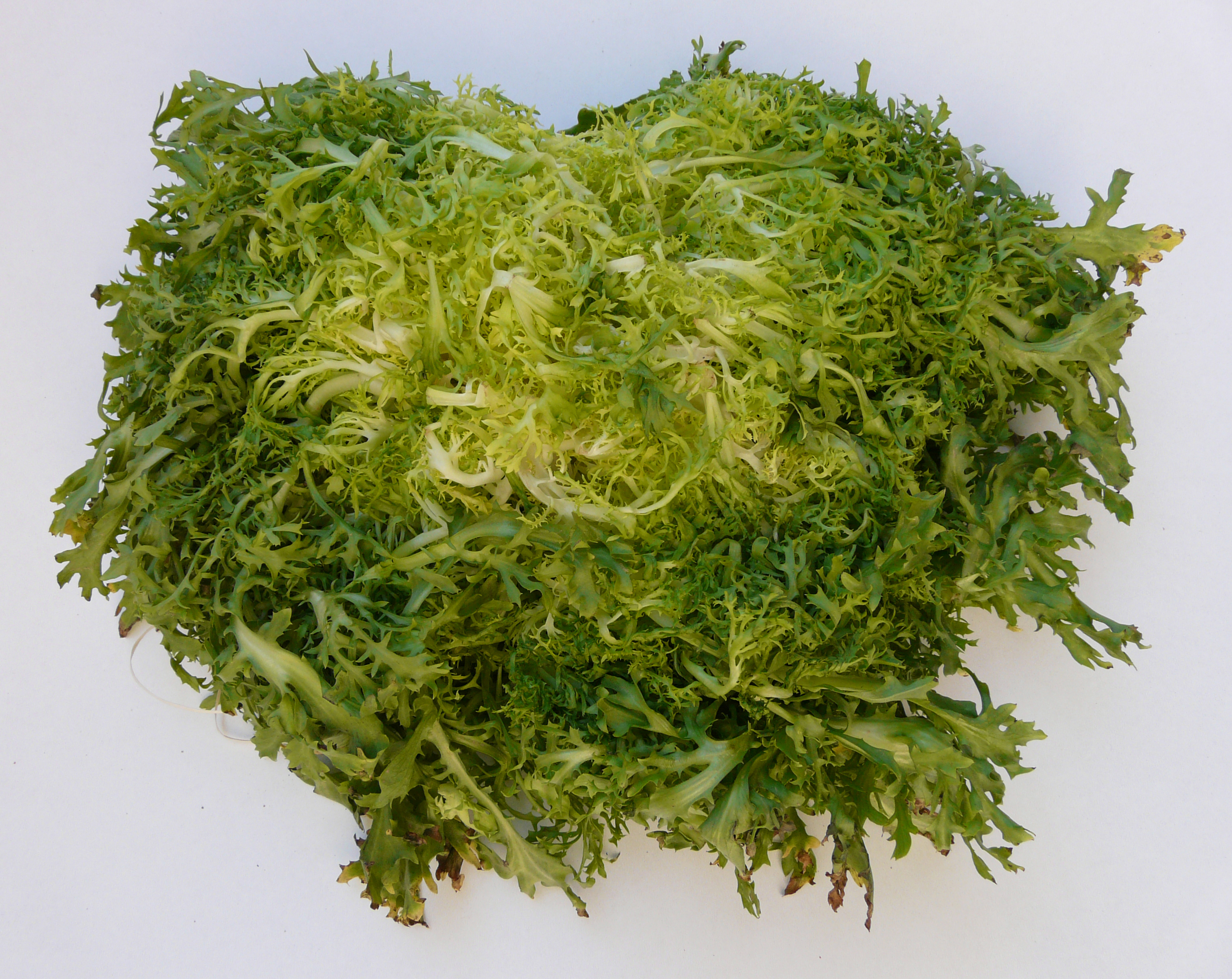
A variant sometimes known as "frisée"
