= Smothering (cooking) =

Cooking technique

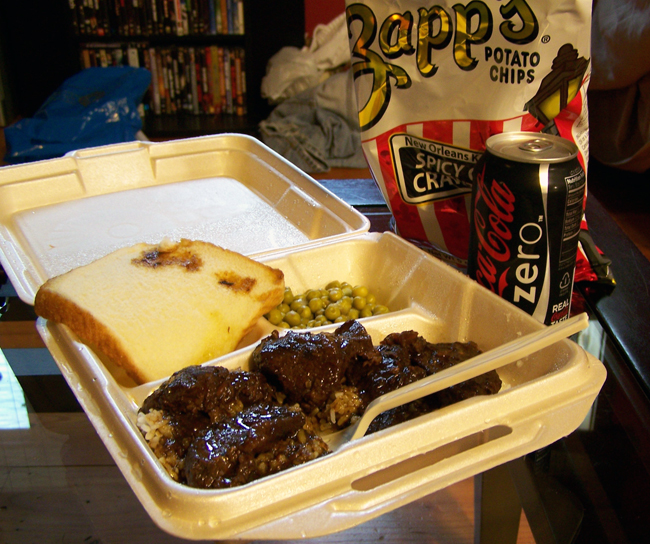
A plate lunch of smothered steak and gravy served over boiled white rice from Garys Grocery in Lafayette, Louisiana

Smothering meat, seafood or vegetables is a cooking technique used in both Cajun and Creole cuisines of Louisiana. The technique involves cooking in a covered pan over low heat with a moderate amount of liquid, and can be regarded as a form of stove-top braising. The meat dishes cooked in this fashion are typically served over boiled or steamed white rice as a rice and gravy, while the vegetables are typically served as side dishes.

== Description ==
This method of food preparation involves using the Maillard reaction to "brown" the featured meat or vegetables and usually the aromatic "trinity" as well, then deglazing with stock or water and simmering the mixture over low heat for an extended period of time. It is often done in a cast-iron pot or Dutch oven, so the heat can be evenly applied and distributed.

=== Meat ===
A large variety of meats are "smothered" in South Louisiana cuisine, including both domestic animals and wild game. Domestic animals cooked in this fashion include chicken, domestic duck, pork, beef (including such organs as the liver), and domestic rabbit. Wild game commonly cooked in this fashion includes squirrel, rabbit, nutria rat, feral pig, woodcock, wild duck, and venison. Originally a dish made from cheap cuts of meat favored by farmers and laborers, popular versions of the dish such as "smothered steak" and "smothered pork roast" are served throughout Acadiana at local "plate lunch houses". Raised on Rice and Gravy, a 2009 documentary film by Conni Castille and Allison Bohl, chronicles the prevalence of the dish at local plate lunch houses and its enduring popularity in local cuisine.

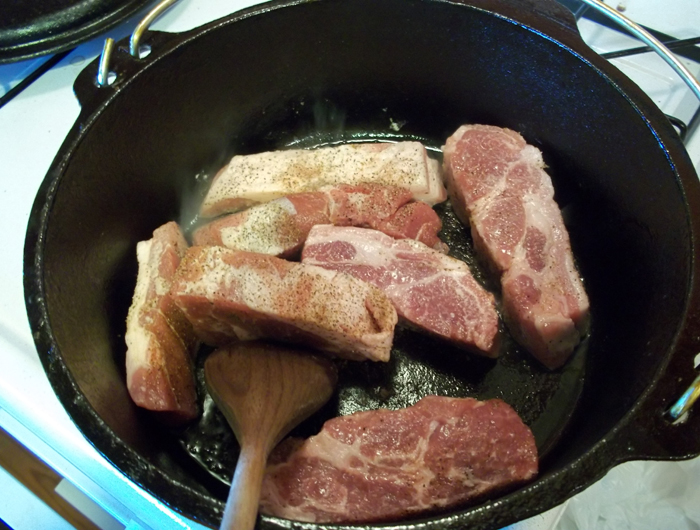
Browning the meat in a cast-iron pot

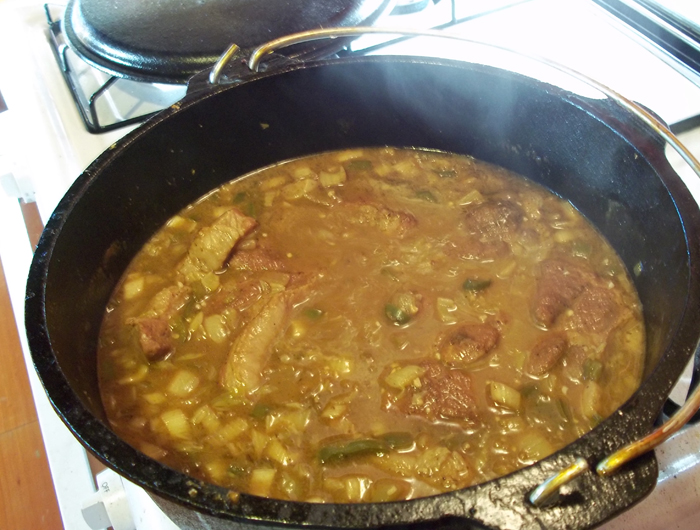
"Smothering" the meat and vegetables

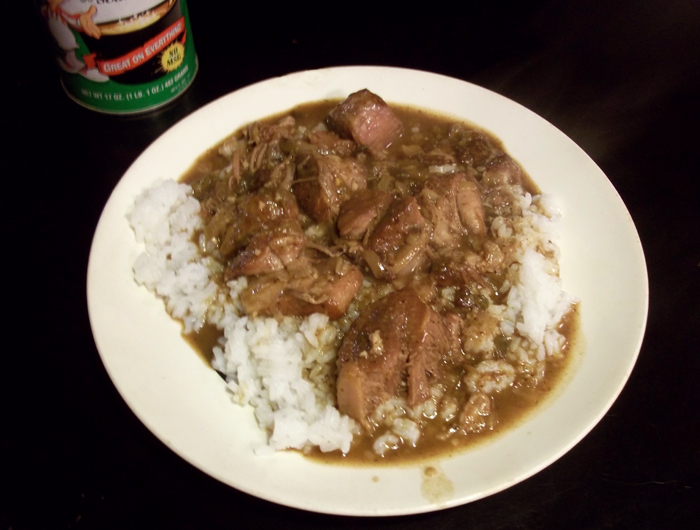
Finished dish plated with rice

=== Shellfish ===
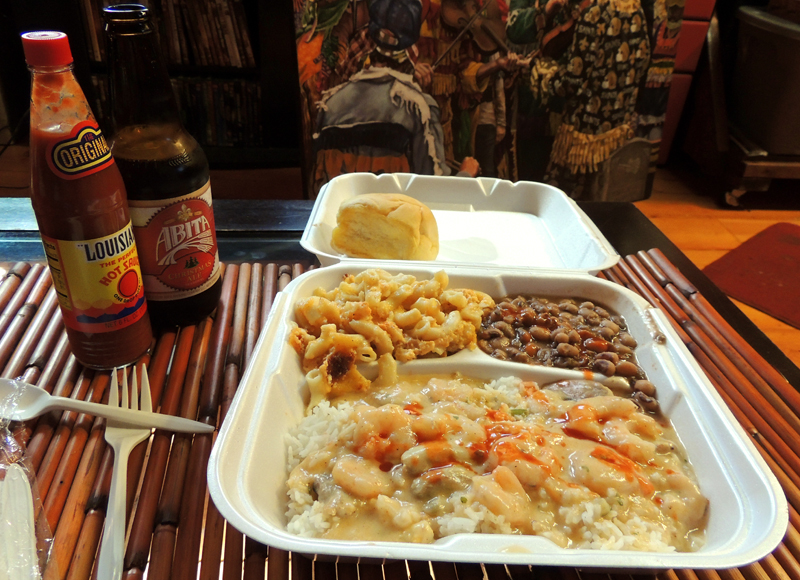
Shrimp and crab étouffée plate lunch from Dwyers Cafe in Lafayette

In French, the word "étouffée" means "smothered". Étouffée can be made using different shellfish, the most popular version of the dish being crawfish étouffée, although shrimp is also used. Originally étouffée was a popular dish in the Acadiana area surrounding Lafayette. In the late twentieth century, a waiter at the popular Bourbon Street restaurant Galatoire's brought the dish in to his employer to try and the dish was added to their menu. Other restaurants in the city of New Orleans soon followed, with the dish gaining in popularity with locals and tourists alike. Many Cajun restaurant owners claim that étouffée is the most popular dish on their menus.

=== Vegetables ===
Varieties of vegetables cooked by smothering include cabbage, okra, potatoes and corn. The vegetables are kept from burning by the addition of animal fats or oils, or the addition of meat products such as salt pork or andouille.
