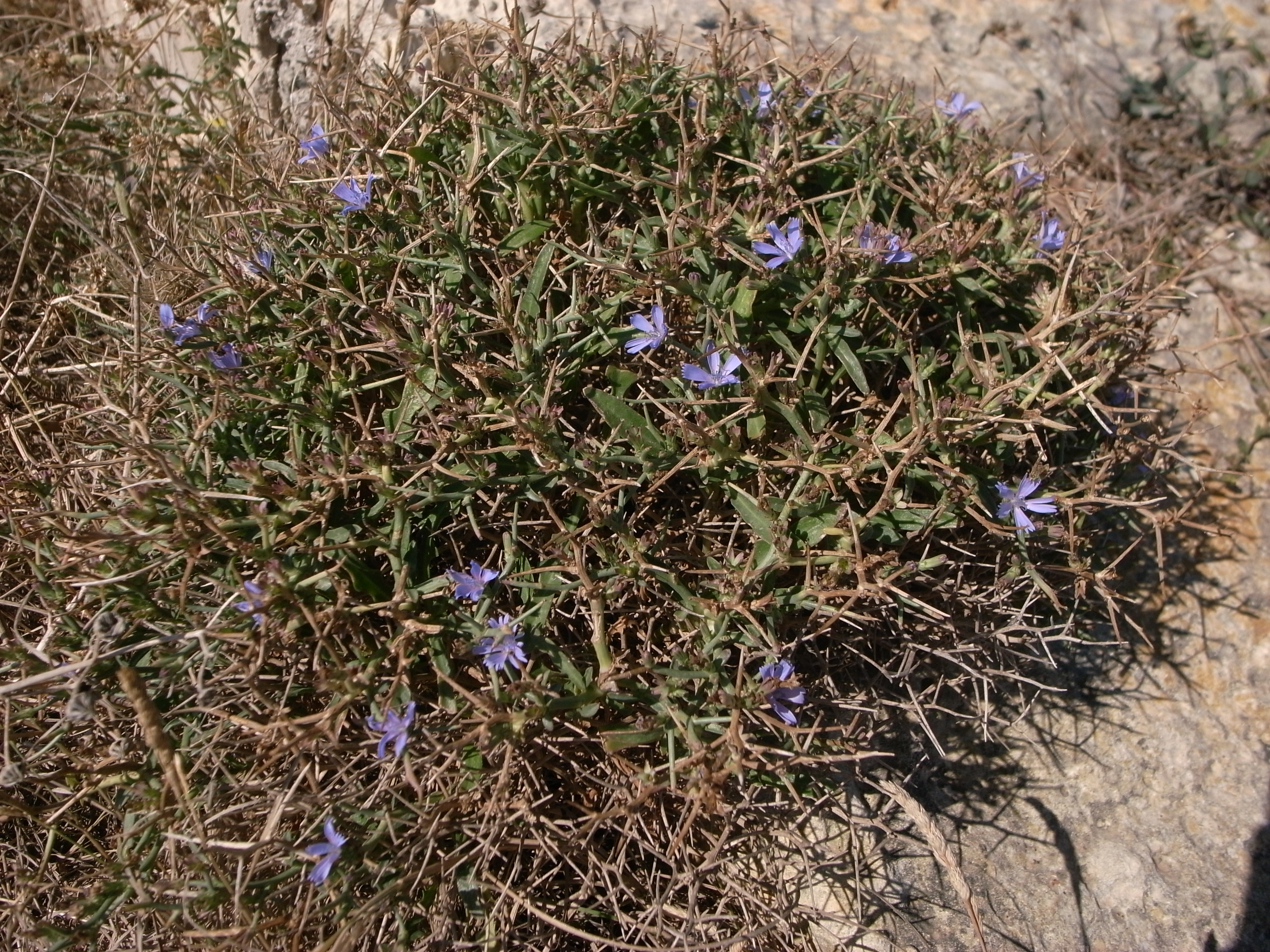
- On Malta
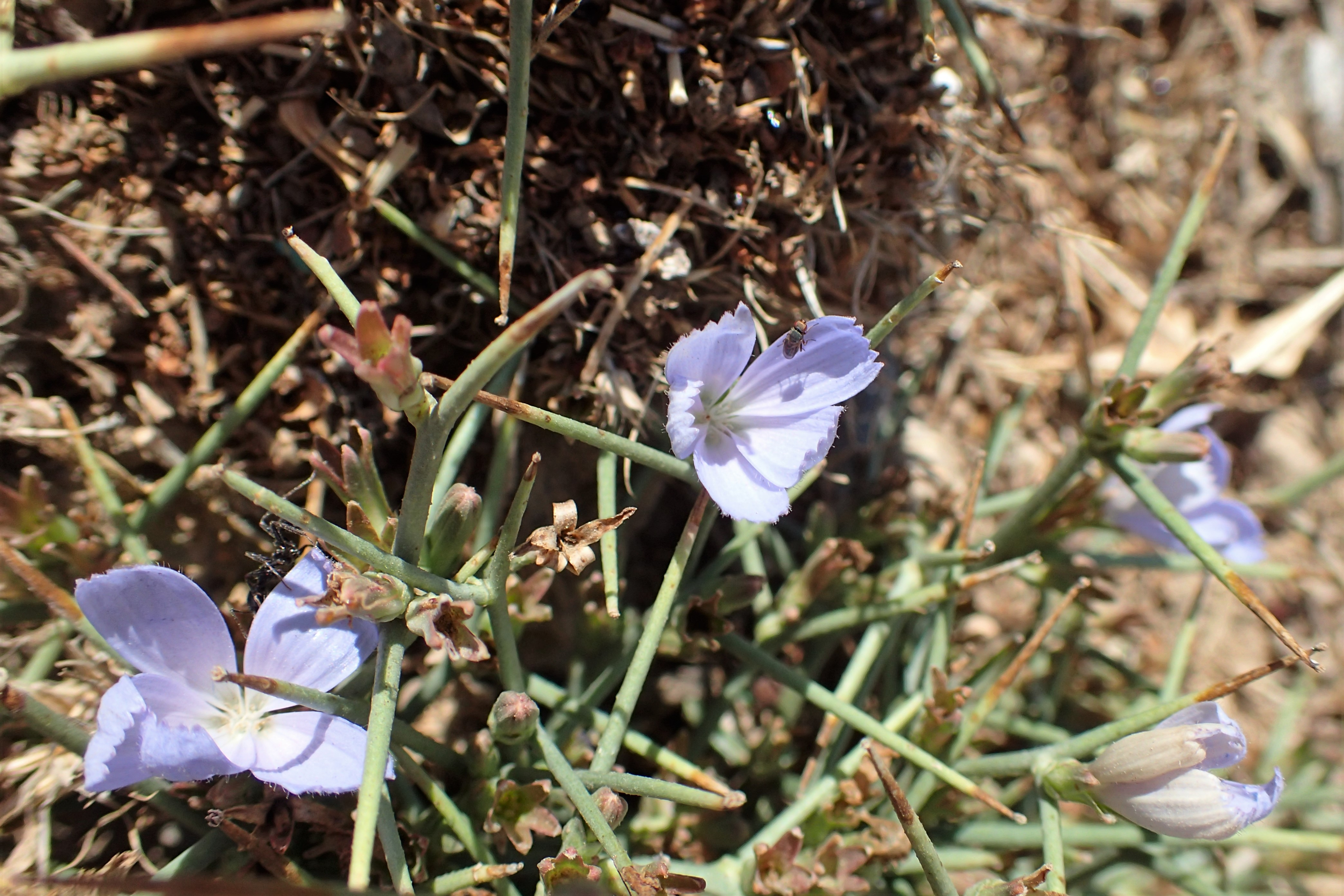
- Close-up of flowers

Scientific classification
- Kingdom: Plantae
- Clade: Tracheophytes
- Clade: Angiosperms
- Clade: Eudicots
- Clade: Asterids
- Order: Asterales
- Family: Asteraceae
- Genus: Cichorium
- Species: C. spinosum

Binomial name
- Cichorium spinosum L.

Synonyms
- Acanthophyton spinosum Less.

= Cichorium spinosum =

Species of flowering plant

Cichorium spinosum, the spiny chicory, is a species of flowering plant in the family Asteraceae, native to the Mediterranean region. A biennial or perennial reaching 20 cm (8 in), is both collected in the wild and cultivated as a leafy green vegetable.
