= Cichorium bottae =

Scientific classification
- Kingdom: Plantae
- Clade: Embryophytes
- Clade: Tracheophytes
- Clade: Angiosperms
- Clade: Eudicots
- Clade: Asterids
- Order: Asterales
- Family: Asteraceae
- Genus: Cichorium
- Species: C. bottae

Binomial name
- Cichorium bottae Deflers

Species of flowering plant

Cichorium bottae is a flower in the chicory family. It is native to Saudi Arabia and Yemen.
