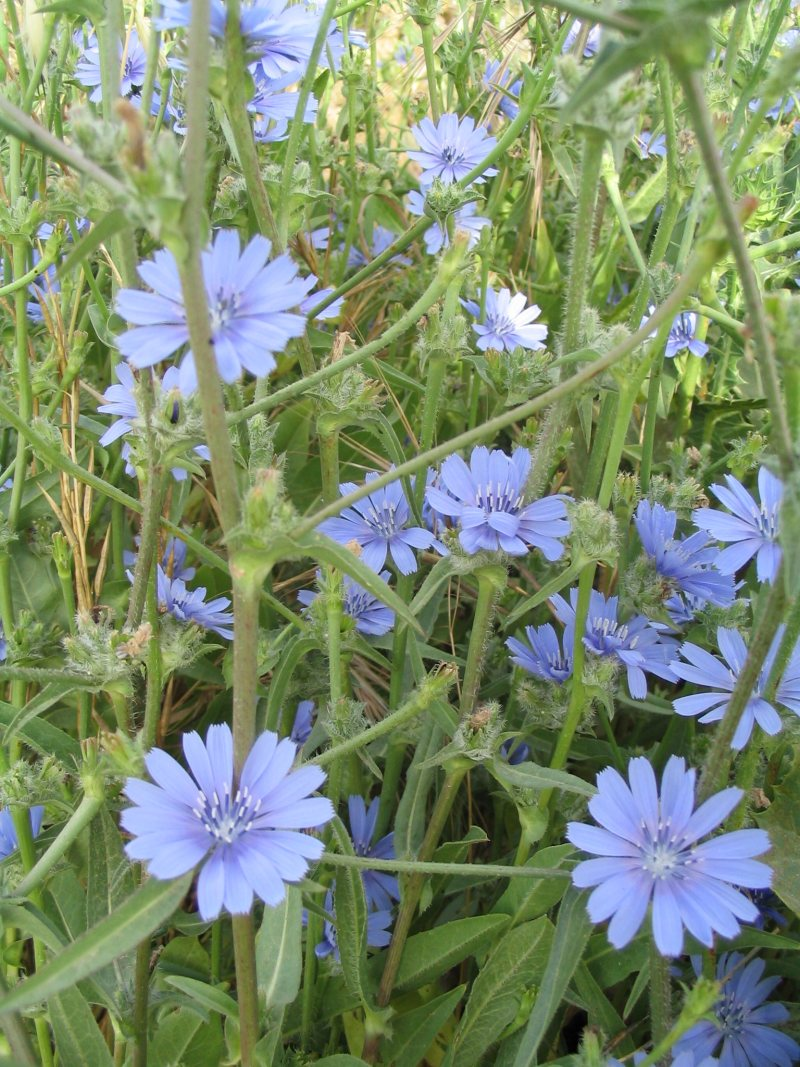
- Wild endive (Cichorium pumilum)

Scientific classification
- Kingdom: Plantae
- Clade: Embryophytes
- Clade: Tracheophytes
- Clade: Angiosperms
- Clade: Eudicots
- Clade: Asterids
- Order: Asterales
- Family: Asteraceae
- Subfamily: Cichorioideae
- Tribe: Cichorieae
- Subtribe: Cichoriinae
- Genus: Cichorium; L.

Type species
- Cichorium intybus L.

Synonyms
- Acanthophyton Less.; Endivia Hill

= Cichorium =

Genus of flowering plants in the daisy family

Cichorium is a genus of plants in the tribe Cichorieae within the family Asteraceae. The genus includes two cultivated species commonly known as chicory or endive, plus several wild species.

Common chicory (Cichorium intybus) is a bushy perennial herb with blue or lavender (or, rarely, white or pink) flowers. It grows as a wild plant on roadsides in its native Europe, and in North America, where it has become naturalized. It is grown for its leaves, when it is known as leaf chicory, endive, radicchio, Belgian endive, French endive, or witloof. Other varieties are grown for their roots, which are used as a coffee substitute, similar to dandelion coffee.

True endive (Cichorium endivia) is a species grown and used as a salad green. It has a slightly bitter taste. Curly endive and the broad-leafed escarole are true endives.

Cichorium is used as a food plant by the larvae of some Lepidoptera species including setaceous Hebrew character, turnip moth, and the grass moth Diasemia reticularis.

Species

- Cichorium bottae Deflers – Saudi Arabia, Yemen
- Cichorium calvum Sch.Bip. ex Asch. – Ethiopia
- Cichorium endivia L. – Egypt, Israel
- Cichorium glandulosum Boiss. & A.Huet – Turkey
- Cichorium intybus L. – Europe
- Cichorium pumilum Jacq. – Mediterranean
- Cichorium spinosum L. – Mediterranean

Formerly included are several species now considered better suited to other genera: Aposeris, Arnoseris, Geigeria, Rhagadiolus and Tolpis.

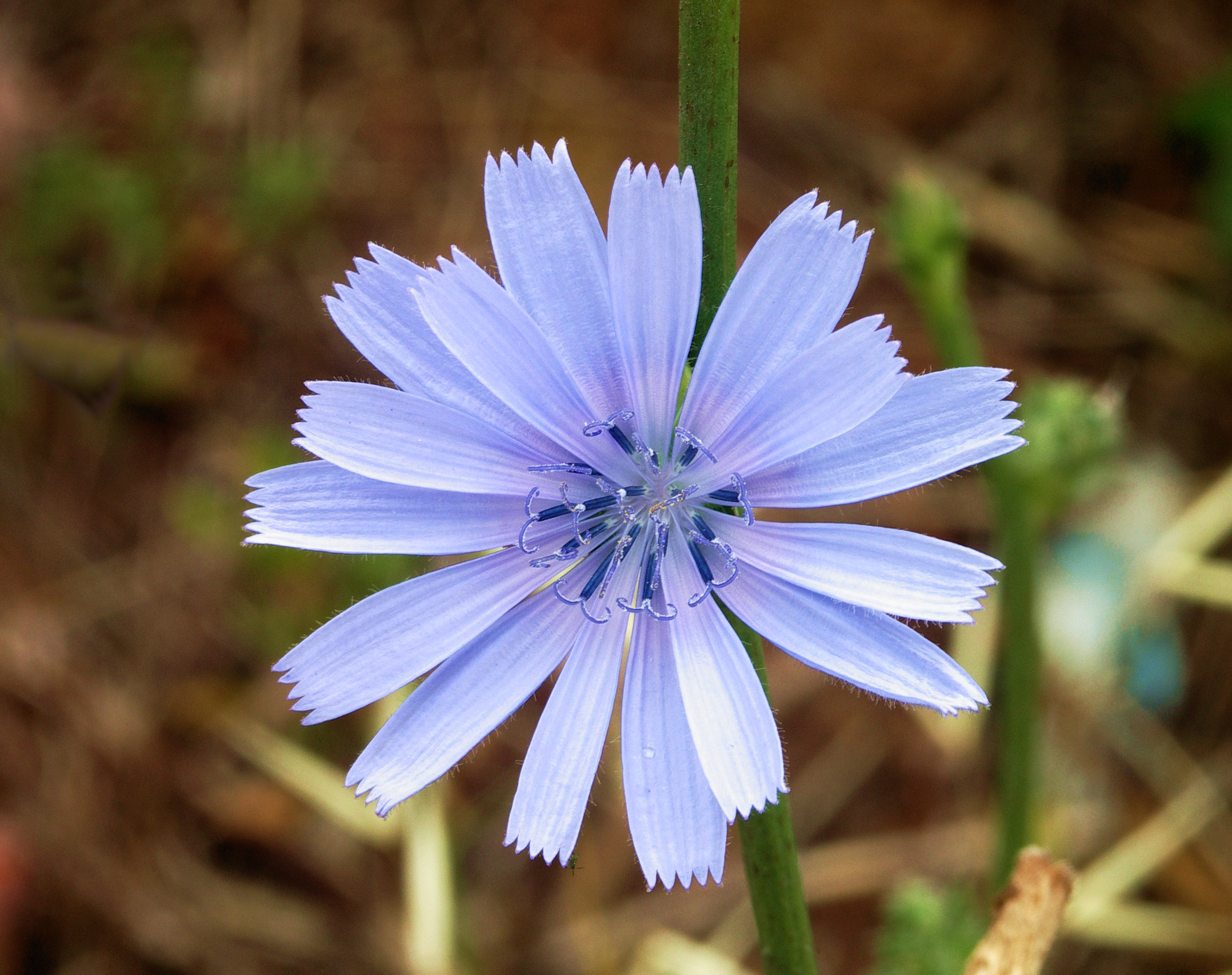
Flower of common chicory (Cichorium intybus)
