= Cajun cuisine =

Franco-American food developed by the Cajun people

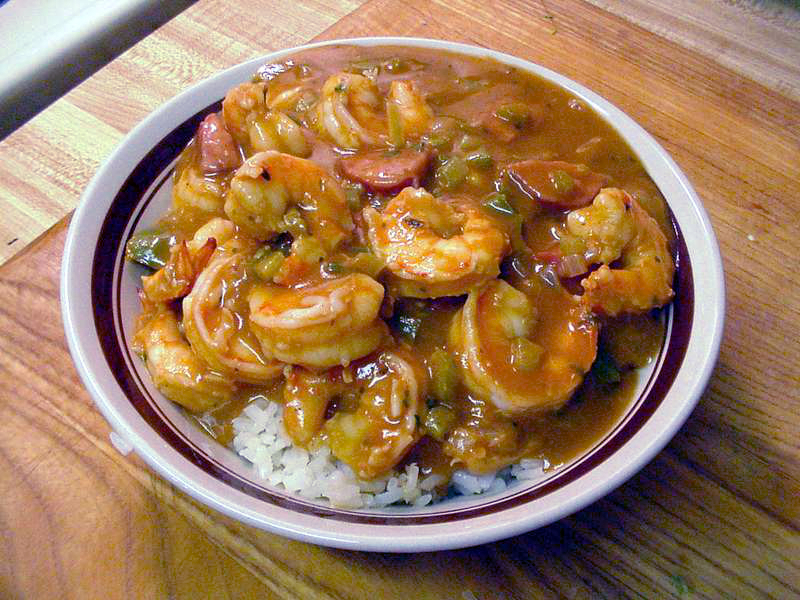
Gumbo, the state dish of Louisiana, prepared with seafood in a Cajun style.

Cajun cuisine (French: cuisine cadienne [kɥi.zin ka.dʒɛn], Spanish: cocina cadiense) is a subset of Louisiana cooking developed by the Cajuns, itself a Louisianan development incorporating elements of Native American, West African, French, and Spanish cuisine.

Cajun cuisine is often referred to as a "rustic" cuisine, meaning that it is based on locally available ingredients and that preparation is simple. Cajuns historically cooked their dishes, gumbo for example, in one pot.

Crawfish, shrimp, and andouille sausage are staple meats used in a variety of dishes. The aromatic vegetables green bell pepper (piment doux), onion, and celery are called "the trinity" by chefs in Cajun and Louisiana Creole cuisines. Roughly diced and combined in cooking, the method is similar to the use of the mirepoix in traditional French cuisine which blends roughly diced carrot, onion, and celery. Additional characteristic aromatics for both the Creole and Cajun versions may include parsley, bay leaf, thyme, green onions, ground cayenne pepper, and ground black pepper. Cayenne and Louisiana-style hot sauce are the primary sources of spice in Cajun cuisine, which usually tends towards a milder, well-balanced heat, despite the national "Cajun hot" craze of the 1980s and 1990s.

== History ==
The Acadians are an ethnic group descended from French colonists who settled in what is today Eastern Canada in the early 17th century. In the mid-18th century, thousands were deported by the British during the French and Indian War in what they termed le Grand Dérangement, and many of them resettled in southern Louisiana where they are known as Cajuns.

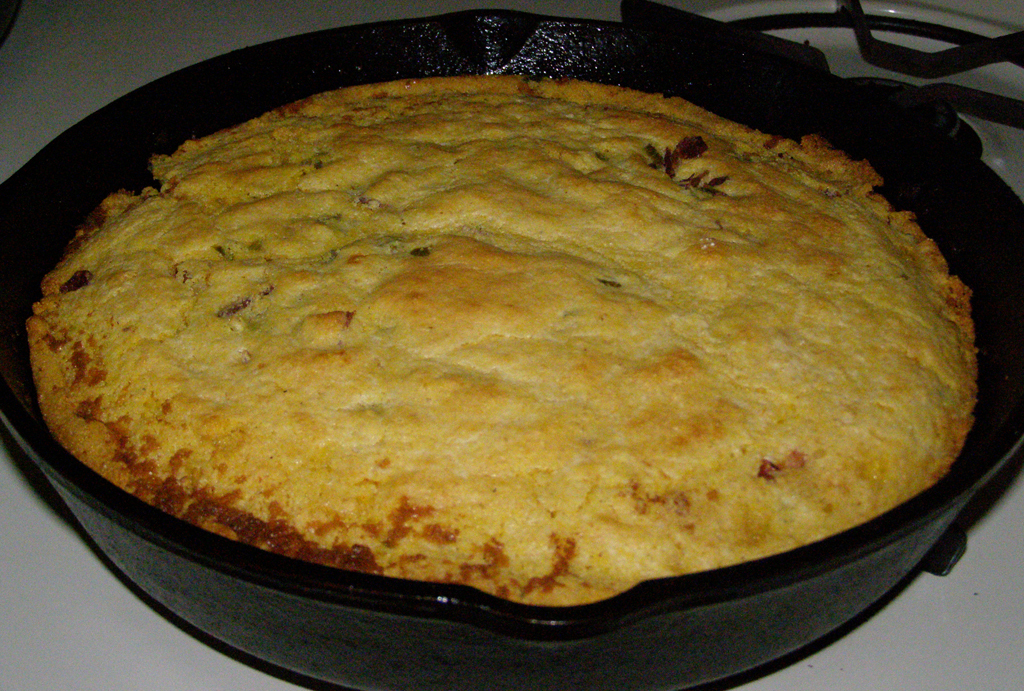
Cornbread is a staple Cajun starch.

Due to the extreme change in climate from that of Acadia, Acadians were unable to cook their original dishes. Soon, their former culinary traditions were adapted and, in time, incorporated Native American and African American traditions—as exemplified in the classic Cajun dish gumbo, which takes its name from the word for its principal ingredient, okra, in the West African Bambara language. In Louisiana, the Acadian settlers replaced the whole-wheat bread they were accustomed to with cornbread, which by the beginning of the 19th century they were eating with cane syrup. Between 1790 and 1810 most Louisiana Acadians bought one to three enslaved black persons, many from the West Indies, from whom they learned the use of new ingredients, including okra. The ragu sauces that the Cajuns developed are very similar to sauces used in French West Africa, possibly introduced by enslaved cooks.

Many other meals developed along these lines, adapted in part from Haiti, to become what are now considered classic Cajun cuisine traditions (in contrast to the more modern concepts associated with Paul Prudhomme's style).

Up through the 20th century, the meals were basic, not elaborate. The public's false perception of "Cajun" cuisine was based on Prudhomme's style of Cajun cooking, which was spicy, flavorful, and not true to the classic form of the cuisine.

Cajun and Creole cuisine have mistakenly been considered the same, but the origins of Creole cooking are in New Orleans, and Cajun cooking arose 40 years after its establishment. Today, most restaurants serve dishes that consist of Cajun styles, which Prudhomme dubbed "Louisiana cooking". In Cajun home cooking, these individual styles are still kept separate. However, there are fewer people cooking the classic Cajun dishes that would have been eaten by the original settlers.

An influx of Vietnamese immigrants to Gulf Coast states after the Vietnam War led to the establishment of the Viet-Cajun fusion style of cooking. Viet-Cajun dishes and restaurants can most commonly be found between Houston and New Orleans. A popular dish in this tradition is "Vietnamese style crawfish," or crawfish seasoned with Vietnamese spices.

== Cultural aspects ==
According to political scientist Kevin V. Mulcahy writing on cultural identity, Cajun cuisine today is different from that of the 19th and early 20th centuries, but still defines Cajun culture for many people within and outside Acadiana. Its heritage reflects French, Spanish, American Indian, German, and Afro-Caribbean influences. Cajun food is the result of this assimilation or "cultural blending". Rural Cajun cuisine is distinct from the urban Creole cuisine, having arisen by economic necessity among the Acadian immigrants who came to Louisiana in the 18th century. These settlers lived off the land and survived on foods they could obtain by hunting, fishing, ranching, foraging, or growing crops.

Although there is a large variety of dishes within the regions that make up Cajun country in Louisiana, rural Cajuns generally prefer strong dark roast coffee, highly seasoned foods, hot peppers, vegetables smothered in brown gravy, and one-pot dishes served with rice. Each region has its own specialties, such as andouille sausage on the west bank of the Mississippi River above New Orleans, formerly known as the German Coast; barbecued shrimp in Terrebonne Parish; tasso ham made from hog's shoulder in the area around Opelousas; and crawfish all across the parishes of southern Louisiana, where they are abundant in the fresh water wetlands and waterways.

Many Cajun recipes are based on rice and the "holy trinity" of onions, celery, and green pepper, and use locally caught shellfish such as shrimp and crawfish. Much of Cajun cookery starts with a roux made of wheat flour cooked and slowly stirred with a fat such as oil, butter or lard, known especially as the base for étouffée, gumbo and sauce piquante. Cajun cooks in south Louisiana historically have cooked meals in single pots, and still cook meats by braising. Almost all Cajun households had gardens up until the latter years of the 20th century, and lifted regional culinary standards by adding the fresh vegetables they grew to their dishes.

There was continuity in cuisines between the southern Bayou Teche area and the northern boundary of Cajun country in Avoyelles Parish. Fresh sausage, pork, and the use of salt and pepper as the main seasonings were universal in the region's foodway traditions, north and south. The role of seafood in the cuisine of the southern parishes distinguished it from that of the prairies, where more wild game was consumed instead.

Anthropologist Charlotte Paige Gutierrez has written extensively on Louisiana's traditional foodways. She writes: "The term foodways, as it is now used by writers in various disciplines, has a broad definition. The study of foodways may include the production, distribution, preparation, preservation, serving, and eating of food, as well as the social, symbolic, psychological, and behavioral aspects of food." Modern conveniences influenced Louisiana's culinary traditions: with the introduction of electricity and refrigerators, consuming freshly butchered meat immediately was not imperative as in the past, thus community events such as hog-killings (boucheries) occurred less frequently. Improved transportation and increased incomes made food stores more accessible and buying produce became more affordable for working families. Cajuns now bought their bread at a grocery store rather than baking their own. According to Gutierrez, when the economy of southern Louisiana boomed with the expansion of oil industry operations in the 1970s, Cajuns gained a renewed pride in their ethnicity.

Only those Cajuns who live near the coast are able to regularly harvest seafood such as crabs, oysters, shrimp, and saltwater fish directly from their habitats. Shrimping, crabbing, fishing, frog-gigging, and gardening have been practiced in Terrebonne and Lafourche Parishes as subsistence and commercial pursuits for many generations. Before the introduction of modern transportation and refrigeration, Cajuns who lived in the southwestern prairie parishes away from the coast had little opportunity to incorporate seafood into their diets. Today, fresh seafood is available all across Acadiana, so that now it is regarded as a regional food rather than one available only to coastal residents.

The cooking traditions of the western prairies and those of the Bayou country in southeastern Louisiana overlap in the lower and middle Bayou Teche region. The complicated network of lakes, streams, bayous, and the flood plains with their rich soil characterize the terrain of Iberia, St. Martin, and St. Mary parishes. The traditional cuisine uses those resources available in the area: pork from hog farms on the plains and seafood from the lowlands.

Seasoning practices in the Teche country occupy a middle place between the salt and black pepper-based approach to spices in the Bayou country and the prevalent use of cayenne pepper in the Cajun prairies. People along the lower and middle Teche use cayenne more often than in the Laforche area. Hot pepper sauce has a more dominant role in the Teche country cuisine than in other Cajun regions.

In the upper Teche region, wild game, freshwater fish, and pork are important in the local diet, with rabbit, duck, and venison being eaten more often than among their neighbors to southward. Avoyelles Parish, along the northern edge of Cajun country where cultural influences converge, shares some of these dietary features, although local cooking traditions are somewhat different than in the Teche country. Natives of the parish make fresh sausage, but cling to certain European customs, notably the preparation of cochon de lait róti, or roasted suckling pig. After the young pigs are slaughtered, they are suspended vertically by a rope tied to a tree limb and hang over a hardwood fire. For even cooking of the pig, it is rotated with a stick. Halfway through the roasting, the carcass is turned end for end to assure even heating of the meat. Local cooks have constructed improvised rotisseries, some fitting theirs with small motors for mechanized rotation.

The upper prairie, historically an area of small farms, ranches, and rice fields, has its own distinctive cuisine, well known for its smoked meats and boudin blanc, white sausage made of pork, rice, and seasonings. Local hardwoods such as oak, pecan, and hickory are used to smoke sausages and tasso. Smoked meats are comparatively rare, however, in other Cajun communities.

== Cajun cooking methods ==
- Barbecuing—similar to "low and slow" Southern barbecue traditions, but with Creole/Cajun seasoning. A classic example is Johnson's Boucaniere ("smokehouse") in Lafayette, which was named best barbecue in Louisiana by the Food Network in July 2022. In the Ville Platte area, a unique sauce is made from dried onions reconstituted in water and vegetable oil thick with ketchup, mustard, Worcestershire sauce, and seasonings. The flavorful oil that rises to the top is applied directly to meats being cooked as a baste. Two popular brands are Jack Miller's and Pig Stand, which are available online and in grocery stores across the state. This sauce is also commonly used on hamburgers, hot dogs, pork chops, chicken, and other grilled items.
- Baking—direct and indirect dry heat in a furnace or oven, faster than smoking but slower than grilling
- Grilling—direct heat on a shallow surface, fastest of all variants; sub-variants include:
  - Charbroiling—direct dry heat on a solid surface with wide raised ridges
  - Gridironing—direct dry heat on a solid or hollow surface with narrow raised ridges
  - Griddling—direct dry or moist heat along with the use of oils and butter on a flat surface
- Braising—combining a direct dry heat charbroil-grill or gridiron-grill with a pot filled with broth for direct moist heat, faster than smoking but slower than regular grilling and baking; time starts fast, slows down, then speeds up again to finish
- Boiling—as in boiling of blue crabs, crawfish, or shrimp, in seasoned liquid, often with side items like corn on the cob, whole new potatoes, and mushrooms cooked in the same boiling pot. A seafood boil is often a large outdoor social event.
- Deep frying—lightly breaded and fried seafood including various fish, shrimp, oysters, and soft-shell crab is universally popular in Cajun cuisine, often on French bread po-boys in the New Orleans style, along with traditional Southern favorites like fried chicken, fried okra, and pork chops.
- Smothering—cooking a vegetable or meat over low heat with the sauteed "trinity," plus small amounts of water or stock, similar to braising. This forms a pan sauce or gravy, and the finished product is served over rice. Étouffée is a popular variant done with crawfish or shrimp. A meatless version might feature mushrooms and eggplant. Two commonly smothered meats are pork chops and round steak; these heartier meats may sometimes have a bit of roux added to the gravy.
- Pan-broiling or pan-frying
- Injecting—using a large syringe-type setup to place seasoning deep inside large cuts of meat; this technique is much newer than the others on this list, but very common in Cajun cuisine
- Stewing, also known as fricassée; a whole chicken cut into pieces is a popular choice for this method, particularly an older hen.

Deep frying of turkeys or oven-roasted turduckens entered southern Louisiana cuisine more recently. Also, blackening of fish or chicken and barbecuing of shrimp in the shell are excluded because they were not prepared in traditional Cajun cuisine. Blackening was actually an invention by chef Paul Prudhomme in the 1970s, becoming associated with Cajun cooking, and presented as such by him, but is not a true historical or traditional Cajun cooking process.

== Ingredients ==
In the late 18th century, about the same time that Acadian musicians embraced the Spanish guitar, spices from the Iberian Peninsula were adopted in the Acadian cuisine. With the cross-cultural borrowing that took place between them and their neighbors in southern Louisiana, Acadians were eating African okra and American Indian corn by the time of the Louisiana Purchase (1803) in such dishes as gumbo, pain de maïs, and soupe de maïs, which did not closely resemble the African and Indian versions.

The following is a partial list of ingredients used in Cajun cuisine and some of the staple ingredients of the Acadian food culture.

=== Meat and seafood ===
Cajun foodways include many ways of preserving meat, some of which are waning due to the availability of refrigeration and mass-produced meat at the grocer. Smoking of meats remains a fairly common practice, but once-common preparations such as turkey or duck confit (preserved in poultry fat, with spices) are now seen even by Acadians as quaint rarities.

Game (and hunting) are still uniformly popular in Acadiana.

The recent increase of catfish farming in the Mississippi Delta has brought about an increase in its usage in Cajun cuisine in place of the more traditional wild-caught speckled trout.

- Andouille—a spicy smoked pork sausage, characterized by a coarse-ground texture and large-diameter casing.
- Boudin—a cooked sausage made with green onions, pork, and rice, and usually a large amount of ground pork or chicken livers. Boudin may be thought of as "dirty rice in a casing." Some locals prefer to eat the sausage with the casing on, while others squeeze the contents out. Boudin filling is completely cooked before being stuffed into casings and may be consumed immediately after purchase, although it is also popularly grilled at cookouts. Pork blood is sometimes added to produce boudin rouge. Other versions can contain seafood, such as crawfish.
- Chaurice, a sausage similar to Spanish chorizo
- Chaudin or ponce—a pig's stomach, stuffed with spiced pork & smoked.
- Ham hocks
- Wild boar or feral hog
- Head cheese
- Gratons—hog cracklings or pork rinds; fried, seasoned pork fat & skin, sometimes with small bits of meat attached. Similar to Spanish chicharrones.
- New Orleans hot sausage—a spiced pork or beef sausage characterized by a reddish color.
- Pork sausage (fresh)—distinctively seasoned and usually smoked, this sausage is often used in gumbos as is andouille, but it may also be grilled or pan-cooked to produce a rice and gravy dish. The sausage itself does not include rice, separating it from boudin. In Cajun country, a distinction exists between this sausage, which is simply called "pork sausage," is finer ground, and uses smaller pork casings, and the similar andouille, which has a coarser grind and larger beef casings.
- Salt pork
- Tasso—a highly seasoned, smoked pork shoulder

Beef and dairy
Though parts of Acadiana are well suited to cattle or dairy farming, beef is not often used in a pre-processed or uniquely Cajun form. It is usually prepared fairly simply as chops, stews, or steaks, taking a cue from Texas to the west. Ground beef is used as is traditional throughout the US, although seasoned differently.

Dairy farming is not as prevalent as in the past, but there are still some farms in the business. There are no unique dairy items prepared in Cajun cuisine. Traditional Cajun and New Orleans Creole-influenced desserts are common.

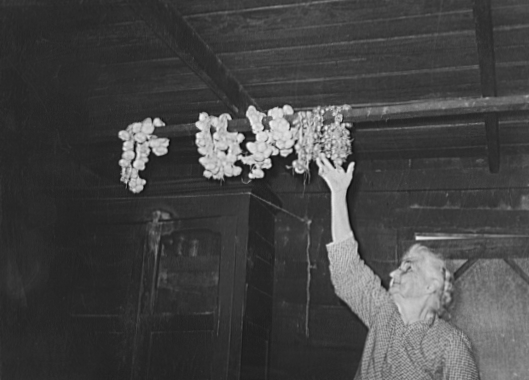
Cajun woman reaching for strings of garlic suspended from rafters. Near Crowley, Louisiana, 1938.

=== Seasonings ===
- Onion (bell pepper, onion, and celery used together are known as the "holy trinity" of Cajun cuisine)

Thyme, sage, mint, marjoram, savory, and basil are considered sweet herbs. In colonial times a herbes de Provence would be several sweet herbs tied up in a muslin.

==== Blended ====
- "Creole/Cajun spice" blends such as Tony Chachere's are sometimes used in Cajun kitchens, but do not suit every cook's style because Creole- and Cajun-style seasoning is often achieved from scratch, even by taste.

Cajun seasonings consist of a blend of salt with a variety of spices, most common being cayenne pepper and garlic. The spicy heat comes from the cayenne pepper, while other flavors come from bell pepper, paprika, green onions, parsley and more.

=== Cooking bases ===
- Dark roux—Cajuns inherited roux from the French. However, unlike the French, theirs is made with oil or bacon fat and more lately with olive oil, and not normally with butter. It is used as a thickening agent, especially in gumbo and étouffée.

Preparation of a dark roux is probably the most involved or complicated procedure in Cajun cuisine, involving heating fat and flour very carefully, constantly stirring for about 15–45 minutes (depending on the color of the desired product), until the mixture has darkened in color and developed a nutty flavor. The temperature should not be too high, as a burnt roux renders a dish unpalatable.

- Light roux—The secret to making a good gumbo is pairing the roux with the protein. A dark roux, with its strong (dense) nutty flavor will completely overpower a simple seafood gumbo, but is the perfect complement to a gumbo using chicken, sausage, crawfish or alligator.

A light roux, on the other hand, is better suited for strictly seafood dishes and unsuitable for meat gumbos for the reason that it does not support the heavier meat flavor as well. Pairing roux with protein follows the same orthodox philosophy as pairing wine with protein.

- Stocks: Cajun stocks are more heavily seasoned than Continental counterparts, and the shellfish stock sometimes made with shrimp and crawfish heads is unique to Cajun cuisine.

== Cajun dishes ==
=== Well-known dishes ===
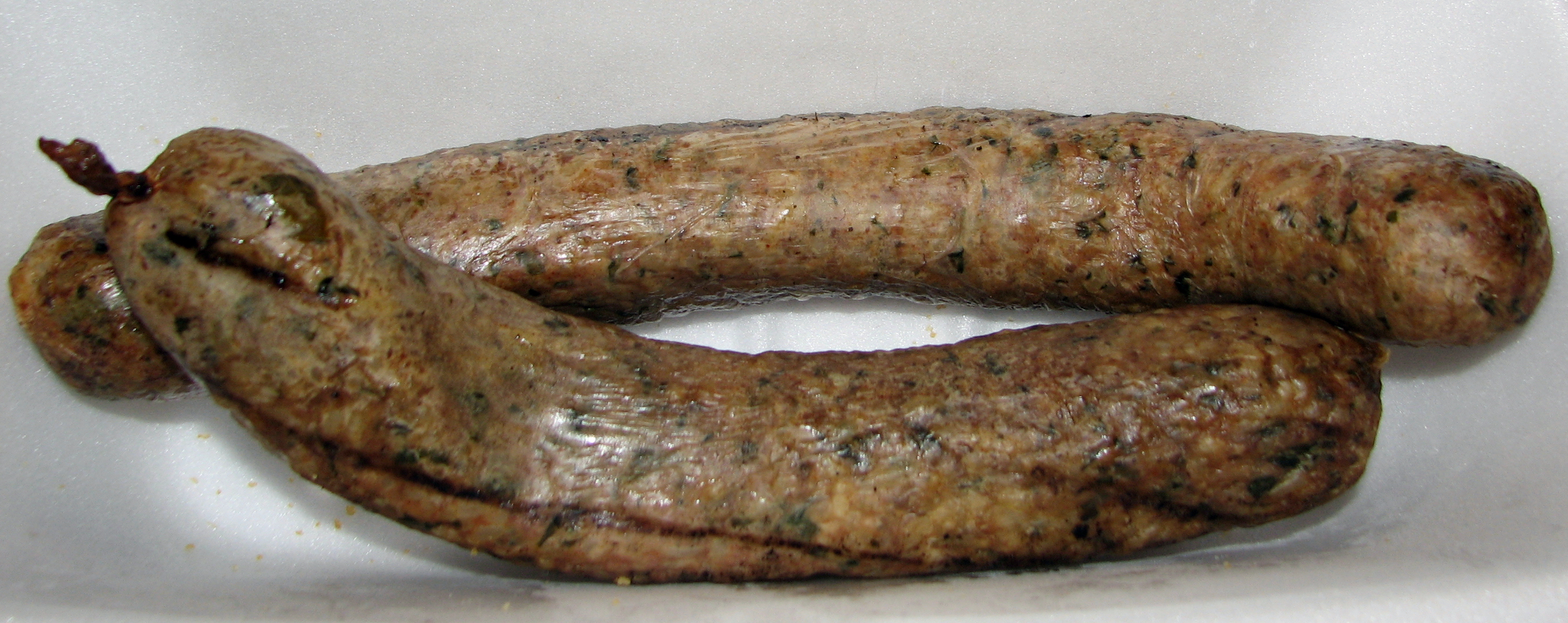
Smoked boudin

Boudin—a type of sausage made from pork, pork liver, rice, garlic, green onions and other spices. It is widely available by the link or pound from butcher shops. Boudin is typically stuffed in a natural casing and has a softer consistency than other, better-known sausage varieties. It is usually served with side dishes such as rice dressing, maque choux or bread. Boudin balls are commonly served in southern Louisiana restaurants and are made by taking the boudin out of the case and frying it in spherical form.

Gumbo—Among the best-known elements of Cajun cooking are the soups called gumbos. Contrary to non-Cajun or Continental beliefs, gumbo does not mean simply "everything in the pot". Gumbo exemplifies the influence of French, Spanish, African and Native American food cultures on Cajun cuisine.

The origins of the word gumbo are in West Africa. Kellersberger Vass lists kingumbo and tshingombo as the Bantu words for okra, while John Laudon of the University of Louisiana says the word gombo is a French word that came to the Western Hemisphere from West Africa, where okra was known as (ki) ngombo along much of the region's coast.

Both filé and okra can be used as thickening agents in gumbo. Historically, large amounts of filé were added directly to the pot when okra was out of season. While a distinction between filé gumbo and okra gumbo is still held by some, many people enjoy putting filé in okra gumbo simply as a flavoring. Regardless of which is the dominant thickener, filé is also provided at the table and added to taste.

Many claim that gumbo is a Cajun dish, but gumbo was established long before the Acadian arrival. Its early existence came via the early French Creole culture in New Orleans, where French, Spanish and Africans frequented, and it was later also influenced by Italian, German and Irish settlers.

The backbone of a gumbo is roux, as described above. Cajun gumbo typically favors darker roux, often approaching the color of chocolate or coffee beans. Since the starches in the flour break down more with longer cooking time, a dark roux has less thickening power than a lighter one. While the stovetop method is traditional, flour may also be dry-toasted in an oven for a fat-free roux, or a regular roux may be prepared in a microwave oven for a hands-off method. If the roux is for immediate use, the "trinity" may be sauteed in it, which stops the cooking process.

A classic gumbo is made with chicken and andouille, especially in the colder months, but the ingredients vary according to what is available. Seafood gumbos are also very popular in Cajun country.

Jambalaya—The only certain thing that can be said about jambalaya is that it contains rice, some sort of meat (often chicken, ham, sausage, or a combination), seafood (such as shrimp or crawfish), plus other items that may be available. Usually, it will include green peppers, onions, celery, tomatoes and hot chili peppers. This is also a great pre-Acadian dish, established by the Spanish in Louisiana. Jambalaya may be a tomato-rich New Orleans-style "red" jambalaya of Spanish Creole roots, or a Cajun-style "brown" jambalaya which draws its color and flavor from browned meat and caramelized onions. Historically, tomatoes were not as widely available in Acadiana as the area around New Orleans, but in modern times, both styles are popular across the state. Brown is the style served at the annual World Jambalaya Festival in Gonzales.

Rice and gravy—Rice and gravy dishes are a staple of Cajun cuisine and is usually a brown gravy based on pan drippings, which are deglazed and simmered with extra seasonings and served over steamed or boiled rice.

The dish is traditionally made from cheaper cuts of meat and cooked in a cast-iron pot, typically for an extended time period to let the tough cuts of meat become tender. Beef, pork, chicken or any of a large variety of game meats are used for its preparation. Popular local varieties include hamburger steak, smothered rabbit, turkey necks, and chicken fricassee.

=== Food as an event ===
==== Crawfish boil ====
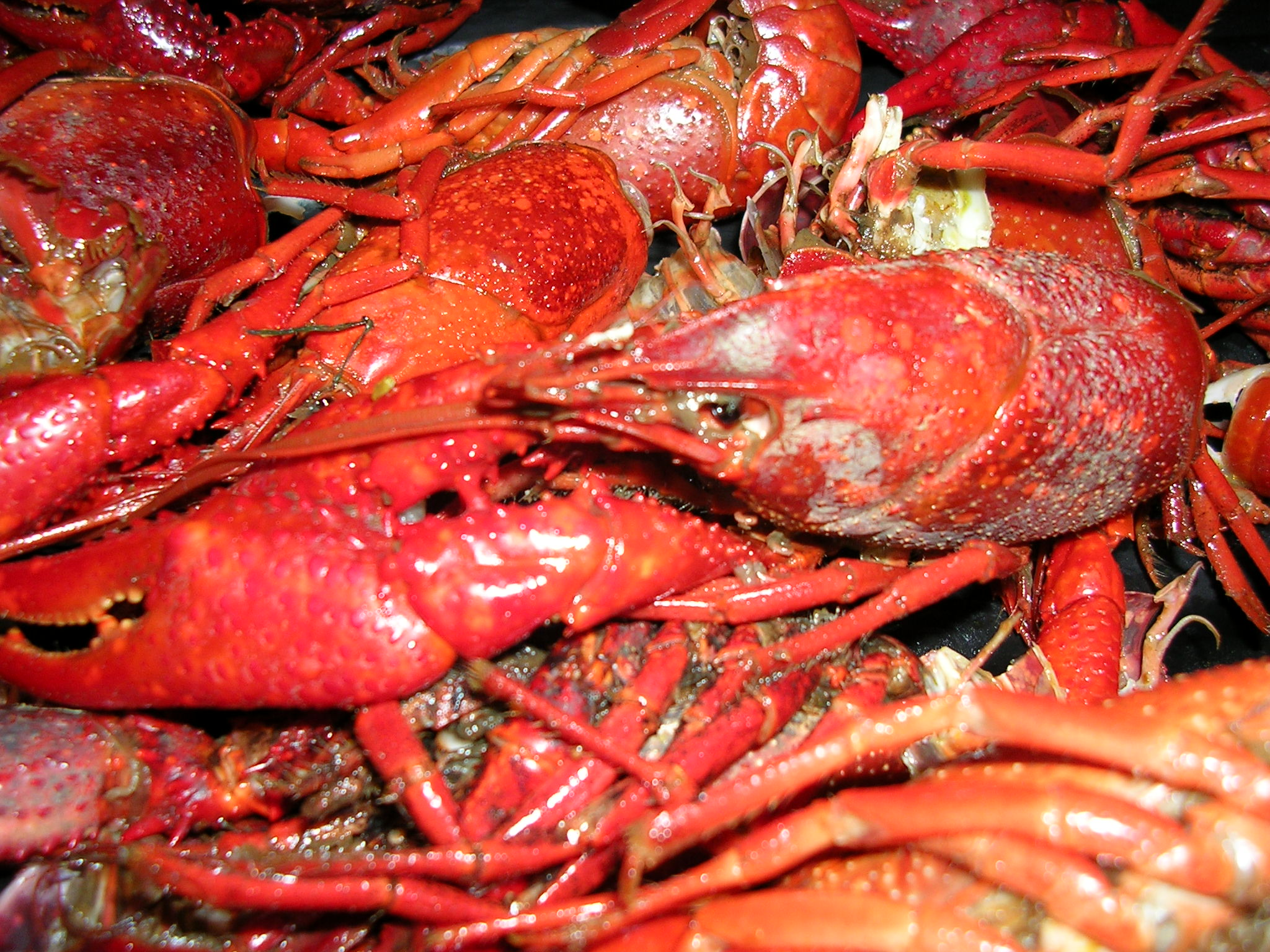
Louisiana-style crawfish boil

The crawfish boil is a celebratory event where Cajuns boil crawfish, potatoes, onions and corn in large pots over propane cookers. Lemons and small muslin bags containing a mixture of bay leaves, mustard seeds, cayenne pepper, and other spices, commonly known as "crab boil" or "crawfish boil" are added to the water for seasoning.

The results are then dumped onto large, newspaper-draped tables and in some areas covered in Creole/Cajun spice blends, such as REX, Zatarain's, Louisiana Fish Fry, or Tony Chachere's. Also, cocktail sauce, mayonnaise, and hot sauce are sometimes used. The seafood is scooped onto large trays or plates and eaten by hand.

During times when crawfish are not abundant, shrimp and crabs are prepared and served in the same manner.

Attendees are encouraged to "suck the head" of a crawfish by separating the head from the abdomen of the crustacean and sucking out the fat and juices from the head.

Often, newcomers to the crawfish boil or those unfamiliar with the traditions are jokingly warned "not to eat the dead ones." This comes from the common belief that when live crawfish are boiled, their tails curl beneath themselves, but when dead crawfish are boiled, their tails are straight and limp. Seafood boils with crabs and shrimp are also popular.

==== Family boucherie ====
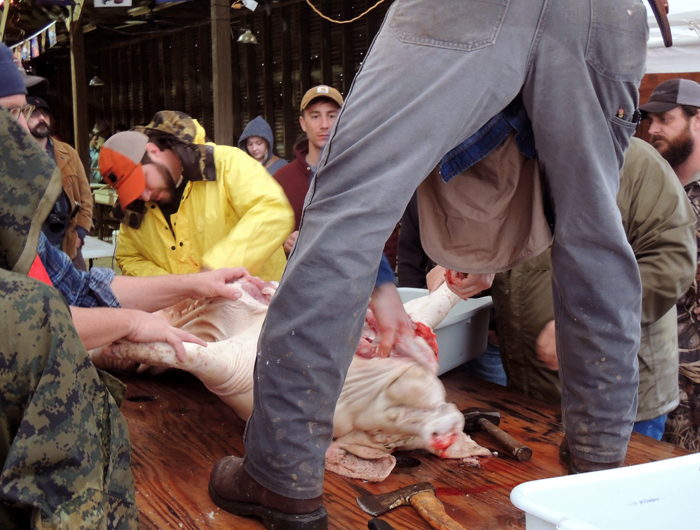
A traditional boucherie near Eunice, Louisiana

The traditional Cajun outdoor food event is hosted by a farmer in the rural areas of Acadiana. Family and friends of the farmer gather to socialize, play games, dance, drink, and have a copious meal consisting of hog and other dishes. Men have the task of slaughtering a hog, cutting it into usable parts, and cooking the main pork dishes while women have the task of making boudin.

==== Cochon de lait ====
Similar to a family boucherie, the cochon de lait is a food event that revolves around pork but does not need to be hosted by a farmer. Traditionally, a suckling pig was purchased for the event, but in modern cochon de laits, adult pigs are used.

Unlike the family boucherie, a hog is not butchered by the hosts and there are generally not as many guests or activities. The host and male guests have the task of roasting the pig (see pig roast) while female guests bring side dishes.

==== Rural Mardi Gras ====
The traditional Cajun Mardi Gras (Courir de Mardi Gras) is celebrated in rural Cajun parishes. The tradition originated in the 18th century with the Cajuns of Louisiana, but it was abandoned in the early 20th century because of unwelcome violence associated with the event. In the early 1950s the tradition was revived in Mamou in Evangeline Parish.

The event revolves around male maskers on horseback who ride into the countryside to collect food ingredients for the party later on. They entertain householders with Cajun music, dancing, and festive antics in return for the ingredients. The preferred ingredient is fresh chicken: the householder throws a live chicken to the maskers, allowing them to chase it down (symbolizing a hunt); other ingredients include rice, sausage, vegetables, or a frozen chicken if a live one is not available.

Unlike other Cajun events, men take no part in cooking the main course for the party, and women prepare the chicken and ingredients for the gumbo. Once the festivities begin, the Cajun community members eat and dance to Cajun music until midnight, after which Lent begins.

== List of Cajun-influenced chefs ==
- Frank Joseph Davis
- John Folse
- Emeril Lagasse
- Paul Prudhomme
- Justin Wilson

== See also ==
- Cuisine of New Orleans
- Cuisine of the United States
- List of festivals in Louisiana
- Louisiana Creole cuisine
- Acadian cuisine
