= Tasso ham =

Smoked, spiced, and cured meat

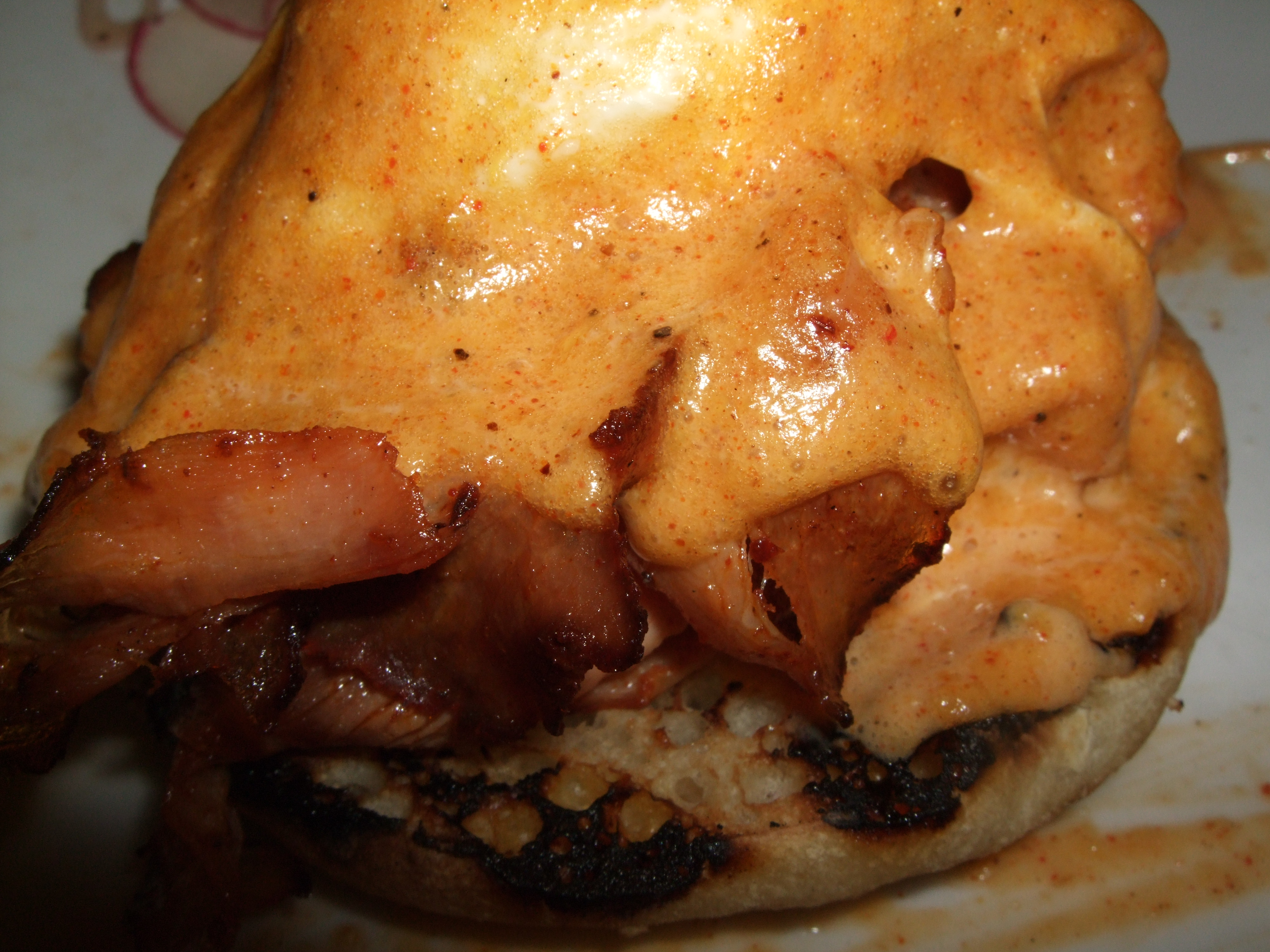
Poached eggs with tasso, griddled tomato and south Louisiana hollandaise

Tasso ham is a smoked, spiced, and cured meat, a specialty of south Louisiana cuisine. In this case "ham" is a misnomer since tasso is not made from the hind leg of a hog, but rather the hog's shoulder. This cut is typically fatty, and because the muscle is constantly used by the animal, has a great deal of flavor. The shoulder (also called the butt), which will weigh 7 to 8 pounds, is sliced across the grain into pieces about 3 in (7.5 cm) thick. These are dredged in a salt cure, which usually includes sodium nitrite and sugar. The meat is left to cure briefly, only three or four hours, then rinsed, rubbed with a spice mixture containing cayenne pepper and garlic, and hot-smoked until cooked through.

Though tasso may be eaten on its own, it is more often used as part of a flavor base for stews or braised vegetables. It is used in dishes ranging from pasta to crab cakes to soup and gravy. Appropriate to its roots, tasso is most often found in recipes of Creole or Cajun origin, such as jambalaya.

== See also ==
- List of smoked foods
