= Andouille =

Type of sausage

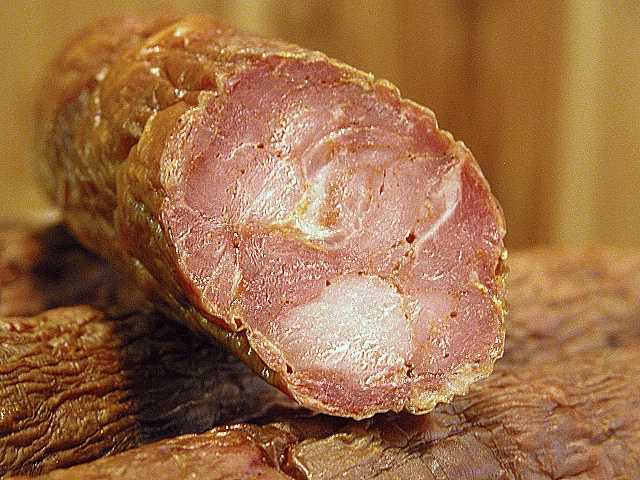
- Cajun andouille
- Course: Sausage
- Place of origin: France
- Main ingredients: Pork, garlic, pepper, onions, wine, pork chitterlings, tripe

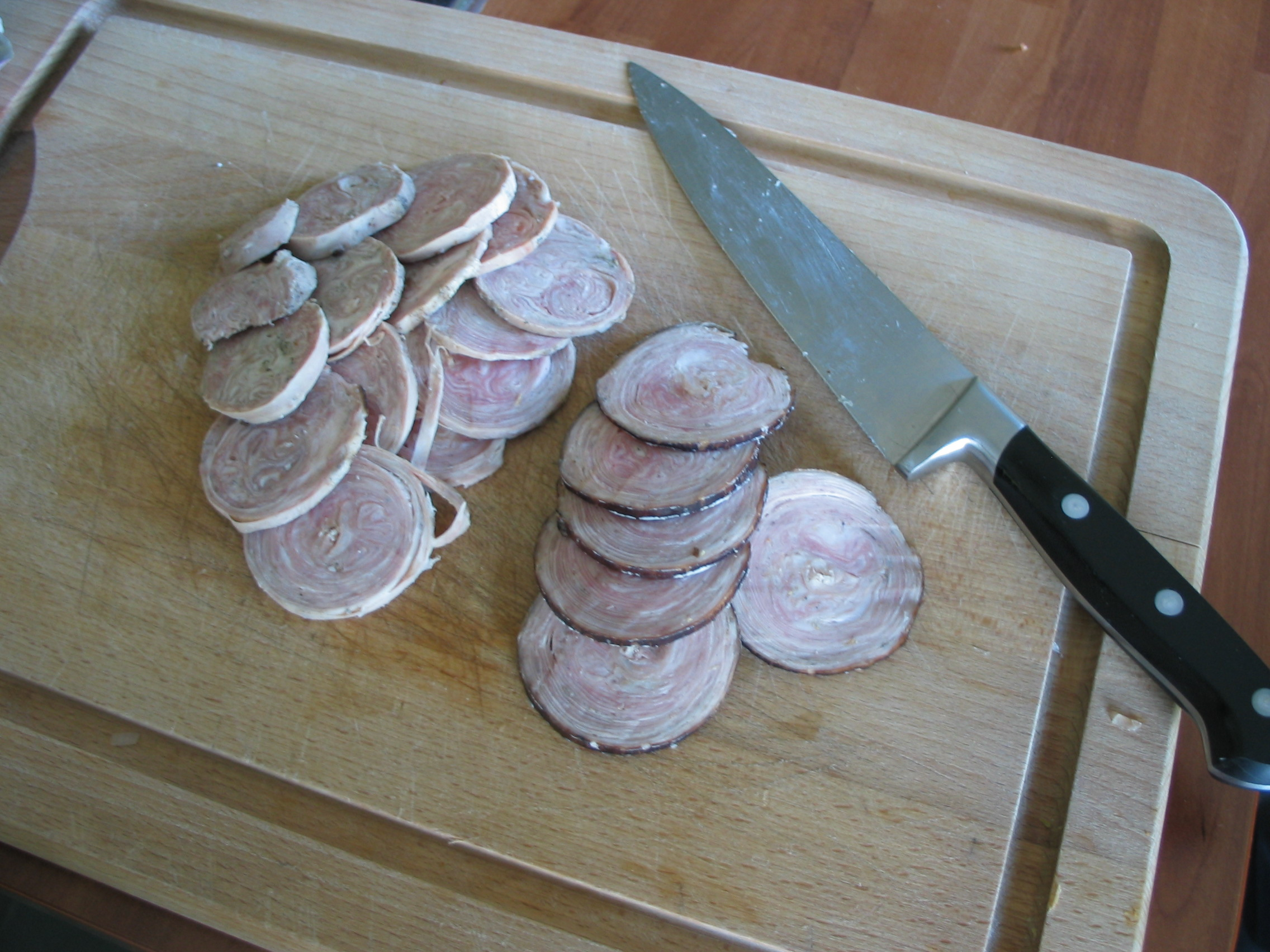
French andouille from Guémené-sur-Scorff, France

Andouille (/ænˈduːi/ ann-DOO-ee, /ɑːn-/ ahn-; French: [ɑ̃duj]; from Latin induco) is a smoked sausage made using pork, originating in France but also known as an element in Cajun cuisine.

== France ==
In France, particularly Brittany and Normandy, the traditional ingredients of andouille are primarily pig chitterlings, tripe, onions, wine, and seasoning. It is generally grey and has a distinctive odor. A similar, but unsmoked and smaller, sausage is called andouillette, literally "little andouille". Some andouille varieties use the pig's entire gastrointestinal system. Various French regions have their own recipes such as: "l’andouille de Guémené", "de Vire", "de Cambrai", "d’Aire-sur-la-Lys", "de Revin", "de Jargeau", "de Bretagne", or "du Val d'Ajol".

=== Protected status ===
Andouille de Vire has been registered as a Protected Geographical Indication (PGI) under European Union law since 2019.

== Italy ==
'Nduja, a spreadable pork salami from Calabria, probably originates as a variation of andouille, originally introduced to Italy in the 13th century by the Angevins.

== United States ==
In the U.S., the sausage is most often associated with Louisiana Cajun cuisine, where it is a coarse-grained smoked sausage made using pork, garlic, pepper, onions, wine, and seasonings. Once the casing is stuffed, the sausage is smoked again (double smoked). Nicknamed the "Andouille Capital of the World", the town of LaPlace, Louisiana, on the Mississippi River, is especially noted for its Cajun andouille.

Though somewhat similar, andouille is not to be confused with "hot links", New Orleans hot sausage, or similar finely ground, high-fat, heavily peppered sausages.

== See also ==
- Cuisine and specialties of Nord-Pas-de-Calais
- List of sausages
- List of smoked foods
