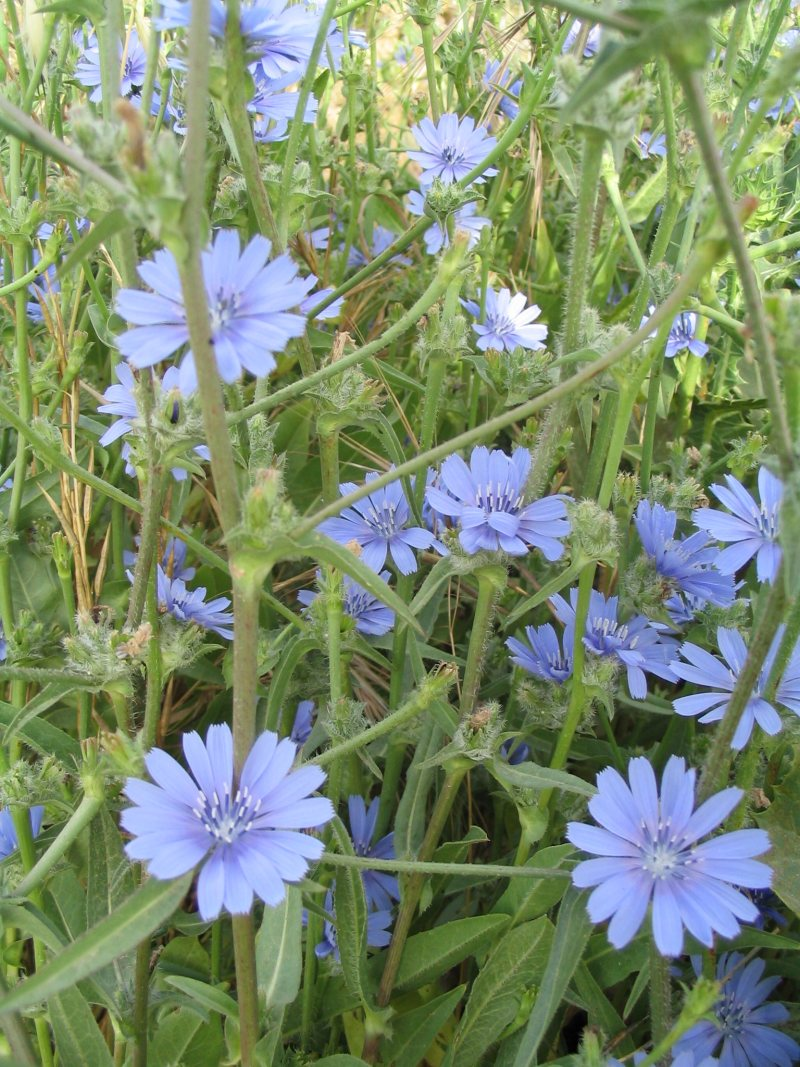
- Wild endive (Cichorium pumilum)

Scientific classification
- Kingdom: Plantae
- Clade: Tracheophytes
- Clade: Angiosperms
- Clade: Eudicots
- Clade: Asterids
- Order: Asterales
- Family: Asteraceae
- Genus: Cichorium
- Species: C. pumilum

Binomial name
- Cichorium pumilum Jacq.

Synonyms
- Synonymy: Cichorium ambiguum Schult.; Cichorium dichotomum Link; Cichorium divaricatum Schousb.; Cichorium glandulosum Boiss. & A.Huet; Cichorium minimum Port.; Cichorium nanum Port. ex Nyman; Cichorium noeanum Boiss.; Cichorium polystachyum Pomel

= Cichorium pumilum =

Species of flowering plant

Cichorium pumilum is a Mediterranean species of plant in the tribe Cichorieae within the family Asteraceae. Like the other species of Cichorium, its leaves are edible by humans. The plant produces bluish-violet flower heads and fleshy taproots.
