= New Orleans hot sausage =

Sausage

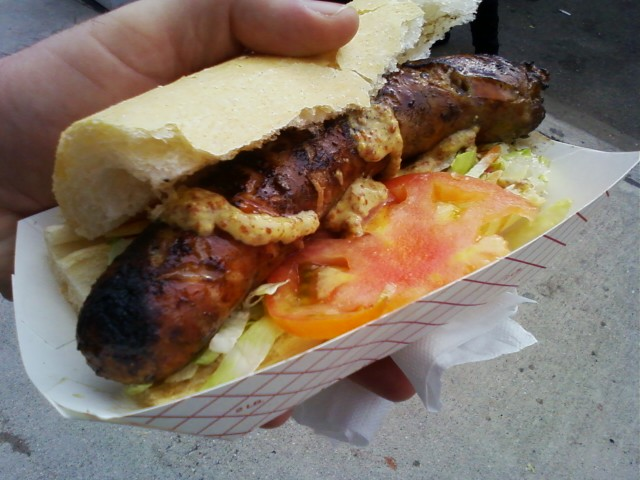
- Hot sausage po'boy at the Po'Boy Preservation Festival
- Type: Sausage
- Place of origin: New Orleans
- Associated cuisine: Louisiana Creole cuisine and Cajun cuisine
- Main ingredients: Ground pork or beef, cayenne pepper, paprika, various spices

New Orleans hot sausage is a type of sausage used in Cajun and Louisiana Creole cuisine.

== History ==
Hot sausage, also known as "Creole chaurice" in French, is a part of the historical cuisine of Creoles of color.

== Description ==
It is traditionally made of pork or a blend of beef and pork, although some brands like A.P. Patton's make all-beef hot sausage. New Orleans hot sausage is traditionally seasoned with cayenne pepper, paprika, onions, garlic, black pepper and salt. Some variations include other seasonings such as sage, thyme, or red pepper flakes. It is commonly produced in both patty and link form, but is separate from hot links. The sausage takes its reddish color from the seasonings used.

== Uses ==
Po' boys made with hot sausage patties or links are a traditional part of New Orleans street food. Hot sausage po'boys are prepared by placing a patty on po'boy bread with melted American cheese, mayonnaise, and sliced lettuce, tomato, onion and pickles. Hot sauce and Creole mustard may also be used as condiments. Restaurants in southern Louisiana also commonly mix hot sausage with ground beef to make seasoned hamburger patties.

It is also used in gumbo, with breakfast dishes, or served with red beans and rice.
