= Shrimp creole =

Spicy rice dish with shrimp

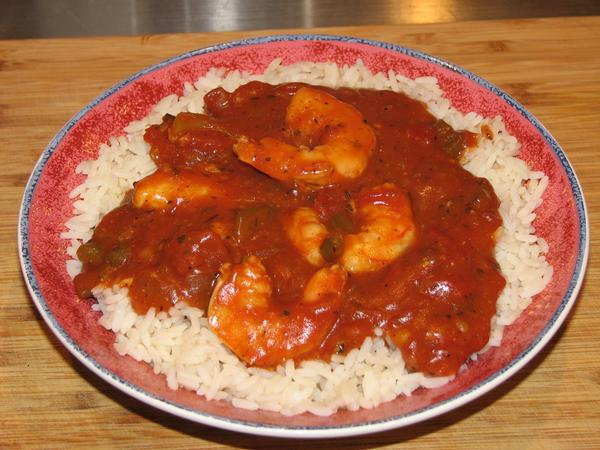
- Shrimp creole
- Course: Main
- Place of origin: United States
- Region or state: Louisiana
- Main ingredients: Shrimp, tomatoes, rice, onions, celery, bell pepper, spices

Shrimp creole is a dish of Louisiana Creole origin (French, Spanish, and African heritage), consisting of cooked shrimp in a mixture of whole or diced tomatoes, the "holy trinity" of onion, celery and bell pepper, spiced with hot pepper sauce or cayenne-based seasoning, and served over steamed or boiled white rice. The shrimp may be cooked in the mixture or cooked separately and added at the end. Other "creole" dishes may be made by substituting some other meat or seafood for the shrimp, or omitting the meat entirely.

Creole-type dishes combine the qualities of a gumbo and a jambalaya. They are typically thicker and spicier than a gumbo, and the rice is prepared separately and used as a bed for the Creole mixture, rather than cooked in the same pot as with a jambalaya. Creole dishes also do not contain broth or roux; instead, the creole mixture is simmered to its desired degree of thickness. Apart from the foundation ingredients of onion, celery, and bell pepper, Creole dishes are free-form "improvisational" dishes, as the basic recipe may be altered to include whatever ingredients the cook has available.
