= Louisiana Creole cuisine =

American regional cuisine

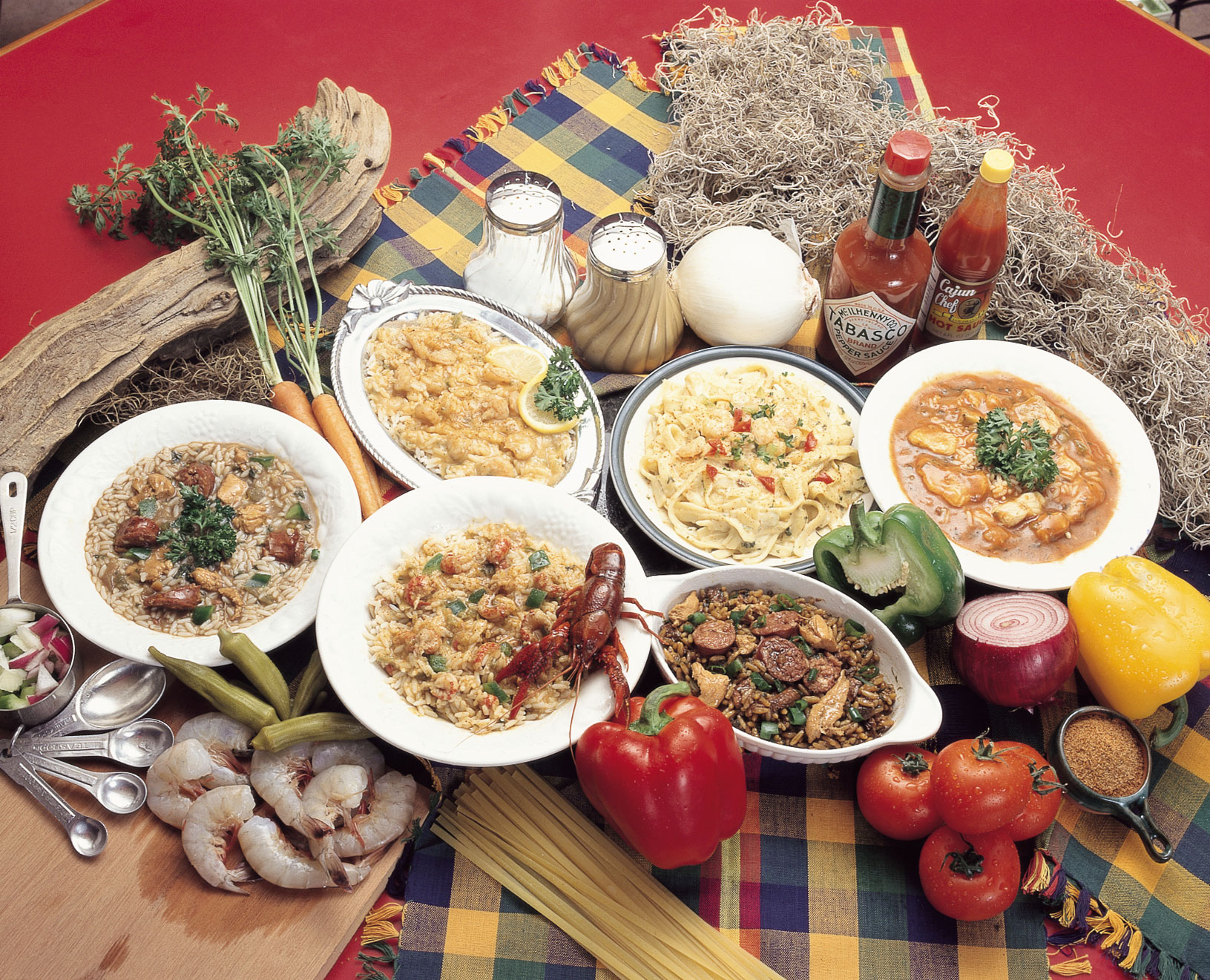
Dishes typical of Creole food

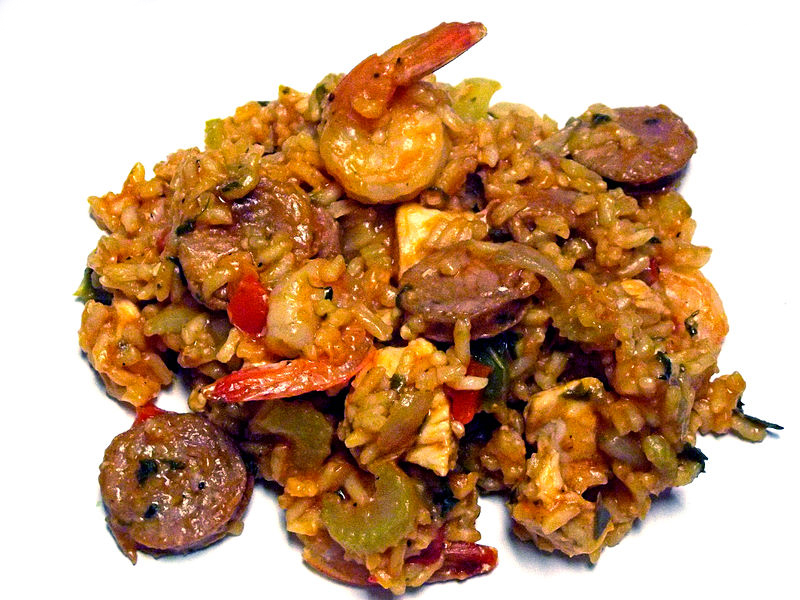
An example of Creole jambalaya

Louisiana Creole cuisine (French: cuisine créole, Louisiana Creole: manjê kréyòl, Spanish: cocina criolla) is a style of cooking originating in Louisiana, United States, which blends West African, French, Spanish, and Native American influences, as well as influences from the general cuisine of the Southern United States.

Creole cuisine revolves around influences found in Louisiana from populations present there before its sale to the United States in the Louisiana Purchase of 1803.

The term Creole describes the population of people in French colonial Louisiana which consisted of the descendants of the French and Spanish, and over the years the term grew to include Acadians, Germans, Caribbeans and native-born slaves of African descent as well as those of mixed racial ancestry.

Creole food is a blend of the various cultures that found their way to Louisiana including French, Spanish, Acadian, Caribbean, West African, German and Native American, among others.

== History ==
The Picayune Creole Cook Book has been described as "an authentic and complete account of the Creole kitchen". It was published in 1900 during a time when formerly enslaved African Americans and their descendants were moving North. Local newspapers warned that when the last of the "race of Creole cooks" left New Orleans "the secrets of the Louisiana Kitchen" would be lost.

The recipes published in the cookbook were compiled by an unknown staffer at the Daily Picayune, who said the recipes came directly from "the old Creole 'mammies'". Since its initial publication it has been released in 16 subsequent editions with few alterations to the original recipes.

Both Creole and Cajun cuisine draw from French cooking traditions adapted to Louisiana's resources and influences; however, Creole cuisine is stereotypically considered more "city food" while Cajun cuisine is considered simpler "country food".

== Classic Creole dishes ==
=== Appetizers ===
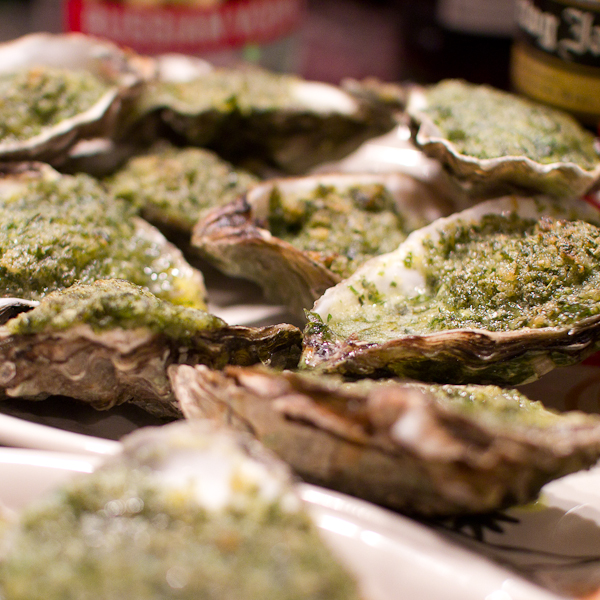
Oysters Rockefeller

- Oysters Bienville
- Oysters en brochette
- Oysters Rockefeller
- Shrimp remoulade

=== Soups ===
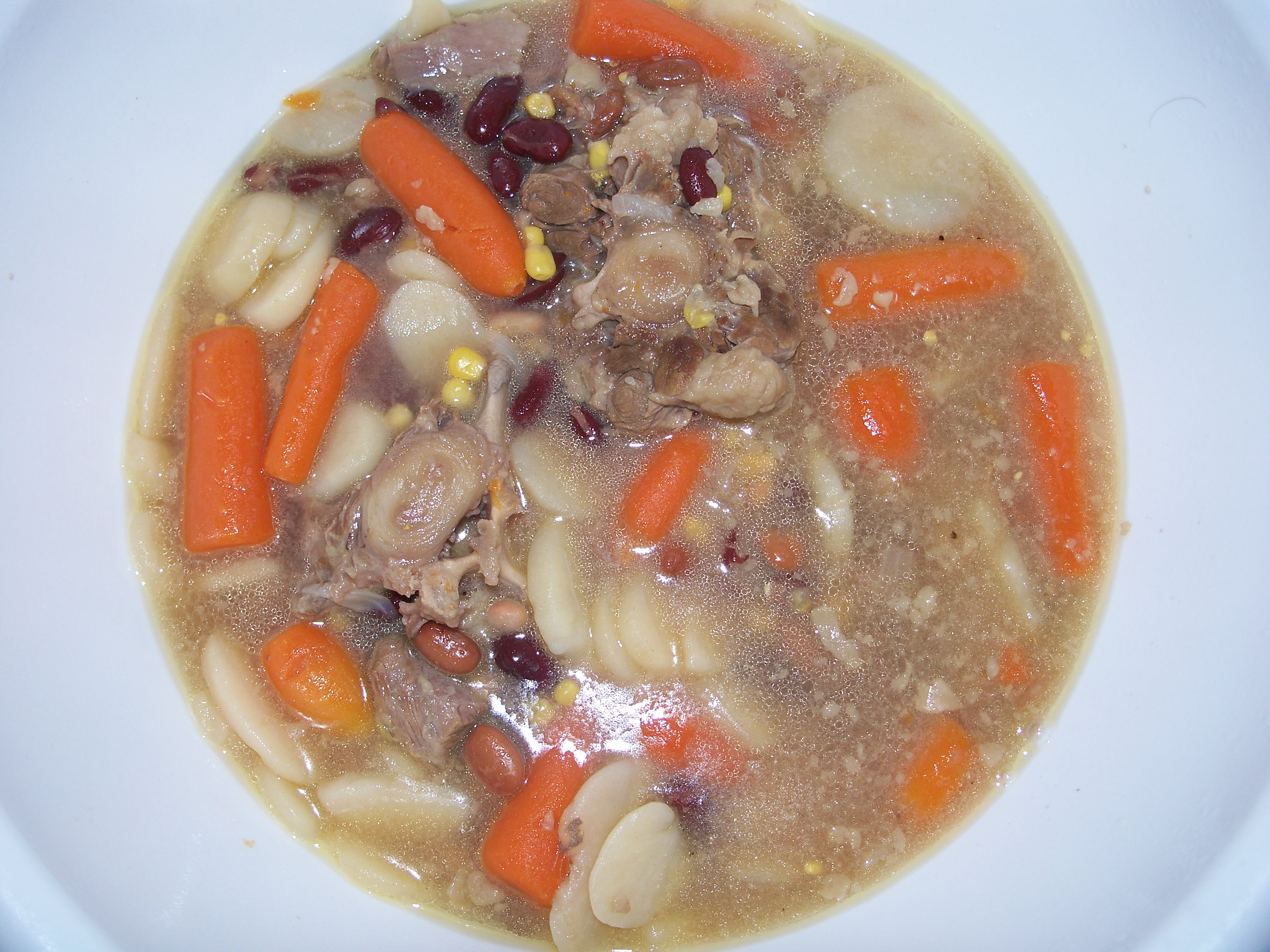
Southern oxtail soup

- Bisque
- Gumbo
- Turtle soup

=== Main dishes ===
- Chicken creole
- Crawfish étouffée
- Creole baked chicken
- Creole chicken fricassée
- Grillades
- Gumbo
- Jambalaya
- Mirliton
- Pompano en papillote
- Red beans and rice
- Rice and gravy
- Shrimp bisque
- Shrimp creole
- Smothered pork chops
- Trout a la meunière

=== Side dishes ===
- Dirty rice
- Red beans
- Smothered green beans with sausage and potatoes

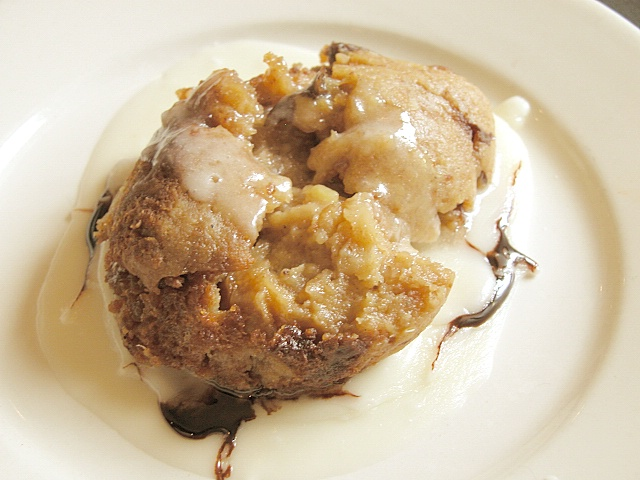
Creole bread pudding with vanilla whiskey sauce in New Orleans, Louisiana

=== Desserts ===
Sugar first arrived in Louisiana from Saint-Domingue in the mid-1700s. Sugarcane could be chewed plain, and it was not until 1795 that Etienne de Boré mastered the process of crystallizing sugar at his plantation (present-day Audubon Park) in New Orleans.

Sugar began to replace cotton as the local cash crop and by 1840 the state was home to over 1,500 sugar mills and by 1860 over 300,000 slaves worked in various aspects of sugar production. Slave labor was needed not only in the fields, but also supported agricultural activities in other skilled roles like carpentry and metalworking. Louisiana accounted for around 90% of all national sugar production in the antebellum era.

Creole cuisine is known for desserts like king cake, pralines, and sweet dough pie. Regional desserts feature local fruits and nuts, such as berries, figs and pecans. In the early 20th century cane syrup became a staple ingredient, and is used in recipes for pecan pie, gingerbread, spice cookies, and gateau de sirop, or served plain with pancakes or hot buttermilk biscuits, similar to maple syrup in the cuisine of New England.

- Banana pudding
- Bananas Foster
- Beignets
- Doberge cake

=== Beverages ===
- Café Brûlot
- Café au lait
- Chicory coffee
- Ramos gin fizz
- Sazerac cocktail
- Vieux Carré
- Brandy milk punch

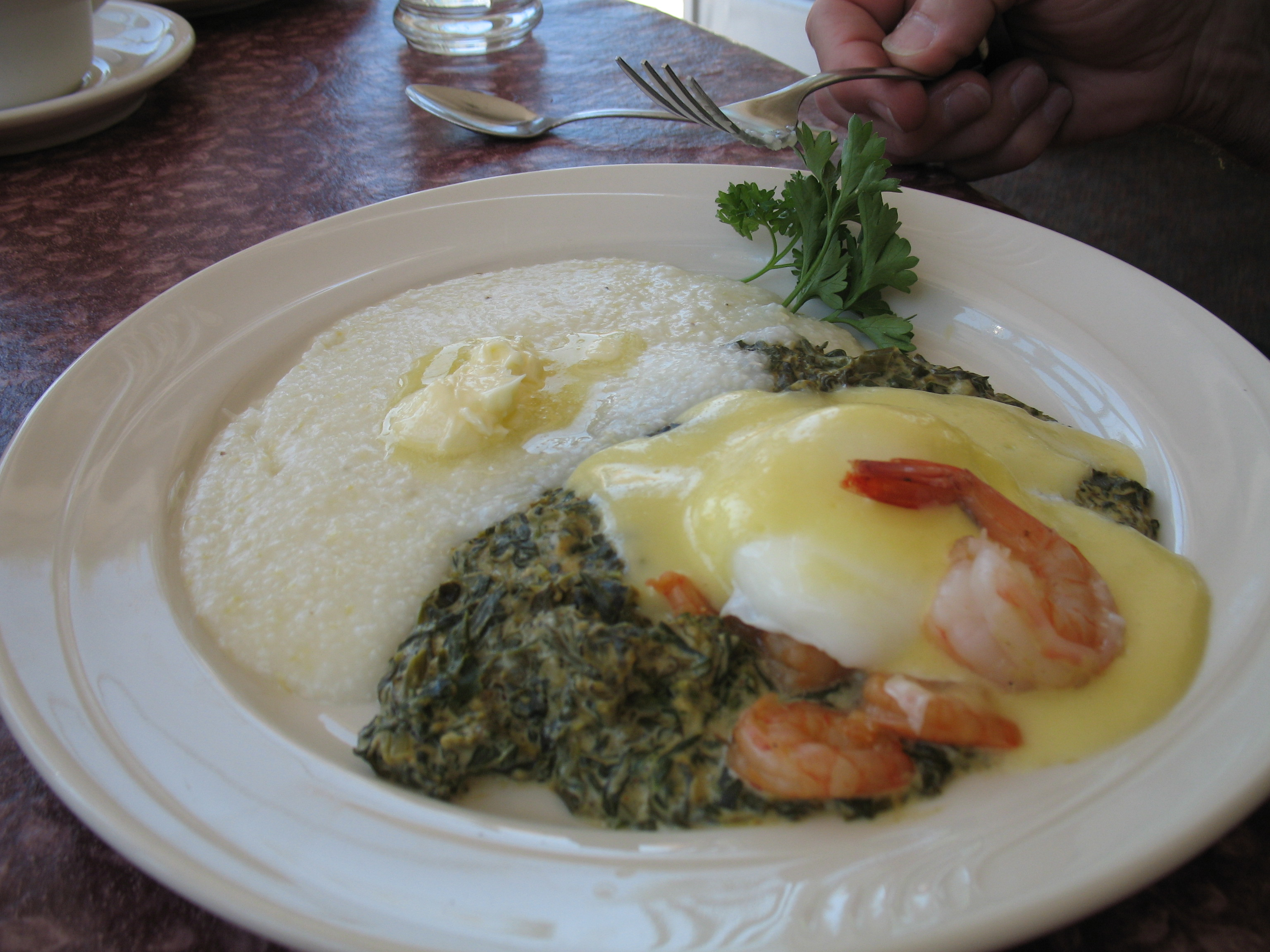
Eggs Sardou with gulf shrimp added and grits on the side

=== Breakfast ===
- Calas
- Eggs Sardou
- Grits and grillades
- French toast (pain perdu, or "lost bread")
- Beignet

=== Condiments ===
- Creole cream cheese
- Pepper jelly
- Remoulade
- Creole mustard
- Blue Plate Mayonnaise

== Creole cooking methods ==
- Barbecuing—similar to "slow and low" Southern barbecue traditions, but with Creole seasoning.
- Baking—direct and indirect dry heat in a furnace or oven, faster than smoking but slower than grilling.
- Grilling—direct heat on a shallow surface, fastest of all variants; sub-variants include:
  - Charbroiling—direct dry heat on a solid surface with wide raised ridges.
  - Gridironing—direct dry heat on a solid or hollow surface with narrow raised ridges.
  - Griddling—direct dry or moist heat along with the use of oils and butter on a flat surface.
- Braising—combining a direct dry-heat charbroil grill or gridiron grill with a pot filled with broth for direct moist heat, faster than smoking but slower than regular grilling and baking; time starts fast, slows down, then speeds up again to finish.
- Boiling—as in boiling of crabs, crawfish, or shrimp, in seasoned liquid.
- Deep frying
- Smothering—cooking a vegetable or meat with low heat and small amounts of water or stock, similar to braising. Étouffée is a popular variant done with crawfish or shrimp.
- Pan-broiling or pan-frying.
- Injecting—using a large syringe-type setup to place seasoning deep inside large cuts of meat. This technique is much newer than the others on this list, but very common in Creole cooking.
- Stewing, also known as fricassée.

Deep-frying of turkeys or oven-roasted turduckens entered southern Louisiana cuisine more recently.

== Ingredients ==
The following is a partial list of ingredients used in Creole cuisine and some of the staple ingredients.

=== Grains ===
- Corn
- Rice—long, medium, or short grain white

Rice proved to be a valuable commodity in Creole cuisine. With an abundance of water and a hot, humid climate, rice could be grown practically anywhere in the region and grew wild in some areas. Rice became the predominant starch in the diet, as it was easy to grow, store and prepare. The oldest rice mill in operation in the United States, the Conrad Rice Mill, is located in New Iberia. Recently, LSU has released two types of "high-yielding, conventional" rice from their agricultural center.

- Wheat (for baking bread)

=== Fruits and vegetables ===
- Bell peppers
- Blackberries
- Cayenne peppers
- Celery
- Collard greens
- Cucumbers
- Figs
- Limes
- Lemons
- Mirlitons (also called chayotes or vegetable pears)
- Muscadines
- Okra
- Onions
- Satsuma oranges
- Scallions (also known as green onions or onion tops)
- Squash
- Strawberries
- Sweet potatoes
- Tabasco pepper
- Tomatoes

=== Meat and seafood ===
Creole folkways include many techniques for preserving meat, some of which are waning due to the availability of refrigeration and mass-produced meat at the grocer. Smoking of meats remains a fairly common practice, but once-common preparations such as turkey or duck confit (preserved in poultry fat, with spices) are now seen even by Acadians as quaint rarities.

Game is still uniformly popular in Creole cooking.

The recent increase of catfish farming in the Mississippi Delta has increased its usage in Creole cuisine, replacing the more traditional wild-caught trout (the saltwater species) and red fish.

Seafood

- Freshwater
  - Bass—commonly known as green trout in south Louisiana
  - Catfish
  - Sac-au-Lait—white perch or crappie
  - Yellow perch
- Saltwater or brackish water species
  - Trout
  - Redfish
  - Pompano
  - Drumfish
  - Flounder
  - Grouper
  - Perch—many varieties
  - Snapper—many varieties
- Shellfish
  - Crawfish (ecrevisse) – either wild swamp or farm-raised
  - Shrimp, or crevette (chevrette in Colonial Louisiana French)
  - Oysters
  - Blue crab

Also included in the seafood mix are some so-called trash fish that would not sell at market because of their high bone to meat ratio or required complicated cooking methods. These were brought home by fishermen to feed the family. Examples are garfish, black drum also called gaspergou or just goo, croaker, and bream.

Poultry

- Farm-raised
  - Turkey (and turkey confit)
  - Chicken (and Guinea hen)
- Game birds
  - Dove
  - Goose
  - Quail
  - Duck (and duck confit)

Pork

- Andouille—a spicy dry-smoked sausage, characterized by a coarse-ground texture
- Chaurice—similar to the Spanish chorizo
- Ham hocks
- Wild boar or feral hog
- Head cheese
- New Orleans hot sausage—a (usually) pork sausage spiced with cayenne and paprika.
- Pork sausage (fresh)—not smoked or cured, but highly seasoned. Mostly used in gumbos. The sausage itself does not include rice, separating it from boudin.
- Salt pork
- Cracklin'—tender pork rinds
  - Chicharron—Boiled skin which breaks the cells of collagen. Fat is scraped off and pieces are dehydrated. Deep fried for a "puffy" consistency.
  - Gratons—Skin on pork belly, cured similarly to bacon for up to a week, cooked in its own fat and dehydrated. Deep fried until tender.

Beef and dairy
Though parts of the Louisiana where Creole cooking is found are well suited to cattle or dairy farming, beef is not often used in a pre-processed or uniquely Creole form. It is usually prepared fairly simply as chops, stews, or steaks, taking a cue from Texas to the west. Ground beef is used as is traditional throughout the southern US, although seasoned differently.

Dairy farming is not as prevalent as in the past, but there are still some farms in the business. There are unique dairy items produced in Creole cooking such as Creole cream cheese.

Other game meats

- Alligator
- Alligator gar, or gator gar
- Frog, usually bullfrogs (not just the legs, but the entire creature)
- Gros bec—commonly called night heron
- Nutria
- Squirrel
- Rabbit
- Skunk, or mouffette
- Turtle
- Snake
- Virginia opossum, or sarigue

=== Creole seasonings ===
Individual

- Bay leaf
- Oregano
- Black pepper
- Cayenne pepper
- Garlic
- Green onion
- "Holy trinity" — bell pepper (green or red), onion, and celery used together
- Parsley, flat leaf
- Sassafras leaves—dried and ground into the spice known as filé for gumbo of the Choctaw
- Dried shrimp
- Sugarcane, also cane syrup, brown sugar and molasses
- Thyme

Blended

- "Creole spice" blends such as Tony Chachere's and REX King of Spice are sometimes used in Creole kitchens, but do not suit every cook's style because Creole-style seasoning is often achieved from scratch, even by taste.

Whole peppers are almost never used in authentic Creole dishes—ground cayenne, paprika, and pepper sauces predominate.

- Hot sauce
- Seafood boil mix
- Vinegar seasoned with small, pickled, hot green peppers is a common condiment with many Creole meals.
- Persillade
- Marinades made with olive oil, brown sugar, and citrus juices
- Various barbecue rubs similar to those in other states

Cooking bases

Knowing how to make a good roux is key to Cajun and Creole cooking. The technique was inherited from the French. A roux is "a mixture made from equal parts of fat and flour, used especially to make a sauce or soup thicker." The fat and flour are cooked together on the stovetop until the mixture reaches a certain level of brownness, or darkness.

Creole roux in New Orleans are known to be lighter than Cajun roux and are usually made with butter or bacon fat and flour. But certain Creole dishes use a dark roux.

Dark roux are usually made with oil or bacon fat and flour. The scent of a good roux is so strong that it stays in clothes until they are washed. The scent is so widely recognized in Louisiana that others can tell if someone is making a roux, and often infer that they're making a gumbo.

The secret to making a good gumbo is pairing the roux with the protein, similar to pairing the right wine and protein.

- Light roux: A light roux is well-suited for seafood dishes, because the roux will not overwhelm the subtle seafood flavors. A light-colored roux does not support the heavier meat flavor of meat-based gumbos. For a light roux, the flour is cooked to a light golden brown.
- Medium roux: Medium roux are the most versatile and probably the most common among the Creole cuisine of the New Orleans area. They work well with most Creole dishes. A medium roux will turn the color of a copper penny or peanut butter. A medium roux begins to take on the warm, browned flavor widely associated with gumbo.
- Dark roux: A dark roux, with its strong (dense) nutty flavor will completely overpower a simple seafood gumbo, but is the perfect complement to a gumbo using chicken, sausage, crawfish or alligator. Chicken will just settle into the darker flavor, while sausage and dark roux balance each other well. A dark roux is approximately the color of milk chocolate.

Preparing a dark roux is complicated. It involves heating oil or fat and flour very carefully, constantly stirring for 15–45 minutes (depending on the darkness desired), until the mixture has turned quite dark and developed a rich, nutty flavor and smell. It is very easy to burn the flour as it moves toward a darker brown, and burnt roux renders a dish unpalatable. A heavy-bottomed pot can help protect the roux from burning.

- Stocks: Creole stocks may be more heavily seasoned than Continental counterparts, and the shellfish stock sometimes made with shrimp and crawfish heads is unique to Creole cuisine.
  - Fish stock and court-bouillon
  - Shellfish stock
  - Chicken stock

== Creole dishes ==
=== Well-known dishes ===
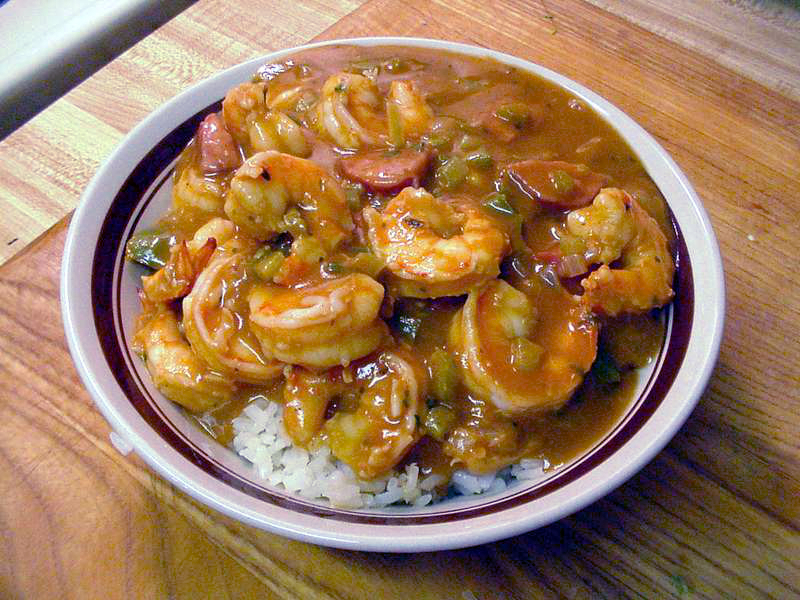
Seafood gumbo

Gumbo—Gumbo is the quintessential stew-like soup of Louisiana. The dish is a Louisiana version of West African okra soups which the dish gumbo is named for. The name gumbo is derived from the French term for okra, which entered Louisiana French from West African languages as gombo, from the West African kilogombo or quingombo.

Okra, often one of the principal ingredients in gumbo recipes, is used as a thickening agent and for its distinct flavor. In modern Louisiana cuisine, okra is not a requirement any longer, so gumbos can be made either with or without okra. Often gumbo that is not made with okra is made with a Louisiana spice called filé, made from ground sassafras leaves. Chicken gumbos are often made without okra and made with filé instead.

Tradition holds that a seafood gumbo is more common in summer months when okra is plentiful and a chicken or wild game gumbo in winter months when hunting is common. However, in modern times a variety of gumbo types have become commonplace year-round in Louisiana.

A filé gumbo is thickened with dried sassafras leaves after the stew has finished cooking, a practice borrowed from the Choctaw Indians. The backbone of a gumbo is roux of which there are two variations mainly used. A medium roux, or a dark roux, which is made of flour, toasted in fat or oil until well-browned.

Jambalaya—The only certain thing that can be said about a jambalaya is that it contains rice, some sort of meat (such as chicken or beef) or seafood (such as shrimp or crawfish) and almost anything else. Usually, however, one will find green peppers, onions, celery, tomatoes and hot chili peppers. Anything else is optional.

Jambalaya has its origins in several rice-based dishes well attested in the cuisines of West Africa, Spain, and southern France, especially in the West African dish jollof, the Spanish dish paella, and the Provençal French dish known as jambalaia. The dish evolved, going through a creolization of Louisiana influences. Jambalaya is a highly seasoned rice casserole.

Shrimp creole—Shrimp creole is a common feature of Creole cuisine in the greater New Orleans area. Its ingredients include shrimp, tomatoes, onion, bell pepper, celery, garlic and cayenne pepper. Classic shrimp creole does not contain a roux, but some cooks may add one. It is an early Creole dish of French and Spanish heritage.

Red beans and rice—Red beans and rice is one of the most common dishes found in New Orleans, cooked in homes and restaurants throughout the area. Red beans arrived with white French Creoles who escaped Haiti during the slave uprising and settled in New Orleans. Red bean stew has a strong Caribbean influence.

Rice and gravy—Rice and gravy dishes are a staple of Creole cuisine and usually include a brown gravy based on pan drippings, which are deglazed and simmered with extra seasonings and served over steamed or boiled rice. The dish is traditionally made from cheaper cuts of meat and cooked in a cast-iron pot, typically for an extended time to let the tough cuts of meat become tender. Beef, pork, chicken or game meats are used for its preparation. Common local varieties include hamburger steak, smothered rabbit, turkey necks, and chicken fricassee.

=== Food as an event ===
==== Crawfish boil ====
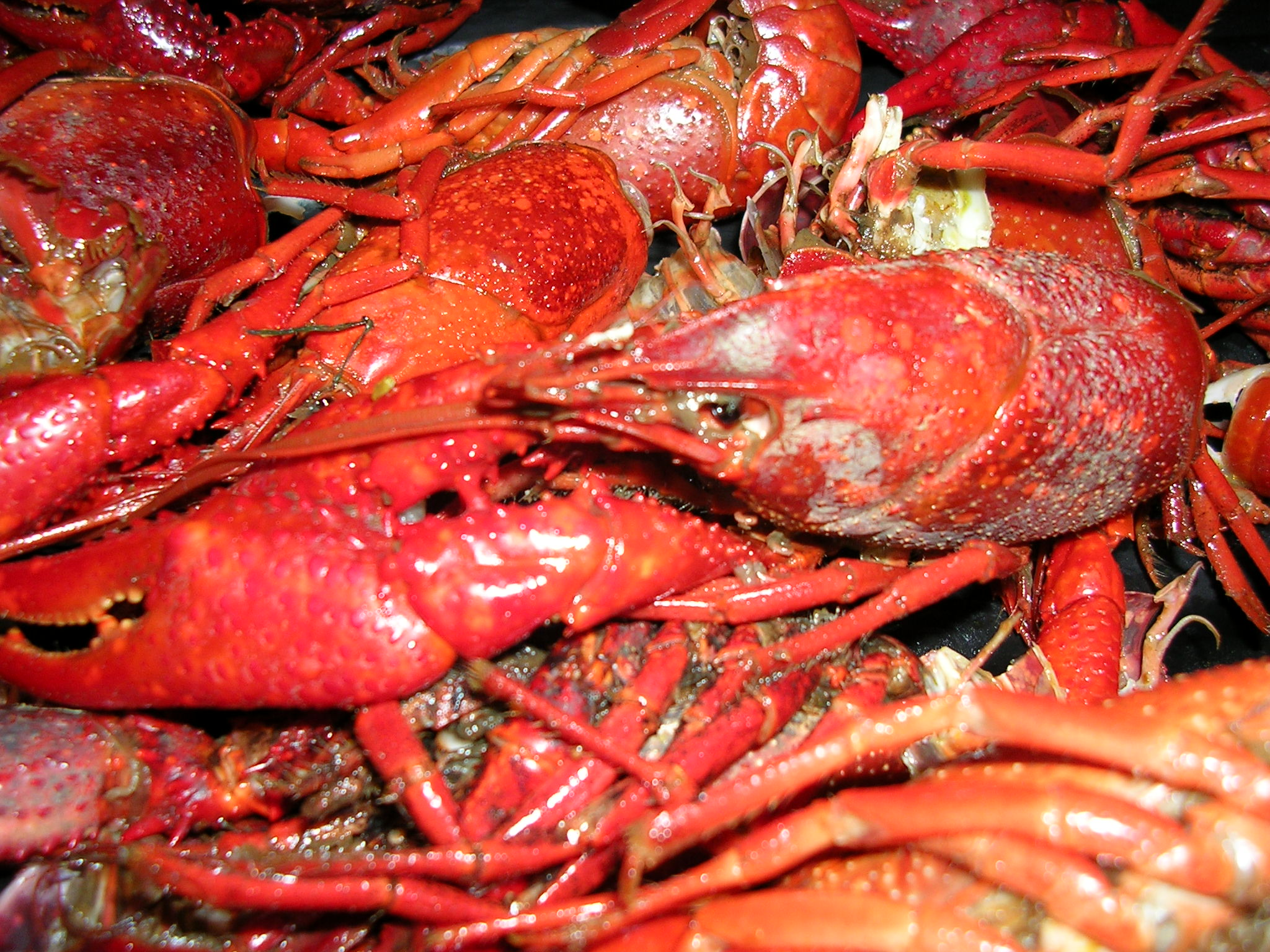
Louisiana-style crawfish boil

The crawfish boil is a celebratory event that involves boiling crawfish, potatoes, onions and corn in large pots over propane cookers. Although potatoes, onions and corn are the most frequently served side dishes, many boils include peppers, mushrooms, celery, ravioli, whole garlic cloves and sweet potatoes. The crawfish boil is an event central to both Creole and Cajun cuisines.

Lemons and small muslin bags containing a mixture of bay leaves, mustard seeds, cayenne pepper, and other spices commonly known as "crab boil" or "crawfish boil" are added to the water for seasoning. The results are then dumped onto large, newspaper-draped tables and in some areas covered in Creole spice blends, such as Rex, Zatarain's, Louisiana Fish Fry or Tony Chachere's. Cocktail sauce, mayonnaise and hot sauce are sometimes served as condiments.

The seafood is scooped onto large trays or plates and eaten by hand. During times when crawfish are not abundant, shrimp and crabs are prepared and served in the same manner. Attendees are encouraged to "suck the head" of a crawfish by separating the abdomen of the crustacean and sucking out the abdominal fat and juices. Often, newcomers to the crawfish boil, or those unfamiliar with the traditions, are jokingly warned "not to eat the dead ones". This comes from the common belief that when live crawfish are boiled, their tails curl beneath themselves, but when dead crawfish are boiled, their tails are straight and limp.

== See also ==
- Barbecue
- Cajun cuisine
- Canarian cuisine
- Cuisine of New Orleans
- Cuisine of the Southern United States

=== New Orleans Creole restaurants ===
- Antoine's
- Arnaud's
- Brennan's
- Broussard's
- Commander's Palace
- Dooky Chase's
- Galatoire's
- Hubig's New Orleans Style Pies
- Vaucresson's Creole Cafe & Deli

=== Notable Creole cooks and chefs ===
- Leah Chase
- Nellie Murray
- Paul Prudhomme
