= Grillades =

Louisiana Creole meat dish

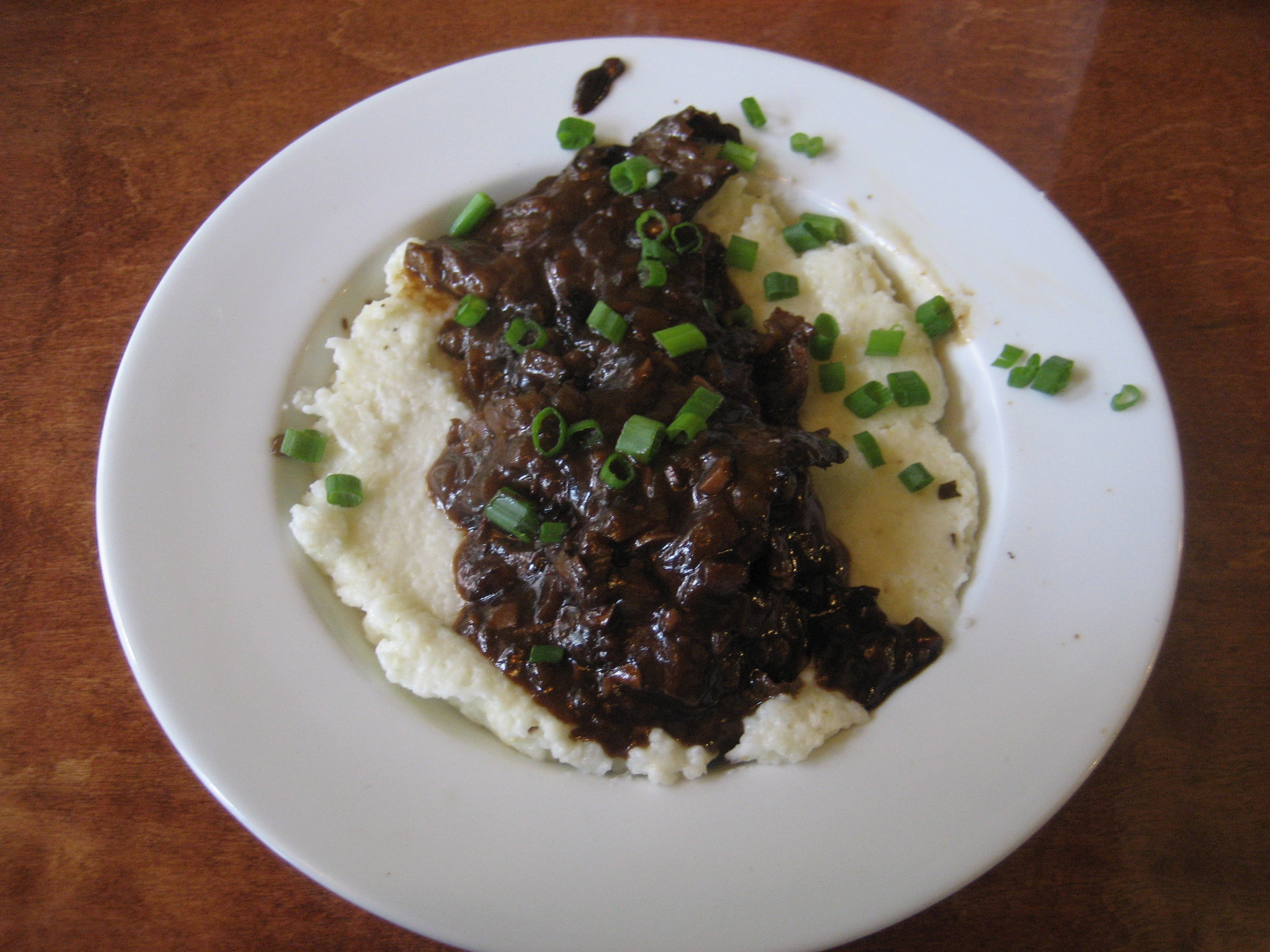
Grillades and grits topped with scallions at a New Orleans restaurant.

Grillades /ɡree-yahds/ are medallions of various meats, conventionally beef, but veal and pork are also used in modern recipes. Often served with gravy at breakfast or brunch over grits, they are a traditional Creole food.

Despite the name, grillades are not grilled, but fried or seared. For grillades with gravy, the meat is cut into medallions, pounded flat, seasoned and dredged in flour. The meat is then browned and braised in a flavorful liquid made up of roux and chopped or crushed tomatoes. The "trinity" (chopped bell pepper, onion and celery), garlic, beef broth and wine are called for in many recipes. Thyme, bay leaves and cayenne or hot sauce are common seasonings. The braising liquid is used as a gravy for the finished dish.

For ”grillades and grits”, the grillades are placed on a bed of grits, often cheese grits, and the gravy poured over both.

This dish is served in many restaurants in New Orleans.
