= Broussard's =

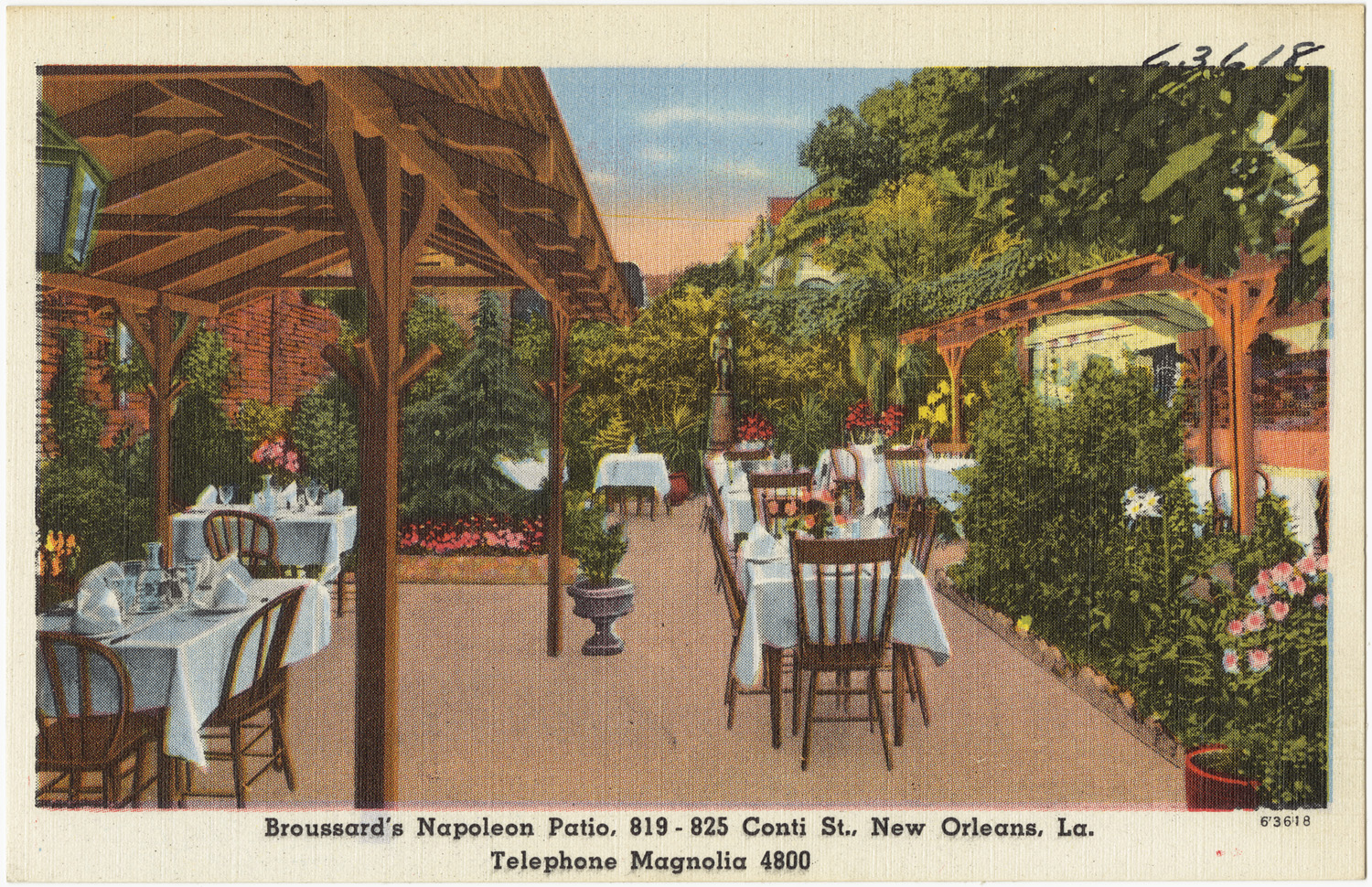
- Historical postcard of the Napoleon Patio at Boussard's
- Interactive map of Broussard's

Restaurant information
- Established: 1920; 106 years ago
- Owner: Creole Cuisine Restaurant Concepts.
- Head chef: Jimi Setchim
- Food type: French Creole cuisine
- Location: 819 Conti Street, French Quarter of New Orleans, Louisiana, United States
- Coordinates: 29.9566°N 90.0682°W
- Seating capacity: 380
- Reservations: Accepted
- Website: Official Site

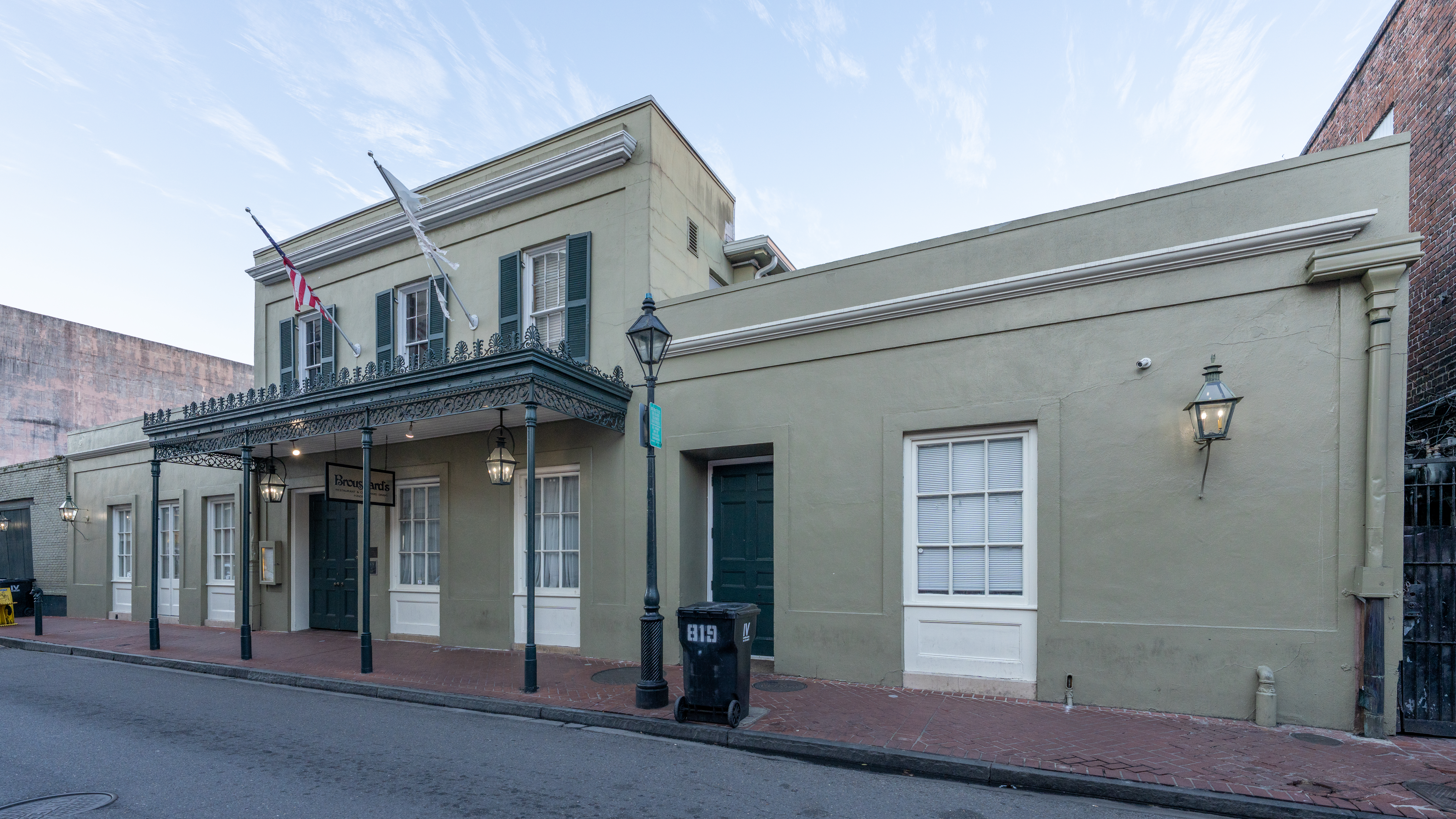
Exterior view of Broussard's (2026)

Broussard's, along with Galatoire's, Antoine's, and Arnaud's, is one of the four classic Creole New Orleans restaurants known as the Grand Dames.

Broussard's first opened in 1920, when an eminent local chef, Joseph Broussard, married Rosalie Borrello, and the couple moved into the Borrello family mansion (built in 1834) at 819 Conti Street in the French Quarter, where the restaurant now sits. Until their deaths, one month apart from each other in 1966, the Broussards resided in the apartment above the restaurant.

The restaurant was purchased from the Broussard family and underwent a major renovation in the early 1970s. It was owned and operated by Joseph Marcello and Joseph Segreto from 1975 to 1984, and Chef Gunter Preuss and family from 1984 to 2013. Broussards underwent another major renovation in 2013 when it was purchased from the Preuss family by Creole Cuisine Restaurant Concepts.

While the Napoleon (main) dining room was built in 1920, the adjoining dining rooms were constructed in 1831 and originally used as stables and slave quarters for the Hermann-Grima House, which now operates as a museum.

== See also ==
- List of Louisiana Creole restaurants
