= Louisiana Creole (disambiguation) =

Louisiana Creole can refer to:

- Louisiana Creole people
- Louisiana Creole language
- Louisiana Creole cuisine
