= Kleftiko =

Greek dish

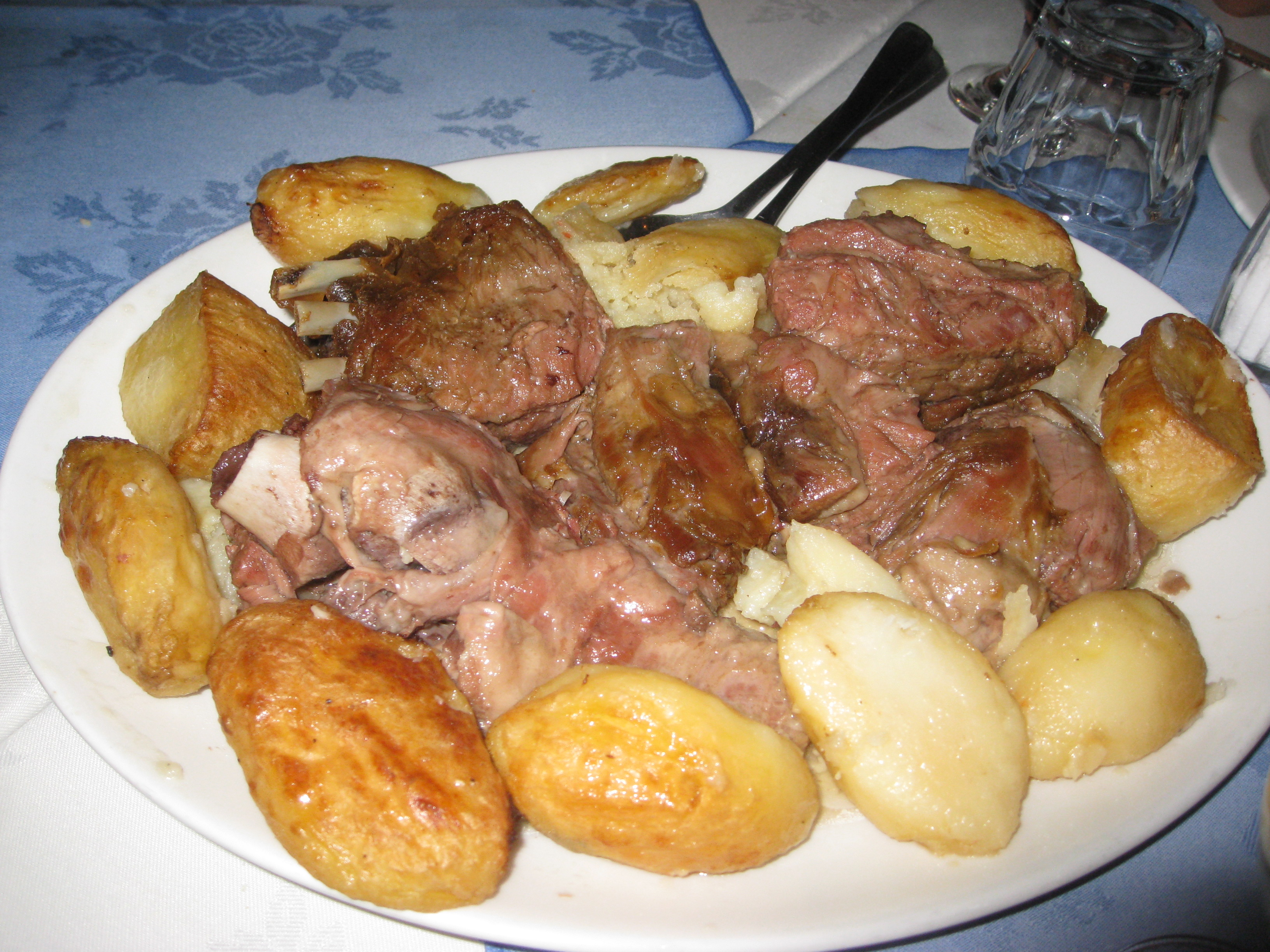
Kleftiko with potatoes

Kleftiko (Greek: κλέφτικο, pronounced [ˈkleftiko]) is a traditional Greek dish of slow-roasted marinated meat dish (traditionally lamb or goat, but also pork) most often cooked en papillote and served with potatoes. Bell peppers, onions, and cheese (usually kefalotyri) can also be added.

The name of the dish derives from klephts, who were a group of Greek guerrillas and outlaws during the period of Ottoman rule over Greece. Both words, kleftiko and klephts, are cognates with kleptomania and kleptocracy and are derived from the same old Greek root κλέπτω, meaning "to steal". The klephts cooked the meat on coals in a covered hole or underground pit to avoid detection. The current recipes describe kleftiko as lamb cooked in the oven wrapped in parchment paper.

Apart from mainland Greece, kleftiko is a very popular dish in the Greek diaspora and in Cyprus. in 2019, UNESCO included kleftiko in the register of Intangible Cultural Heritage of Cyprus.
