= Eggs Sardou =

Louisiana Creole dish

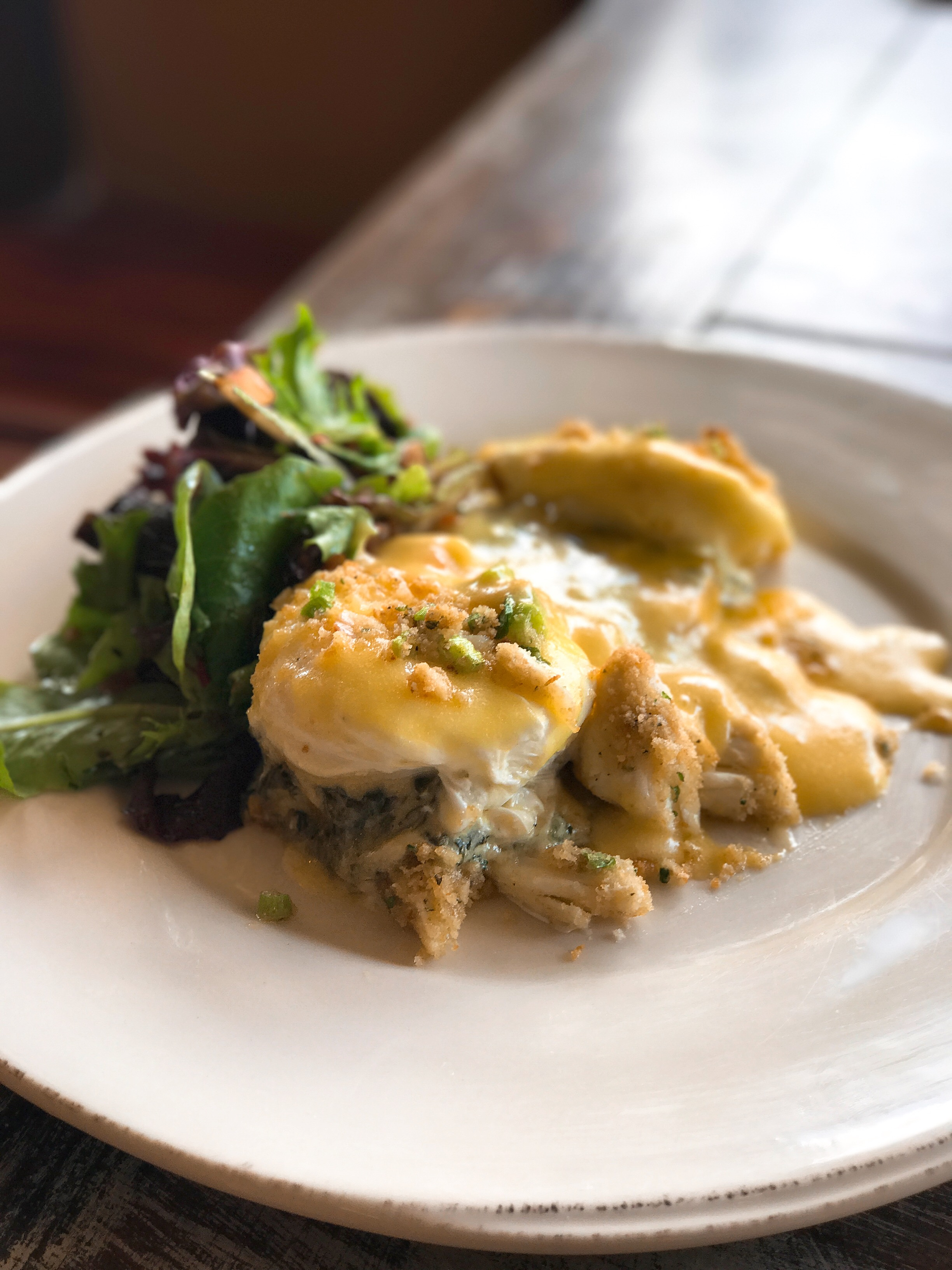
- Eggs Sardou at Red Dog Diner in New Orleans
- Place of origin: United States
- Region or state: Creole cuisine
- Main ingredients: poached eggs, artichoke bottoms, creamed spinach and Hollandaise sauce

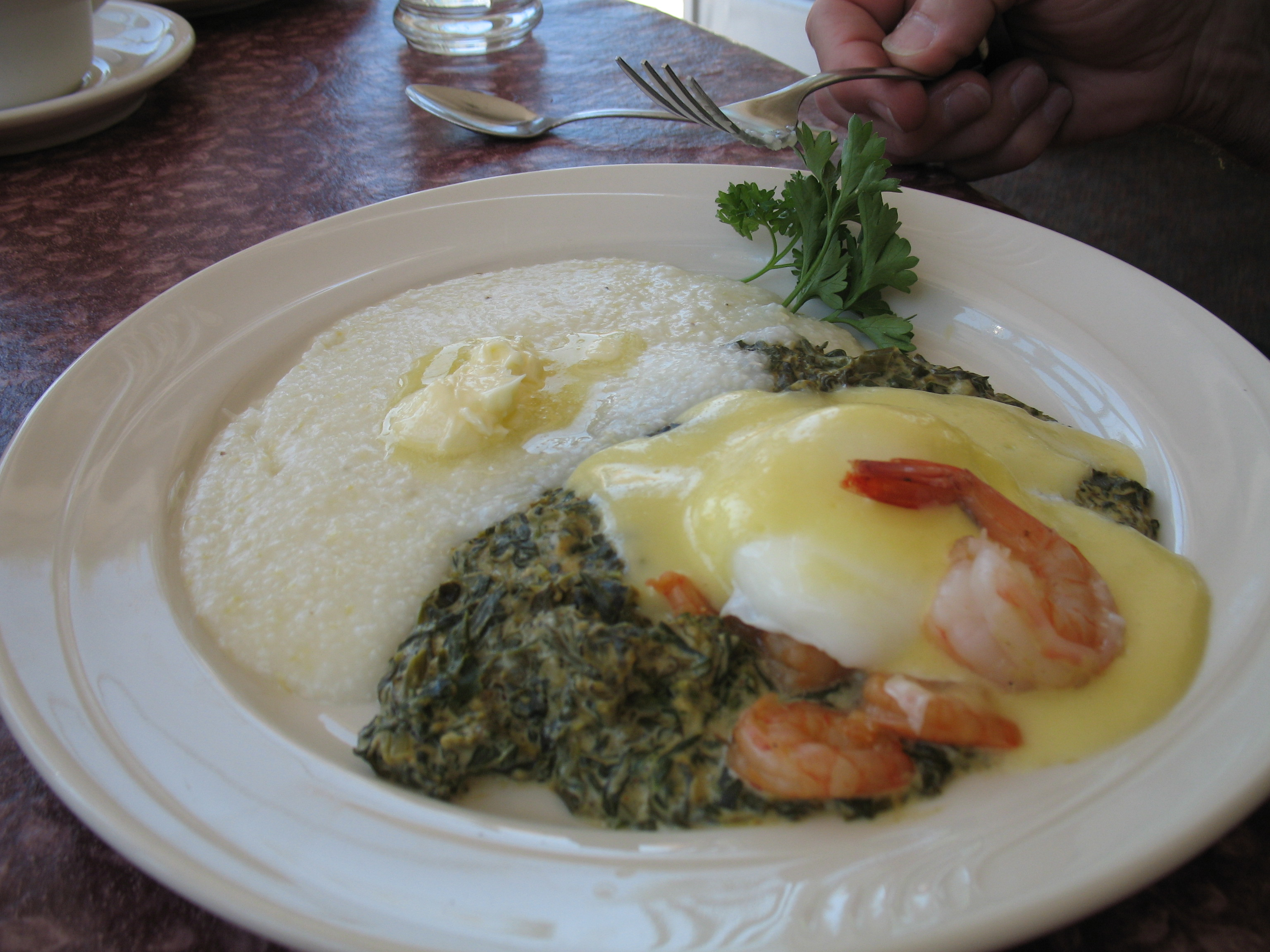
Eggs Sardou with shrimp and grits

Eggs Sardou is a Louisiana Creole cuisine dish made with poached eggs, artichoke bottoms, creamed spinach and Hollandaise sauce. It is on the menu of many Creole restaurants in New Orleans, including Antoine's, where eggs Sardou was invented, and at Brennan's. Eggs Sardou is named for Victorien Sardou, a famous French dramatist of the 19th century, who was a guest in New Orleans when the dish was invented around the turn of the century (from 19th to 20th).

An example of an eggs sardou recipe includes poached eggs, artichoke hearts, creamed spinach, and hollandaise sauce. Eggs Sardou is related to the famous eggs Benedict, and is considered one of the many variations of that recipe in most cases omitting Canadian bacon and English muffin, and adding artichoke hearts and creamed spinach.

== Preparation ==
Cooked fresh spinach is creamed with a bechamel sauce, a drop or two of Tabasco sauce is added, and pre-cut artichoke bottoms are warmed in a 175 °F (79 °C) oven for five to ten minutes. The eggs Sardou are assembled by placing spoonfuls of the warm creamed spinach on a warmed plate. The artichoke bottoms are placed on top of the creamed spinach and the poached eggs are set inside the artichoke bottoms. The assembly is then covered in the Hollandaise sauce. Some cooks omit nutmeg and cloves from the bechamel sauce when using it to cream spinach for eggs Sardou. Eggs Sardou can also be served with truffles, ham, and anchovies.

== Serving ==
Eggs Sardou should be served at once, while the spinach, artichokes, poached eggs and Hollandaise sauce are still warm. For this reason, a warmed plate or bowl is recommended in most recipes. The garnish, if any, should be something of a color that contrasts well with the yellow Hollandaise sauce that tops the dish. This may be anything from crumbled bacon or a small dice of ham to a simple sprinkle of paprika. If served as an appetizer course, no side dishes are needed. If served at brunch, or as an entree, the side dishes should be such that they do not overpower the muted, carefully blended flavors of the eggs, spinach, and sauce. If wine is to be served, it should be white, preferably a slightly sweet white wine.

== See also ==
- Eggs Benedict
- List of brunch foods
- Lobster thermidor (another dish created to honor Sardou)
