= En papillote =

Food baked in a parchment paper or foil pouch

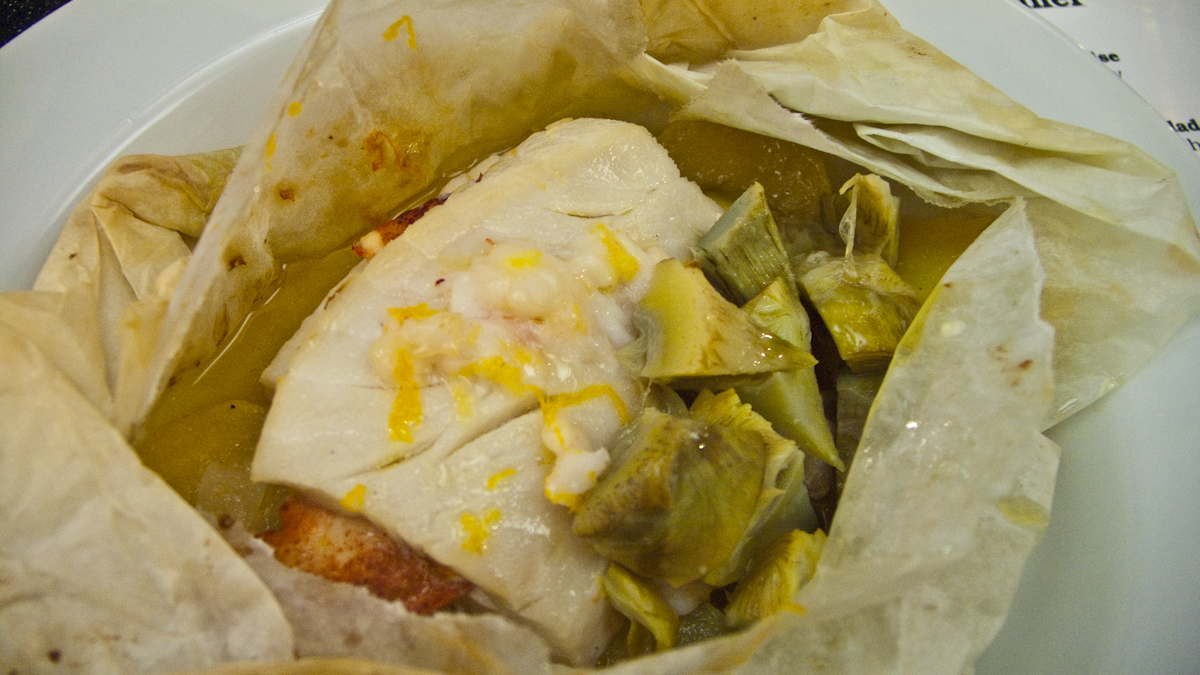
Black cod en papillote

En papillote (French pronunciation: [ɑ̃ papijɔt]; French for "enveloped in paper"), or al cartoccio in Italian, is a method of cooking in which the food is put into a folded pouch or parcel and then baked. This method is most often used to cook fish or vegetables, but lamb and poultry can also be cooked en papillote. It is a combination cooking method of baking and steaming. This method of cooking has been popular since the 17th century in France.

== Method ==
The parcel is typically made from folded parchment paper, but other material, such as a paper bag or aluminum foil, may be used. The parcel holds in moisture to steam the food. The pocket is created by overlapping circles of paper or foil and folding them tightly around the food to create a seal.

The moisture may be from the food itself or from an added moisture source, such as water, wine, or stock. The choice of herbs, seasonings and spices depends on the particular recipe being prepared.

The parcel can be opened at the table to allow people to smell the aroma when it opens.

== Regional and local variations ==
=== Asia ===
Indonesian cuisine has a variation on en papillote using leaves to steam food. With large leaves (e.g. banana, Xanthosoma, or cassava) widely available across the archipelago, Indonesians have long used them in food preparation. The leaves are used to wrap food before cooking it either by steaming or grilling. The Indonesian method requires no additional moisture, and in some dishes, the leaf wrappings may also be eaten. Popular Indonesian dishes that employ this cooking method include pepes, botok, buntil, and otak-otak (variations of this dish are also commonly available in neighboring Singapore and Malaysia).

A Japanese variant called foil yaku or hoiru yaku (ホイル焼き), which consists of using aluminium foil to both cook and serve. Commonly Mushrooms, onion and fish, seasoned with butter, miso and soy-sauce.

Chinese beggar's chicken is encased in mud or clay before being heated directly on a fire. The legend surrounding its origination was to prevent any aroma from escaping while it was being cooked.

=== New Orleans ===
Pompano en papillote, pompano fish baked en papillote with vegetables and shrimp, crab or oyster meat, is a specialty of Louisiana Creole cuisine. It was invented at Antoine's Restaurant in New Orleans.

=== Greece ===
The Greek dish Kleftiko is prepared by slow-braising meat and potatoes in a paper parcel.

== See also ==
- Tamale
- Zongzi
