= Oysters Rockefeller =

Type of oyster dish

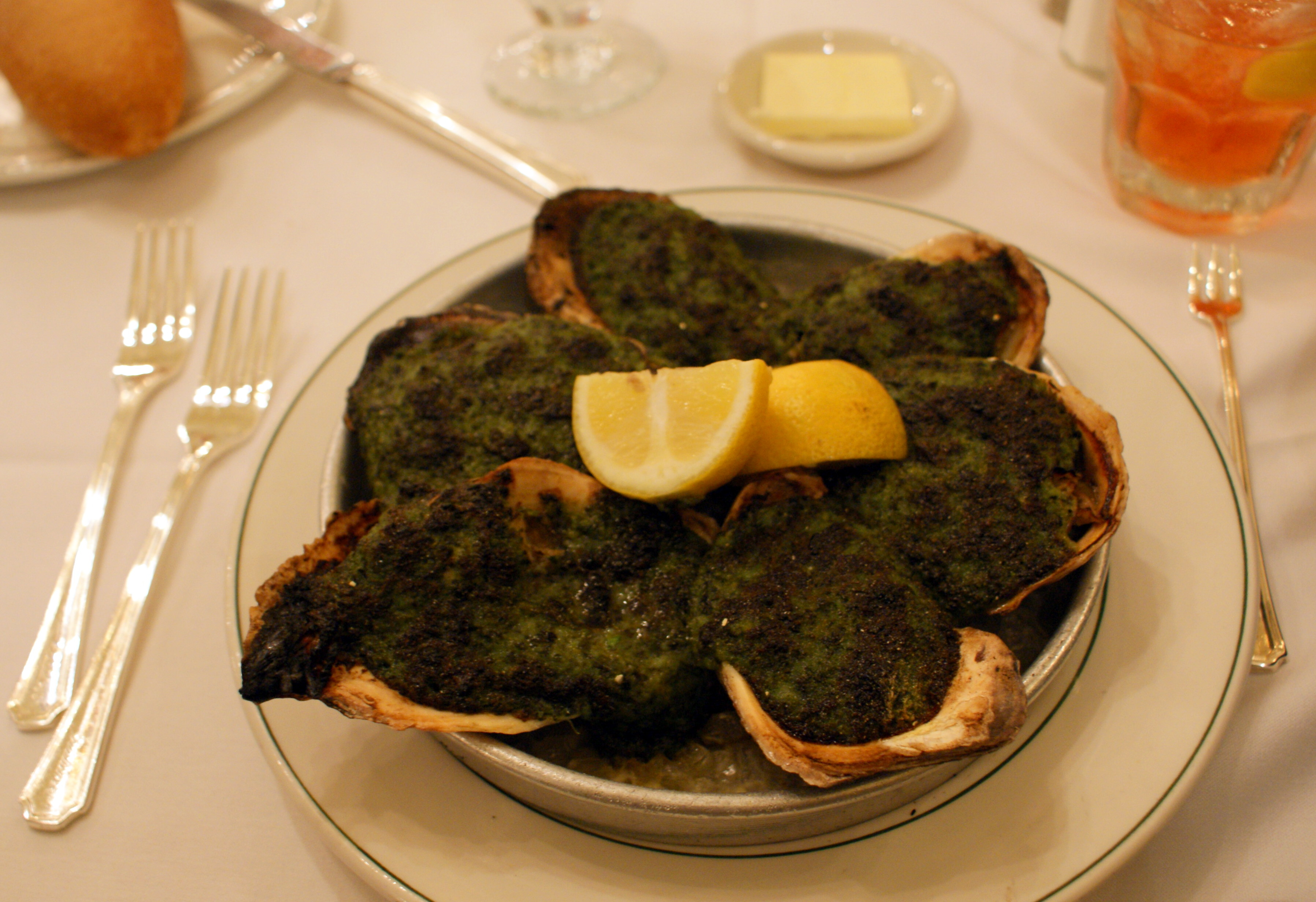
- Course: Hors d'oeuvre, entrée
- Place of origin: United States
- Region or state: New Orleans
- Main ingredients: Oysters

Oysters Rockefeller is a dish consisting of oysters on the half-shell that have been topped with a rich sauce of butter, parsley and other green herbs, bread crumbs, and then baked or broiled. Lemon wedges are the typical garnish. Many contemporary adaptations use diced oysters instead of whole. Also, diced bacon often appears as a non-traditional topping in addition to or in place of the sauce.

Oysters Rockefeller was created in 1889 in New Orleans. It is a popular restaurant appetizer throughout the United States and is served as a brunch item in the South.

== History ==
Oysters Rockefeller was created in 1889 at the New Orleans restaurant Antoine's by Jules Alciatore, son of founder Antoine Alciatore. Jules developed the dish due to a shortage of escargot, substituting the locally available oysters. The restaurant's recipe remains unchanged, with an estimated three and a half million orders having been served by 1980.

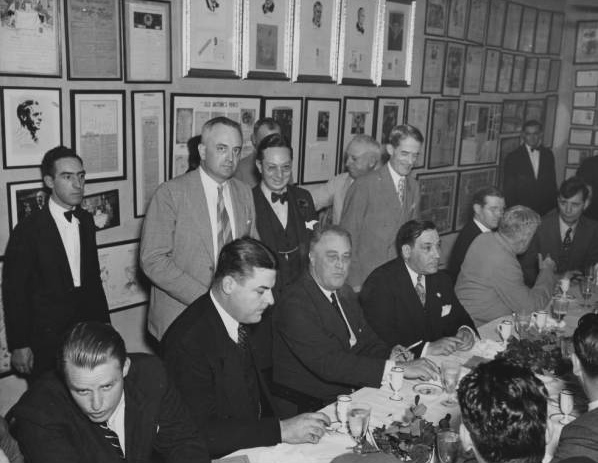
President Franklin Delano Roosevelt had oysters Rockefeller at Antoine's in 1937. Mayor Robert Maestri commented to Roosevelt "How you like dem erstas?", as the national press transcribed Maestri's Yat accent.

The dish was named "oysters Rockefeller" after John D. Rockefeller, the then-wealthiest American, for its extreme richness. It consists of oysters on the half-shell topped with a green sauce and bread crumbs, then baked or broiled. Though the original sauce recipe is a secret, it includes a purée of a number of green vegetables that may include spinach. Similar versions of the dish have proliferated in New Orleans, with none noted as an accurate duplicate.

Chef Alton Brown states in the "Shell Game" episode of his Food Network series Good Eats that Alciatore took his recipe to the grave and any version since is merely an assumption. While many achieve the sauce's trademark green color simply using spinach, Antoine's chefs have repeatedly denied the dish contains it. A 1986 laboratory analysis by William Poundstone in Bigger Secrets indicated its primary ingredients were parsley, pureed and strained celery, scallions or chives (indistinguishable in a food lab), olive oil, and capers.

== Gallery ==
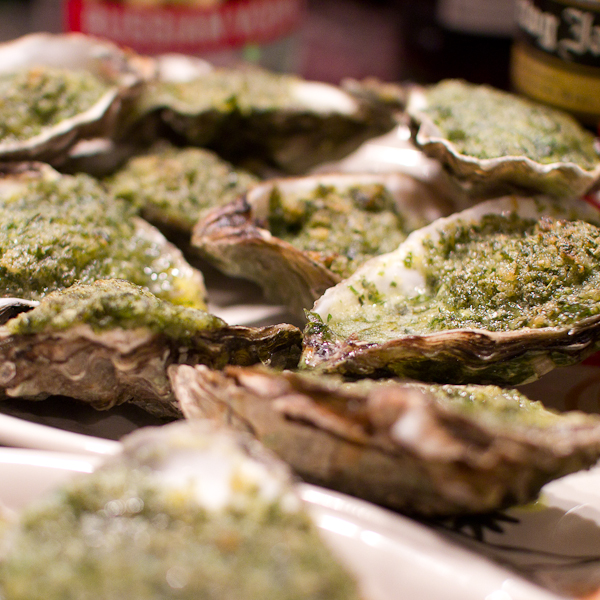
Oysters Rockefeller

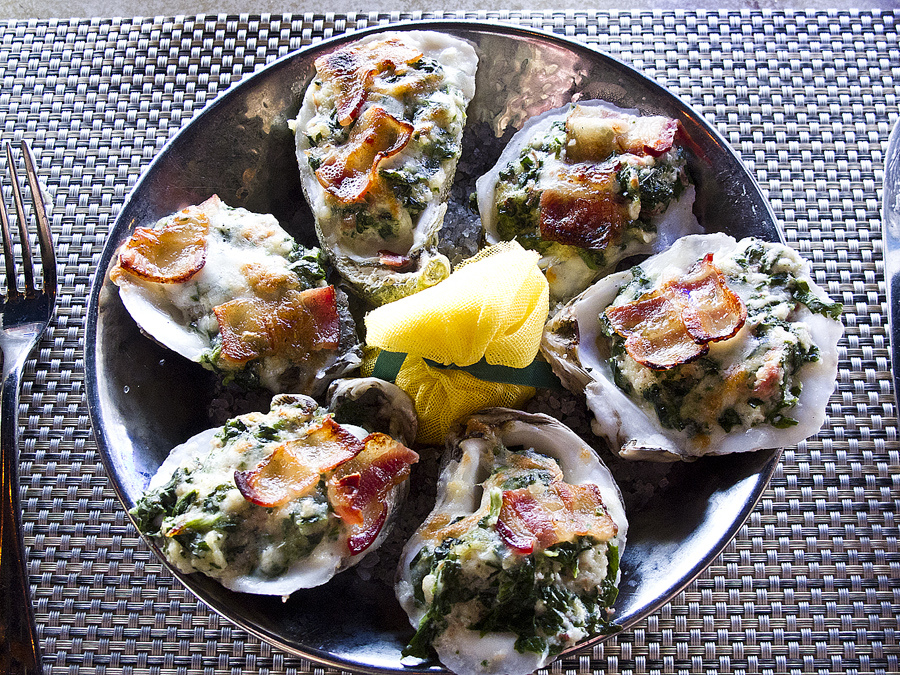
Oysters Rockefeller topped with bacon

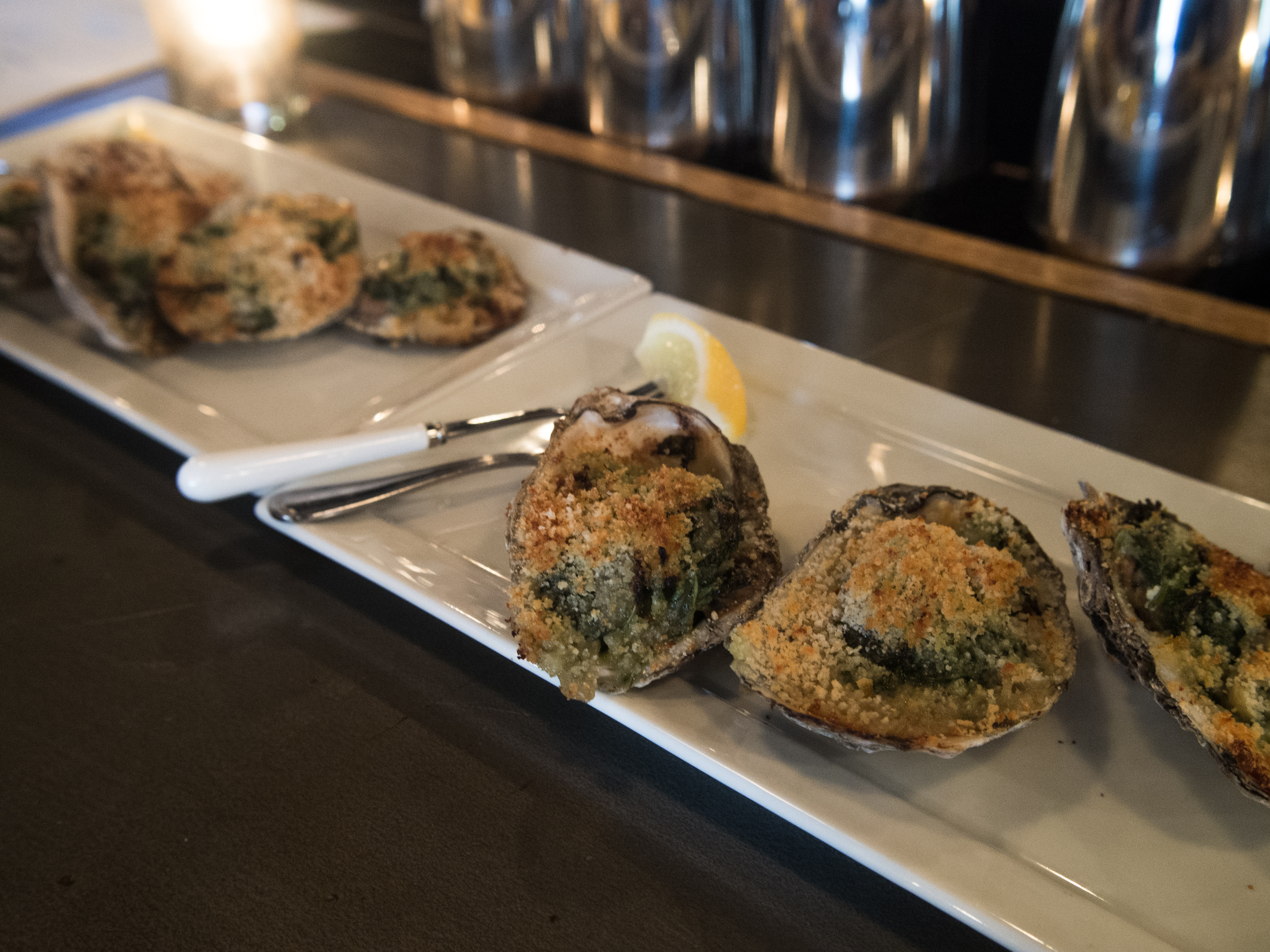
Oysters Rockefeller heavily broiled

== See also ==
- Clams casino
- Cuisine of New Orleans
- List of seafood dishes
