= Gâteau de sirop =

Gâteau de sirop is a syrup cake in Cajun cuisine. It is made with cane syrup.

== See also ==
- Basbousa
