= Nellie Murray =

American chef

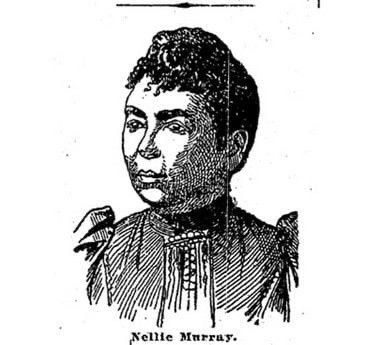
Nellie Murray in 1894

Nellie Murray (c. 1835-1918) was a caterer specializing in Creole cuisine who was born in a family held as slaves in New Orleans and became internationally recognized after her appearance cooking at the 1893 Chicago World Fair.

== Early life ==
Murray was born in about 1835 to parents held as slaves by Paul Octave Hébert, who would later be governor of Louisiana. Her mother and grandmother were both cooks living on Hébert's Bayou Goula plantation, and Murray learned to cook from them.

== Career and impact ==
After Reconstruction Murray created a catering business serving the elite of New Orleans.

Murray gained celebrity status after she served as Chef de Cuisine at the Louisiana Mansion Club at the 1893 Chicago World Fair. The Times-Democrat, referring to her appearance there, called her "the celebrated cook". According to historian Zella Palmer of Dillard University, as a result of her work at the fair, Murray "became an instant celebrity and society ladies in Chicago, New York, Paris and New Orleans booked her months in advance."

The Daily Picayune in 1894 wrote, "Do you know Nellie Murray? To admit that you do not is confession that you are not a member of the New Orleans Four Hundred." The paper called her the "Queen of New Orleans Creole Cuisine". She made a world tour in the late 19th century.

According to Palmer, by the time of her death Murray had "gained legendary status worldwide". Palmer called Murray "the most famed caterer of elite New Orleans society".

Murray spoke out against the New Orleans laws segregating street cars.

== Personal life ==
The 1890 census lists Murray as living on Polymnia Street. She lived for varying lengths of time in Berlin, Bucharest, Paris, Rome, and Vienna.

Murray had children. She died in 1918 at the age of 82.
