= Antoine's =

Historic restaurant in New Orleans, Louisiana, US

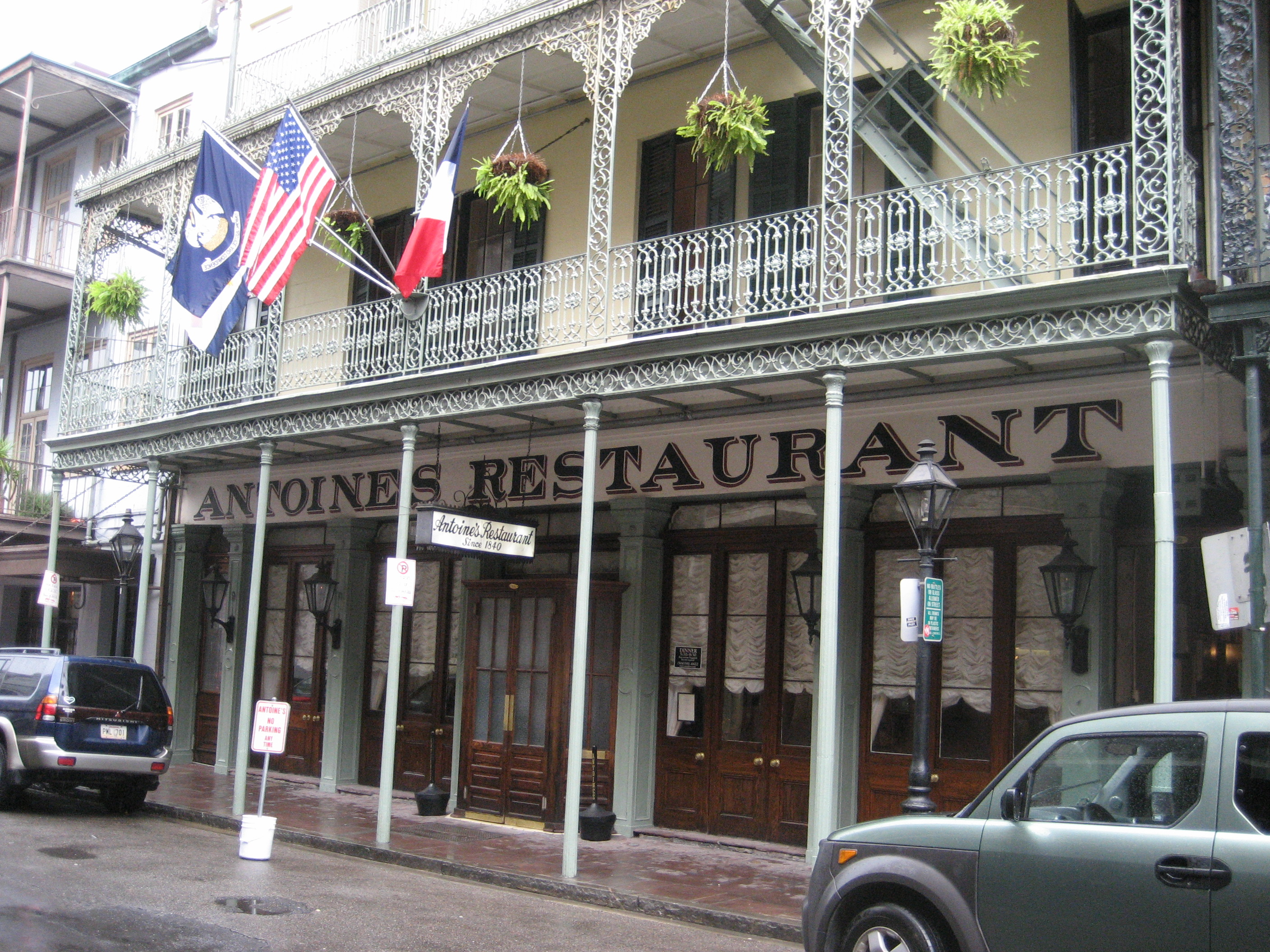
- Antoine's Restaurant in 2007
- Interactive map of Antoine's

Restaurant information
- Established: 3 April 1840
- Food type: Louisiana Creole cuisine
- Location: 713 Rue St. Louis (St. Louis Street), New Orleans, Louisiana, United States
- Coordinates: 29.9567°N 90.0666°W
- Website: antoines.com

Antoine's is a Louisiana Creole cuisine restaurant located in the French Quarter of New Orleans, Louisiana, United States. It is one of the oldest family-run restaurants in the United States, having been established in 1840 by Antoine Alciatore. A New Orleans institution, it is the birthplace of several famous dishes, such as oysters Rockefeller, pompano en papillote, eggs Sardou and pigeonneaux paradis. Antoine's Cookbook, compiled by the fifth-generation proprietor Roy F. Guste features hundreds of recipes from the Antoine's tradition. It is also known for its VIP patrons including several U.S. presidents and Pope John Paul II.

Antoine's features a 25,000 bottle capacity wine storage and 15 dining rooms of varying sizes and themes, with several featuring Mardi Gras krewe memorabilia. The menu features classic French-Creole dishes. By tradition, it's closed to the general public on Thanksgiving, Christmas, and Mardi Gras, though it can be reserved for private parties. As of March 2020, the executive chef was Rich Lee.

== Ownership and management ==
Management	Date
Antoine Alciatore	1840–1875
Julie Freyss Alciatore	1875–1887
Jules Alciatore	1887–1934
Roy Alciatore	1934–1972
William J. Guste and Roy Guste	1972–1975
Roy Guste Jr.	1975–1984
Bernard “Randy” Guste	1985–2004
Rick Blount	2005–present

Antoine's was founded by Antoine Alciatore in 1840 and run by him until 1875. After his death at the age of 55, Julie Freyss Alciatore, his wife, took over while their son Jules Alciatore got culinary training in France. Upon his return in 1887, he took control of the restaurant until 1934. During this time, Jules also acquired property around the original restaurant as it became available, including a former slave quarters and carriage house. Antoine's eventually could accommodate 800 people in its 15 dining rooms. Each dining room was decorated according to a theme, many of the themes referencing a Mardi Gras krewe, such as Rex, Proteus, Twelfth Night or Maison Verte. Later, his son, Roy Alciatore, took over until 1972. After Roy's death, William J. Guste and Roy Guste, both Antoine Alciatore's great-grandchildren, took over for a brief three years before appointing Roy Guste Jr., who managed the restaurant until 1984. For the next twenty years, between 1985 and 2004, the restaurant would be managed by Bernard "Randy" Guste, Roy Guste Jr.'s cousin. Rick Blount, son of Yvonne Alciatore Blount who is Roy's daughter, was brought in as owner and manager in 2005 as an attempt to save the restaurant from a critical economic state. Under his management, the restaurant recovered after Hurricane Katrina. He saw to many renovations in its infrastructure, as well as menu changes and changes in the dining rooms.

Judy Williamson of The Dallas Morning News wrote in 1984 that waitstaff were often discourteous to people not from New Orleans and people from the city who had not formed relationships with them, but "If you can overlook these things, you will be rewarded."

== Cuisine ==
The current owner, Rick Blount, describes Antoine's food as "Haute Creole", characterized as innovative and sophisticated Creole cooking with strong French traditions. The restaurant has a non-seasonal à-la-carte menu that features dishes with regional influences such as turtle, pompano, redfish, and shellfish, with preparation techniques that reflect a French aesthetic. Throughout its history and changing menus, Antoine's has had very little Cajun influence, and featured no Italian foods.

Pompano en papillote, a specialty of Louisiana Creole cuisine, was invented at Antoine's.

== Unique facilities ==
Cellars are not practical in New Orleans because the water table is very high. Therefore, Antoine's has what is best described as a "wine alley", a corridor 165 feet (50 m) long, lined by wine racks and carefully air-conditioned. Guests who are present at closing time are sometimes offered a tour of Antoine's, which includes the 15 dining rooms and many display cases full of Antoine's memorabilia.

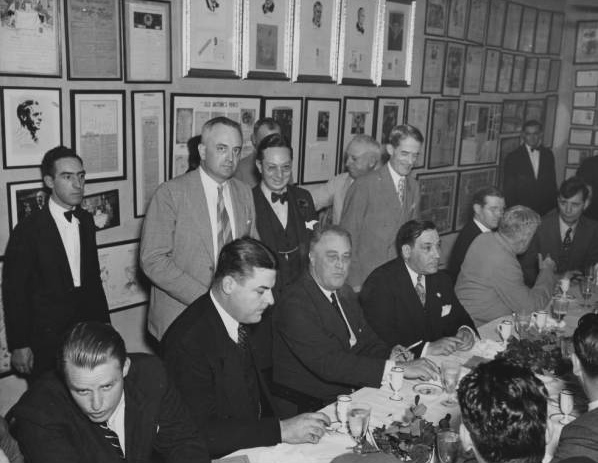
President Franklin D. Roosevelt had Oysters Rockefeller at Antoine's in 1937. Mayor Robert Maestri commented to Roosevelt "How you like dem erstas?", as the national press transcribed Maestri's Yat accent.

== Café Brûlot ==
Antoine's is also known for Café Brûlot, a drink made from coffee, orange liqueur, cinnamon stick, sugar, cloves, and lemon peels. At Antoine's, the coffee is customarily flamed when it is served as part of a dessert course.

== Trivia ==
During Prohibition, Antoine's served alcohol in coffee cups that were carried through the ladies' restroom into the Mystery Room, one of the themed dining rooms.

The restaurant closed the Japanese Room at the beginning of World War II. It remained closed for 43 years.

Antoine's requires all aspiring servers to spend two to three years in its apprentice program before they "make waiter".

== In media ==
=== The book Dinner at Antoine's ===
Dinner at Antoine's, a 1948 murder mystery by Frances Parkinson Keyes, begins with a dinner party in the 1840 Room and includes another dinner party at Antoine's near the end. Antoine's itself is not pivotal to the plot, which hinges on the murder of a woman from a snobbish-but-impoverished old Creole family, just as she was beginning to face a serious chronic illness. Rather, Antoine's is part of the ambience of New Orleans, which Keyes depicts as an exotic, half-foreign city whose ways are not easily understood by outsiders, especially those from the North. The novel is notable for its use of the "least likely person" motif in revealing the identity of the murderer, and for a final plot twist that renders the murder and its aftermath even more tragic. Antoine's is mentioned in other novels by Keyes, including Once on Esplanade, Crescent Carnival, The River Road, and its sequel, Vail D'Alvery. Dinner at Antoine's was Keyes's best-selling and best-known book.

=== Films ===
In the 1951 Bugs Bunny cartoon French Rarebit, a reference to Antoine's plays a pivotal role, as Bugs convinces two Parisian chefs to let him show them how to cook "Louisiana Back-Bay Bayou Bunny Bordelaise", exclusively because it is "a la Antoine". "Antoine of New Orleans?" the first chef asks, awestruck. Bugs retorts, "Well, I sure don't mean Antoine of Flatbush!"

In the film Apocalypse Now, Chef (Frederic Forrest), a character from New Orleans, briefly mentions it.

Antoine's was used for the filming of two sequences in Oliver Stone's 1991 movie, JFK. The first, which is quite brief, shows the Garrison family waiting for their father in the mirrored Main Dining Room. In the second, which lasts several minutes, Jim Garrison (played by Kevin Costner) has lunch with his staff in the Large Annex Room. At the beginning of the segment, he is greeted by the real maitre d'hôtel, Henri Alciatore, a direct descendant of the founder.

== Hurricane Katrina ==
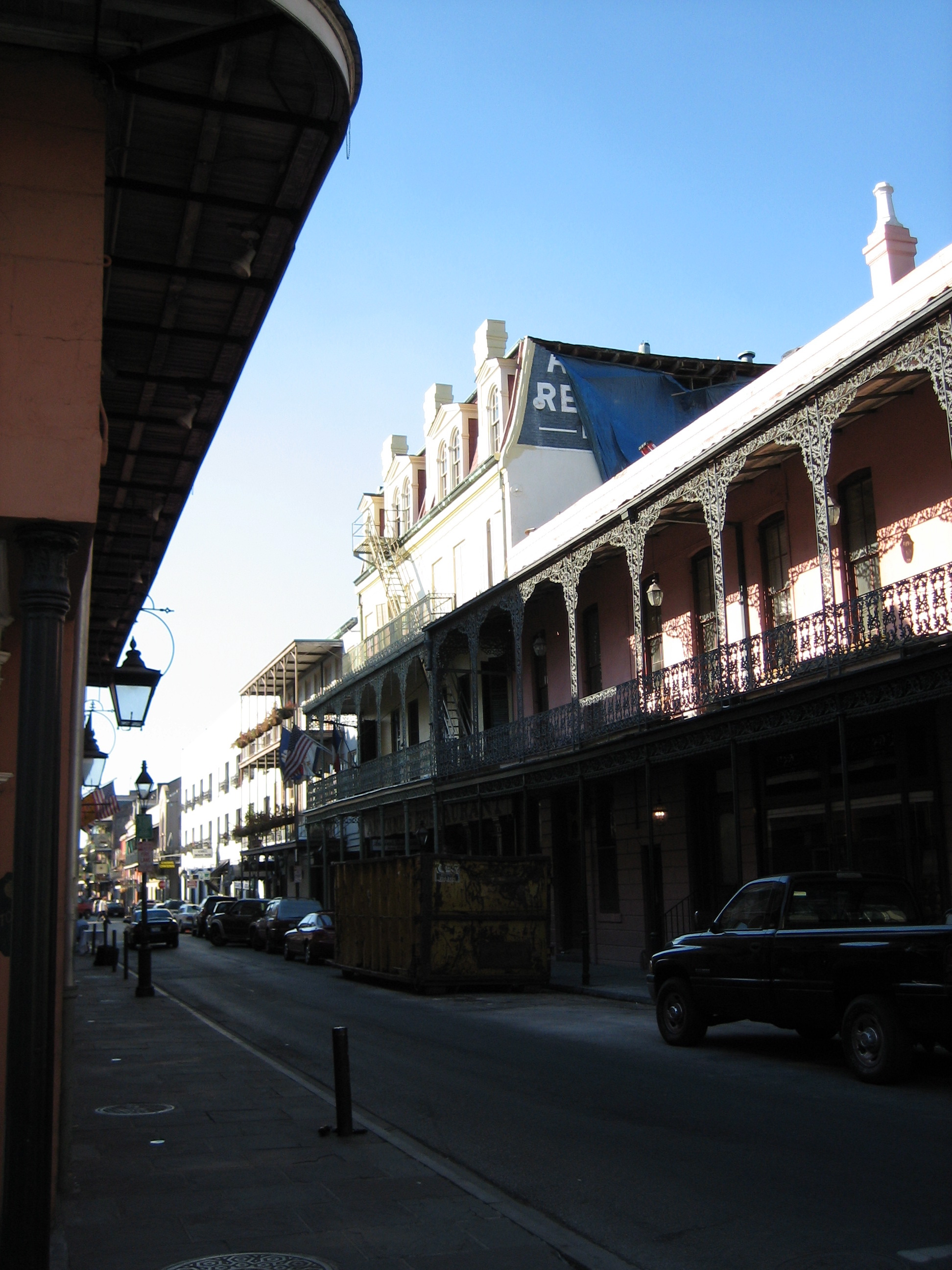
A tarp over damaged wall of Antoine's, October 2005

The French Quarter was above the flooding that devastated the majority of New Orleans in the aftermath of Hurricane Katrina in 2005 (see: Effects of Hurricane Katrina in New Orleans), but Antoine's suffered from the hurricane winds which damaged part of the roof and knocked down a section of exterior wall. The extensive contents of Antoine's wine cellar were also lost due to a failure in the climate-control system; as of June 2006, the cellar is slowly being replenished, $10,000 per week being devoted to new purchases. The restaurant was able to reopen on December 29, 2005. In the wake of Katrina, Antoine's has added its first-ever Sunday Jazz Brunch program. Two years after Katrina, the restaurant nearly declared bankruptcy due to zero customer base but managed to hold on. It is currently one of the best restaurants in New Orleans in terms of revenue and customer patronage.

== Famous dishes ==
- Oysters Rockefeller
- Pompano en Papillote
- Beef Robespierre
- Toast St. Antoine
- Toast Balthazar
- Pompano Montgolfier
- Crawfish & Artichoke Gratinée
- Filet of Sole Joinville
- Filet of Beef Périgueux
- Bouchées à la Reine
- Becassine sur Canapé
- Oysters Bienville
- Oysters à la Ellis
- Oysters à la Foch
- Tomates à la Jules César
- Sole Marguery
- Trout Meunière
- Eggs Sardou
- Bouillabaisse à la Marseillaise
- Chicken Rochambeau
- Tripes à la mode de Caen
- Onion soup gratinée
- Escargots à la Bordelaise

There was a set of three oyster plates, 2-3-2, which, as of 1984, was not on the menu.

== See also ==
- List of Louisiana Creole restaurants
- List of the oldest restaurants in the United States
