= Jambalaya =

Rice dish with meat and vegetables

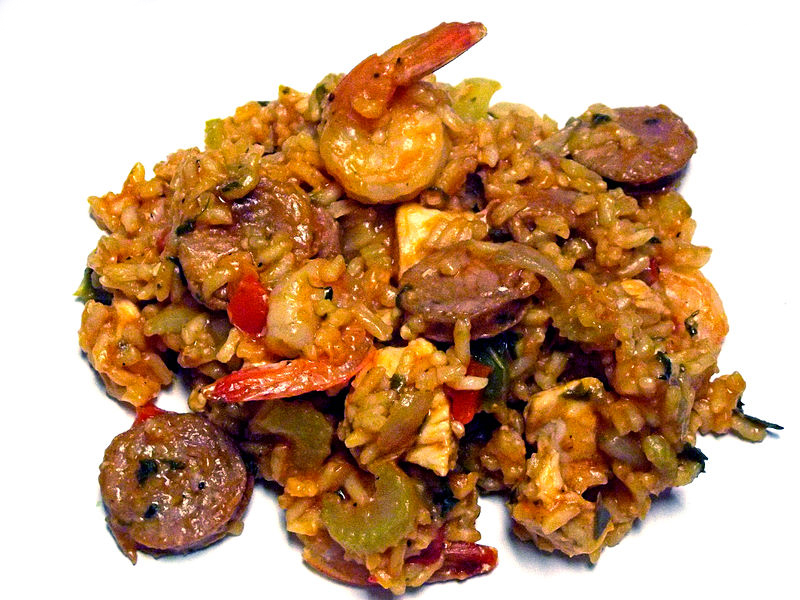
- Jambalaya with chicken, andouille sausage, rice, shrimp, celery and spices
- Alternative names: "Jumbled", "Mixed up"
- Type: Rice
- Place of origin: United States
- Region or state: Louisiana
- Main ingredients: Meats, vegetables, stock, rice, seasoning

Jambalaya (/ˌdʒæmbəˈlaɪə/ JAM-bə-LY-ə, /ˌdʒʌm-/ JUM-) is a savory rice dish that developed in the U.S. state of Louisiana fusing together African, Spanish, and French influences, consisting mainly of meat and/or seafood, and vegetables mixed with rice and spices. West Africans and Spanish people each had versions of jambalaya in their respective countries. The tomato, a mainstay ingredient of the dish, was introduced to West Africans by the French and was subsequently incorporated into their one-pot rice dishes. Spanish people made paella, which is also a one-pot rice dish cooked with meats and vegetables. These styles of cuisines blended in Louisiana and resulted in cultural and regional variations of the dish.

== Etymology ==
The Oxford English Dictionary indicates that jambalaya comes from the Provençal word jambalaia, meaning a mish mash, or mixup, and also meaning a pilaf (pilau) of rice. This is supported by the fact that the first printed appearance of the word is in a Provençal poem published in 1837.

A folk etymology of the word suggests that it is the fusion of two Spanish words: jamón ("ham") + paella (a rice dish). However, the evidence for this idea is thin. Ham is not a featured element of the dish, and Spanish speakers would call a ham paella paella con jamón, not jamón paella.

Another history, per Louisiana chef John Folse, author of The Encyclopedia of Cajun & Creole Cuisine (2004), is that jambalaya is a contraction of jambon à la yaya, meaning "ham with rice", from French jambon and Yoruba yaya.

== Origins ==
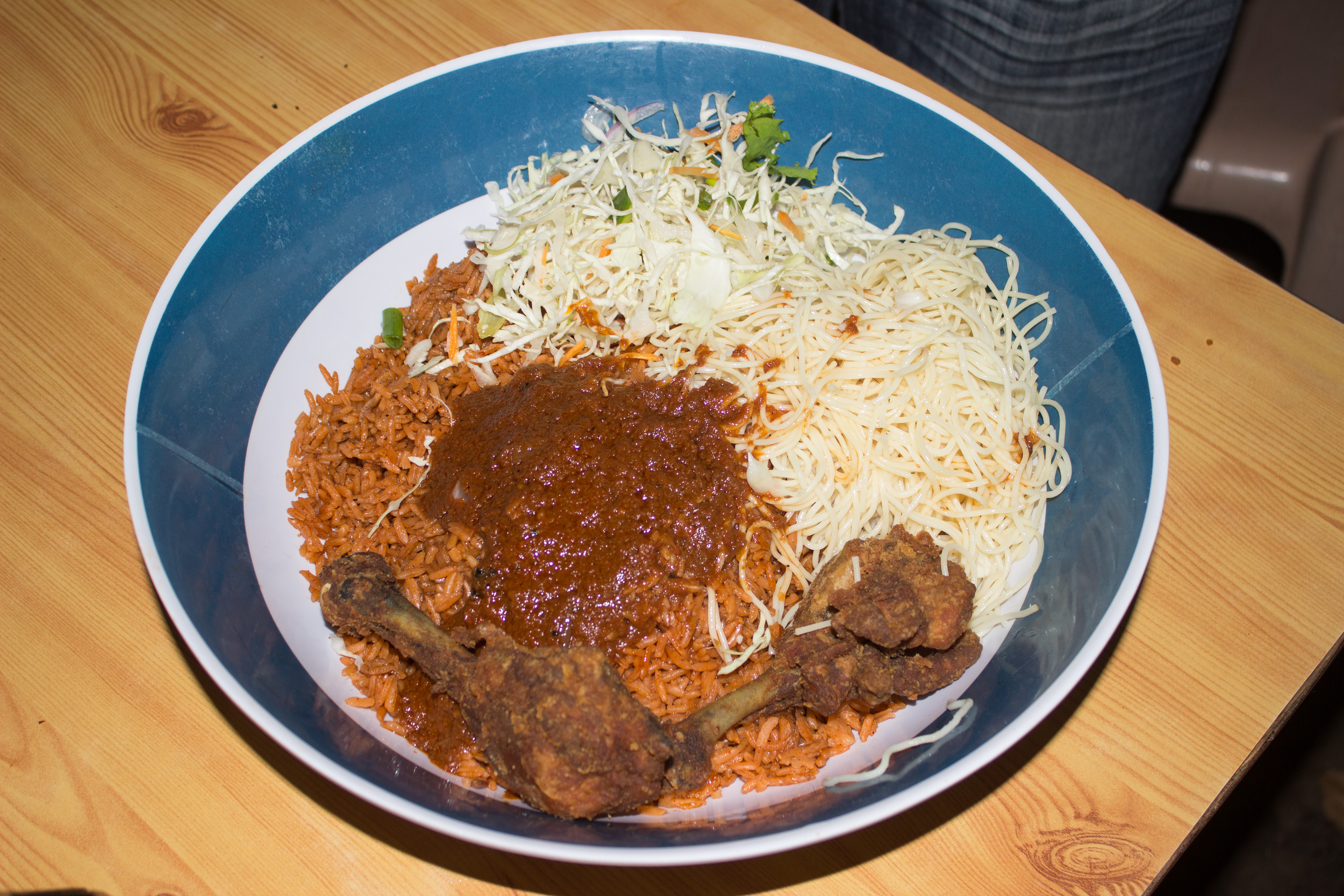
West African jollof rice is cooked with tomatoes and poultry. Some historians suggest this dish influenced the jambalaya.

Jambalaya is a Creole/Cajun-American dish that originated in French Louisiana during the colonial period. These two cuisines blended in Louisiana; but also resulted in cultural and regional variations in how the dish is prepared. There are a number of dishes with disparate origins that use some of the same ingredients. In West Africa there is a rice dish called "jollof rice" that according to researcher Kayla Stewart apparently developed from thiéboudienne, a Senegalese dish made of red rice, fish, cassava, and carrots. Author Kelley Fanto Deetz also suggests jambalaya has roots in jollof rice.

In the records of slave narratives, formerly enslaved Black Americans made jambalaya. Historians who researched the records of slave narratives say they point to a possible Caribbean and African origin of the dish. According to a Smithsonian Institution folklife article, jambalaya is a syncretic blend of West African, French, and Spanish influences. The territory of Louisiana was colonized by the French and Spanish during the colonial period and trafficked enslaved West Africans who had knowledge of rice cultivation. It is prepared and eaten in African-American, Cajun, and Creole communities. There are variations of how the dish is prepared within each community.

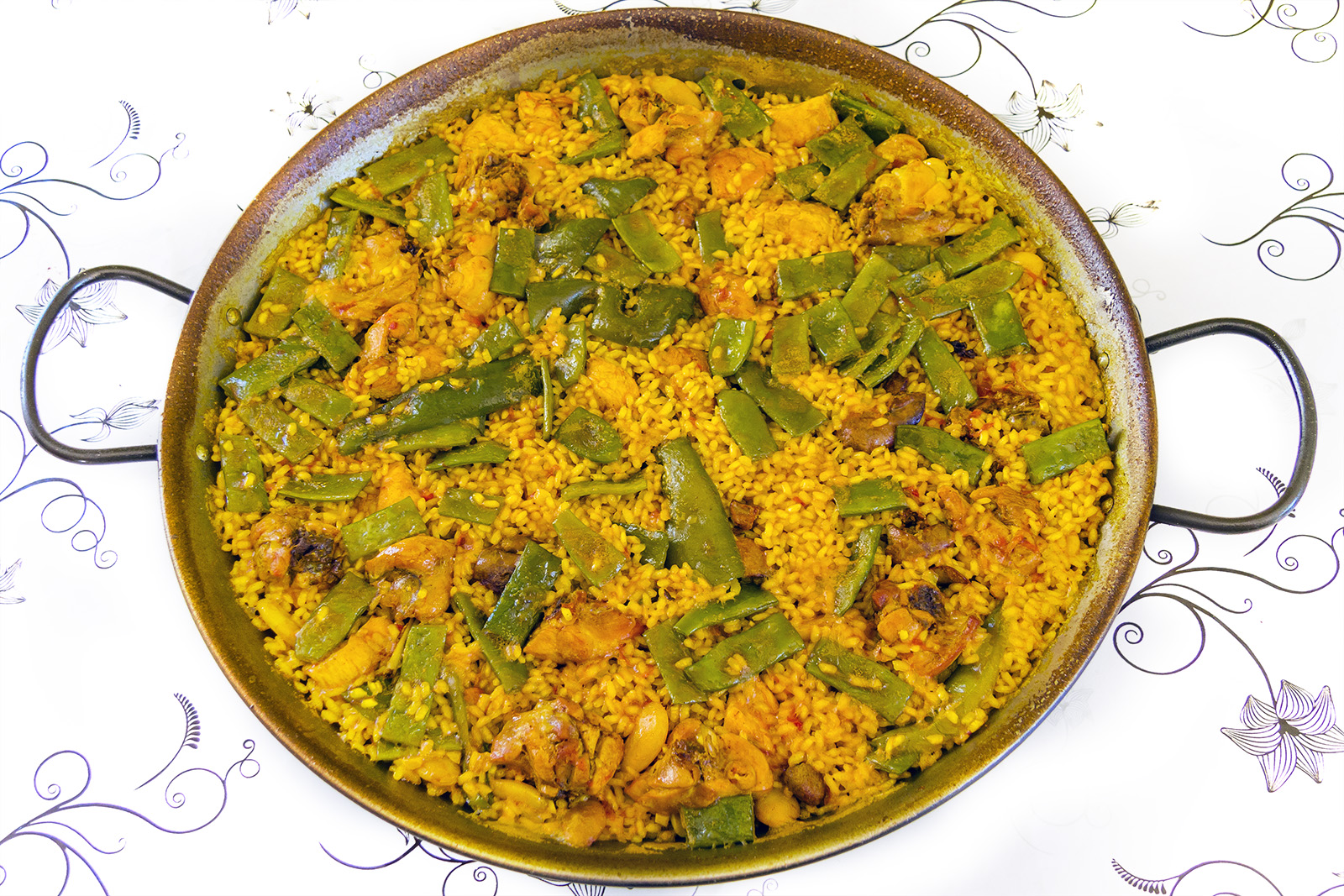
Some historians suggest Valenciana paella influenced jambalaya.

According to author James McCann, jambalaya has Creole, Cajun, West African, and Caribbean roots. In West Africa a dish similar to jambalaya is called dafa, which means to "cook everything". In West African cuisine, meat, fish and shellfish are all cooked in the same pot with rice to absorb juices from meats. According to the Encyclopedia of African American History, the spicy flavor and heat of the dish points to a West African influence. The West Africans trafficked to Louisiana came from Senegal, which was a rice-growing region. West Africans today still add spicy seasonings to their one-pot rice cooked meals.

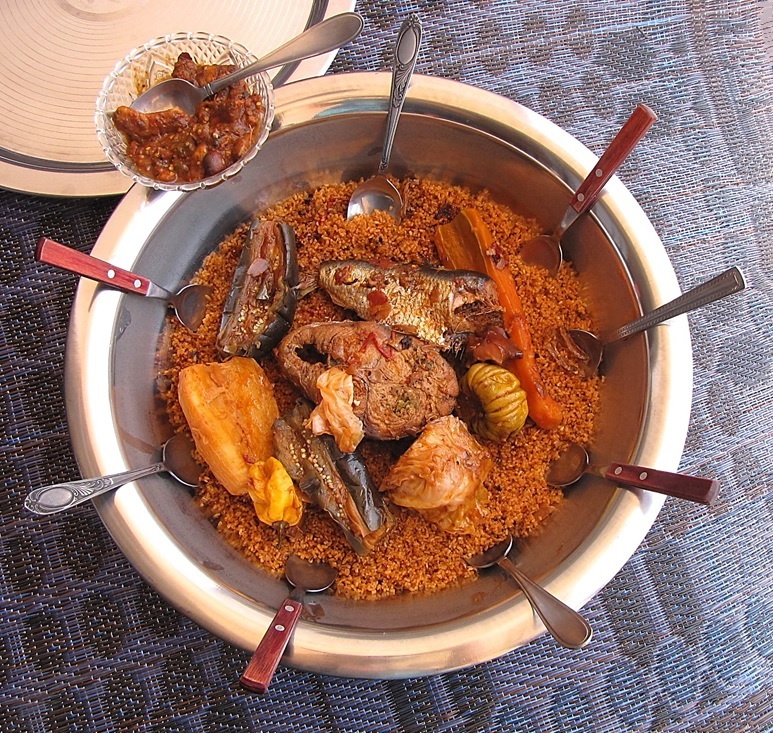
Author Ibraham Seck suggests that jambalaya has origins in Senegalese cuisine.

According to research from Taharka Adé, an associate professor in the Department of Africana Studies at San Diego State University, the French introduced the tomato (a food native to the Americas) to Senegal and Akan people in the rice-growing regions of West Africa, and through this interaction West Africans enhanced a dish called Jollof. Within the very same time frame, a mix of west African people (which included Senegambians and Akan) living in southern Louisiana, and particularly New Orleans, created another rice-and-tomato-based dish known as jambalaya, denoting a shared relationship and underpinning West African influence on the creation of jambalaya. Author Ibraham Seck, director of research at the Whitney Plantation Slave Museum in St. John the Baptist Parish, suggests jambalaya originated on the Senegalese coast of West Africa. Senegalese people had knowledge of rice cultivation and created dishes using rice and meats that were brought to Louisiana during the era of the slave trade. About sixty percent of enslaved captives brought to Louisiana came from Senegal. An article from the United Nations states that the cuisines of Nigeria, Senegal, Guinea, and Benin influenced the development of jambalaya: "Jambalaya (mixed rice, meat and vegetables), feijoada (black beans and meat), gombo (okra), and hopping johns (peas) are all dishes that have been re-adapted from Senegal, Nigeria, Guinea and Benin. You will find variations of these dishes in America and the Caribbean region." Historian Karen Hess states jambalaya has French and Spanish influences. The French influence is from the dish pilau, which is cooked with rice and seasoning. However, French pilau does not add seafood and meat, which is typically done in Spanish Valencian paella, West African, and Caribbean cuisines.

=== History ===
The history of jambalaya points to a West African influence. Rice was and is a traditional staple in West Africa, where one-pot mixed rice dishes such as thiéboudienne, benachin or Jollof rice were common. In the records of slave narratives, formerly enslaved African Americans from Louisiana made jambalaya as a meal with rice, pork or chicken, red pepper, onion, lard, salt and pepper. Black Americans adapted West African dishes in the Southern United States by using North American ingredients. These meals were prepared to survive during the era of slavery.

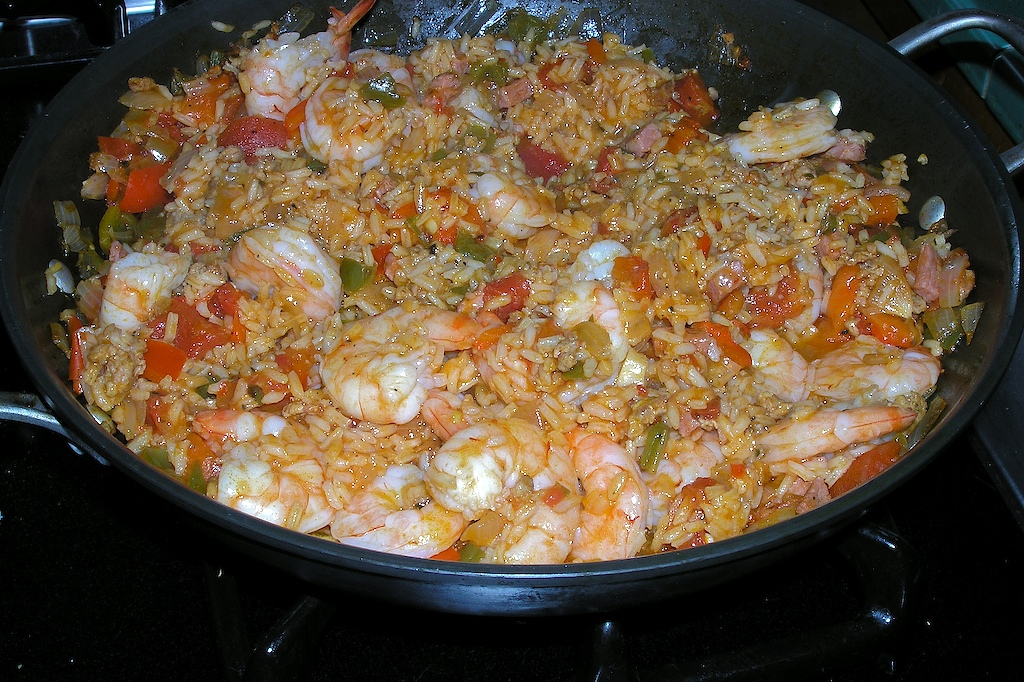
Creole jambalaya with shrimp, ham, tomato, and andouille sausage

There is some folklore that claims jambalaya originates from the French Quarter of New Orleans, in the original sector. Some culinary scholars argue that it may have been a local version of the Spanish rice dish paella. French influence was strong in New Orleans, and native spices from Louisiana, the Gulf Coast and the Caribbean may have changed this pilaf or paella into a unique New World dish. As author and professor Judith Carney explains: "...jambalaya resulted from cooking raw rice in the broth of stew composed of ingredients from many cultural heritages."

=== Ingredients ===
Traditionally, the meat includes sausage of some sort, often a smoked meat such as andouille, along with pork, chicken or seafood (less common), such as crawfish or shrimp. The vegetables are usually a sofrito-like mixture known as the "trinity" in Creole and Cajun cooking, consisting of onion, celery, and green bell pepper, though other vegetables such as okra, carrots, tomatoes, corn, chilis and garlic are also used.

After browning and sauteing the meat and vegetables, rice is added with seasonings and broth, and the entire dish is cooked together until the rice is done.

=== Similar dishes ===
Jambalaya is similar to (but distinct from) other rice-and-meat dishes known in Louisiana cuisine such as gumbo and étouffée.

Gumbo uses similar sausages, meats, seafood, vegetables and seasonings. However, gumbo usually (though not always) includes filé powder or okra, which are not common in jambalaya. Gumbo is also usually served over white rice, which is prepared separately from the rest of the dish, unlike jambalaya, where the rice is prepared with the other ingredients.

Jambalaya is differentiated from gumbo and étouffée by the way in which the rice is included. In these dishes, the rice is cooked separately and is served as a bed on which the main dish is served. In the usual method of preparing jambalaya, a rich stock is created from vegetables, meat and seafood; raw rice is then added to the broth and the flavor is absorbed by the grains as the rice cooks.

Étouffée is a stew that always includes shellfish such as shrimp or crawfish but does not have the sausage common to jambalaya and gumbo. Also, like gumbo, étouffée is usually served over separately prepared rice.

== Cultural and regional variations ==
There are two primary methods of making jambalaya, differentiated by the presence or absence of tomatoes.

=== African-American variation ===
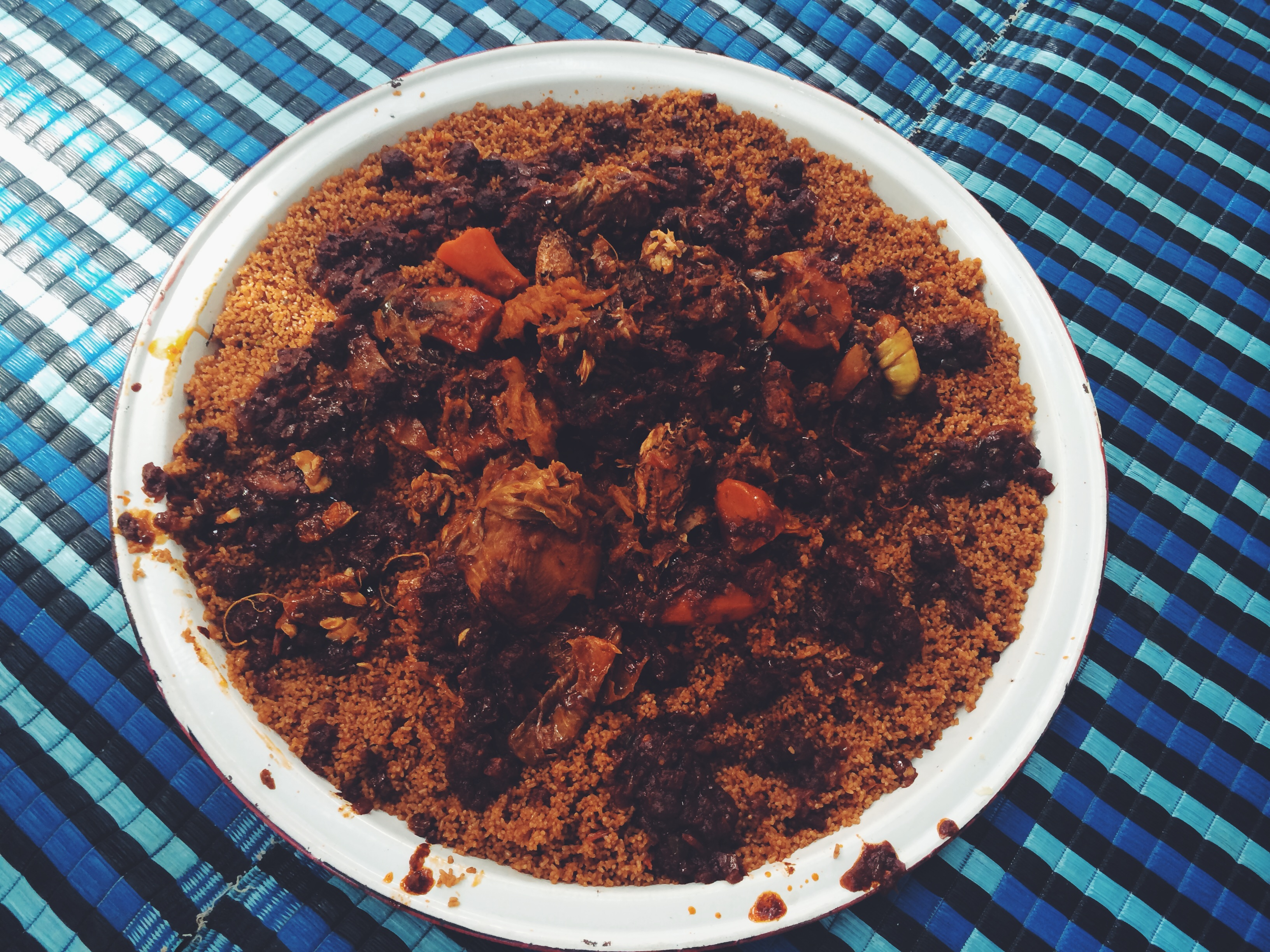
Senegalese cuisine influenced the dish jambalaya

In narratives told by enslaved Black people, their ancestors made jambalaya. According to some historians, jambalaya was prepared and eaten in West Africa using tomatoes introduced to West Africans by the French. Rice dishes with meats and vegetables cooked in one pot with spices is a common meal in West Africa. During the slave trade, about sixty percent of enslaved people brought to Louisiana were Senegalese. They brought Senegalese cuisine to Louisiana which already had a version of jambalaya. Jambalaya in Louisiana's Black communities incorporates tomatoes, and meats. In rural south Louisiana, jambalaya is brown from absorbing the sauce it is cooked in, as it is traditionally cooked in cast-iron pots, which reach high cooking temperatures, "resulting in a more complete caramelization of the natural sugars in meats and vegetables". Enslaved Africans served this dish to their French and Spanish slaveholders, resulting in a fusion of the dish as Spanish people had a dish similar to jambalaya called paella. Jollof rice from West African cuisine influenced the jambalaya made in African-American communities. A modern variation of jambalaya was documented in an African-American cookbook. This jambalaya dish used ham and sausage, tomatoes and tomato sauce, and was seasoned with spices and bell pepper and other ingredients cooked in a pot.

=== Cajun ===
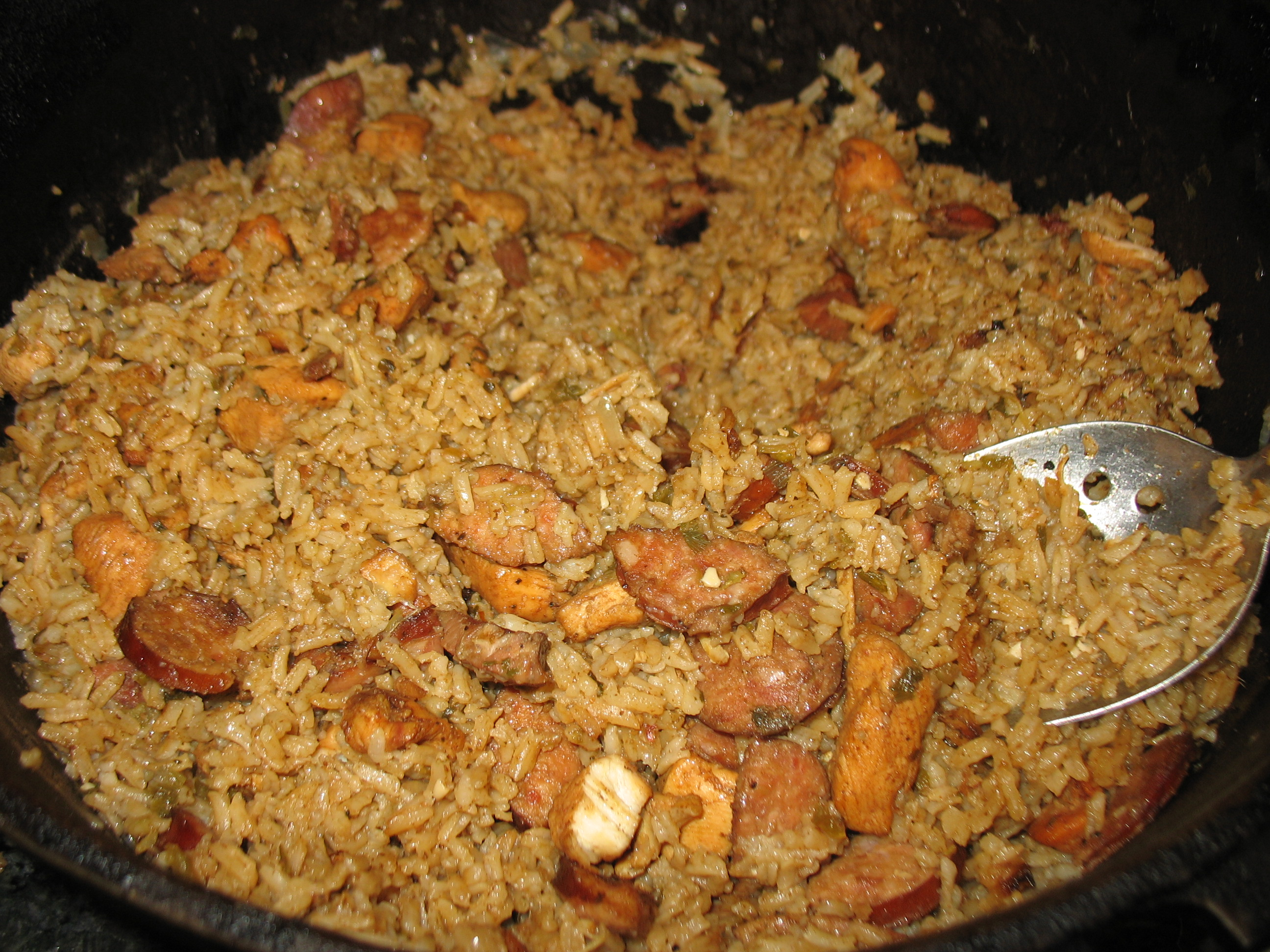
Jambalaya without tomatoes

The second style, more characteristic of southwestern and south-central Louisiana, is Cajun jambalaya, which contains no tomatoes (the idea being the farther away from New Orleans one gets, the less common tomatoes are in dishes). The meat is browned in a cast-iron pot. The bits of meat that stick to the bottom of the pot (sucs) are what give a Cajun jambalaya its brown color. A little vegetable oil is added if there is not enough fat in the pot. The trinity (of 50% onions, 25% celery, and 25% green or red bell pepper, although proportions can be altered to suit one's taste) is added and sautéed until soft. Stock and seasonings are added in the next step, and then the meats are returned to the pot. This mixture is then simmered, covered, for at least one hour. Lastly, the mixture is brought to a boil and rice is added to the pot. It is then covered and left to simmer over very low heat for at least 1/2 hour without stirring. The dish is finished when the rice has cooked.

In some Cajun kitchens, jambalaya is made with seasoned sausage or ham, rice, parsley, stock and spices and put in a pot and cooked with rice until done, and sometimes prepared with cooked rice.

=== Creole ===
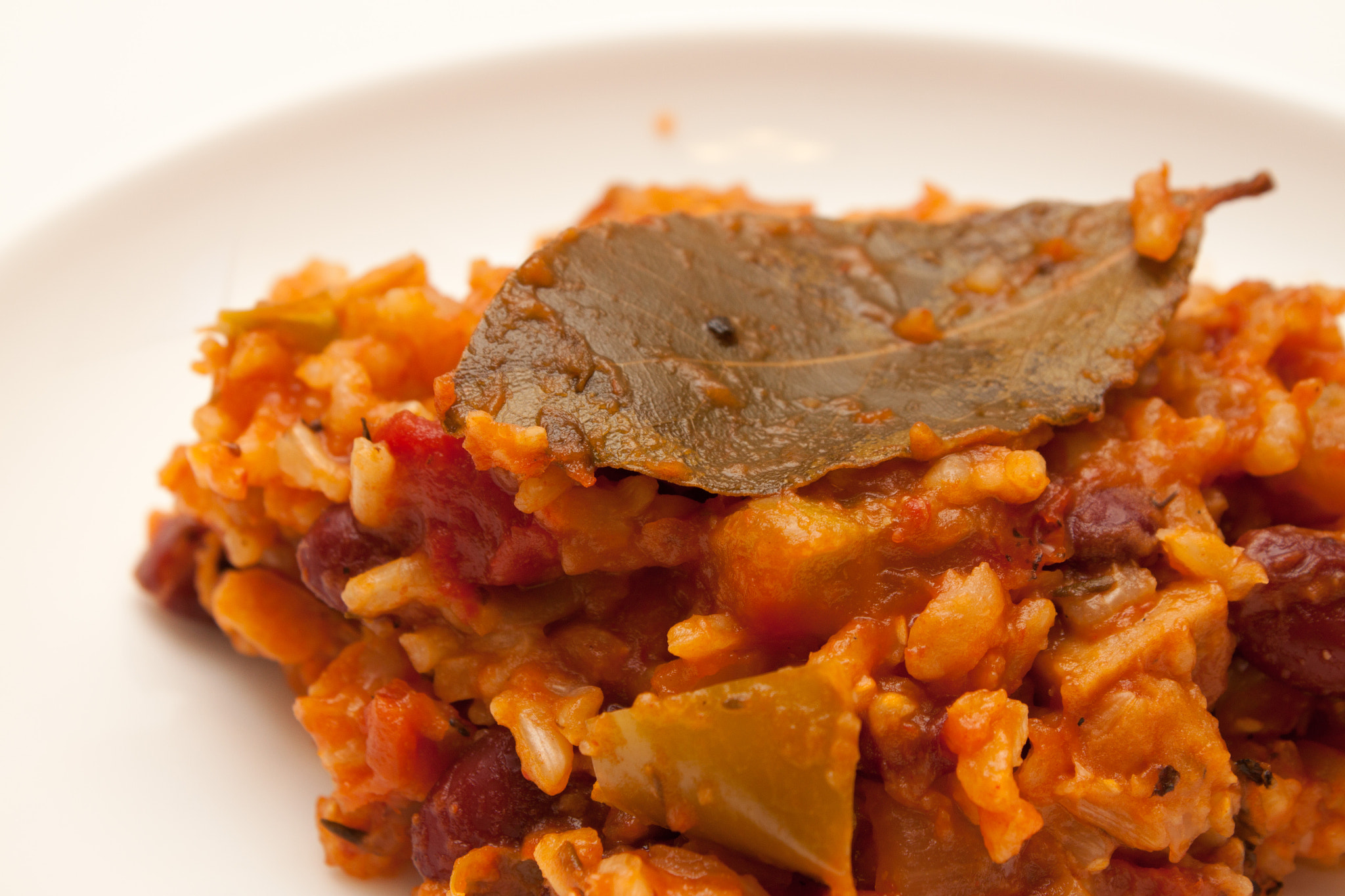
Jambalaya made with tomatoes showing a wetter consistency

The first is Creole jambalaya (also called "red jambalaya") because it is made with tomatoes. First, meat is added to the trinity of celery, peppers, and onions; the meat is usually chicken and sausage such as andouille or smoked sausage. Next, vegetables and tomatoes, which are added to cook, followed by seafood. Rice and stock are added in equal proportions at the very end. The mixture is brought to a boil and left to simmer for 20 to 60 minutes, depending on the recipe, with infrequent stirring. Towards the end of the cooking process, stirring usually ceases. Some versions call for the jambalaya to be baked after the cooking of all the ingredients.

In some Creole kitchens, jambalaya is made with smoked chaudin (ponce) and in Cajun kitchens is made with crawfish. Some cooks note the regional variations of jambalaya. Authors Abby Fisher and Karen Hess stated Creole New Orleans jambalaya is "soupy". While other variations of jambalaya are dry.

=== New Orleans style vs Acadiana style ===
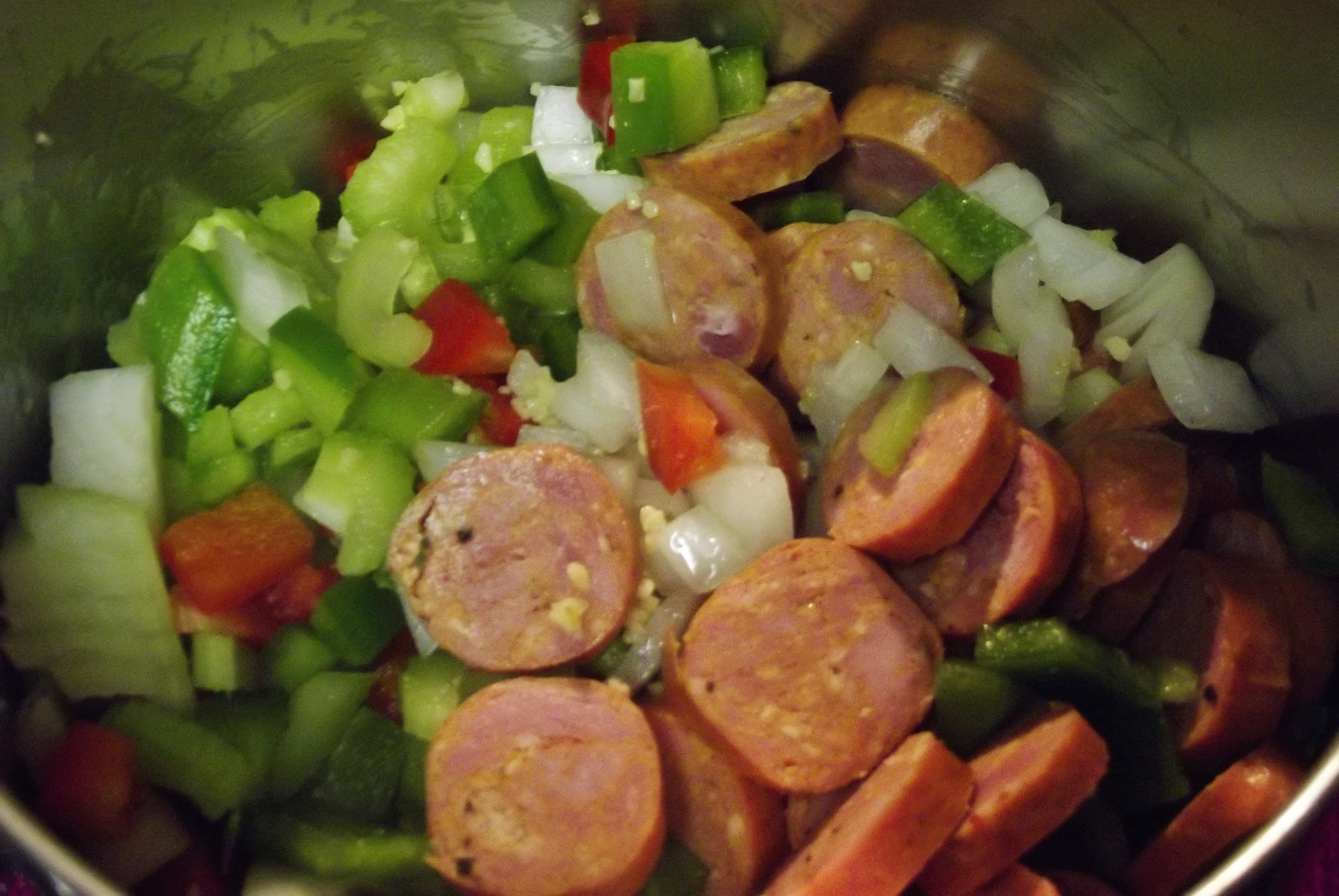
Ingredients for jambalaya in a pot beginning to cook

In modern Louisiana, the dish has evolved along a variety of different lines.

New Orleans style jambalaya, called "red jambalaya" in Acadiana, is found primarily in and around New Orleans, where it is known simply as "jambalaya". It is called red jambalaya because it is made with tomatoes. New Orleans style jambalaya includes tomatoes, whereas Acadiana style jambalaya usually does not.

Acadiana style jambalaya originates from Louisiana's rural, low-lying swamp country where crawfish, shrimp, oysters, alligator, duck, turtle, boar, venison, nutria and other game were readily available. Any variety or combination of meats, including chicken or turkey, may be used to make jambalaya. Acadiana style jambalaya is known as "brown jambalaya" in the Greater New Orleans area (except for the lower Westbank where it can be found among some families); to folks from Acadiana it is simply known as "jambalaya".

This video shows the difference between Creole and Cajun jambalaya. Jambalaya is made differently depending on the region and is inspired by French and Spanish cultures.

== Cultural relevance ==
=== Jambalaya in print ===
The first appearance in print of any variant of the word 'jambalaya' in any language occurred in Leis amours de Vanus; vo, Lou paysan oou théâtré, by Fortuné (Fortunat) Chailan, first published in Provençal dialect in 1837.

The earliest appearance of the word in print in English occurs in the May 1849 issue of the American Agriculturalist, page 161, where Solon Robinson refers to a recipe for "Hopping Johnny (jambalaya)", however he made a mistake in identifying jambalaya as "Hopping Johnny", which is an entirely different dish with different origins and different birth state.

Jambalaya did not appear in a cookbook until 1878, when the Gulf City Cook Book, by the ladies of the St. Francis Street Methodist Episcopal Church, was printed in South Mobile, Alabama. It contains a recipe for "JAM BOLAYA".

Jambalaya had a brief jump in popularity during the 1920s and 1930s because of its flexible recipe. The dish was little more than the rice and vegetables the populace could afford; the recipe grew from humble roots.

=== Jambalaya capital of the world ===
In 1968, Louisiana Governor John J. McKeithen proclaimed Gonzales, Louisiana, "the Jambalaya capital of the world". Every spring, the annual Jambalaya Festival is held in Gonzales.

== See also ==
- List of regional dishes of the United States
- List of rice dishes
