= Holy trinity (cooking) =

Flavor base used extensively in Cajun cooking

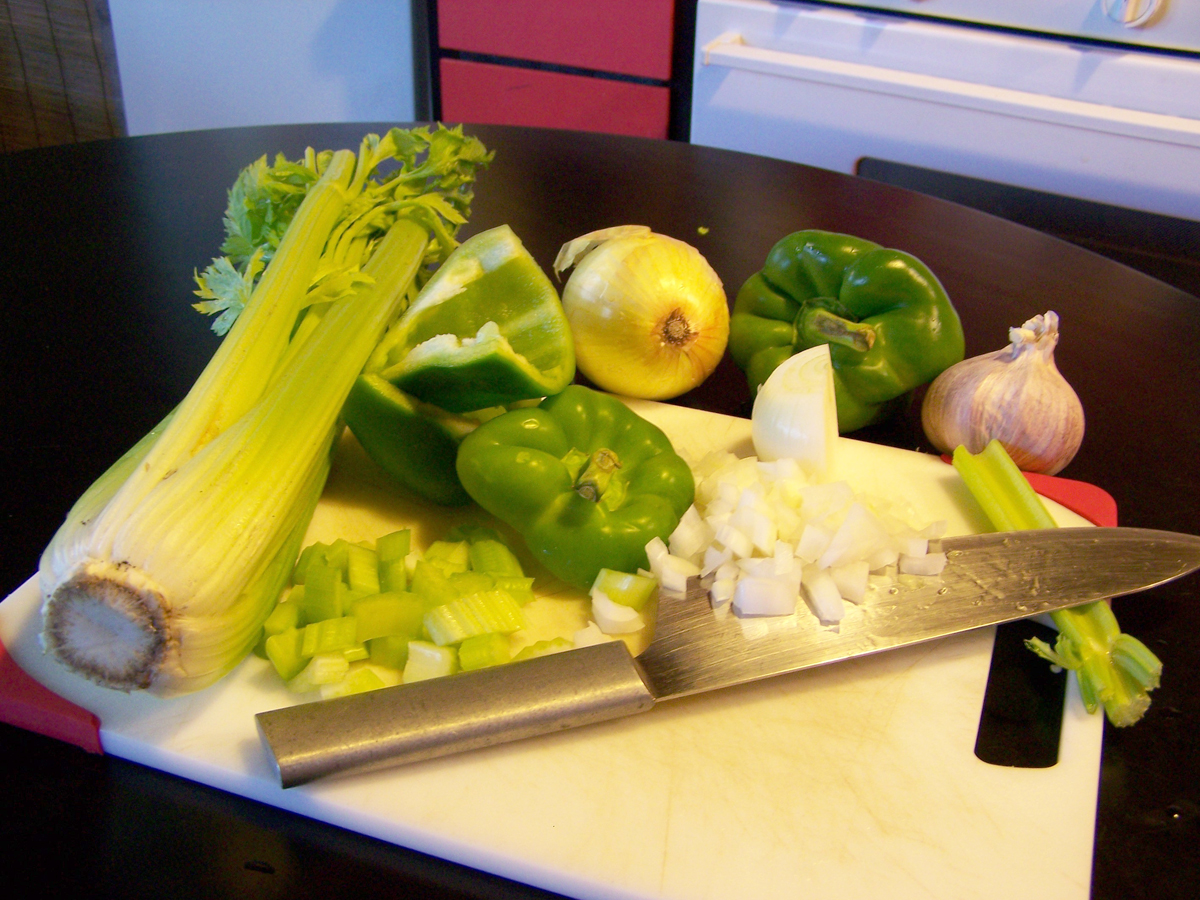
Cajun holy trinity (with the addition of garlic)

In Cajun and Louisiana Creole cuisine, the "holy trinity" consists of onions, bell peppers and celery. It serves as the base for several dishes in the regional cuisines of Louisiana, such as crawfish étouffée, gumbo, and jambalaya all start from this base.

Variants use garlic, parsley, or shallots in addition to the three trinity ingredients. The addition of garlic is sometimes referred to as adding "the pope".

The holy trinity is the Cajun and Louisiana Creole variant of mirepoix; traditional mirepoix is two parts onions, one part carrots, and one part celery, whereas the holy trinity is typically one or two parts onions, one part green bell pepper, and one part celery. It is also an evolution of the Spanish sofrito, which contains onion, garlic, bell peppers, and tomatoes.

== History ==
After the Acadians were exiled from Nova Scotia, Canada in 1755, they settled in Louisiana. When attempting to import the French culinary tradition of using mirepoix, the carrots in the traditional mixture was changed to bell peppers, for reasons including availability and cost. Bell peppers grew much easier in Louisiana. It is thought that German and Italian immigrants brought celery to the area in the late 1700s. The Italians grew a lot of celery in their gardens. Both celery and the bell peppers were wilder versions of those we use today.

People in South Louisiana had been using the term in the kitchen for hundreds of years. Chef John Folse said that "around 1775, around the time of [US] independence and before the Battle of New Orleans, the flavors that we understand today as Louisiana cooking were established." The holy trinity was popularized in the late 1970s, and was de rigueur by the early 1980s. Everyone grew onions, bell pepper and celery in their own gardens and, in general, the ingredients were very cheap and available.

Although the trinity is now famously known in both Cajun and Creole cooking, it originated in Cajun cuisine. The Creole people in New Orleans had access to the many foods that came in to the city's port. However, Cajun cooks relied on what they grew or what was available at nearby farms. Renowned Creole Chef Leah Chase of Dooky Chase's Restaurant also confirmed that "it wasn't the Creoles, [but] the Cajuns...Creoles of color did not use very much celery. That's relatively new to us. We used bell pepper and green onions and onions, maybe some garlic."

=== Origin of the name ===
The name is an allusion to the Christian doctrine of the Trinity. The term is first attested in 1981 and was probably popularized by Paul Prudhomme.

== See also ==
- Mirepoix
- Sofrito
- Epis
