= Cuisine of New Orleans =

Culinary traditions of New Orleans, Louisiana, US

Location of New Orleans in the United States

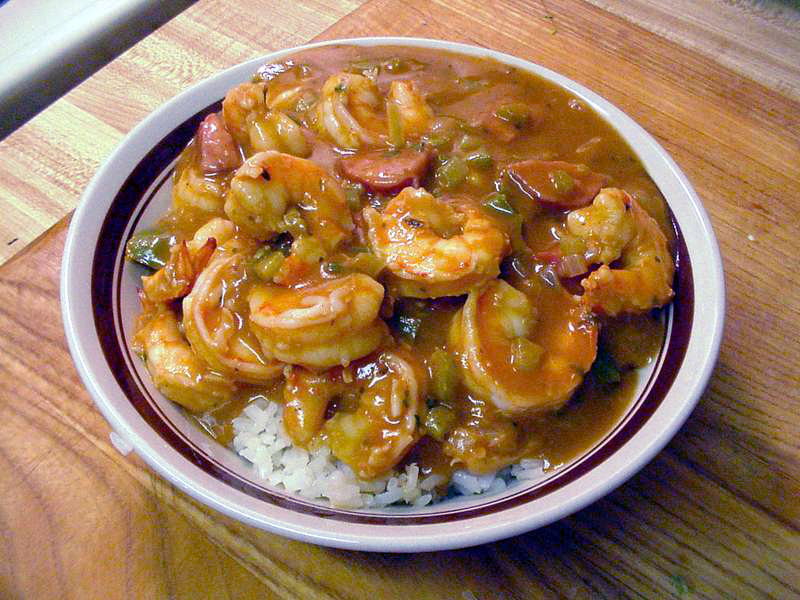
Shrimp gumbo and rice

The cuisine of New Orleans encompasses common dishes and foods in New Orleans, Louisiana. It is perhaps the most distinctively recognized regional cuisine in the United States. Some of the dishes originated in New Orleans, while others are common and popular in the city and surrounding areas, such as the Mississippi River Delta and southern Louisiana. The cuisine of New Orleans is heavily influenced by Creole cuisine, Cajun cuisine, and soul food. Later on, due to immigration, Italian cuisine and Sicilian cuisine also has some influence on the cuisine of New Orleans. Seafood also plays a prominent part in the cuisine. Dishes invented in New Orleans include po' boy and muffuletta sandwiches, oysters Rockefeller and oysters Bienville, pompano en papillote, and bananas Foster, among others.

== Influences ==
Creoles are descendants of the settlers in colonial Louisiana, especially New Orleans. Before Louisiana became a part of the United States in 1803, it was colonized for more than a century, first by France and then by Spain. The Creoles were the American-born offspring of these European settlers. Some Creoles are people of mixed race who also have West African and Native American ancestry. The Creoles, most of whom originally spoke a dialect of French, created a sophisticated and cosmopolitan society in colonial New Orleans.

Creole cuisine is a fusion, unique to the New Orleans area, of French, Spanish, West African, and Native American cuisine. It was also influenced by later immigrants from Germany, Italy (particularly Sicily), and other locations. Like French food, it sometimes makes use of rich sauces and complex preparation techniques. Creole dishes often include onions, bell peppers, celery, tomatoes, and okra.

Cajun cuisine is also based partly on French cuisine and also makes use of local ingredients such as bell peppers, and celery. It tends to be hearty, rustic fare, complex in flavor but easier to prepare. The Cajuns are descendants of the Acadians, French-Canadian colonists who were expelled from the Maritimes by the British. Some of the Acadians settled in rural areas of southern Louisiana in the 1760s and 1770s. The Cajuns spoke their dialect of French. Cajun cuisine uses less fish and more shellfish, pork, and game than Creole cuisine. While not always spicy, Cajun food is known for its unique use of many seasonings, including garlic, hot peppers, and filé powder.

Soul food was created by the African-American descendants of slaves. It is closely related to the cuisine of the Southern United States, but its origins trace back to West Africa. It often features hearty, flavorful dishes made with economical ingredients. Soul food is very popular in New Orleans.

Seafood plays an important part in the cuisine of New Orleans. The city is located where the Mississippi River flows into the Gulf of Mexico, so its residents have access to a rich variety of both saltwater and freshwater fish and shellfish.

== Popular cuisine items ==
=== Entrees and side dishes ===
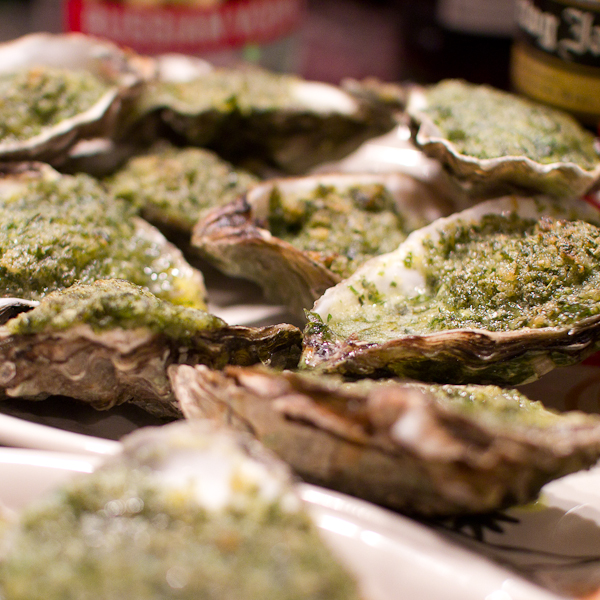
Oysters Rockefeller was invented at the New Orleans restaurant Antoine's.

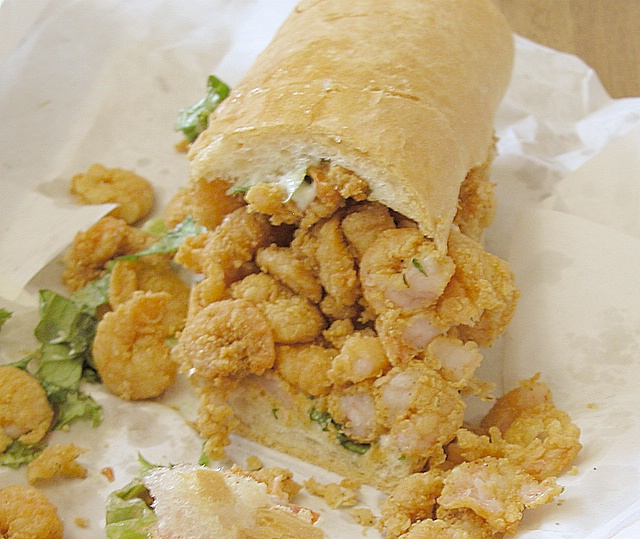
Po' boy sandwiches are associated with the cuisine of New Orleans

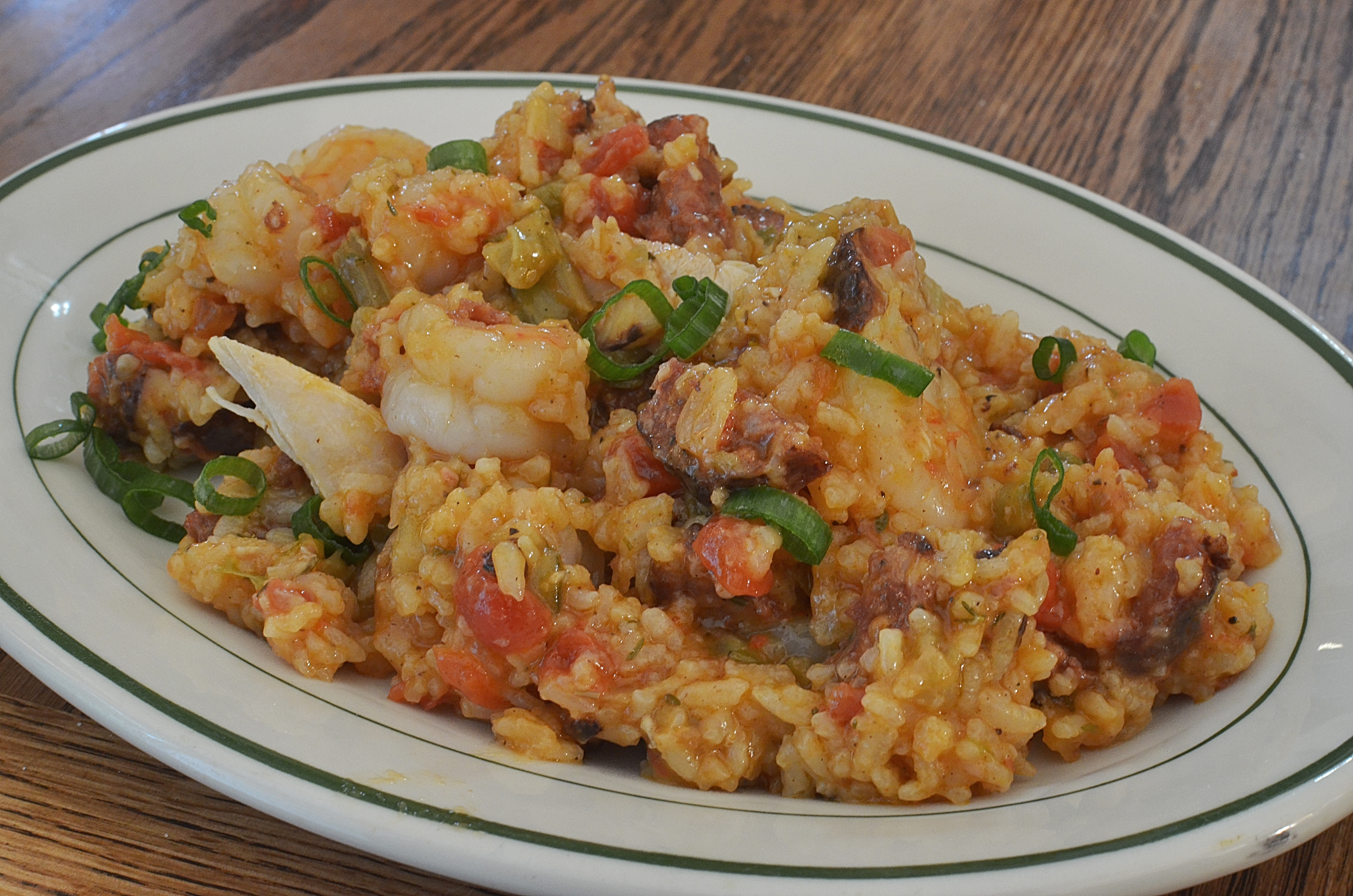
Jambalaya

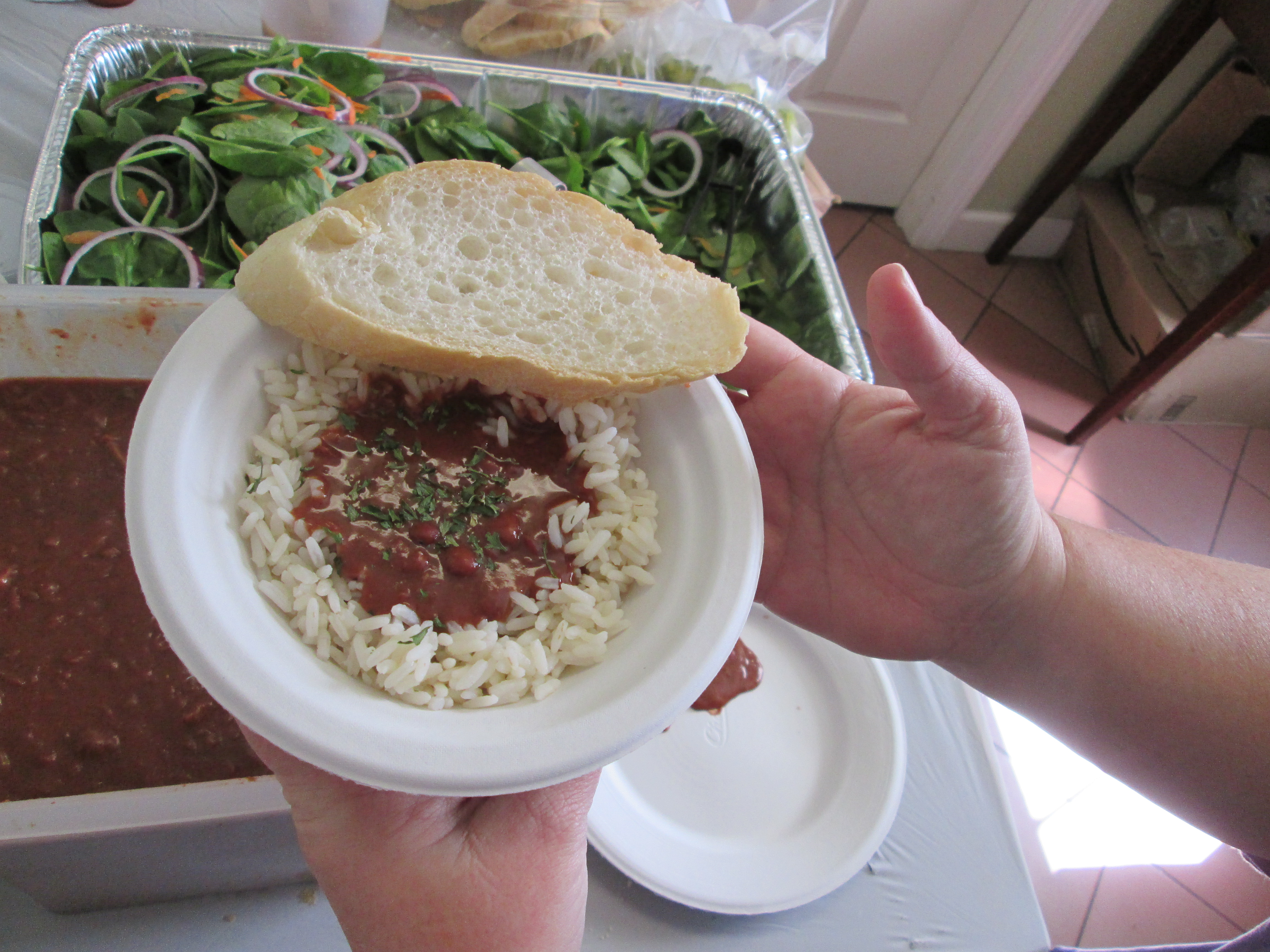
Red beans and rice at an event in the French Quarter of New Orleans

- Andouille—a smoked sausage made with pork shoulder roast, garlic, and other spices; often used as an ingredient in dishes such as gumbo and jambalaya
- Blackened redfish—a redfish filet, coated with a mixture of seasonings and flash-fried in a red hot cast-iron skillet; the skin of the fish is charred black, while the inside is moist and tender
- Boiled seafood—boiled shellfish such as crawfish, shrimp, and crabs, often served with boiled corn and potatoes
- Boudin—sausage made with pork, rice, and Cajun spices.
- Calas—dumplings composed primarily of cooked rice, yeast, sugar, eggs, and flour; the resulting batter is deep-fried, traditionally a breakfast dish, served with coffee or cafe au lait
- Couche-couche—a fried cornmeal dish that is traditionally eaten for breakfast; ingredients such as eggs, raisins, milk, or syrup are sometimes added
- Dirty rice—a traditional Cajun and Creole dish made from white rice that gets a "dirty" color from being cooked with small pieces of chicken liver or giblets, green bell pepper, celery, and onion, and spiced with cayenne and black pepper. (Note: which give it a dark ("dirty") color. Frommer's New Orleans)
- Eggs Sardou—poached eggs with artichoke bottoms, creamed spinach, and hollandaise sauce, sometimes with other ingredients such as anchovies or chopped ham
- Étouffée—crawfish (or sometimes other shellfish such as shrimp or crabs) cooked using a technique called smothering, with roux, Cajun spices, and other ingredients, and served with rice
- Gumbo—a stew of meat and/or shellfish, with celery, bell peppers, onions, and a stock made with either okra, filé powder, or roux
- Hot sausage
- Jambalaya—a dish of rice and meat (often a combination of andouille sausage, chicken, and shrimp) cooked with vegetables and Creole spices
- Maque choux—a creamy corn stew, usually made with bell peppers, onions, and tomatoes; it is sometimes braised with bacon or tasso
- Muffuletta—a sandwich on a muffuletta bread (a round Italian bread with sesame seeds), with olive salad spread on the bread, filled with various meats and cheeses such as ham, capicola, salami, mortadella, mozzarella, and provolone
- Oysters Bienville—a traditional dish in New Orleans cuisine, it consists of filled, baked oysters; ingredients include shrimp, mushrooms, bell peppers, sherry, a roux with butter, Parmesan cheese and other lighter cheese, as well as bread crumbs
- Oysters en brochette—a classic dish in New Orleans Creole cuisine, raw oysters are skewered, alternating with pieces of partially cooked bacon; the entire dish is then broiled or breaded (usually with corn flour) then either deep fried or sautéed
- Oysters Rockefeller—oysters on the half-shell that have been topped with parsley and other green herbs, a rich butter sauce, and bread crumbs, and then baked or broiled
- Pistolette—either of two bread-based dishes in Louisiana cuisine: one is a stuffed and fried bread roll (sometimes called stuffed pistolettes) in the Cajun areas around Lafayette, the other is a type of submarine shaped bread about half the size of a baguette that is popular in New Orleans for Vietnamese bánh mì and other sandwiches
- Po' boy—a submarine sandwich on a wide piece of French bread; popular fillings include fried seafood such as shrimp, oysters, or catfish, and the more traditional roast beef with brown gravy; usually topped with shredded lettuce, tomatoes, and remoulade
- Pompano en papillote—a pompano filet cooked en papillote, i.e. in a sealed parchment paper envelope, with a white sauce of wine, shrimp, and crabmeat
- Red beans and rice—kidney beans cooked with Cajun spices, ham, and vegetables such as bell peppers, onions, and celery, served together with white rice
- Rice and gravy—small pieces of beef, or sometimes chicken or pork, simmered for a long time with onions, peppers, and other seasonings, and served over white rice
- Shrimp Creole—cooked shrimp in a mixture of tomatoes, onions, bell peppers, and celery, spiced with hot pepper sauce and/or cayenne-based seasoning, and served over steamed or boiled white rice
- Turtle soup—a thick soup made with turtle meat and Creole spices; the local species are now protected so turtle meat from other states is used; alternatively, a mock turtle soup is made with veal or other meat
- Yaka mein— a soup of stewed beef in broth with noodles, garnished with half a hard-boiled egg and chopped green onions, with Creole seasonings
New Orleans dishes

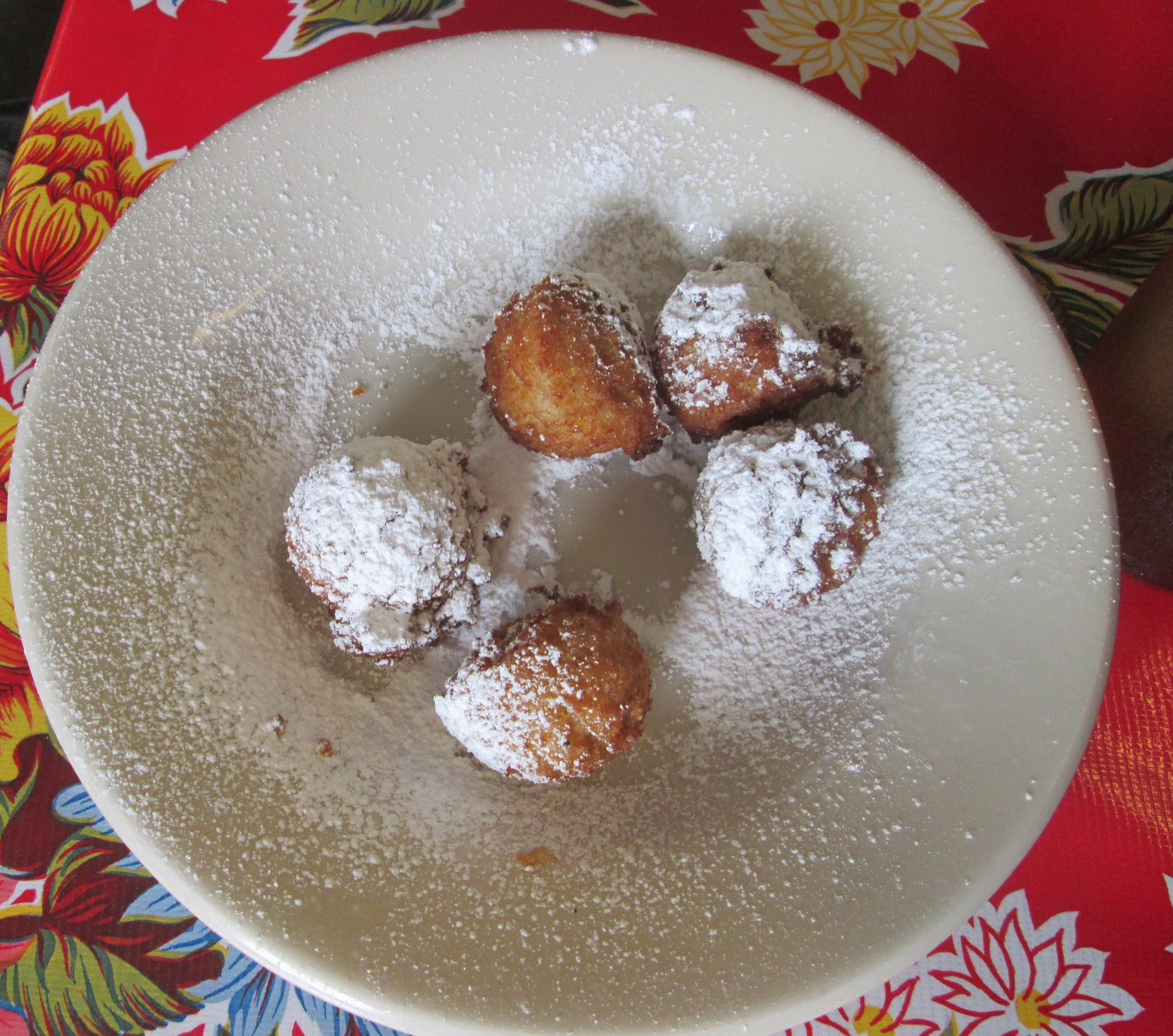
A plate of Calas at a New Orleans restaurant

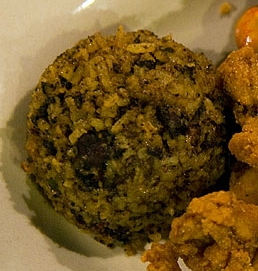
Dirty rice

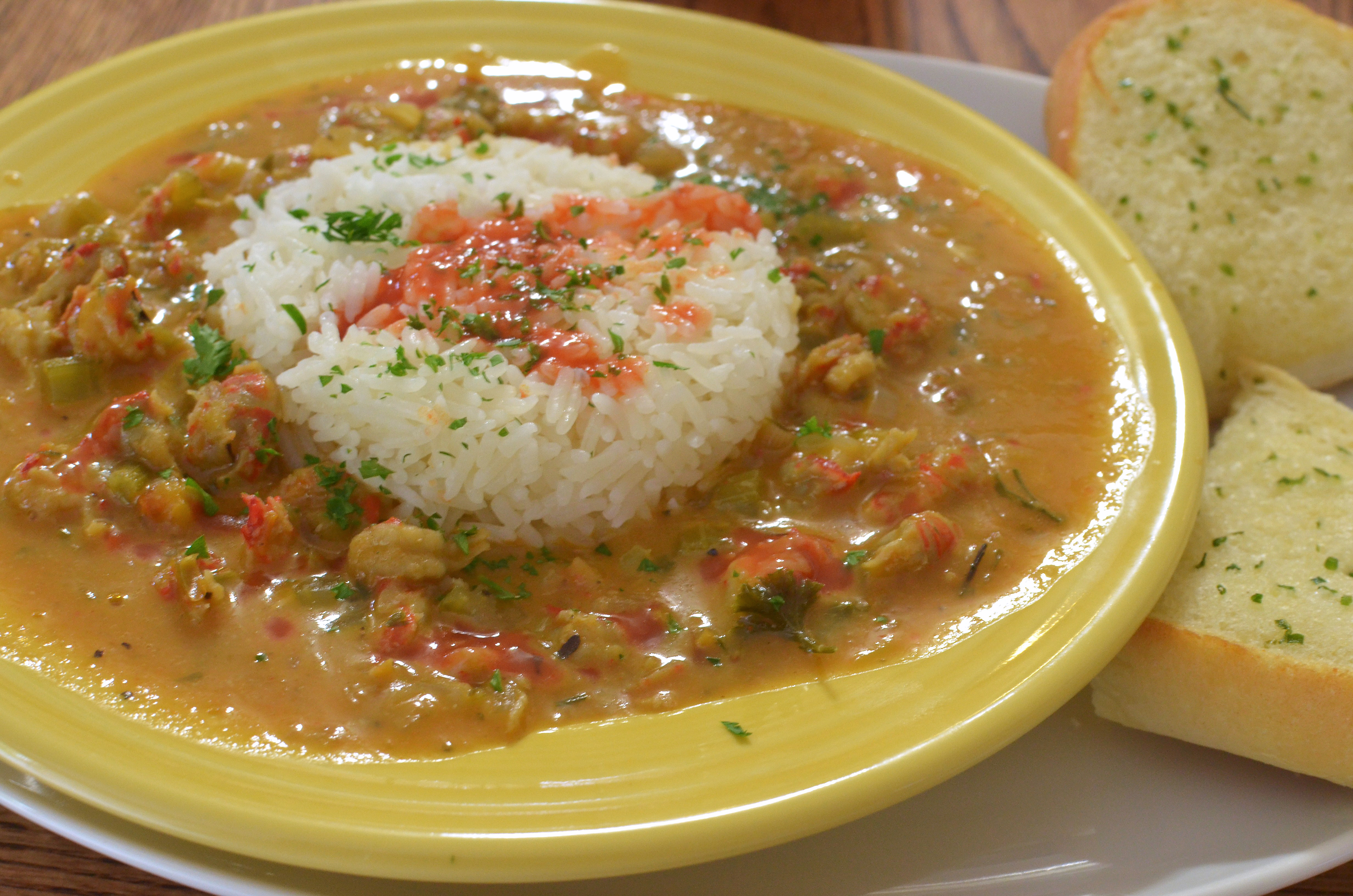
Crawfish étouffée

=== Desserts and sweets ===
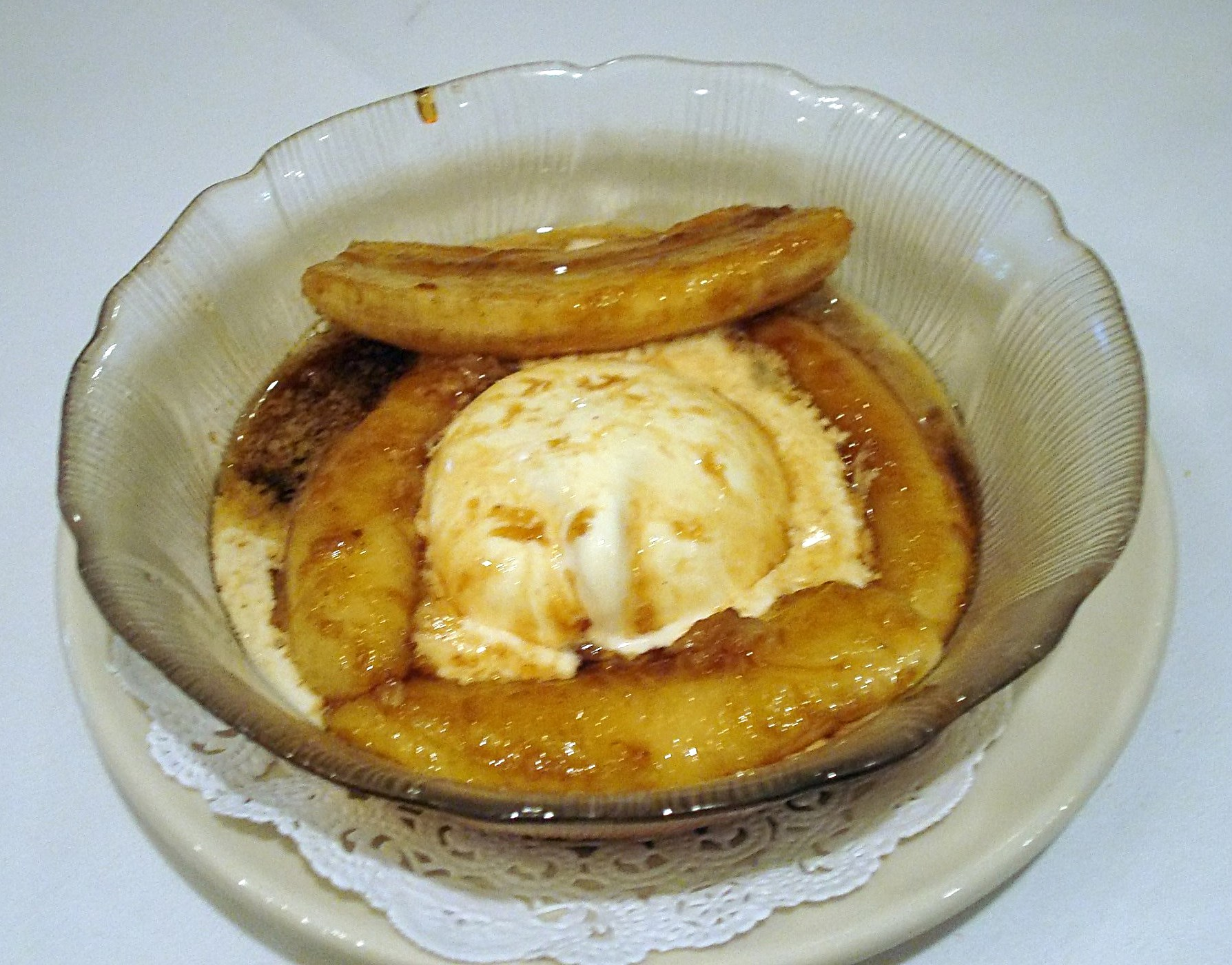
Bananas Foster

- Bananas Foster—a dessert made from bananas and vanilla ice cream, with a sauce made from butter, brown sugar, cinnamon, dark rum, and banana liqueur; often served as a flambé; created in 1951 by Paul Blangé at Brennan's restaurant in New Orleans
- Beignet—a square-shaped pastry made with deep-fried dough and topped with powdered sugar.
- Bread pudding—a sweet dessert made from bread, milk, eggs, and sugar, often served warm and topped with whiskey sauce, rum sauce, or caramel sauce
- Doberge cake—a cake with many thin layers, separated with dessert pudding or custard (often half chocolate and half lemon), and with a glazed outer frosting
- Hubig's Pies—a brand of mass-produced glazed turnovers of fried dough with various fruit fillings. Founded in 1922, a fire destroyed their factory in 2012, causing them to cease operations until they re-opened in 2022.
- Huckabuck—also known as a hucklebuck; a dessert made by taking any of various sweet, fruit-flavored drinks and freezing them in a cup; sometimes sold by street vendors
- King cake—a cake made of braided brioche dough laced with cinnamon, with purple, green, and gold frosting, and a small plastic baby hidden inside; eaten during Mardi Gras season
- Praline—a candy made with pecans, brown and white sugar, butter, and cream
- Sno-ball—shaved ice with flavored syrup, served in a cup with a straw; similar to a snow cone but with ice that is more finely ground and fluffy, which absorbs the syrup better
New Orleans desserts

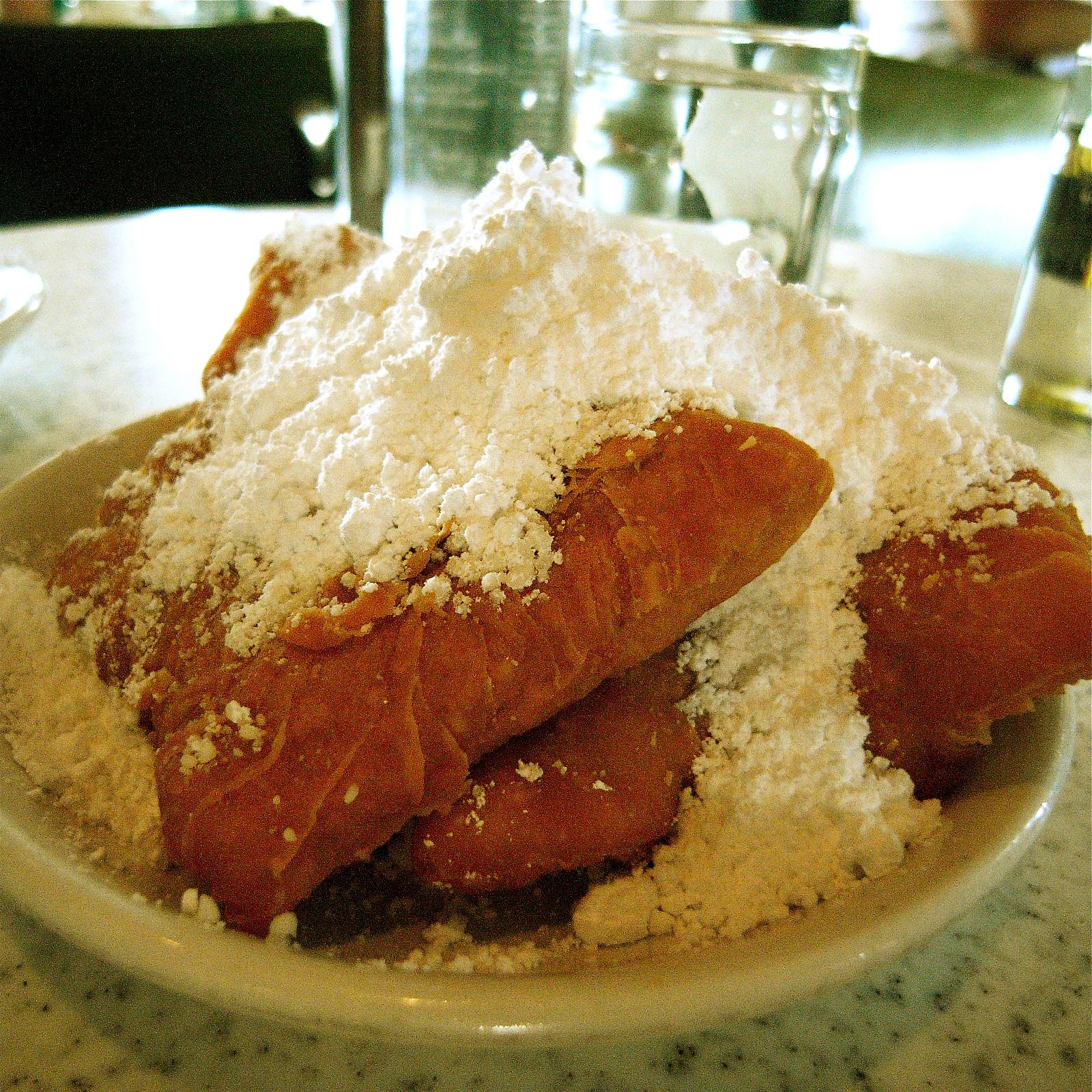
Beignets from Café du Monde in New Orleans

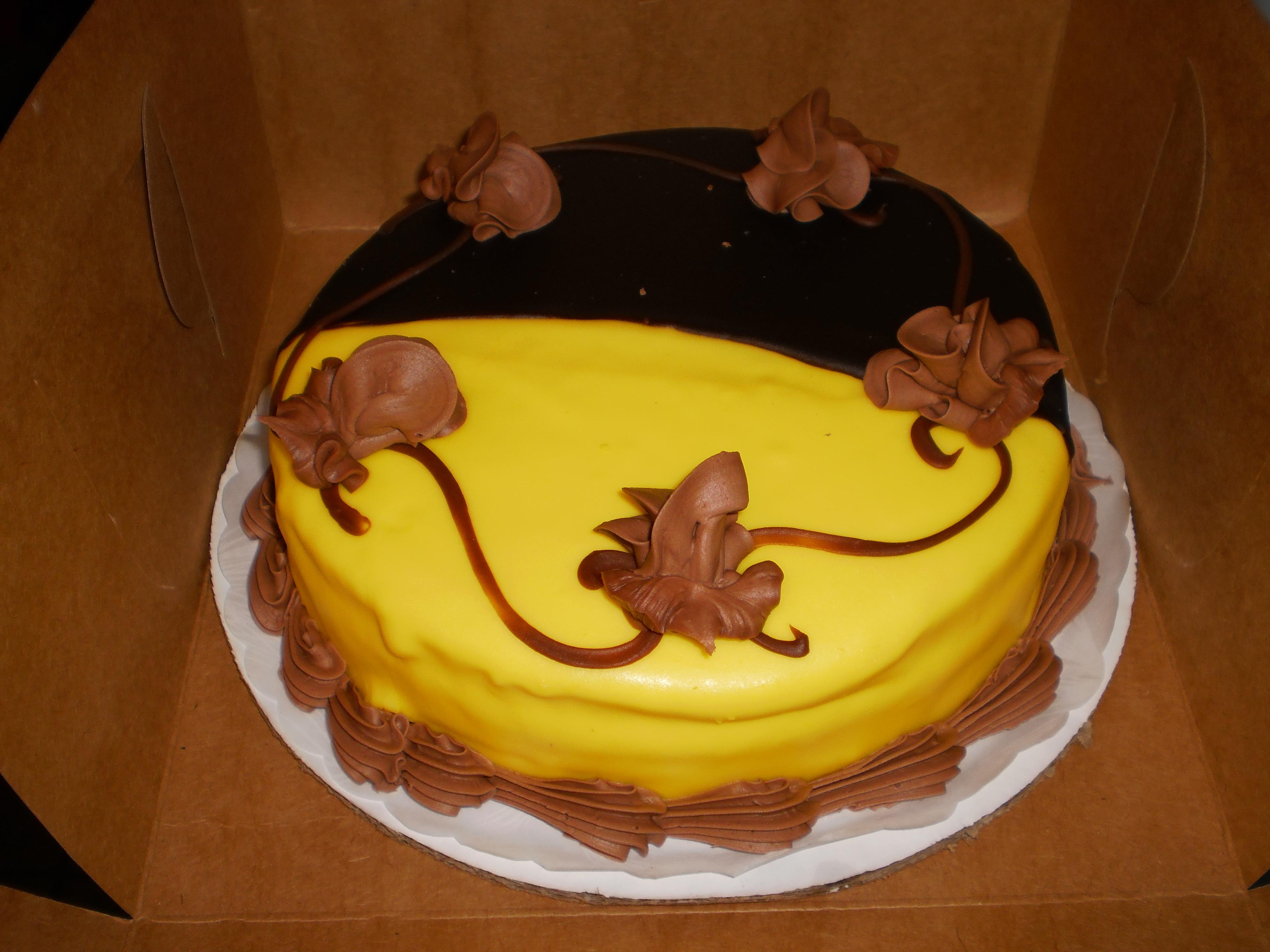
A doberge cake

=== Condiments and sauces ===
- Crystal Hot Sauce—a brand of hot sauce made with aged red cayenne peppers, distilled white vinegar, and salt
- Remoulade—a condiment invented in France that is usually aioli- or mayonnaise-based; although similar to tartar sauce, it is often more yellowish (or reddish in Louisiana), often flavored with curry, and sometimes contains chopped pickles or piccalilli
- Tabasco sauce—a brand of hot sauce made with aged tabasco peppers from Avery Island

=== Beverages ===
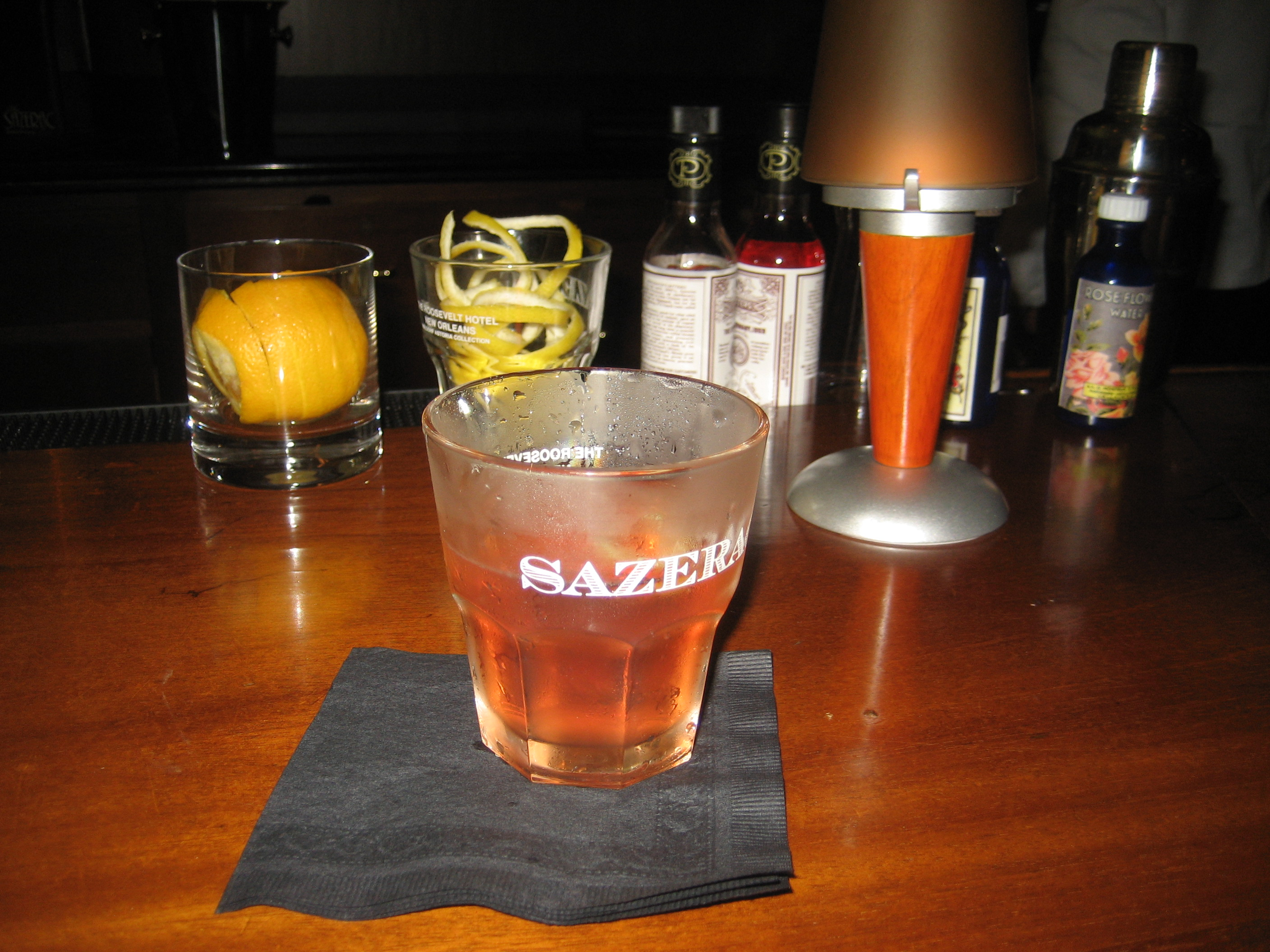
A Sazerac cocktail at the Sazerac bar, The Roosevelt New Orleans hotel, New Orleans

==== Alcoholic ====
- Abita beer—varieties include Amber, Jockamo IPA, Purple Haze, and Turbodog
- Dixie beer—founded in New Orleans in 1907; since Hurricane Katrina the beer has been contract brewed at other locations
- Hand Grenade—a trademarked, melon-flavored cocktail, sold in a translucent plastic container resembling an anthropomorphic hand grenade
- Herbsaint—a brand of anise-flavored liqueur, originally marketed as a substitute for absinthe
- Hurricane—a sweet cocktail made with rum, fruit juice, and passion fruit syrup or grenadine
- Milk punch—a cocktail made with brandy or bourbon, milk, sugar, and vanilla extract, with nutmeg sprinkled on top
- NOLA beer—made by the New Orleans Lager and Ale brewing company
- Peychaud's Bitters—a brand of bitters (a bitter-tasting, alcoholic ingredient in some cocktails) first made in New Orleans in the 1830s
- Ramos gin fizz—also known as a New Orleans fizz; a large, frothy cocktail invented in New Orleans in the 1880s; ingredients include gin, lemon juice, lime juice, egg white, sugar, cream, soda water, and orange flower water
- Sazerac—a cocktail made with rye or cognac, absinthe or Herbsaint, Peychaud's Bitters, and sugar
- Vieux Carré—a cocktail invented in the 1930s at the Carousel Piano Bar & Lounge; made with rye, cognac, vermouth, Bénédictine, Peychaud's Bitters, and Angostura bitters; the "Vieux Carré" (the "Old Square") is another name for the French Quarter

==== Non-alcoholic ====
- Café au lait—coffee with roasted chicory root and scalded milk, popularized in part by Café du Monde
- Delaware Punch—a brand of fruit-flavored, non-carbonated soft drink that is no longer produced
- Dr. Nut—a brand of sweet, almond-flavored soft drink, produced from the late 1930s to the early 1950s

== Companies ==
- Dorignac's Food Center—a historic food store on Veterans Memorial Boulevard in Metairie, Louisiana, near New Orleans, known for offering regional specialties
- Leidenheimer Baking Company—established in 1896, the bakery is best known for its French bread, used for po' boy sandwiches, and other local breads such as muffuletta and pistolettes
- Zatarain's—a food and spice company based in New Orleans, it produces Cajun and Creole cuisine related food items

== Restaurants and taverns ==
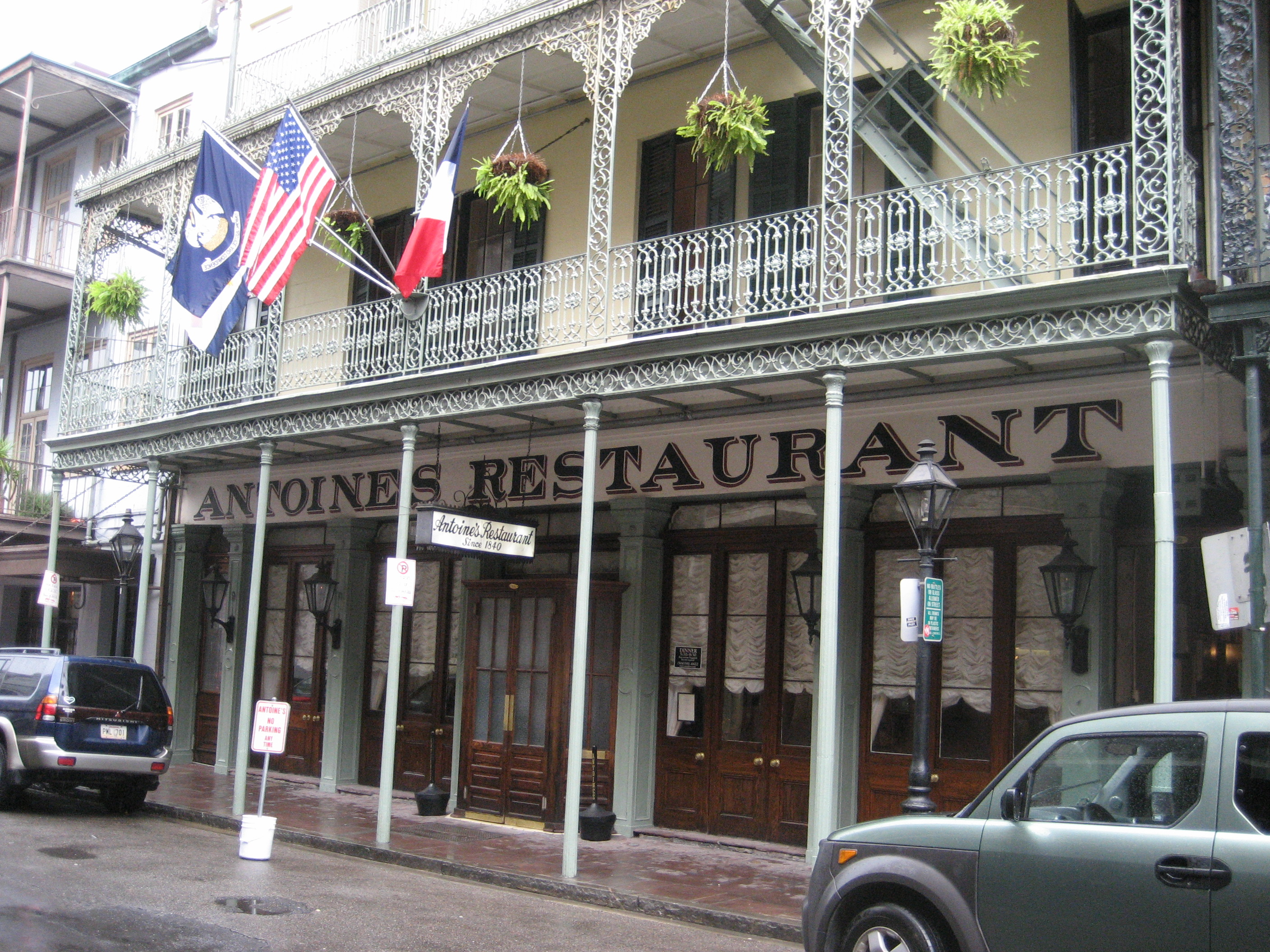
Antoine's restaurant is located in the French Quarter of New Orleans.

New Orleans has a very popular and varied restaurant scene.

Notable New Orleans dining and drinking establishments include:

- Angelo Brocato's
- Antoine's
- Arnaud's
- Breads On Oak
- Brennan's
- Broussard's
- Café du Monde
- Cafe Lafitte in Exile
- Café Reconcile
- Camellia Grill
- Carousel Piano Bar & Lounge
- Central Grocery
- Clancy's
- Commander's Palace
- Dickie Brennan's Steakhouse
- Domilise's Po-Boy and Bar
- Dong Phuong Oriental Bakery
- Dooky Chase's
- Emeril's
- Galatoire's
- Hansen's Sno-Bliz
- La Petite Grocery
- Mr. B's Bistro
- Napoleon House
- Pat O'Brien's Bar
- Snug Harbor
- Willie Mae's Scotch House

== The Picayune Creole Cook Book ==
The Picayune Creole Cook Book has been described as "an authentic and complete account of the Creole kitchen". It was published in 1900 during a time when former slaves and their descendants were moving North. Local newspapers warned that when the last of the "race of Creole cooks" left New Orleans "the secrets of the Louisiana Kitchen" would be lost.

The recipes published in the cook book were compiled by an unknown staffer at the Daily Picayune, who said the recipes came directly from "the old Creole 'mammies'". Since its publication it has been released in sixteen subsequent editions with very little alteration to the original recipes.

== See also ==
- Cajun cuisine
- Cuisine of the Southern United States
- American cuisine
- List of American regional and fusion cuisines
- List of regional dishes of the United States
- Louisiana Creole cuisine
