= Frozen cup =

Frozen cup may refer to:

- Frozen cup, a cup of a frozen liquid
- Huckabuck, a homemade frozen dessert from Southern American states
- Frozie cup, an Australian frozen dessert
