= Herbsaint =

Brand name of anise-flavored liquor

Herbsaint is a brand name of anise-flavored liqueur originally created as an absinthe substitute in New Orleans, Louisiana in 1934, and currently produced by the Sazerac Company.

It was developed by J. Marion Legendre and Reginald Parker of the city, who had learned how to make absinthe while in France during World War I. It was originally produced under the name "Legendre Absinthe", although it never contained absinthe's essential ingredient, grand wormwood (Artemisia absinthium). It first went on sale following the repeal of Prohibition, and was unique in its category as an absinthe substitute, as opposed to a pastis. The Federal Alcohol Control Administration soon objected to Legendre's use of the word "absinthe", so the name was changed to "Legendre Herbsaint", French/Creole for "Herbe Sainte" (Sacred Herb), the Artemisia absinthium.

The Sazerac Company bought J.M. Legendre & Co. in June 1949. Herbsaint was originally bottled at 120 proof (60%), but this was later reduced to 100 proof (50%), then changed to a different 90 proof (45%) recipe in the mid-1950s. By the early 1970s only the 90 proof remained. In December 2009, the Sazerac Company reintroduced J.M. Legendre's original 100 proof recipe as Herbsaint Original.

== See also ==
- Cuisine of New Orleans
