= Oysters Bienville =

Seafood recipe

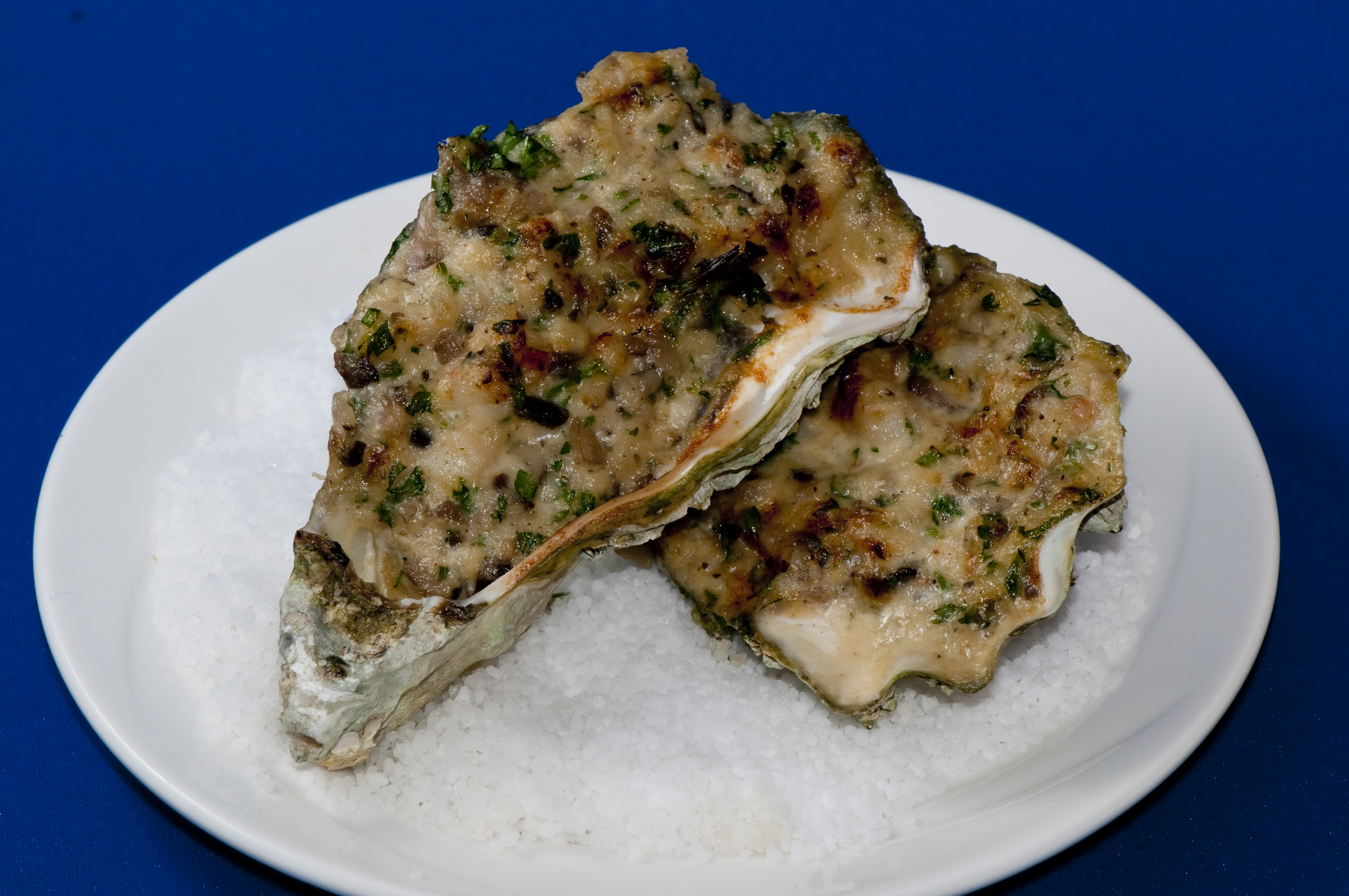
Oysters Bienville

Oysters Bienville is a traditional dish in New Orleans cuisine of baked oysters in a shrimp sauce. It is served at some of the city's renowned restaurants, originating at Arnaud's. Ingredients include shrimp, mushrooms, bell peppers, sherry, a roux with butter, Parmesan cheese and other lighter cheese, and bread crumbs. The oysters are baked in the shell or can be made in a small casserole dish or au gratin dish. The dish was named for Jean-Baptiste Le Moyne de Bienville (1680–1767), French governor of Louisiana and founder of New Orleans.

== See also ==
- List of seafood dishes
