= Dirty rice =

Traditional Louisiana Creole rice dish

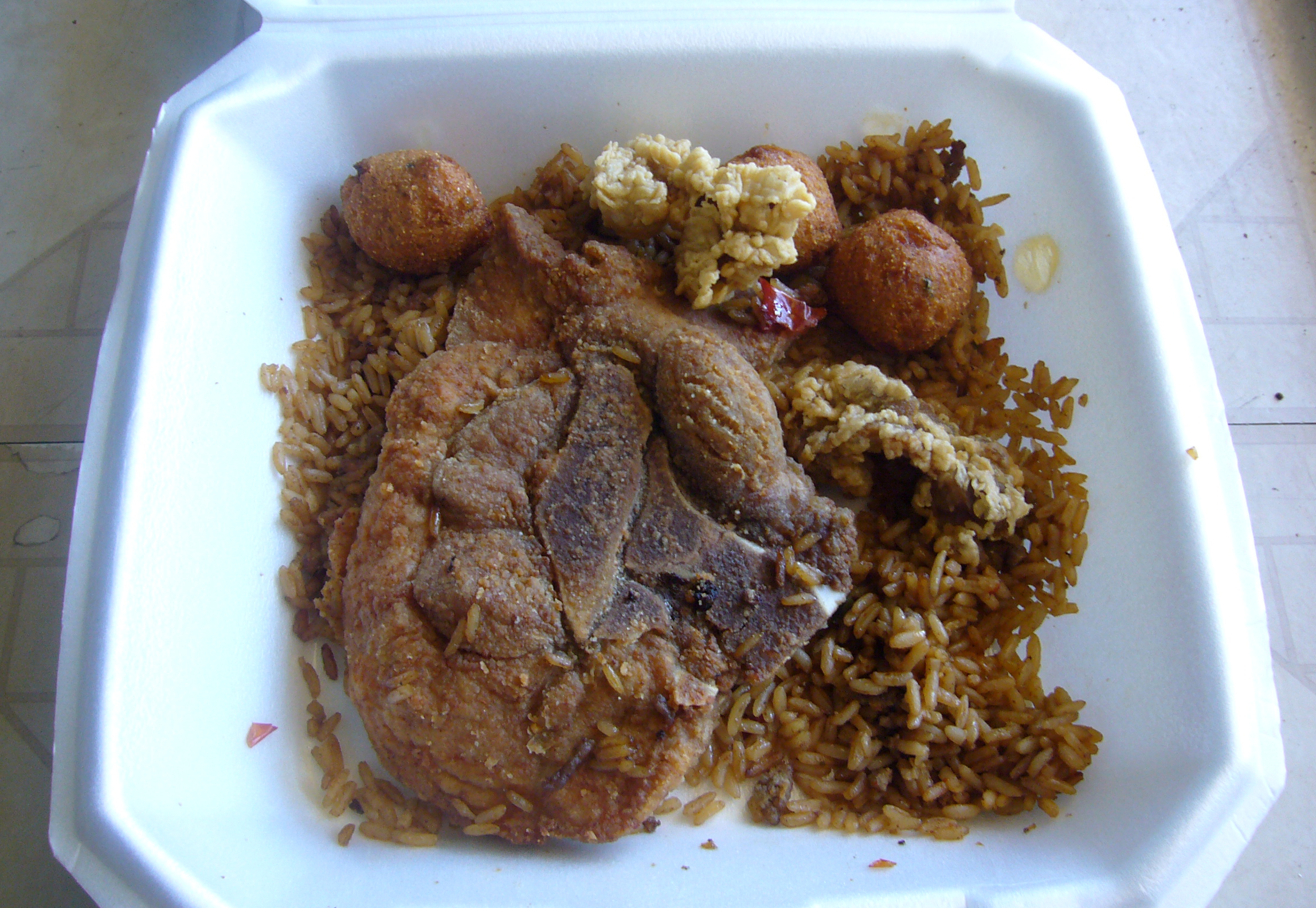
A pork chop served atop dirty rice

Dirty rice is a traditional Louisiana Creole dish made from white rice which gets a "dirty" color from being cooked with small pieces of pork, beef or chicken, green bell pepper, celery, and onion, and spiced with cayenne and black pepper. Parsley and chopped green onions are common garnishes. Dirty rice is most common in the Creole regions of southern Louisiana; however, it can also be found in other areas of the American South and referenced as "chicken and rice," "Cajun rice," or "rice dressing".

== Origins ==
The earliest versions of this dish trace back to the late 1700s in southern Louisiana and fall under the category of soul food.During this period, the individuals working the slave trade brought crops from black people and captives with the knowledge to cultivate them in the colonies. These crops included sweet potatoes, tomatoes, and beans.

Slaves from the coast of West Africa, who included rice in many aspects of their diets, were brought to Louisiana for their ability to cultivate the crop in the marshes and bayous. As a result, rice plantations became large and profitable institutions for Louisiana land owners. The plentiful nature of rice made it an inexpensive commodity allotted to slaves. Along with corn, beans, sorghum, succotash, and greens; rice was one of the limited foods enslaved people were allowed to eat on the plantation. Slaves were also given the "undesirable" cuts of the meat which would otherwise be thrown away by plantation owners. This generally included intestines, neck, feet, head, ears, ribcage, tail, and tongue of the hogs, cow, and chickens. Through these options, enslaved people adapted to create meals to feed themselves and their families.

The rice, combined with the organ meat provided by the slave owners, were the primary components of dirty rice. Often, the dish would be made with the hearts, livers, kidneys, gizzards, ribs, and feet of the plantation livestock provided to them. The meat would be cooked down first, then chopped into fine pieces while the rice cooked. Then, the rice would be mixed in with this meat mixture, and the broth-type "gravy" formed by the meat would give the rice its "dirty" appearance.

In the 1800s, harmful stereotypes emerged that associated black individuals with certain foods, such as fried chicken, chitterlings, watermelon, and dirty rice. These stereotypes had complex origins, but the American Civil War played a significant role in their creation. These negative ideals were reinforced through offensive portrayals in popular culture, such as minstrel shows and commercial branding.

== Variations ==
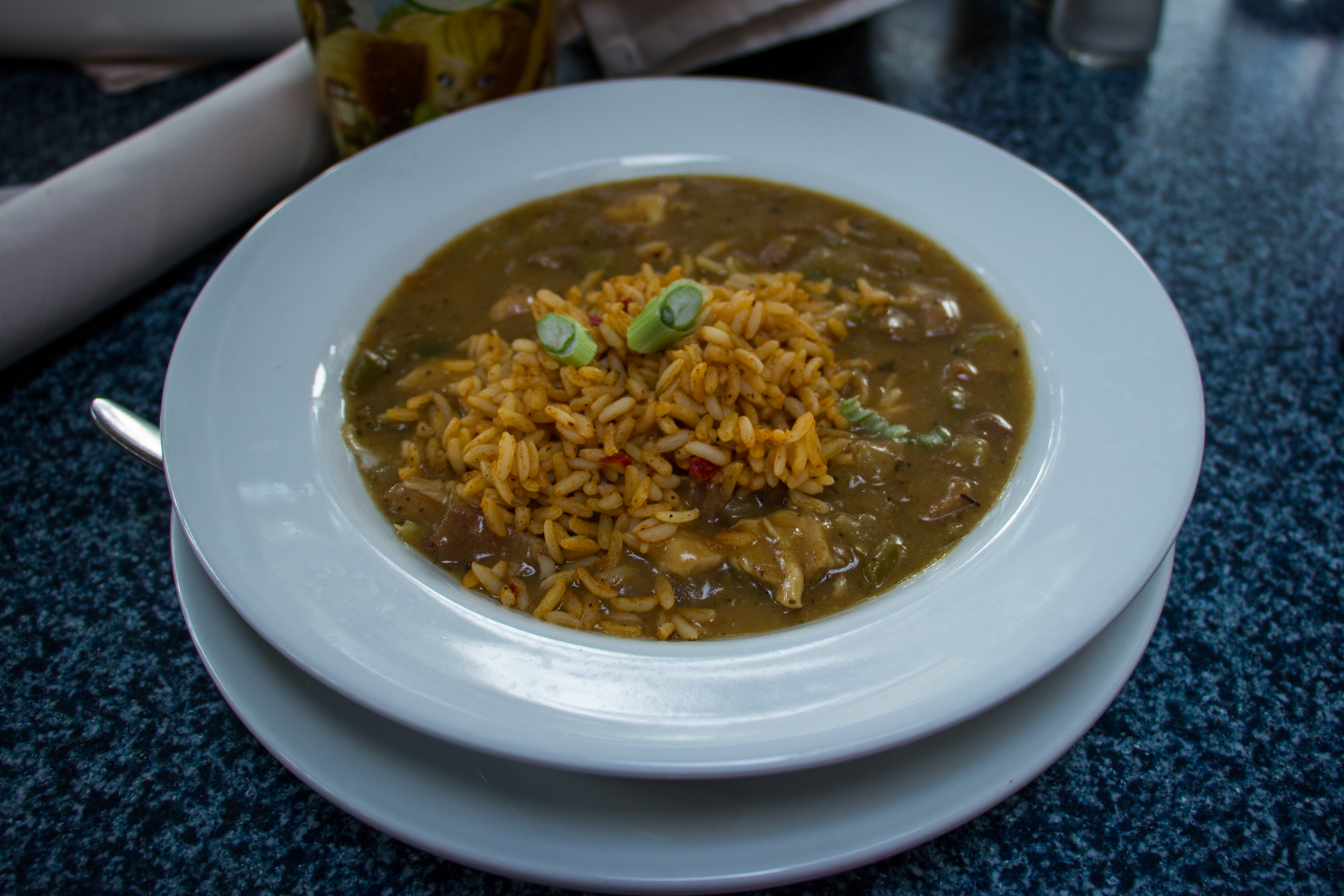
New Orleans gumbo served with dirty rice.

After the abolition of slavery in the late 1800s, the dish remained a traditional meal of the freed African Americans due to its affordable and easy-to-make nature. It was later adopted as a "poor man's meal" by the poor White and the Acadian "Cajun" immigrants who also populated the lower class of Southern Louisiana. These individuals would have their own farms and hunt for wild game, allowing them to make simple meals such as this one to feed their families. Thus, the dish continued to be one associated with poverty. However, as these individuals gained more wealth and with it, access to better ingredients, the recipe saw more expensive additions being incorporated, such as Andouille sausage and ground beef instead of chicken livers and pig intestines. They would also include additional spices, such as bay leaves, garlic, and cayenne pepper.

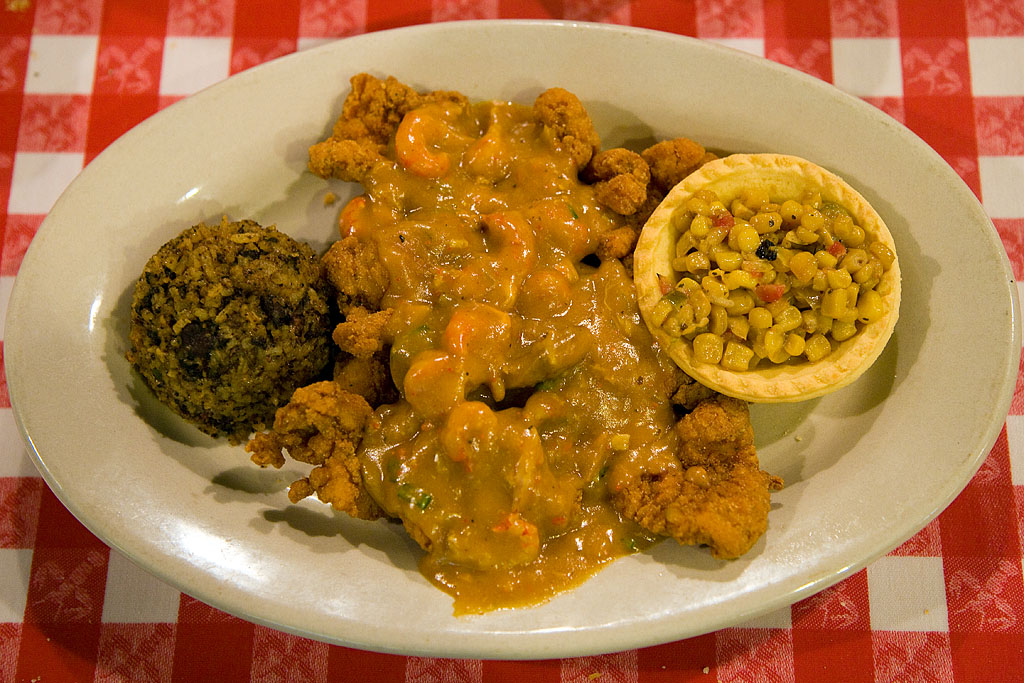
Dirty rice (left) served alongside fried alligator

As a result, the recipe for dirty rice is one that adapts to the means of the cook and the available ingredients on hand. While ground meat and rice are the two most consistent ingredients, the types of meat vary, and a blend of vegetables such as peppers and onions are often included. The way the dish is seasoned can also vary from simple salt and black pepper, to a more elaborate blend of herbs, spices, hot sauces, and aromatics.

A well-known variation of this rice dish is another Cajun staple, jambalaya.

=== Modern variants ===
In the wake of healthy eating initiatives, the recipe has experienced some health-conscious variations that include using ground turkey over pork, as well as cooking the dish in vegetable oils instead of oils heavy in trans fats. Additionally, the addition organ meat has largely been substituted with prime cuts of ground beef, chicken and pork.

== Other names ==
Dirty rice is frequently referred to as Cajun Rice in Louisiana and other parts of the South due to the dish's history with the Acadian immigrants of Louisiana. Cajun rice typically incorporates Andouille sausage, bell pepper, celery, and onions along with a blend of traditional Cajun spices. In some southern regions, it is also called rice dressing. Rice dressing may be prepared using ground beef or ground pork, rather than chicken liver and giblets.

== Popularity ==
Despite its meager origins, dirty rice is considered a staple dish in the American South as an example of "authentic" Louisiana, Creole, and Cajun cooking. The dish is served as a main course as well as a side, and is often served alongside other traditional Louisianan dishes, including étouffée and gumbo to name a few. Prepackaged mixes of the rice, vegetables and spices are sold in grocery stores by brands such as Zatarain's, Tony Chachere's, and Louisiana Fish Fry Products —all brands that cater towards traditional Louisiana cuisine. It is a dish commonly served in Louisiana tourist spots and cooked by popular chefs, including celebrity chef and New Orleans restaurateur Emeril Lagasse. It is a well-known dish served in regions across the South.

== See also ==
- List of rice dishes
- Cajun cuisine
- Soul food
