= Arnaud's =

Restaurant in New Orleans, Louisiana, U.S.

Coordinates: 29.955721°N 90.068757°W

Arnaud's Restaurant
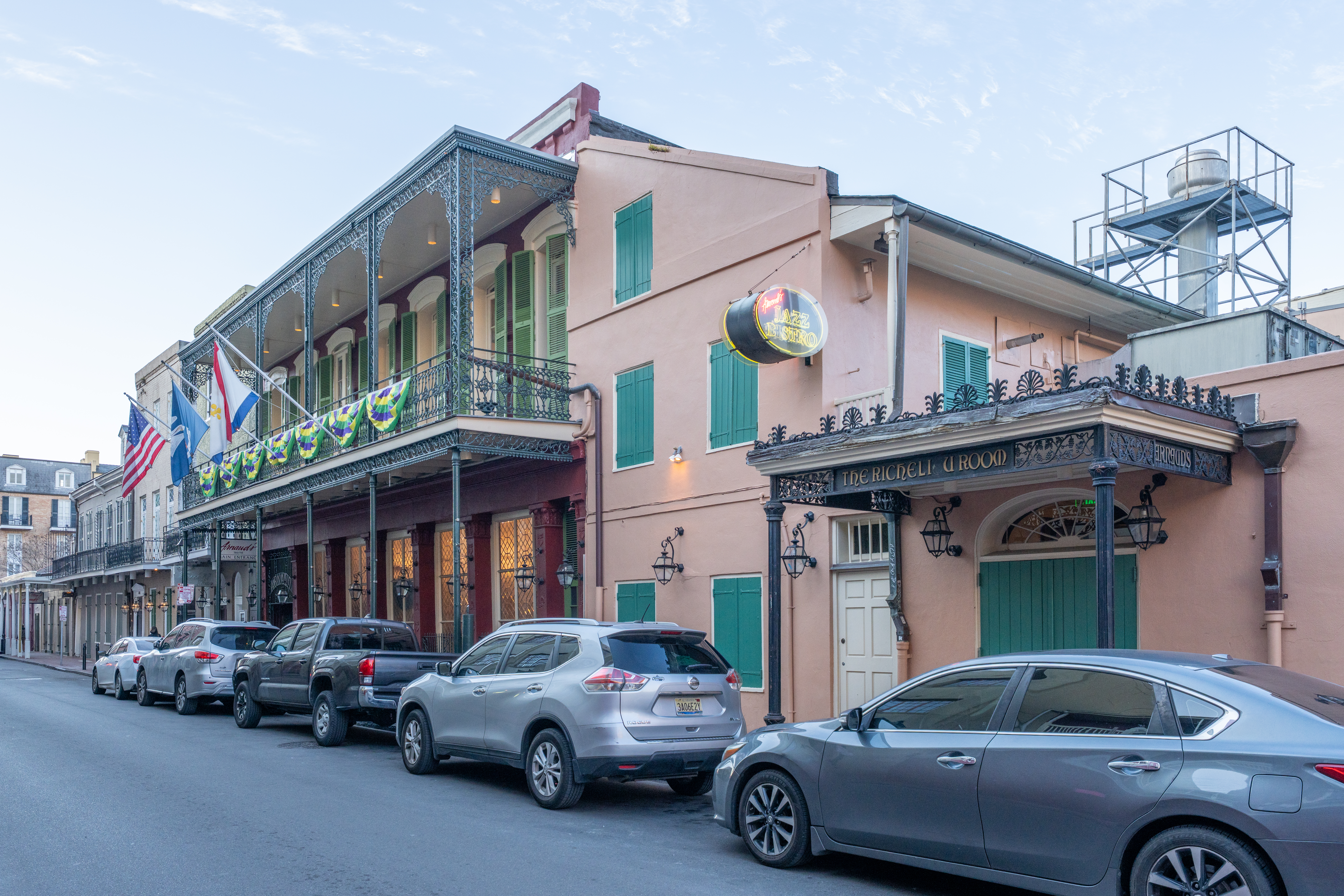
- Arnaud's Restaurant as seen from Bienville Street (2026)
- Interactive map of Arnaud's Restaurant

Restaurant information
- Established: 1918
- Owners: Archie Casbarian; Katy Casbarian
- Previous owners: Arnaud Cazenave; Germaine Wells
- Head chef: Tommy DiGiovanni
- Food type: Louisiana Creole
- Dress code: Business casual
- Location: 813 Bienville Street, New Orleans, Louisiana, 70112, United States
- Website: www.arnaudsrestaurant.com

Arnaud's is a restaurant in the French Quarter of New Orleans, Louisiana, specializing in Louisiana Creole cuisine. Established in 1918, it is one of the older and more famous restaurants in the city. The restaurant also houses a museum of the New Orleans Mardi Gras.

== History ==
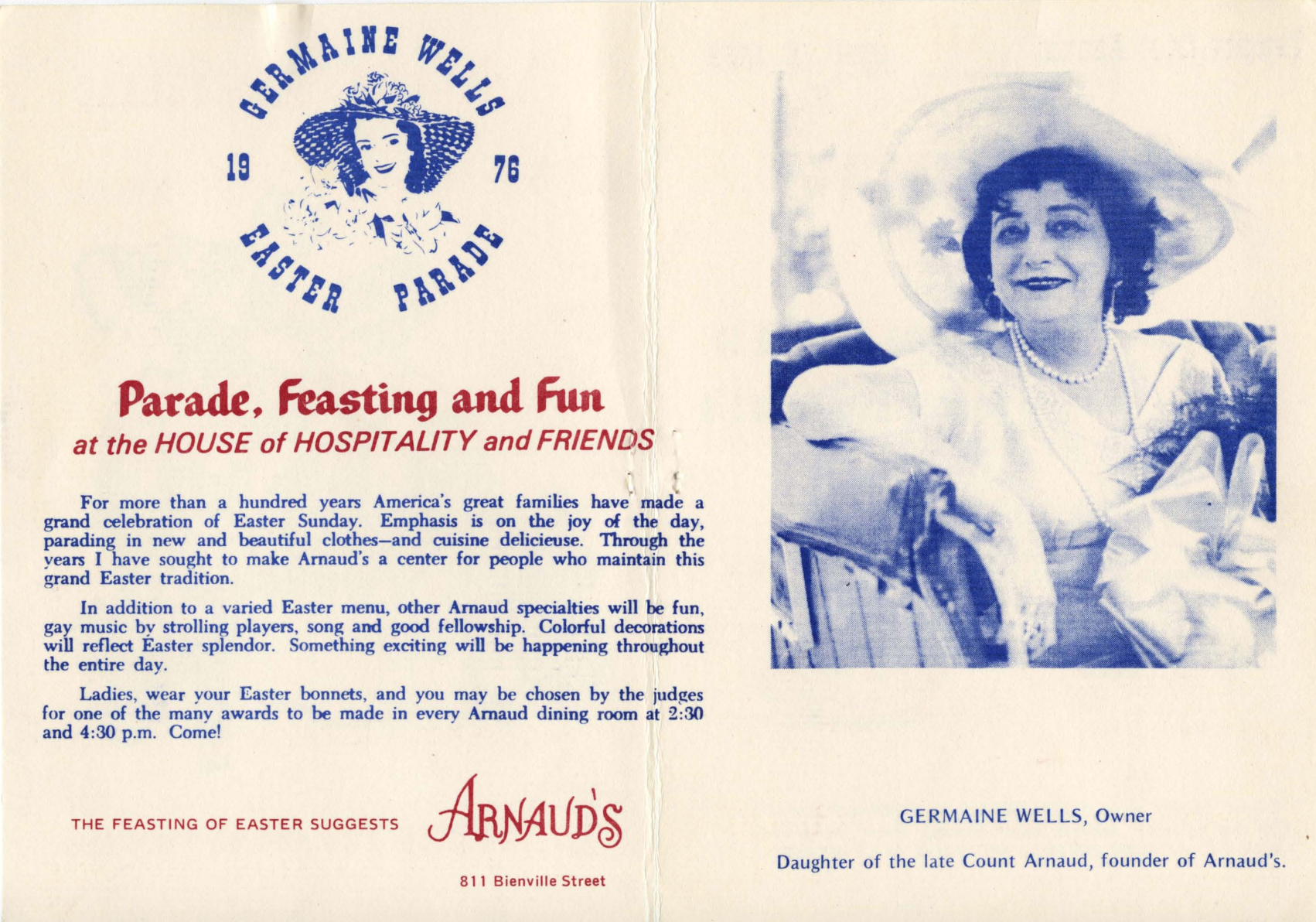
Germaine Wells of Arnaud's began leading the French Quarter Easter parade in 1956

Arnaud's was founded in 1918 by a French wine salesman, Arnaud Cazenave. He had immigrated to New Orleans in 1902 from France by way of New York City in the early 20th century. Cazenave came to New Orleans with the intent of offering fine food and wine to the local people. He acquired multiple adjacent properties on Bienville Street in the New Orleans French Quarter, thereby establishing a large restaurant.

Cazenave's daughter Germaine Wells took over management of Arnaud's as of his death in 1948. During the period of Wells's ownership, she maintained the restaurant practices established by her father. In 1957, she was recognized by the National Restaurant Association for her hospitality as a restaurateur.

In 1978, 60 years after the restaurant first opened, Archie Casbarian and his wife Jane Casbarian acquired management of Arnaud's, initially as a lease. The Casbarians had considerable experience in the hospitality industry. By that time, Arnaud's had deteriorated significantly from neglect, and the Casbarian family restored the restaurant to then contemporary standards while retaining its original appeal. These renovations included both physical changes to the building and updating and improving the menu. To finance the renovations, the new owners sold timeshare rights to tables at the restaurant. In these agreements, for US $10,000, buyers received US $12,000 in food and drink credit at the restaurant. They also received a guarantee that their table would be available within 30 minutes of contacting the restaurant, and their names were permanently memorialized in a wall at the restaurant. These changes brought the restaurant positive recognition and widespread approval and restored the restaurant's elegance. The timeshare arrangement also created a sense of ownership among some of the clientele.

At the same time that Arnaud's was undergoing restoration and modernization, the new owners updated their offerings of Louisiana Creole cuisine and introduced their own versions of classic creole recipes. As they assessed their offerings, they used local creole chef and restaurateur Warren Leruth as a consultant.

Under the terms of the lease of the restaurant by the Casbarians, Germaine Wells continued to live in an apartment within the restaurant buildings. At the same time, she exerted some influence over restaurant management. The Casbarians acquired full ownership of Arnaud's at the time of Wells's death in 1983.

Arnaud's restaurant was one of the first local restaurants to reopen after Hurricane Katrina, which caused great damage in the Greater New Orleans area in August 2005, re-opening in November 2005.

As of 2014 Arnaud's is run by the fourth generation of the Casbarian family, which are siblings Katy Casbarian and Archie Casbarian, as well as their mother Jane Casbarian. The family retains the style of its founder, Arnaud Cazenave.

In 2018 Arnaud's publicly celebrated its centenary.

== Contemporary restaurant ==
Arnaud's serves classic Louisiana Creole food. The restaurant has fourteen named dining rooms: Mezzanine, Creole Cottage, Bourbon Suites, Edison Park, 1920, Iberville, Bienville, Toulouse, Dauphine, Lafitte, Bacchus, Gold, Irma, and Count's. Each room is furnished with a variety of antiques, chandeliers, and drapes that are suggestive of the early 20th century environment in which Cazenave first established the restaurant. The restaurant has a dining capacity of up to 220 customers. (Note: Another source states that Arnaud's can serve up to 1000 customers at once.) Arnaud's has six menus: À La Carte Dinner Menu, Sunday Brunch and Jazz Menu, French 75 Menu, Table d'Hôte Menu, Dessert Menu, and Speakeasy. The dress code at Arnaud's is business casual. The restaurant employs approximately 220 people.

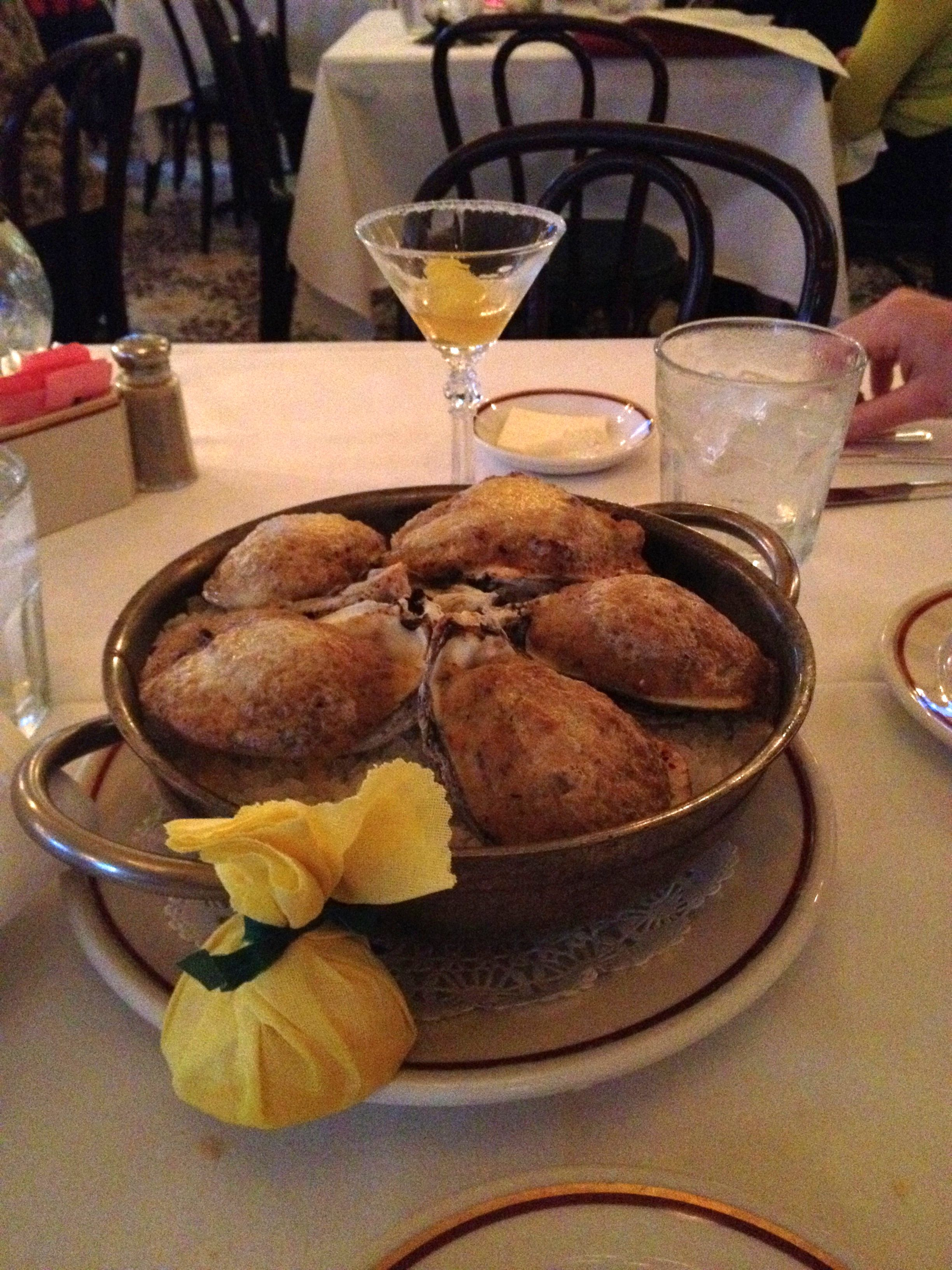
Oysters Bienville at Arnaud's Jazz Bistro

Arnaud's is well-known for its oyster dishes. In 1956, The New York Times published Arnaud's recipe for Oysters Bienville, the recipe having been given to The New York Times by Arnaud's proprietor Germaine Wells.

Arnaud's signature dishes are also served at a more family-friendly cafe, "Remoulade", located nearby on Bourbon Street, also within the New Orleans French Quarter.

As of 2014 the executive chef at Arnaud's is New Orleans local Tommy DiGiovanni. A recipe of DiGiovanni's from Arnaud's for cornish game hen was published. Kit Wohl authored a cookbook based on Arnaud's restaurant recipes. Food journalist John DeMers authored a book describing the history of Arnaud's and some of its more unique recipes.

=== Bar ===
Since Arnaud's founding, the restaurant has always had a bar for serving alcoholic beverages. The bar remained open surreptitiously during the time of the American prohibition. At times, the bar was strictly for men-only. It was known for part of its history as the Richelieu Bar. During the 1978 renovation of Arnaud's, the Richelieu Bar remained open to regular customers, who could then observe the progress of the renovation.

More recently, Arnaud's established the French 75 Bar, located next to the main dining room. The bar reverted to its original name, French 75 Bar, after being renovated in 2003.

Arnaud's French 75 won the James Beard Award for outstanding bar program. In 2010, Esquire magazine included the French 75 bar as one of its 15 recommended bars worthy of a visit as a destination.

=== Museum ===
Germaine Wells, the long time owner of Arnaud's, was active in the New Orleans Mardi Gras, serving as queen of several krewes, among other responsibilities. She accumulated a collection of Mardi Gras costumes, especially her own. At the time of the renovation of Arnaud's restaurant in 1978, the Casenave family, as the new managers of the restaurant, discovered Well's collection which were in storage at the restaurant. In homage to Wells, the Casenave family opened the Germaine Cazenave Wells Mardi Gras Museum in 1983. The museum contains Mardi Gras artifacts that were all accumulated by Germaine Wells. The museum is housed within Arnaud's restaurant.

== See also ==
External media
- Media links for Arnaud's Restaurant
- Inside Arnaud’s Restaurant: A Historic Taste Of New Orleans & A Secret Mardi Gras Museum, video by Forbes
- Video tour of Arnaud's restaurant kitchen, by the restaurant's saucier

- List of Louisiana Creole restaurants
- List of oyster bars
