= Frozie cup =

Frozen dessert

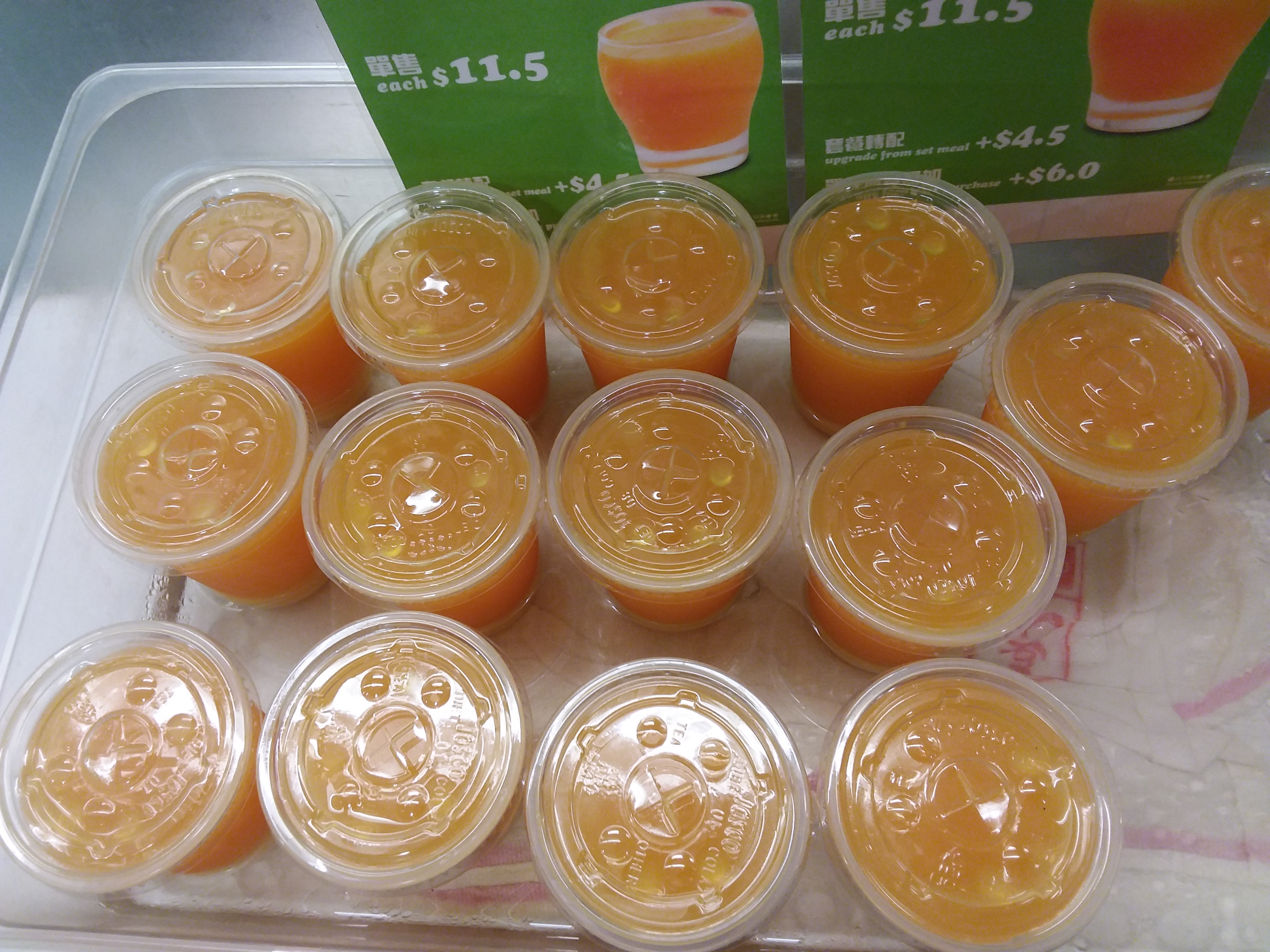
- Frozies made with orange juice
- Alternative names: Frozie, frozy, frozen cup, cold cup, ice cup, icy cup, ice-breaker
- Course: Dessert
- Place of origin: Australia

A Frozie cup (also frozie ~, frozy ~, or frozen cup, "cold cup", "ice cup" or "icy cup") is a simple Australian frozen dessert, often sold for school or community group fundraising.

A frozie cup consists simply of frozen cordial in paper, plastic or styrofoam cup. The block of ice is sometimes inverted in the cup when sold.

Frozie cups are sold at Australian canteens/tuck shops for approximately $1 AUD.

Some frozie cups are milk-based or ice cream based.

Frozie cups are also used around the world as a substitute for an ice pop. Often using sugar-based drinks such as Kool-Aid for flavor.

Frozie cups are well known in New Orleans.

== First aid ==
Water-only ice cups may also be used as a simple means of icing sports injuries.

== See also ==
- Huckabuck
