= Étouffée =

American seafood and rice dish

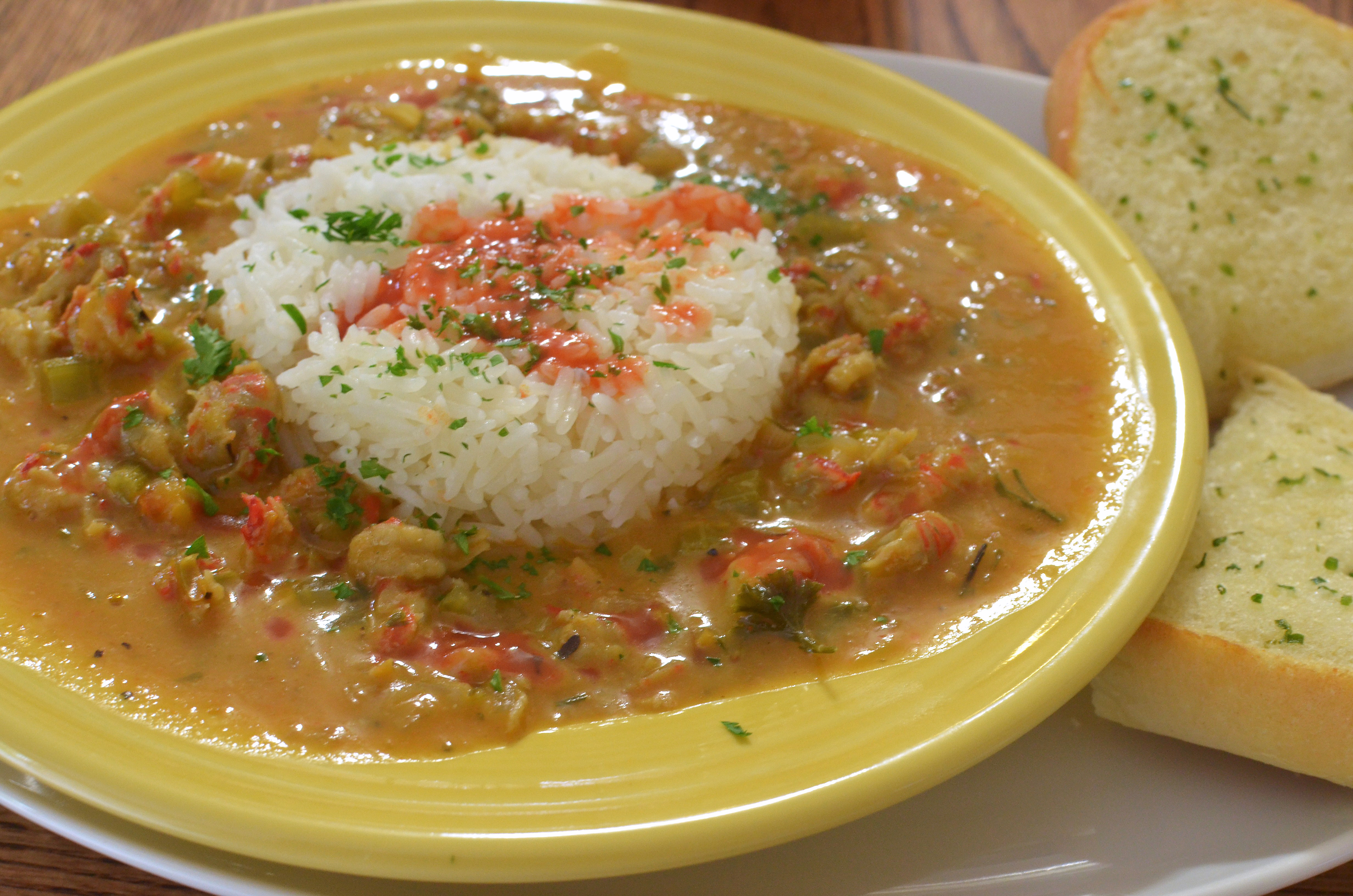
- Crawfish étouffée, served at a restaurant in New Orleans
- Type: Stew
- Course: Main
- Place of origin: United States
- Region or state: Louisiana
- Main ingredients: Shellfish, rice

Étouffée or etouffee (French: [e.tu.fe], English: /ˌeɪtuːˈfeɪ/ AY-too-FAY) is a dish found in both Cajun and Creole cuisine typically served with shellfish over rice. The dish employs a technique known as smothering, a popular method of cooking in the Cajun and Creole areas of south Louisiana. Étouffée is most popular in New Orleans and in the Acadiana region as well as the coastal counties of Mississippi, Alabama, northern Florida, and eastern Texas.

== Etymology ==
In French, the word 'étouffée' literally means 'smothered', 'stifled' or 'suffocated', from the verb 'étouffer'.

== Description ==
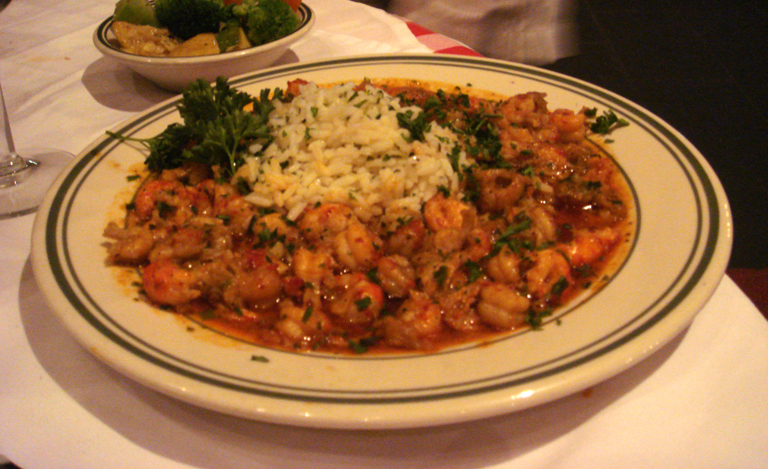
Another version of crawfish étouffée

Étouffée is most commonly made with crab, shrimp or crawfish. Depending on who is making it and where it is being made it is flavored with either Creole or Cajun seasonings. Although Creole and Cajun cuisines are distinct, there are many similarities.

In the case of the Creole version of crawfish étouffée, it is made with a blond or brown roux and sometimes tomatoes are added. A blond roux is one that is cooked, stirring constantly, for approximately five minutes to remove the "raw" flavor of the flour and to add a slightly "nutty" flavor, while a brown roux is cooked longer (30 to 35 minutes) in order to deepen the color and flavor.

== History ==
Around the 1950s, crawfish étouffée was introduced to restaurant goers in Breaux Bridge, Louisiana; however, the dish may have been invented as early as the late 1920s, according to some sources. Originally, crawfish étouffée was a popular dish amongst Cajuns in the bayous and backwaters of Louisiana.

== In popular culture ==
- "Étouffée" is the sixth track on Vince Staples's 2024 album Dark Times. The bounce-influenced song contains numerous references to the New Orleans hip-hop scene.
- In the King of the Hill episode A Beer Can Named Desire, Bobby Hill attempts to order étouffée from room service at a hotel in Louisiana.

== See also ==
- List of rice dishes
- List of stews
