= Café Reconcile =

Cafe Reconcile
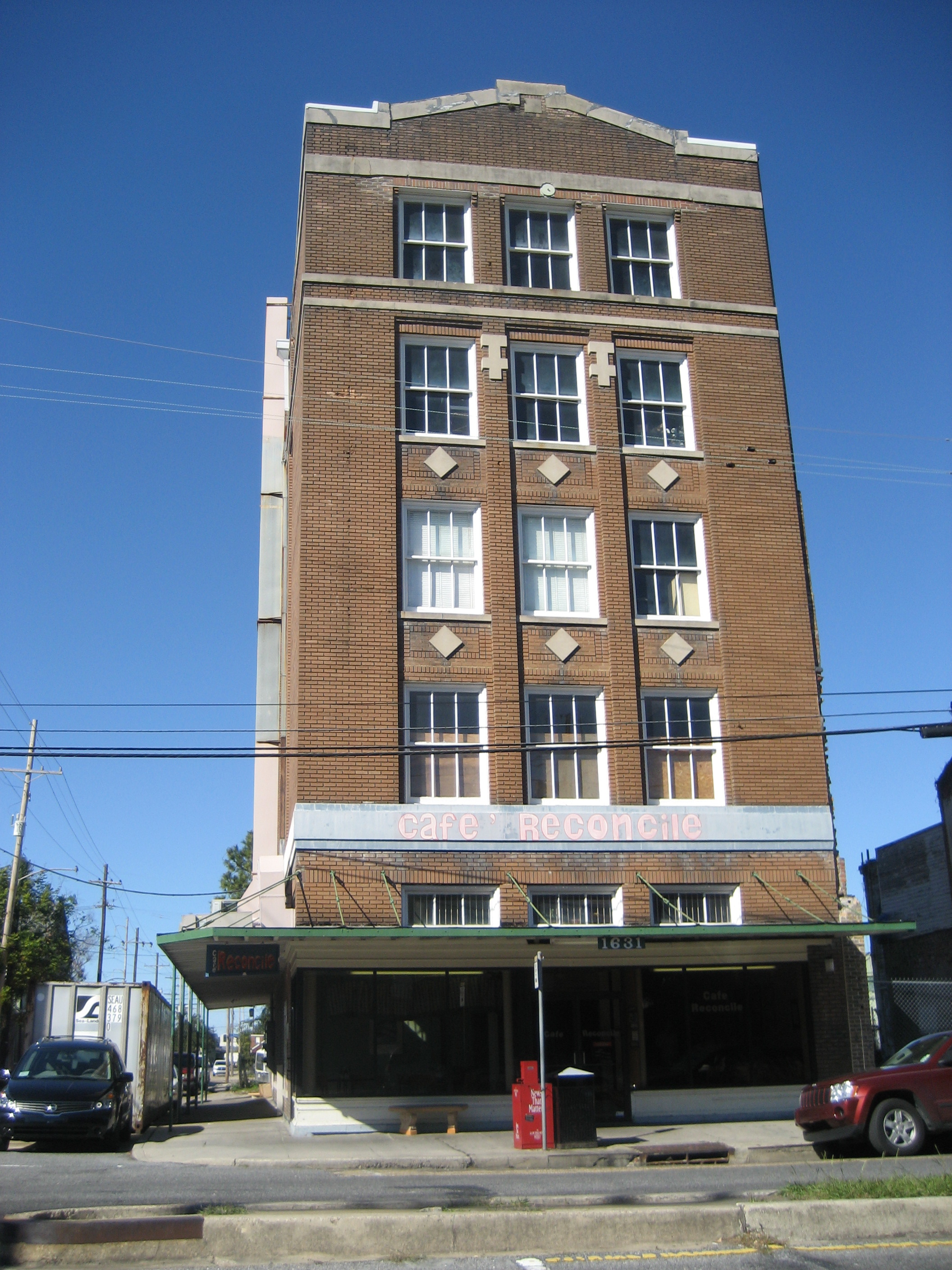
- Cafe Reconcile's historic location in Central City, New Orleans
- Interactive map of Cafe Reconcile

Restaurant information
- Established: 1996
- Location: 1631 Oretha Castle Haley Boulevard, Central City of New Orleans, Louisiana, 70113, United States
- Coordinates: 29.9398°N 90.0803°W
- Website: Official Site

Café Reconcile is a non-profit organization and restaurant in Central City area of New Orleans, Louisiana, United States. It was founded in 1996 by Craig Cuccia and Rev. Harry Tompson, S.J. and provides culinary and life skills training for at risk youth, allowing them to enter the hospitality and entertainment industry of New Orleans.

According to their website, "In the first four years of operation, Reconcile New Orleans’ Youth Workforce training program has successfully enrolled over 250 youth between the ages of 16 and 25 to learn basic life skills, interpersonal skills and work skills to enable and empower them to successfully enter the second-largest non-governmental workforce in New Orleans – the entertainment and hospitality industry." Also, their stated mission is "to provide at-risk youth an opportunity to learn life and interpersonal skills and operational training for successful entry into the hospitality and restaurant industries; to provide an economic development cornerstone for the blighted and declining but slowly returning Central City neighborhood, and to provide services to address unmet neighborhood needs (such as quality family-based literacy instruction for adults and children) until such time as other local organizations can establish their own programs in the community."

== Sources ==
- https://web.archive.org/web/20080723125235/http://www.cafereconcile.com/index.asp
- https://web.archive.org/web/20060715004519/http://www.archdiocese-no.org/cafe%20reconcile.htm
- https://web.archive.org/web/20110520012050/http://marketplace.publicradio.org/display/web/2007/01/05/off_the_streets_into_cafeacute_reconcile/
- https://web.archive.org/web/20120212183233/http://www.dhs.gov/xnews/releases/pr_1213295636120.shtm
- http://blog.nola.com/dining/2008/03/40_chefs_jackets_given_to_stud.html
- https://web.archive.org/web/20090818175907/http://www.companysj.com/v211/cafereconcile.htm
- https://web.archive.org/web/20080708214732/http://www.bestofneworleans.com/dispatch/2004-06-22/restreview.html
- http://blog.nola.com/tpmoney/2008/06/new_north_carolina_restaurant.html
- Southern Living. October 2007.
- http://www.zagat.com/Verticals/PropertyDetails.aspx?VID=8&R=57667
- http://www.catholicdigest.com/article/craig-cuccia-cofounder-and-executive-director-caf-reconcile-new-orleans-louisiana
- http://www.usccb.org/cchd/povertyusa/portrait_reconcile.htm
- https://web.archive.org/web/20080724221844/http://www.companymagazine.org/v211/cafereconcile.htm
