= Breads On Oak =

Bakery in New Orleans, Louisiana, U.S.

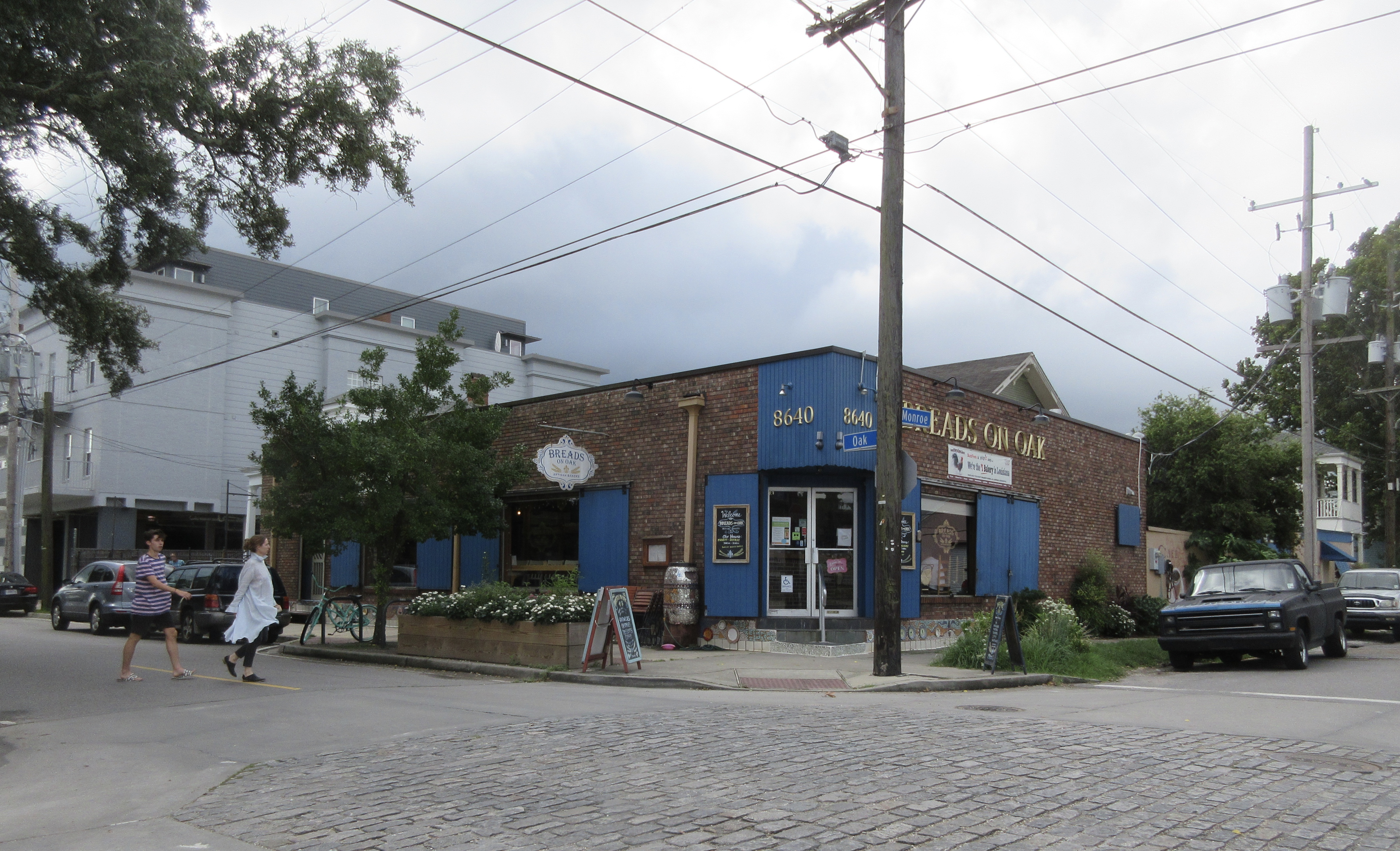
- Interactive map of Breads On Oak

Restaurant information
- Established: 2012
- Owners: Sean and Chamain O'Mahony
- Food type: Vegan
- Dress code: Casual
- Location: New Orleans, Orleans, Louisiana, U.S.
- Coordinates: 29.9510°N 90.1349°W
- Reservations: No
- Website: breadsonoak.com

Breads on Oak is a bakery and café in New Orleans, Louisiana, in the United States that specializes in organic ingredients, breads, vegan cuisine, and a café style menu of breakfast and lunch food offerings. There are two locations, the original bakery on Oak Street and a second location on Carondelet Street, which opened in 2020. Upon its opening in 2012, Breads on Oak was the first bakery and café in New Orleans to use only organic ingredients.

== History ==
Sean and Chamain O'Mahony founded Breads on Oak in 2012. Sean O'Mahony was born in New Orleans. After serving in the United States Marines, he worked at a bakery in Utah. He studied baking at the French Pastry School and decided to return to New Orleans to open a French-style bakery. The bakery is located in a former appliance store. Chamain is vegan, which led to the O'Mahonys offering a small selection of vegan items on their menu. Starting in 2018, they expanded to offer an entirely plant-based menu.

In 2016, VegNews named Breads on Oak's Boston Cream Stuffed Brioche one of the 50 best vegan desserts in the United States. That same year, the bakery was robbed at gunpoint. The suspect robbed the register and four customers. The following year, in 2017, the bakery was named the best bakery in Louisiana on Yelp. Eater named Breads On Oak one of the best vegan restaurants in New Orleans in 2019.

In January 2020, Breads On Oak opened a second location on Carondelet Street, connected to a Hampton by Hilton. A few months later, the new location was temporarily closed and the Oak Street location shifted to take out only due to COVID-19.

== Cuisine ==
Breads On Oak specializes in breads and vegan cuisine. They use organic ingredients, including flour, and source locally much of their produce, including growing their own fruits and herbs. They make six types of bread: miche, multigrain, fruit and nut, olive, baguettes, and ciabatta. Their baked goods include vegan king cakes, with optional "adult king cakes" that are filled with liquor-based creams. Breads on Oak also makes brioche filled with vanilla cream with chocolate ganache on top; chocolate chip walnut flax cookies, gluten free brownies, muffins, and vegan croissants.

The café menu, which is the same at both locations, serves breakfast all day and lunch items. It includes biscuit sandwiches, quiche, salads, burgers and crab cakes made with hearts of palm and chickpeas. They also offer a vegan version of a muffuletta called a "muffanada".
