= Hansen's Sno-Bliz =

Coordinates: 29.9169°N 90.1059°W

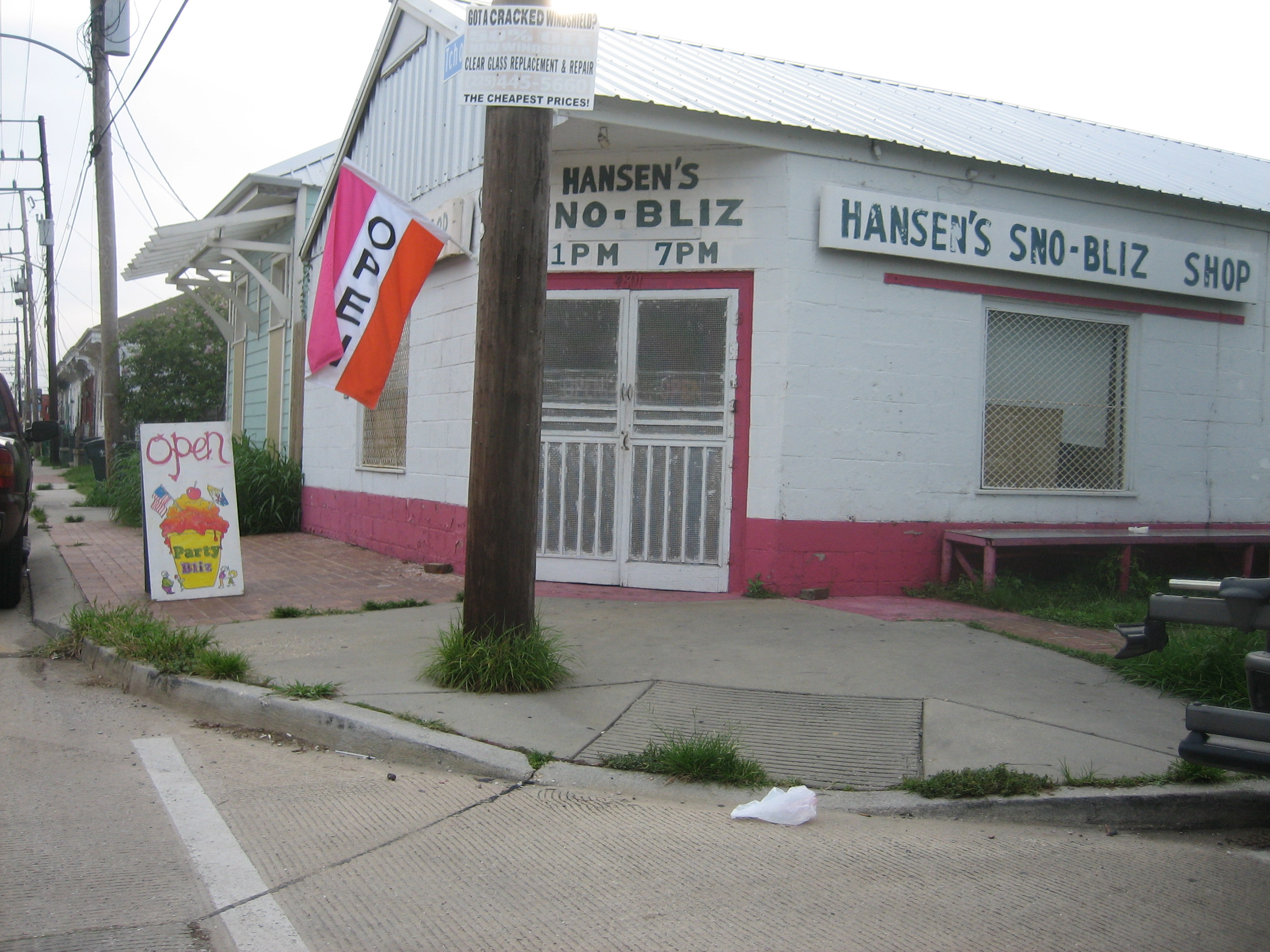
- Hansen's Sno-Bliz
- Interactive map of Hansen's Sno-Bliz

Restaurant information
- Established: 1934
- Owner: Ashley Hansen
- Food type: American
- Dress code: Casual
- Location: 4801 Tchoupitoulas Street, New Orleans, Louisiana, 70115, United States
- Website: www.snobliz.com

Hansen's Sno-Bliz is a snowball stand located in New Orleans, Louisiana, U.S.A., on Tchoupitoulas Street at Bordeaux Street.

It opened in 1934 and is believed to be the oldest sno-ball stand in the United States using Ernest Hansen's hand crafted Electric machine. Although earlier, Walther Gardens (Baltimore, 1928) uses a hand crank or hand shaver. Hansen's Sno-Bliz has been operated continuously by the Hansen family. After Hurricane Katrina and the subsequent death of founders Ernest and Mary Hansen, the shop closed for some time before being reopened by their granddaughter Ashley Hansen, in early summer of 2006. The shop is open annually from March to October.

In 2014, Hansen's received an America's Classics award at the James Beard Foundation Awards.

Sno-balls in Louisiana are similar to what the rest of the country calls snow cones, but they are made with more-finely-shaved ice and a large variety of homemade syrups.

== The Ice Shaving Machine ==
Ernest Hansen built Hansen's ice-shaving machine himself, entitled the "Sno-Bliz" in the 1930s. It was the first ever block-ice shaver. The U.S. government granted the patent in 1950.

The main machine currently in use today was built by Ernest Hansen in 1939.
