= Huckabuck =

American homemade frozen dessert popular in the Southern states

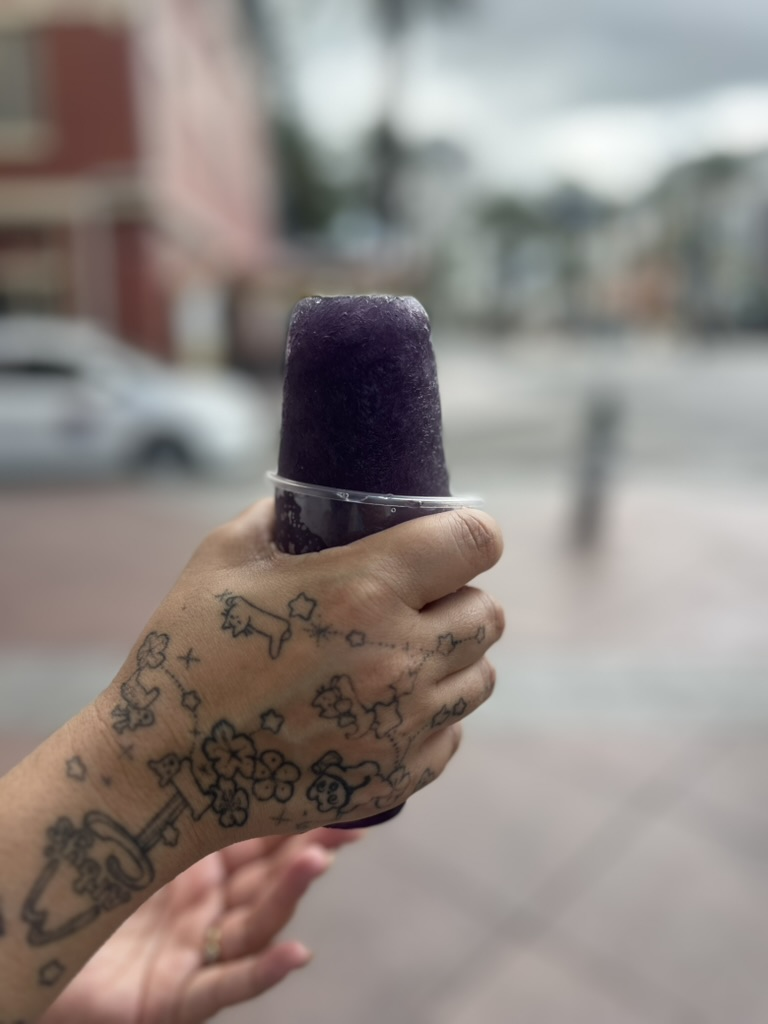
- Alternative names: Hucklebuck
- Course: Dessert
- Place of origin: United States
- Region or state: Louisiana and Georgia
- Main ingredients: Sweet liquid

A huckabuck, or hucklebuck, is a homemade frozen dessert from American Southern states, particularly in Louisiana and Georgia. It consists of a paper cup that is filled with some sort of sweet liquid (such as Kool-Aid) and frozen. The treat is also known as a “cool cup”, "frozen cup", or "honey dipper", with any name including cup referring to the paper, plastic, or styrofoam cup commonly used to make it. They are usually eaten with a spoon, and flipped such that the soft sugary part is at the top. Huckabucks are typically sold for a dime or quarter, and generally alongside other snacks like chips and candy as a common after-school snack for schoolchildren. They are served at the New Orleans Jazz Festival and in many neighborhoods around central and southern Louisiana.

== See also ==
- Frozie cup
- Ice pop
- Italian ice
- Sno-ball
