= Calas (food) =

Creole rice fritters

Calas (/kəˈlɑː/) are dumplings composed primarily of cooked rice, yeast, sugar, eggs, and flour; the resulting batter is deep-fried. It is traditionally a breakfast dish, served with coffee or cafe au lait, and has a mention in most Creole cuisine cookbooks. Calas are also referred to as Creole rice fritters or rice doughnuts.

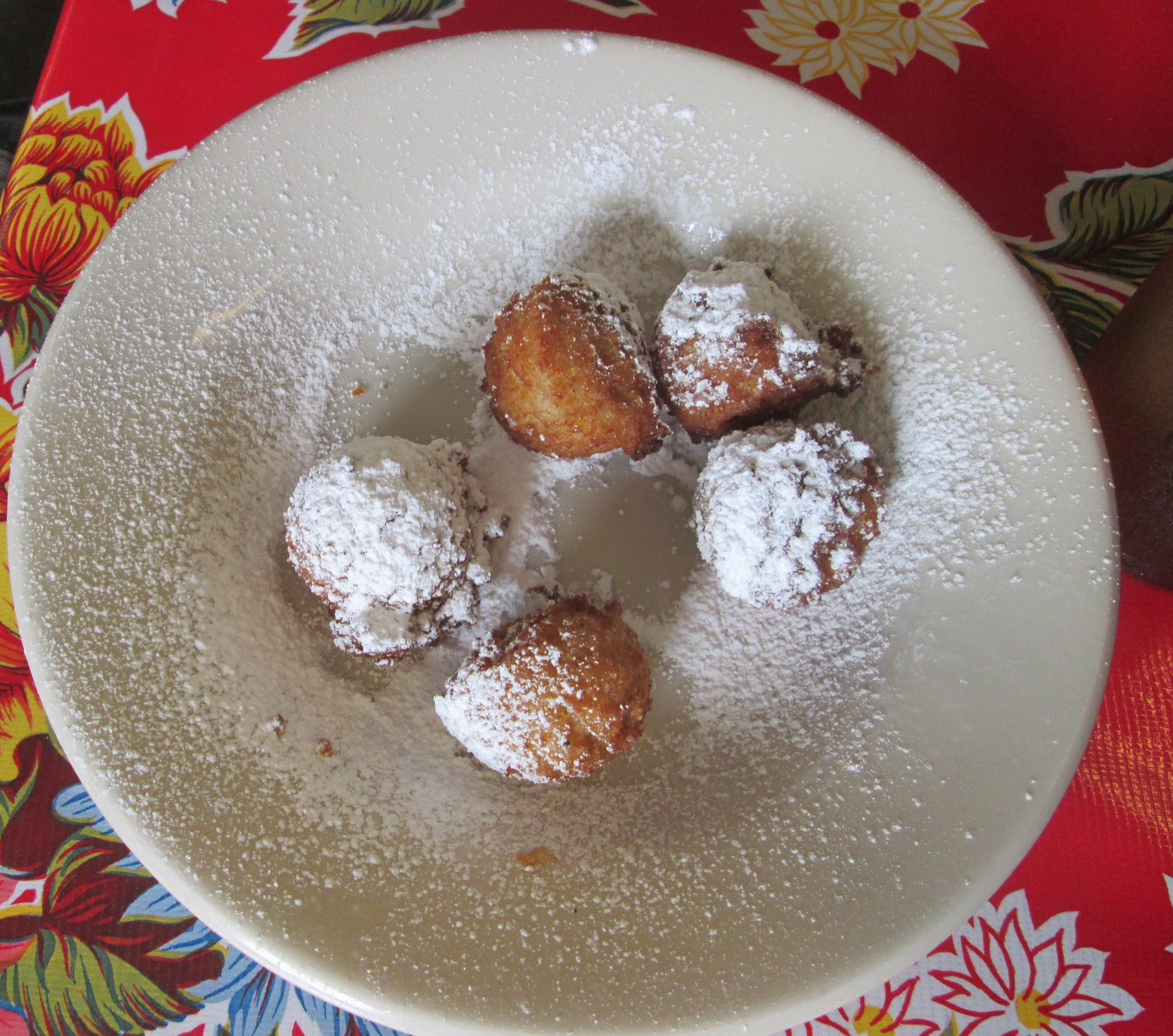
Plate of calas at a New Orleans restaurant

== History ==
The origin of calas is most often credited to enslaved people who came from rice-growing regions of Africa. A 1653 French recipe, beignets de riz, lends support to a French origin as well. The name "calas" is said to have come from the Nupe word kara ("fried cake").

Belles calas...Belles calas,
Tou cho, tou cho, tou cho!
Madame, mo gaignin calas,
Madame, mo gaignin calas,
Tou cho, tou cho, tou cho! (Note: "Fine rice fritters...fine rice fritters; All hot, all hot, quite hot! Madame, I have rice fritters; Madame, I have rice fritters; Quite hot, quite hot, quite hot!" This is part of a street cry several stanzas long. The street cries of calas vendors were varied and inventive.)

— "Street Criers", Gumbo Ya-Ya

Creole street vendors, typically women, (Note: Men sold calas on occasion, one source naming Richard Gabriel, "one of the last" calas street vendors.) sold the fresh hot calas in New Orleans' French Quarter, with the cry, "Bel calas tout chauds!" (Creole for "Beautiful calas, still hot"). These vendors, called "calas women", would sell their pastries in the early morning from covered baskets or bowls carried upon their heads.

Writers in the first decade of the 20th century refer to the increasing rarity of calas as street food. Though not widely sold, calas continued to be made at home using leftover rice, and was a typical breakfast food in early 20th-century New Orleans.

After World War II, while the beignet remained popular, the calas became more and more obscure. From a breakfast food it evolved into a Mardi Gras and First Communion treat among Louisiana Creole families. It could be specially requested at some restaurants. Through the efforts of food preservationists, interest in calas was revived and it began to appear on the menus of some restaurants.

== Preparation ==
In early recipes for calas, rice was boiled and cooled, then yeast added to make a sponge that was allowed to proof overnight. From this a batter was made by adding eggs, sugar and a little flour for binding. Rice flour was preferable but difficult to obtain, according to Eustis. A dash of salt might be included, and a grating of nutmeg was a typical addition. The batter was dropped by spoonfuls into deep, boiling lard and fried until browned. Modern recipes reflect the changes in available ingredients, cooking practices, and taste. Baking powder is sometimes used in place of yeast; vegetable oil is substituted for lard; savory variations have been developed.

== See also ==
- Arancini
- Akara

== Footnotes ==
Notes
