= Hand Grenade (cocktail) =

Alcoholic drink sold in New Orleans

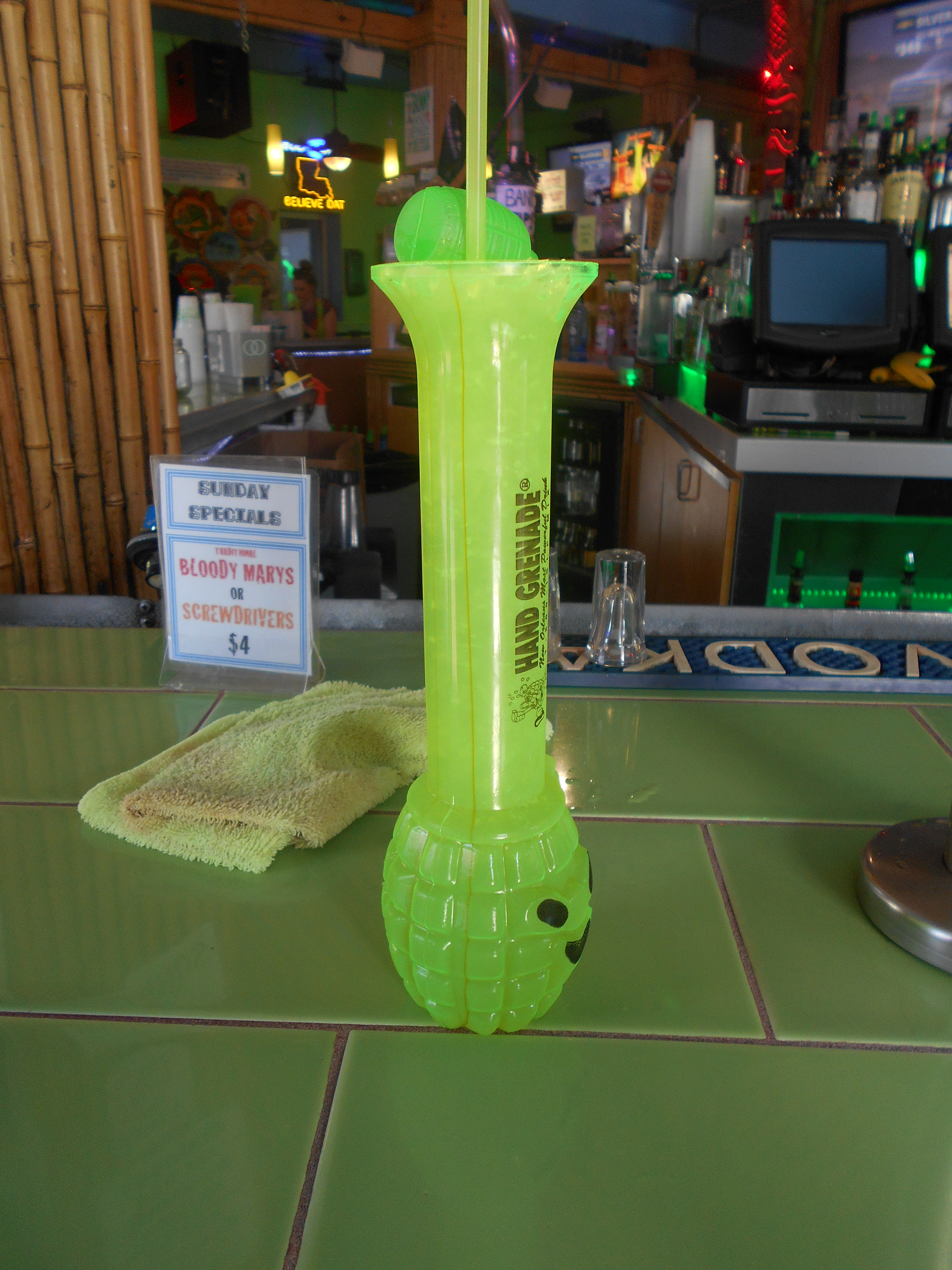
- Type: Cocktail
- Ingredients: 3 cl (1 part) Vodka; 3 cl (1 part) Rum; 3 cl (1 part) Gin; 3 cl (1 part) rectified spirit; 3 cl (1 part) melon liqueur
- Base spirit: Gin, Vodka, Rum, Fruit liqueur

The Hand Grenade is a cocktail drink made with vodka, rum, gin, and melon liqueur, sold frozen or on the rocks exclusively through five licensed nightclub bars in the New Orleans, French Quarter.

== History ==
Pam Fortner and Earl Bernhardt, owners of the Tropical Isle bar founded during the 1984 Louisiana World Exposition, created the melon-flavored Hand Grenade as their signature cocktail. Since January 1992, the Hand Grenade has been served in a green, translucent, plastic yard glass container with a bulbous, textured base shaped like an oversized hand grenade.

Five French Quarter bars sell the Hand Grenade.

== Popularity ==
Cocktail enthusiasts' opinions about the sweet and potent drink range from classifying it as a "terrible drink" to describing it as "well worth the hangover".

Tropical Isle's website sells a prepared Hand Grenade mix for home use.
