= Sno-ball =

Shaved-ice dessert

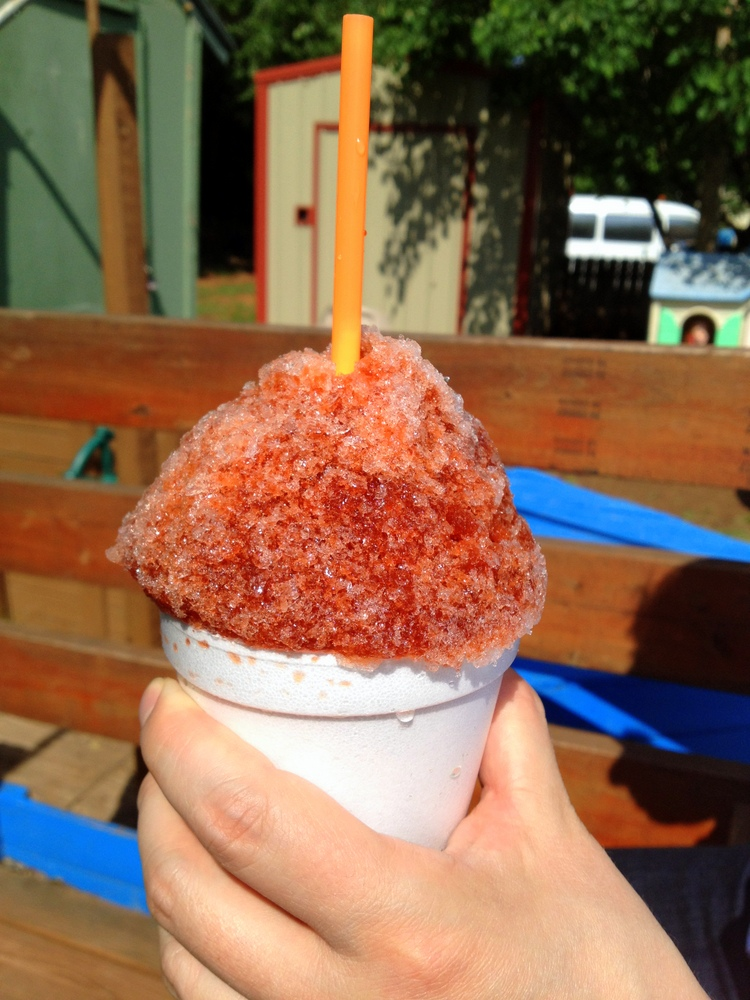
- A cherry lime sno-ball
- Type: Frozen dessert
- Region or state: Baltimore, Maryland and New Orleans, Louisiana
- Main ingredients: Water, cane syrup, flavoring

A sno-ball is a confection made with finely shaved ice and flavored sugar syrup. Commonly confused with the snow cone, the ice of a sno-ball is fine and fluffy; while a snow cone's ice is coarse, crunchy, and granular. Moreover, whereas in a snow cone the flavored syrup sinks to the bottom of the cup, in a sno-ball the ice absorbs the syrup.

Sno-balls are a seasonal treat as they are generally sold only from roughly March to October. They are vended from "sno-ball stands" throughout Maryland and the Deep South.

== History ==
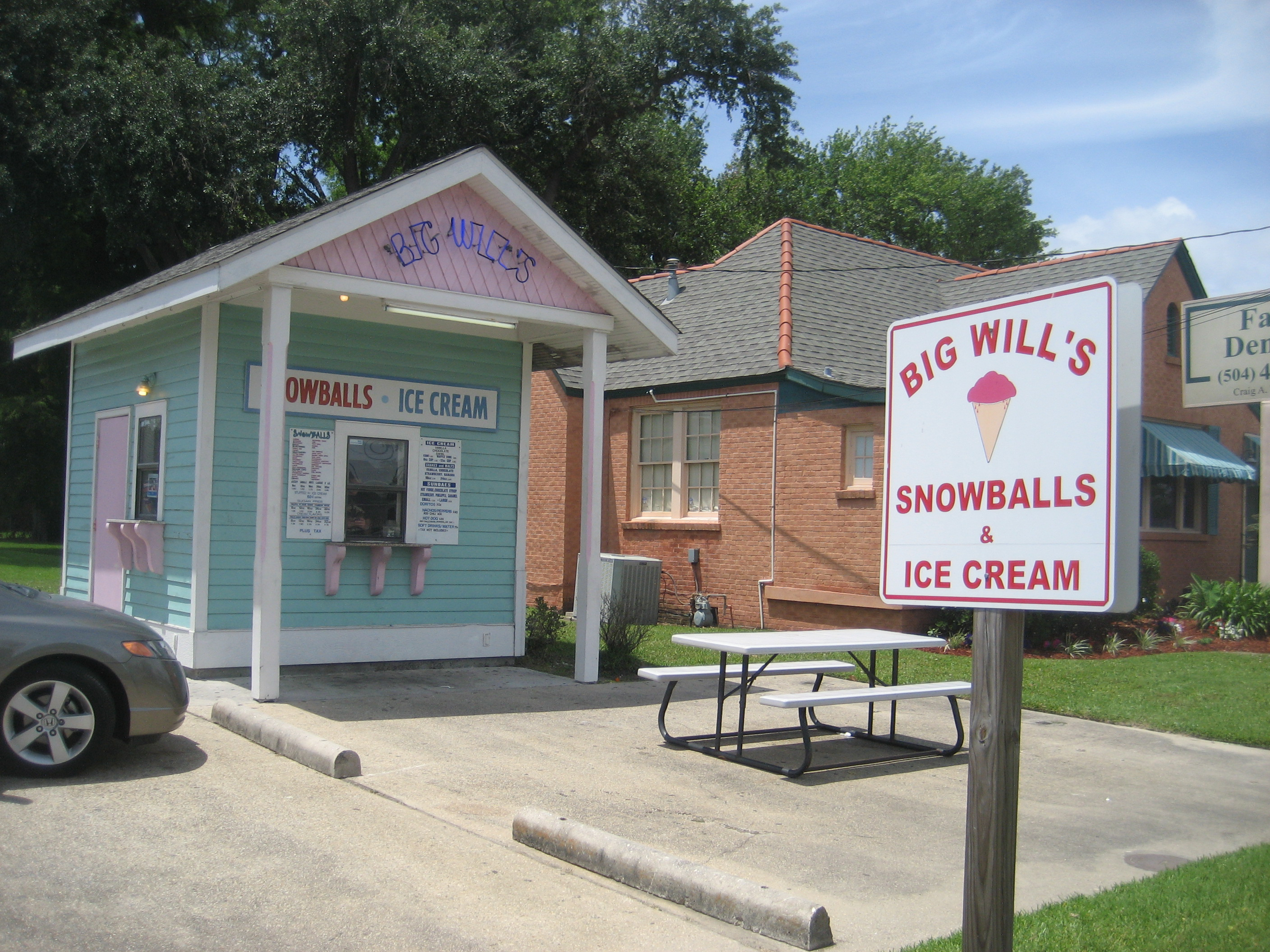
Snowball kiosk in Kenner, Louisiana

The sno-ball or “snowball's” history is contentious, with both New Orleans and Baltimore laying claim to the dessert.

Baltimore's snowball roots can be traced back to the Industrial Revolution. In the mid-1800s, ice houses shipped wagons with huge blocks of ice from New York to the South and, when they passed through Baltimore, children would beg for some ice shavings on humid summer days. Soon, moms in town began to make flavorings to sweeten the ice. The most common was a simple golden-hued egg custard—made with eggs, vanilla, and sugar—and that's still the most popular flavor to this day, now mimicked with a vanilla-laced syrup. Melted marshmallow, which is sticky but pourable, became a common topping, adding a dollop of sweetness and a creamy texture to the snowball.

The New Orleans sno-ball history begins in the 1930s. In a pre-electric era, ice was manually scraped from a block of ice, producing a coarser, crunchier version of the sno-ball. In 1934, Ernest Hansen invented the first motor-driven ice-shaving machine. For two years, Hansen kept the machine within his family, making sno-balls for only his children and relatives. In 1936, Ernest and his wife Mary took their machine to the streets of New Orleans and opened Hansen's Sno-Bliz. The business ran discontinuously for the following two years because Mary needed to care for her children. In 1939, they opened the shop and remained in business for the next 67 years.

By this time, grocer George Ortolano had invented his own ice-shaving machine, which he later called the Sno-Wizard. Ortolano redeveloped his wooden machine into one made of galvanized metal after he began receiving requests from people who wanted to use his machine to start their own businesses. Soon thereafter, he drew up blueprints for his machine and set his product into automated production. Ortolano's Sno-Wizards are now the primary sno-ball machines used in Louisiana and throughout the Gulf Coast.

The Great Depression only heightened the snowball's popularity because the treat was cheap to make and cheap to buy (today, most still cost under $3). In 1932, the stands were so numerous that people complained there were too many in their neighborhoods. Baltimore's mayor at the time, Harold W. Jackson, defended the purveyors, saying, "Some of us may be down to eating snowballs soon, and I don't want to put any limitations on the trade."

== Flavors ==
The following list contains many of the sno-ball flavors available at sno-ball stands around New Orleans and Baltimore.

- Almond
- Banana
- Bahama Mama
- Blackberry
- Blue Bubble Gum
- Blueberry
- Blue Raspberry
- Buttered popcorn
- Cake batter
- Cherry
- Chocolate
- Coconut
- Coffee
- Cotton Candy
- Cream soda
- Dreamsicle
- Daiquiri
- Egg custard
- French vanilla
- Grape
- Green apple
- Hawaiian Punch
- Ice cream
- Joker
- Key lime pie
- King cake
- Kiwi
- Lemon
- Lemon-ice
- Lemon-lime
- Lime
- Margarita
- Nectar
- Orange
- Orchid vanilla
- Peach
- Peanut butter
- Piña colada
- Pineapple
- Pink lemonade
- Raspberry
- Rocket 88
- Root beer
- Silver fox
- Skylite
- Spearmint
- Strawberry
- Tamarind
- Tangerine
- Tiger's blood
- Tutti frutti
- Vanilla malt
- Watermelon
- Wedding cake

== Variations ==
- Cheesecake Stuffed Snowball: created by Sno-La Snowballs, the snowball is stuffed with cheesecake in the center, surrounded by the snowball flavor of choice.
- Stuffed sno-ball: a sno-ball stuffed with vanilla or chocolate soft-serve ice cream. The first stuffed snocones were sold in 2005 in central Louisiana. CandyLand snocones on 28 east in Pineville, La were the first to substitute Blue Bell Homemade ice cream as an extra when one day the owners ran out of sweetened condensed cream. The idea caught on and within a year it was statewide.
- Cream-flavored sno-ball: a sno-ball made with flavored syrup mixed with evaporated milk
- Sugar-free sno-ball: a sno-ball made with sugar-free syrup
- Toppings: soft-serve ice cream, condensed milk, marshmallow fluff, Oreos
