= Leidenheimer Baking Company =

Bakery in New Orleans

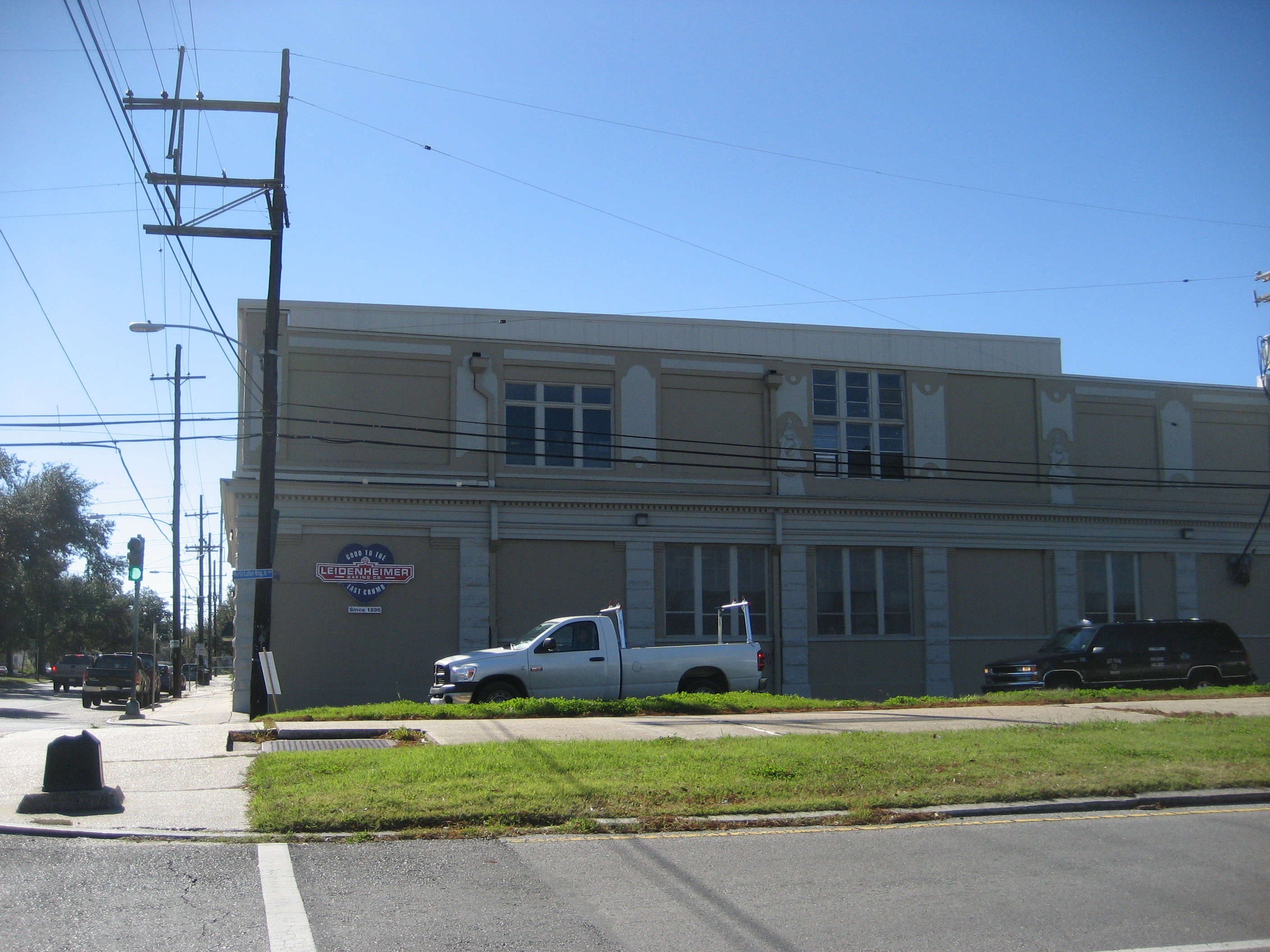
- Leidenheimer building in New Orleans' Central City neighborhood
- Type: Bakery
- Founded: 1896
- Founder: George Leidenheimer
- Headquarters: New Orleans, Louisiana, United States

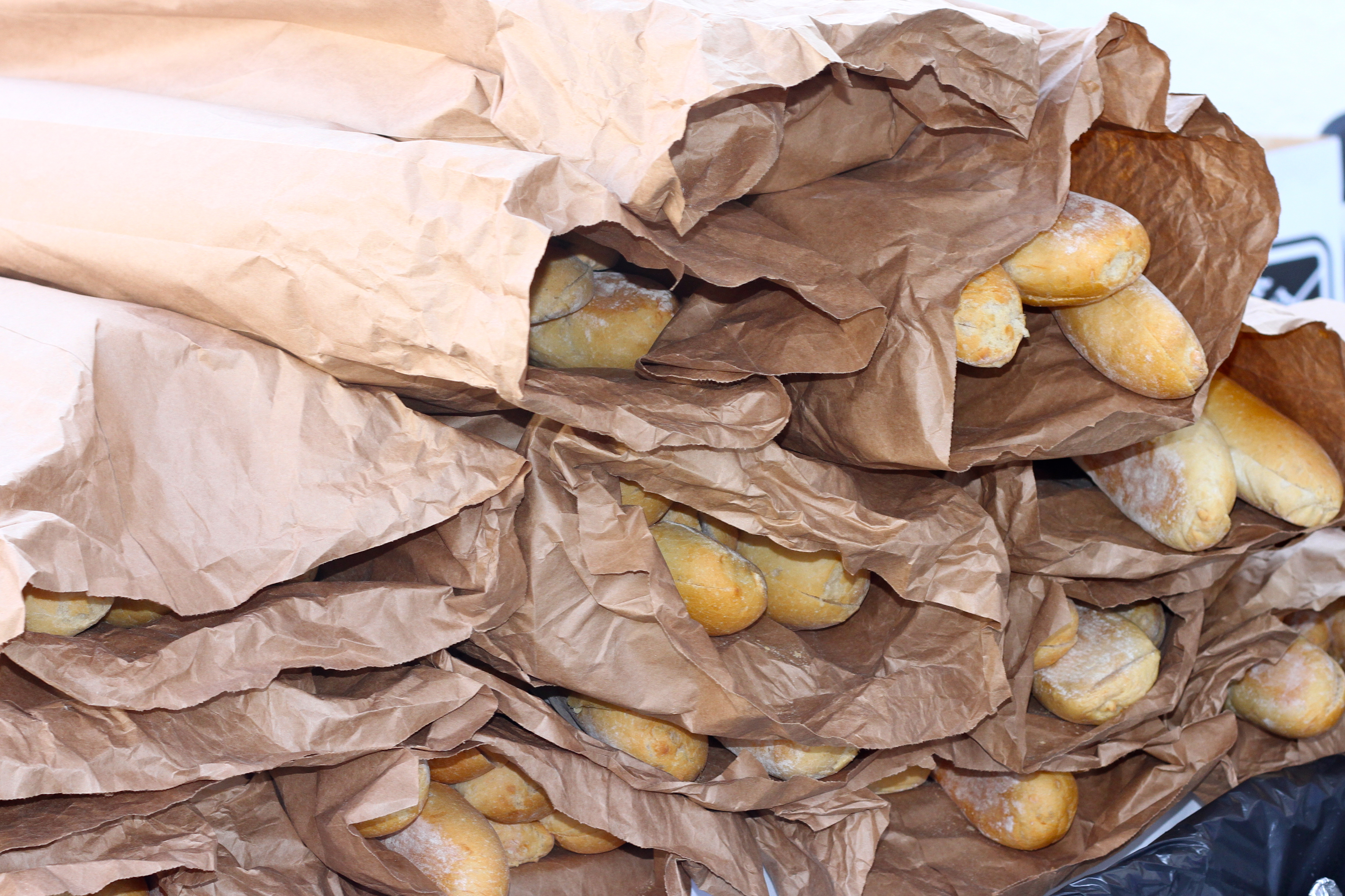
Loaves of Leidenheimer's bread at the Oak Street Po'Boy Festival 2011

Leidenheimer Baking Company is a historic bakery in New Orleans. It was started in 1896 by George Leidenheimer, an immigrant from Deidesheim, Germany. Initially located on Dryades Street, it moved in 1904 to Simon Bolivar Avenue, where it continues in business as the city's largest and best-known maker of po'boy bread, a fiercely competitive niche. Leidenheimer bought out its largest competitor, Reising's Sunrise, in the early 1990s, and still manufactures products under the Reising name. It bought another competitor, Angelo Gendusa, in the 2000s.

The bakery was forced to close for a short time after Hurricane Katrina in 2005. In the interim, Leidenheimer produced its bread in a Chicago bakery. In recent years, Leidenheimer has made the round, seeded bread for the muffuletta sandwich at New Orleans' Central Grocery (the former baker, United Bakery, did not reopen after Katrina).

Leidenheimer Baking Company is one of the historic businesses in the Central City section of New Orleans. To mark the company's centennial in 1996, the artwork of Bunny Matthews, creator of the "Nint' Ward"-based cartoon characters "Vic and Nat'ly", was added to the bakery's delivery trucks.
