= Italians in New Orleans =

Ethnic group

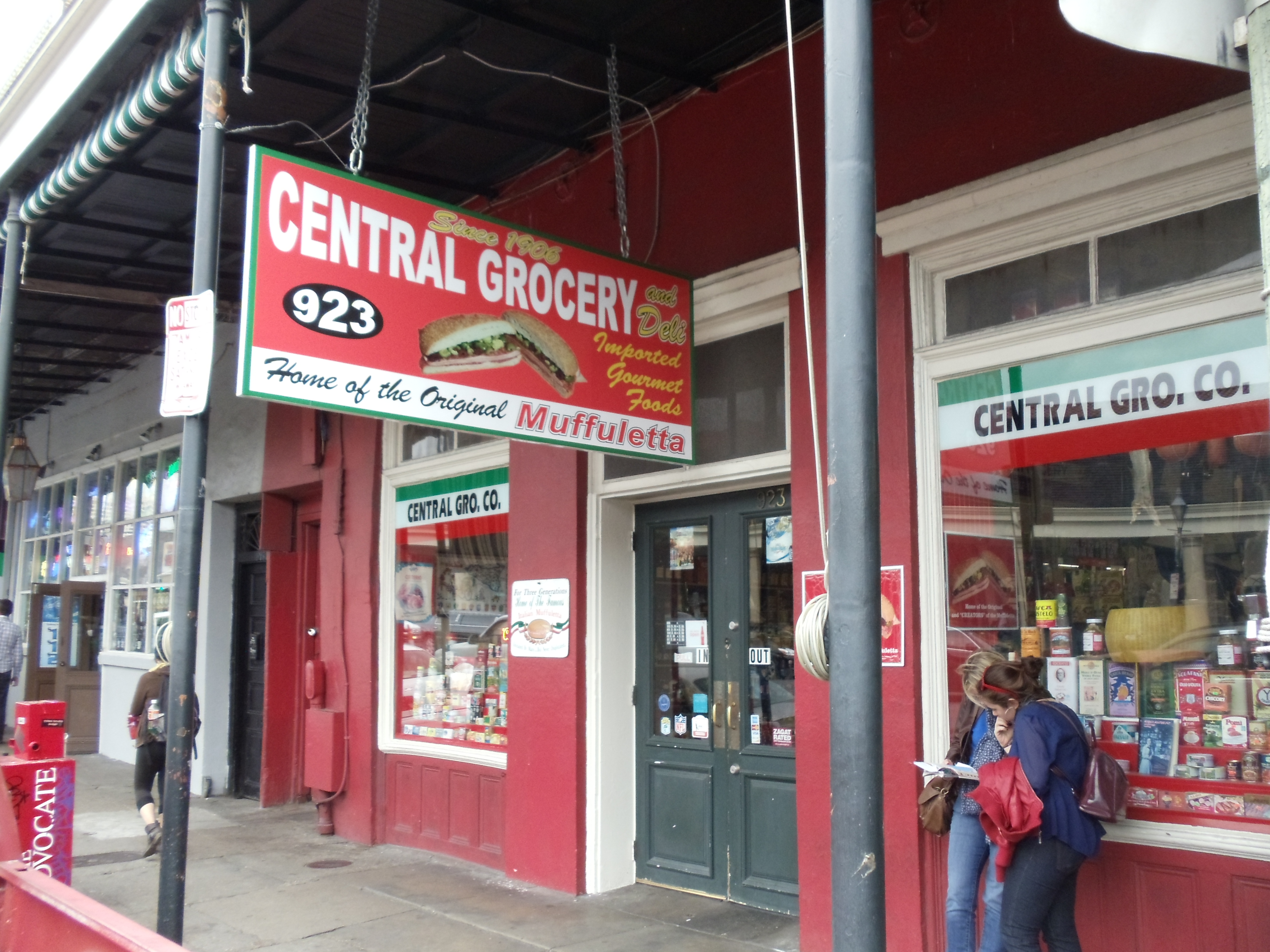
Central Grocery, an Italian-American grocery store in New Orleans where the muffuletta started in America. In 1906, Salvadore Lupo, owner of the Central Grocery, invented the muffuletta sandwich to feed fellow Sicilian immigrates. New Orleans has a historical Italian-American population. As of 2023 those identifying as of Italian descent were the largest ethnic group of Europeans in the New Orleans Metropolitan Area, numbering around 300,000.

Italians have had a presence in the New Orleans area since the explorations of the Europeans. Many Sicilians immigrated to New Orleans in the 19th century, traveling on the Palermo-New Orleans route by ship. The number of Italians who immigrated in the late 19th century greatly exceeded those who had come before the American Civil War. Only New York City has a higher population of Sicilian-Americans and Sicilian immigrants than New Orleans.

== History ==
Economics in Louisiana and Sicily combined to bring about what became known as the great migration of thousands of Sicilians. The end of the Civil War allowed the freed men the choice to stay or to go, many chose to leave for higher paying jobs, which in turn led to a perceived scarcity of labor resources for the planters. Northern Italy enjoyed the fruits of modern industrialization, while southern Italy and Sicily suffered destitute conditions under the system of absentee landowners. The peasant was still essentially the serf in the system. Emigration not only offered peasants a chance to move beyond subsistence living, it also offered them a chance to pursue their own dreams of proprietorship as farmers or other business owners. On March 17, 1866, the Louisiana Bureau of Immigration was formed and planters began to look to Sicily as a possible solution to their labor needs. Steamship companies advertisements were very effective in recruiting potential workers. Three steamships per month were running between New Orleans and Sicily by September 1881 at a cost of only forty dollars per person.

In 1890 the ethnic Irish chief of police, David Hennessy was assassinated. Suspicion fell on Italians, whose growing numbers in the city made other native whites nervous and led to vicious anti-Italian prejudice. The March 14, 1891 New Orleans lynchings were the largest ever mass lynchings in Louisiana history. The use of the term "mafia" by local media in relation to the murder is the first-known usage of the word in print.

== Geography ==
"Little Palermo" was established by recent immigrants in the lower French Quarter. So many Italians settled here that some suggested the area should be renamed as "The Sicilian Quarter" in the early 20th century. As time passed and they became established, many Italian-Americans moved out of New Orleans and to the suburbs.

== Economy ==
Historically many corner stores in New Orleans were owned by Italians. Progresso Foods originated as a New Orleans Italian-American business. The business established by the Vaccaro brothers later became Standard Fruit.

After they first arrived, Italian immigrants generally took low-wage laboring jobs, which they could accomplish without being able to speak English. They worked on docks, in macaroni factories, and in nearby sugar plantations. Some went to the French Market to sell fruit. Italian workers became a significant presence in the French Market.

== Organizations ==
In 1843 the Società Italiana di Mutua Beneficenza was established. The San Bartolomeo Society, established by immigrants from Ustica, was established in 1879. As of 2004 it is the oldest Italian-American society in New Orleans. Joseph Maselli, an ethnic Italian from New Orleans, founded the first pan-U.S. Italian-American federation of organizations.

The American Italian Cultural Center honors and celebrates the area's Italian-American heritage and culture. The AICC houses the American Italian Museum, with exhibits about the history and contributions of Italian-Americans to the region. The Piazza d'Italia is a local monument dedicated to the Italian-American community of New Orleans.

== Recreation ==
On Saint Joseph's Day, ethnic Sicilians in the New Orleans area establish altars. On that day marches organized by the Italian-American Marching Club occur. The club, which welcomes anyone of Italian origins, started in 1971 and as of 2004 has more than 1,500 members.

Italian Americans originally established the Krewe of Virgilians because they were unable to join other Krewes in the Mardi Gras. In 1936 the krewes crowned their first queen, Marguerite Piazza, who worked in the New Orleans Metropolitan Opera.

== Cuisine ==
Italians in New Orleans brought with them many dishes from Sicilian cuisine and broader Italian cuisines, which influenced the Cuisine of New Orleans. Many food businesses and restaurants were started by Italians in New Orleans. Progresso, now a large Italian food brand, was started by Sicilian immigrants to New Orleans. Angelo Brocato's an Italian Ice cream parlor and bakery, established in 1905 by a Sicilian immigrant, is still in existence today. Central Grocery, also founded by a Sicilian immigrant and still in business, originated the muffaletta sandwich, served on the traditional Sicilian muffaletta bread.

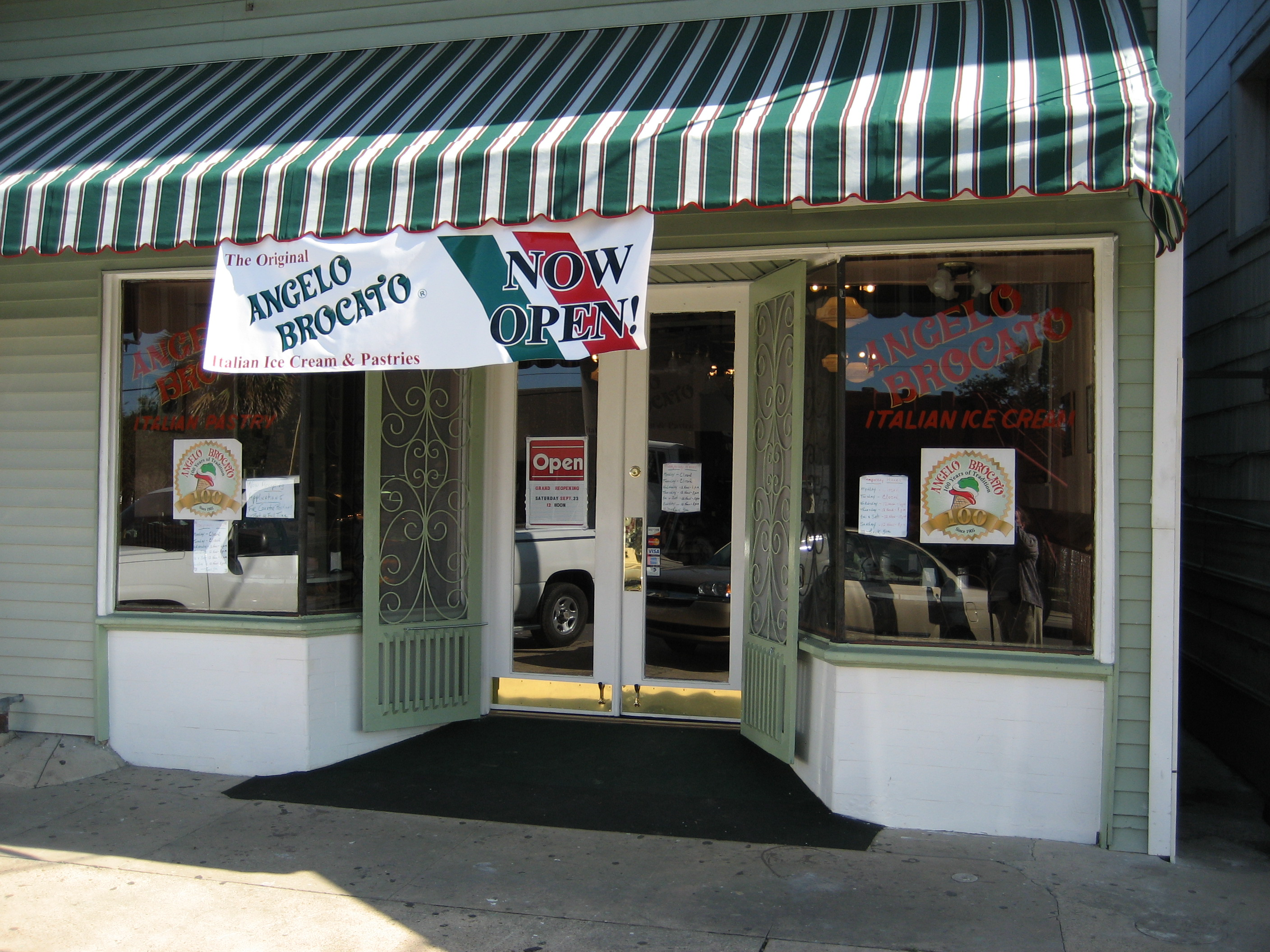
Angelo Brocato's

== Notable people ==
- Sam Butera
- Dukes of Dixieland (Frank Assunto, Freddie Assunto, Papa Assunto)
- Nick LaRocca
- Carlos Marcello
- Louis Prima
- Vaccaro brothers (including Joseph Vaccaro), who established Standard Fruit
- Robert Maestri
- Cosimo Matassa
- Victor H. Schiro
- Candy Candido
- Steve Scalise
