= Joseph Maselli =

- Born: May 30, 1924
- Died: October 18, 2009 (aged 85)
- Education: Tulane University; Rutgers University
- Occupation: Businessman

Joseph Maselli (May 30, 1924 - October 18, 2009) was a businessman, philanthropist, and American-Italian activist. Maselli was the founder and publisher of the Italian American Digest. Maselli also founded the American Italian Museum and the Louisiana American Italian Sports Hall of Fame (now known as the American Italian Cultural Center) as well as the American Italian Federation of the Southeast, the first umbrella organization of Italian American groups in the region and now consisting of 30 organizations.

== Early life, education and military service ==
Maselli was born in Newark, New Jersey to Francesco and Maria (née Ianetta) Maselli. His father immigrated to the United States from Deliceto, in the region of Apulia, Italy, and his mother from San Giorgio a Liri in the region of Lazio, Italy. He was the couple’s first child and elder brother to Carmine and Domenick. He spent his childhood in Belleville, New Jersey. As a youth, he participated in a number of sports, including baseball, billiards, boxing, and ping pong. He was an avid philatelist and fan of the Lone Ranger. He graduated from Belleville High School in 1942.

After briefly studying at Rutgers University, Maselli enlisted in the United States Army at the start of World War II. He was stationed at Fort Leonard Wood in Missouri and was later transferred to Camp Harahan outside of New Orleans. His duties mainly consisted of administrative work in the transportation corps, and he rose to the rank of sergeant. For his service, he was awarded the Good Conduct Medal.

Maselli attained a degree in Commercial Science at Tulane University in 1950, completing his course of study in three years. Throughout his studies, he continued to work full time and support his growing family.

== Business ==
Maselli opened his first business, a liquor wholesaler, after graduating from Tulane. His business grew and expanded into City Wholesale Liquor Co. and has been in continuous operation since 1950. His other primary business interest included commercial real estate.

== American Italian activism ==
By age 50, Maselli turned his attention towards civic and philanthropic endeavors. In the early 1970s, Maselli partnered with New Orleans Mayor Maurice Edwin “Moon” Landrieu in creating the Piazza d’Italia, a “people place” that has garnered many architectural awards and hosted numerous events.

In 1973 Maselli founded the Italian American Digest.

He oversaw the creation of the Italian Village exhibit at the 1984 World’s Fair. He founded the American-Italian Renaissance Foundation in 1985. He made a point of using the term “American-Italian” instead of the more common “Italian-American” to emphasize that, first and foremost, he and his fellow New Orleanians of Italian origin were Americans. Maselli served as the foundation’s first director.

He founded the Louisiana American Italian Sports Hall of Fame in 1985.

Throughout his life, Maselli sponsored and supported many amateur athletic teams, from little league to the US Olympic Boxing Team.

He created the Italian-American Federation of the Southeast in the early 1970s, combining more than 30 civic groups under one umbrella organization.

In 1992, Maselli chaired the Louisiana Quincentenary Commission arranging for replicas of Christopher Columbus’ three ships, the Nina, the Pinta, and the Santa Maria, to stop for exhibition at the Mississippi riverfront, enabling over 100,000 people to visit the ships.

Maselli provided narration for the WYES documentary “Italian New Orleans” and appeared in numerous television shows in the United States and in Italy speaking about Italian American culture. He also provided narration for the A&E documentary on the Italian immigrant experience in New Orleans.

== Civic activities ==
Maselli served as a board member of the New Orleans Aviation Board, French Market Board, State Ethics Commission, and Metropolitan Crime Commission.

Maselli also served as an ethnic affairs advisor to U.S. Presidents Gerald Ford, Jimmy Carter, Ronald Reagan, and George H.W. Bush.

== Author ==
Along with co-author Dominic Candeloro, Maselli published "Italians in New Orleans" in 1995.

== Honors and awards ==
In 1978 Maselli was made a Knight Grand Officer in the Order of Merit of the Italian Republic (Grande Ufficiale Ordine al Merito della Repubblica Italiana.)

In 1989 he was awarded the Weiss Award by the National Conference of Christians and Jews.

In 1990, Maselli was awarded the Ellis Island Medal of Honor in recognition of the significant impact Maselli made on his community through a lifetime of service.

In 2007 the Anti-Defamation League bestowed their Torch of Liberty Award upon Maselli.

== Personal ==
Maselli met Antoinette Cammarata at a local USO club show on his first night in New Orleans, LA upon being stationed at Camp Harahan in 1945. Antoinette was singing with the band. They were married in 1946 and had four children, Joseph Jr., Frank, Jan, and Michael, and nine grandchildren. Maselli’s son Frank has continued in his father’s activist footsteps as chairman of the AICC.

== Death ==
Maselli died of natural causes on October 18, 2009, in New Orleans.
