= Bunny Matthews =

American cartoonist and music journalist (1951–2021)

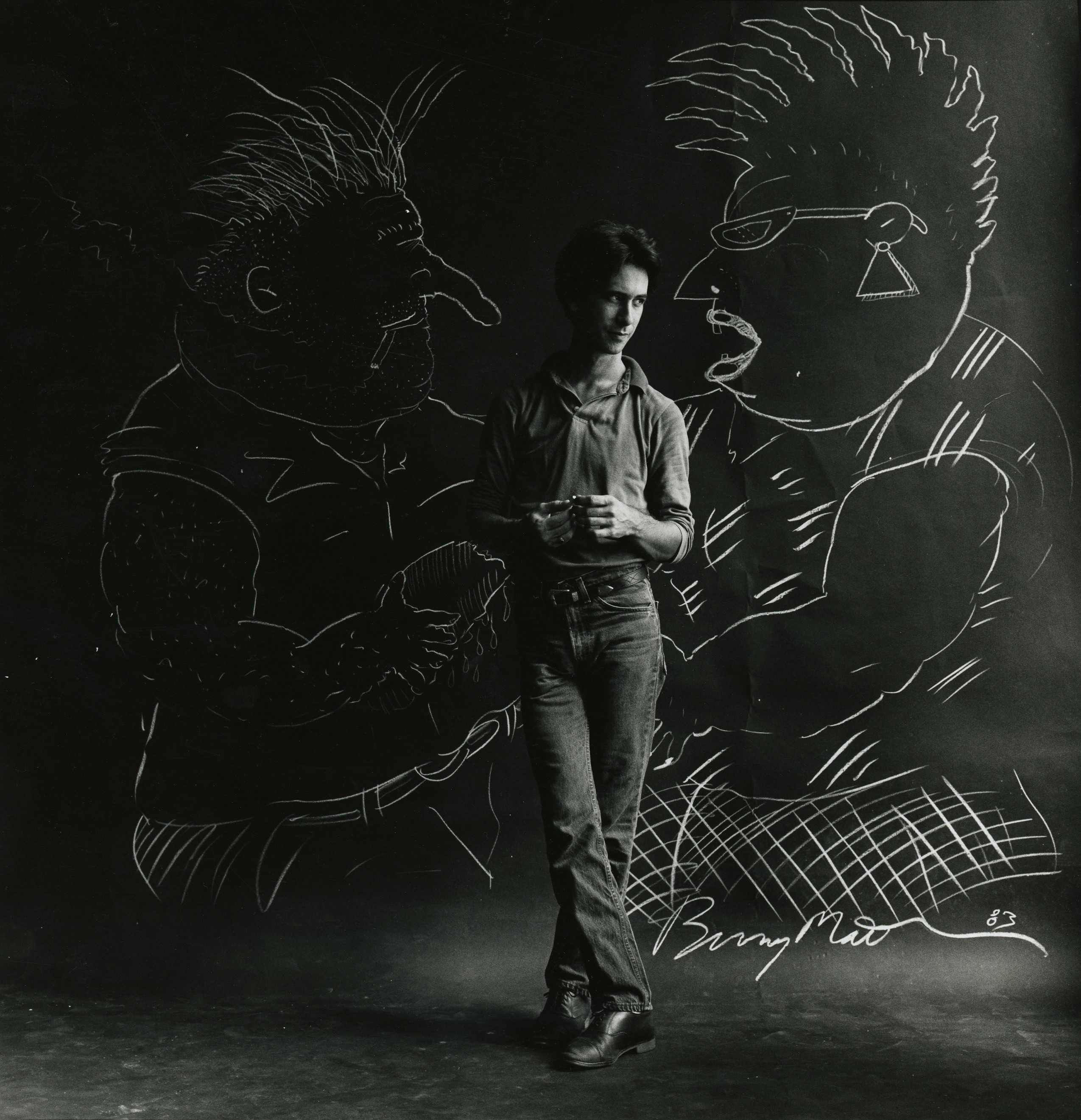
- Matthews in 1983
- Born: Will Bunn Matthews III; February 15, 1951; Monroe, Louisiana, U.S.
- Died: June 1, 2021 (aged 70); Marrero, Louisiana, U.S.
- Known for: Cartooning

Will Bunn "Bunny" Matthews III (February 15, 1951 – June 1, 2021) was an American cartoonist and writer from the Greater New Orleans Area. He is best known for his depictions of New Orleans characters and local dialect, especially Vic and Nat'ly Broussard.

== Early life ==
Matthews was born in Monroe, Louisiana, in 1951. His family moved to the New Orleans suburb of Metairie when he was three years old. He graduated from East Jefferson High School in Metairie, and afterwards worked at Jim Russell Records before enrolling at the University of New Orleans. Due to a high draft lottery number that decreased his chances of being sent to the Vietnam War, he dropped out of college and began working as a freelance writer.

== Career ==
Matthews's characters Vic and Nat'ly Broussard are an overweight husband and wife who speak in what some call the Yat dialect and run a working-class corner bar and po-boy emporium in the city's Ninth Ward. In light of these characters' sometimes unfavorable reception, it bears noting that Matthews has often and repeatedly described others' use of the word "Yat" as derogatory.

Matthews' cartooning style has been called "post-psychedelic baroque". Vic and Nat'ly first appeared in 1982 in Dixie, a former weekly supplement of The Times-Picayune. Matthews' first cartoon strip was titled F'Sure: Actual Dialogue Heard on the Streets of New Orleans, published from the late-1970s to the early-1980s in the defunct New Orleans weekly paper Figaro for which Matthews also wrote music reviews. A collection of some F'Sure strips was published in book form in 1978.

Some of Matthews' artwork can be viewed in the Louisiana State Museum in Baton Rouge, the Audubon Insectarium in New Orleans, and gracing the sides of New Orleans bakery Leidenheimer Baking Co.'s delivery trucks. His original illustrations can be found in the Historic New Orleans Collection, which also commissioned Matthews to create a large mural for the official City of New Orleans Pavilion at the 1984 World's Fair. His exhibitions include "Chihuahua: King of New Orleans Dogs" (Scheurich Gallery), "The Art of Bunny Matthews" (Contemporary Arts Center, New Orleans), "Bunny Matthews: Art For Heterosexuals" (Space Gallery), "Da Eve O'Destruction" (Vega Tapas Cafe), "Too Many Bunnies" (Arthur Roger 434), "Black and White" (Arthur Roger Gallery), "The People of New Orleans From A-Z" (Arthur Roger Gallery), "Before and After" (Arthur Roger Gallery), and "Bunny Matthews" (Arthur Roger Gallery). His monumental painting, "Nint'Wardica," based on Pablo Picasso's "Guernica" and inspired by the BP oil disaster in 2010, was displayed at the Ogden Museum of Southern Art.

During his career as a music journalist, Matthews interviewed countless celebrities including James Brown, Brenda Lee, Bob Marley, Peter Tosh, Bunny Wailer, Lee "Scratch" Perry, Professor Longhair, Fats Domino, Eddie Bo, Ernie K-Doe, King Floyd, Bobby Marchan, Jessie Hill, Albert Collins, Elvis Costello, Mark E. Smith, Marilyn Chambers, Cab Calloway, Black Flag, Jonathan Richman, Suzi Quatro, Al Green, and 1978 Playmate of the Year Debra Jo Fondren. He composed album liner notes for artists including Smiley Lewis, The Meters, Earl King and James Booker, with whom Matthews was close friends until his death in 1983. He was editor of the New Orleans entertainment magazine OffBeat from 1999 to 2005.

On February 15, 2012, Matthews' band, Bunny and the Playboys, performed for the first time at Tipitina's. The band includes guitarist/vocalist Christopher Stoudt, guitarist Anton Gussoni and bassist Colby Kiefer.

== Personal life ==
Starting in the late 1980s, Matthews resided in Abita Springs, Louisiana. In 2015, he underwent multiple surgeries for a malignant brain tumor, from which he had largely recovered as of April 2016.

Matthews married Deborah Murphy (born 1961) on October 11, 1986. They were married for 31 years before Deborah died on April 3, 2018, due to complications from cancer. The couple had two children.

Matthews died in hospice care at Wynhoven Health Care Center in Marrero on June 1, 2021, of lymphoma of the central nervous system, at the age of 70.

== Books ==
- F'Sure!: Actual Dialogue Heard on the Streets of New Orleans (1978)
- Vic and Nat'ly (1983)
- Vic and Nat'ly, volume II (1985)
- Vic and Nat'ly's 1985: A New Orleans Calendar (1984)
- Journey Towards Christmas: A Travelogue, 1914-1994 (1992)
