= Augusto Pérez =

Augusto Pérez may refer to:

- Augusto Pérez Araníbar (1858–1948), Peruvian physician and philanthropist
- Augusto Pérez Garmendia (1899–1936), Spanish soldier
- Augusto Pérez Palacios (1909–2002), Mexican architect and professor
- Augusto Matte Pérez (1843–1913), Chilean politician, lawyer and diplomat

== See also ==
- Augusto Perez (born 1972) retired Spanish American wheelchair curler
- August Perez III (1933–2014), U.S. architect
