= Lory Schaff =

American educator for adult literacy (1932–2012)

Sister Lory Schaff CSJ
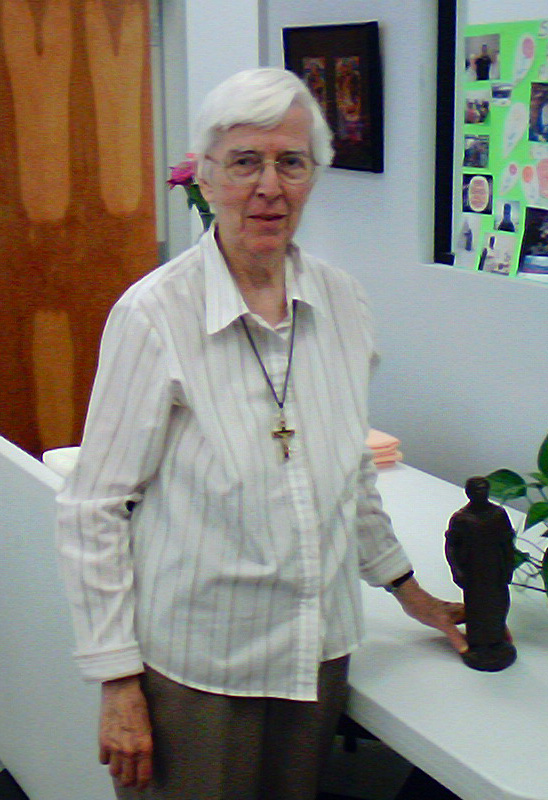
- Sr. Schaff in 2009
- Church: Catholic
- Archdiocese: New Orleans

Personal details
- Born: September 26, 1932; New Orleans, Louisiana, U.S.
- Died: January 21, 2012 (aged 79); New Orleans, Louisiana
- Buried: Roselawn Cemetery (Baton Rouge, Louisiana)
- Occupation: Educator specializing in adult literacy
- Education: Webster College (B.S.); University of Notre Dame (M.S.); Notre Dame Seminary (M.A.)
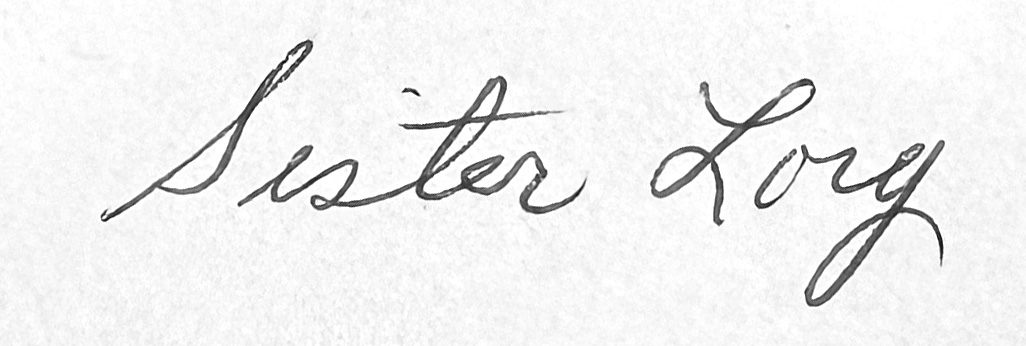
- Signature

Lory Schaff CSJ (1932 – 2012) was a nun in New Orleans, Louisiana, United States, who co-founded Hope House to serve underprivileged people in housing projects in New Orleans. She is also notable for her efforts on adult literacy education, particularly the St. Vincent de Paul Adult Learning Center in New Orleans. Schaff also established the St. Paul Adult Learning Center in Baton Rouge, Louisiana.

== Early life and education ==
Schaff was born in New Orleans on September 26, 1932, to parents Ferdinand Jacob Schaff and Sarah Lory Schaff, who were both from New Orleans. She attended Holy Name School in New Orleans before entering Webster College in Webster Groves, Missouri. Schaff subsequently earned a master's degree in biology at the University of Notre Dame and then a master's degree in religious education at the Notre Dame Seminary Graduate School of Theology in New Orleans.

== Career ==
=== Religious life ===
In 1953, Schaff entered the Sisters of Mercy order of nuns. During that time, she was known as Sister Joannes.

In 1984, Schaff transferred to the Sisters of St. Joseph and resumed use of her birth name, as Sister Lory Schaff. She remained a member of this order for the rest of her life.

In the early 21st century, as various Catholic parishes in the Archdiocese of New Orleans went through consolidation, Schaff facilitated the merger of three parishes, St. Mathias, St. Monica, and Our Lady of Lourdes. The effort resulted in the formation of the Blessed Trinity Catholic Church and its parish.

For the duration of her religious life, Schaff was known to friends, colleagues and students as Sister Lory.

=== Educator ===
Following completion of her own education, Schaff started her career as an educator. She taught at various high schools including Mercy Academy (New Orleans), St. Patrick School (Walnut, Kansas), Mercy College (defunct secondary school in St. Louis, Missouri), and Trinity High School (Hutchinson, Kansas). Schaff subsequently served as director of religious education at St. Alphonsus Parish in New Orleans. During her time with the Sisters of Mercy, she was in the St. Louis Archdiocese, before returning to Louisiana.

Schaff's focus shifted to the education of disadvantaged people, including education through adult literacy programs, an emphasis that she maintained for the duration of her career.

Schaff collaborated closely with another member of the Sisters of Mercy, Kathleen Bahlinger, on three institutions to improve the education and housing of disadvantaged people of Baton Rouge and New Orleans. The first of these was Hope House, founded in the 1960s with the aid of Sister Marilyn Foy of the Sisters of the Blessed Sacrament. The three nuns believed that opportunities for many of the disadvantaged people in the New Orleans area, particularly among African-Americans, were limited by lack of high school equivalency. The problem was accentuated by changes in the local public school system that were happening at the time. The three nuns addressed this need through the creation of Hope House and its high school equivalency educational efforts. The center was located in the St. Thomas Housing Project, where many disadvantaged people lived at the time. During her time at Hope House, Schaff and other nuns resided in an apartment within the housing project.

With Sister Kathleen Bahlinger, CSJ, Schaff founded the St. Paul Adult Learning Center in Baton Rouge, where she taught from 1983-2006. The St. Paul Adult Learning Center, located on the grounds of St. Paul the Apostle Church in Baton Rouge, provided a place where men and women could complete their basic education and work toward earning their Certificate of High School Equivalency (GED).

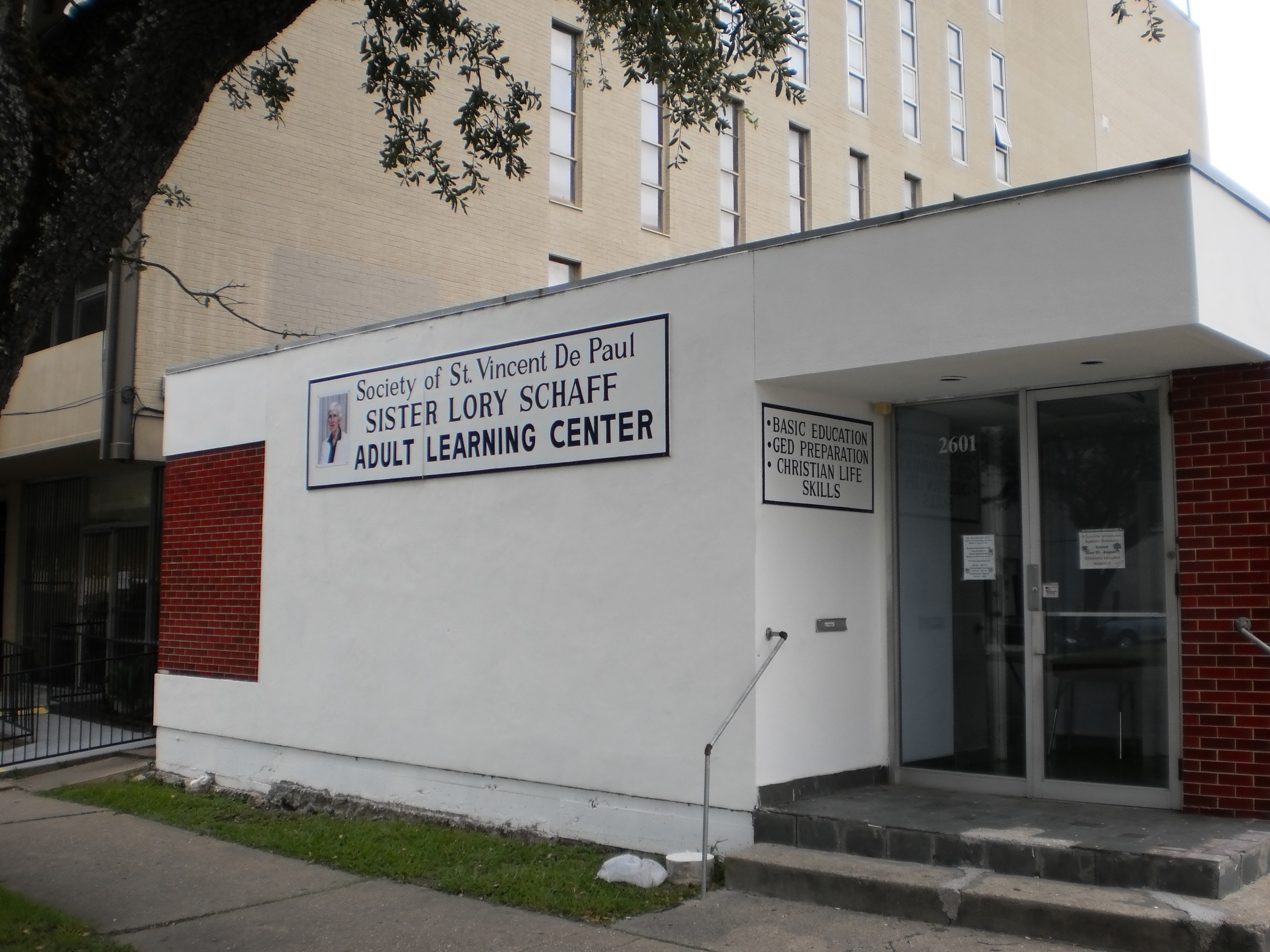
Entrance to the St. Vincent de Paul Adult Learning Center as it was in 2012

Schaff and co-founder Sister Kathleen Bahlinger opened the St. Vincent de Paul Adult Learning Center (SVDP-ALC) in New Orleans to teach adult literacy to underprivileged people in New Orleans. The effort was a result of the economic impact of Hurricane Katrina on underprivileged adults in New Orleans. Many of these were people struggling to find gainful employment. Deacon Rudy Rayfield, then director of the New Orleans conference of the Society of St. Vincent de Paul, conceived of the idea of using education to address problems of economically disadvantaged people. Rayfield recruited Schaff to lead the effort, resulting in the creation of the SVDP-ALC.

Schaff was a board member for the East Baton Rouge Housing Authority, working toward finding suitable housing for the homeless.

In 2010, Schaff self-published a book "A Tale Seldom Told" that re-counts her experiences working on behalf of residents at the St. Thomas Housing Project in New Orleans. Schaff used proceeds from book sales to help provide financial support for the St. Paul the Apostle Learning Center in Baton Rouge. By 2011, book sales generated $9000 to benefit the center.

In an interview about her book, Schaff stated:

“My experience has been that people turn a corner once they begin to succeed. If they haven’t been able to do something for 10 years and then, in a single month, they can do it, they begin to smile broadly and say, ‘I got that! I can do that!’”

Schaff was committed to resolution of social justice issues throughout her life as a nun and educator. She participated in civil rights marches and was supportive of social justice efforts by then-United States President Barack Obama, attending his events when he visited New Orleans in 2009.

== Death ==
Having worked in adult literacy education until nearly the end of her life, Schaff died on January 21, 2012, of non-Hodgkin lymphoma. She was buried at Roselawn Cemetery in Baton Rouge.

Shortly after her death, the SVDP-ALC was renamed the St. Vincent de Paul Sister Lory Schaff Adult Learning Center.
