= Notre Dame Seminary =

Catholic seminary in New Orleans

Notre Dame Seminary Graduate School of Theology
- Motto: Deus Providebit (Latin)
- Motto in English: God Will Provide
- Type: Private seminary
- Established: 1923
- Accreditation: Association of Theological Schools (ATS); Southern Association of Colleges and Schools (SACSCOC)
- Religious affiliation: Catholic Church
- Chancellor: Gregory M. Aymond
- Rector: Joshua J. Rodrigue
- Location: New Orleans, Louisiana, United States; 29°57′32″N 90°06′56″W
- Campus: Urban ~9 acres (3.6 ha)
- Website: nds.edu

Notre Dame Seminary is a Catholic seminary in New Orleans, Louisiana. It operates under the auspices of the Archdiocese of New Orleans.

It serves the other six Catholic dioceses of the Ecclesiastical Province of New Orleans, six additional dioceses in the Southern United States and Africa, and four Catholic religious institutes. It offers the graduate degrees of M.Div. and M.A. in theological studies.

In 2016, the reported enrollment was around 130 seminarians.

== History ==
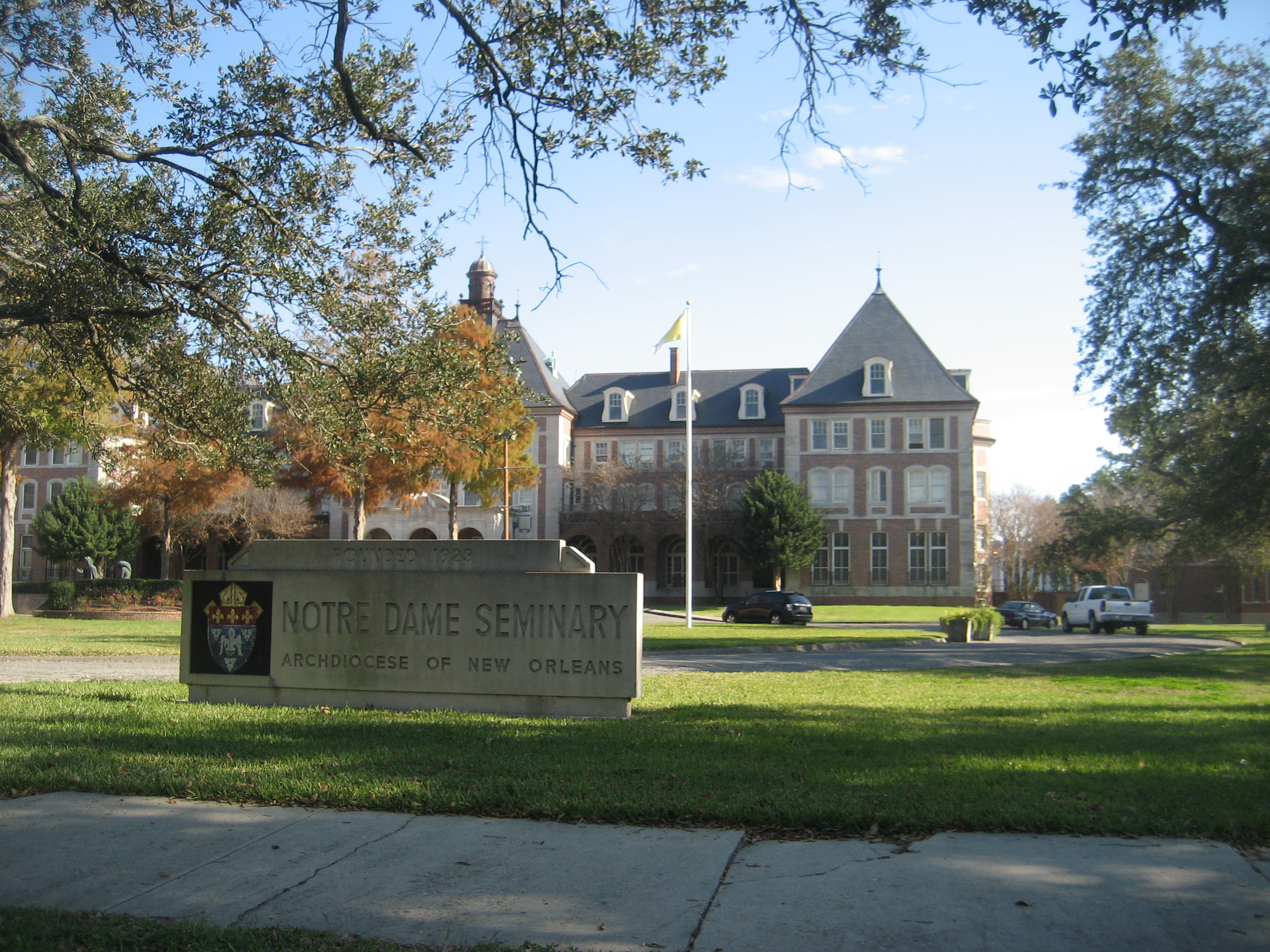
Notre Dame Seminary seen from Carrollton Avenue.

The seminary was founded in 1923 and the building was designed by architect General Allison Owen.

The seminary hosts a bronze copy of Ivan Meštrović's sculpture Christ and the Samaritan Woman which was exhibited at the Vatican pavilion at the 1984 Louisiana World Exposition. It was installed in front of Shaw Hall and dedicated in 1989 by Archbishop Philip Hannan.

In February 2013, it played host to an exhibit featuring pieces from other institutions (such as the Vatican Collections and the Pope John Paul II Center in Kraków, Poland), about Pope John Paul II, called, "I Have Come To See You Again."; it began its U.S. tour at NDS.

In Spring 2021, the seminary hosted a replica of the Angels Unawares statue, which was initially exhibited at the Catholic University of America and was to return there permanently after its tour.

In November 2025, the Archdiocese of New Orleans placed over 150 parishes and charities in Chapter 11 bankruptcy protection as part of a settlement plan to resolve hundreds of sex abuse lawsuits. This wave of bankruptcies included the Notre Dame Seminary.

== Notable alumni ==
- Servant of God Joseph Verbis Lafleur
- Lory Schaff, a leader in adult literacy education
