= One Canal Place =

Coordinates: 29.9514°N 90.0655°W

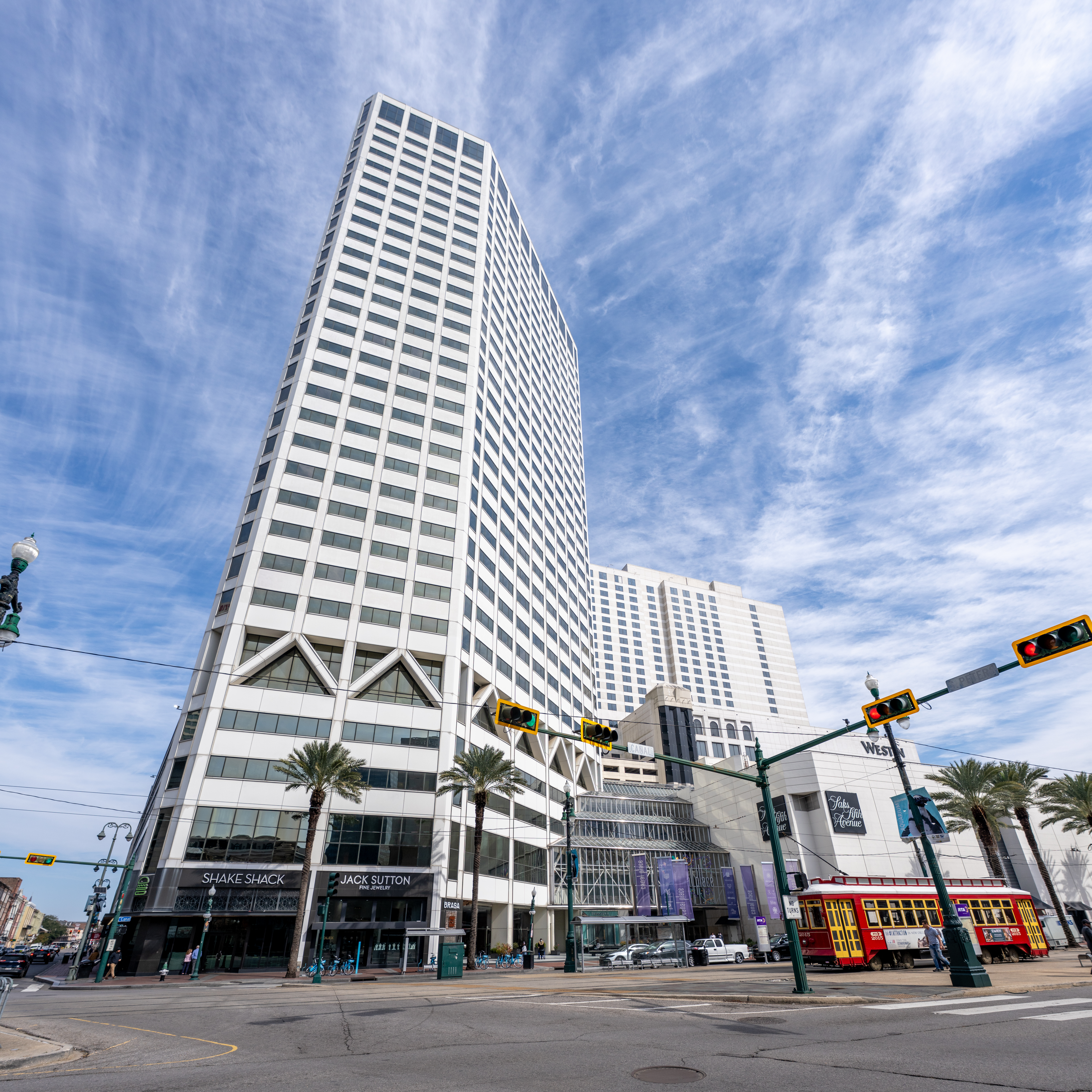
- (2026)
- Interactive map of the One Canal Place area

General information
- Type: Office, Retail
- Location: 365 Canal Street; New Orleans, Louisiana; United States
- Completed: 1979

Height
- Antenna spire: N/A
- Roof: 440 feet (134 m)

Technical details
- Floor count: 32
- Floor area: Office: 684,294 sq ft (63,573.0 m^{2})

Design and construction
- Architect: August Perez & Associates

One Canal Place, located at 365 Canal Street in the Central Business District of New Orleans, Louisiana, is a 32-story, 440 feet (134 m)-tall skyscraper. The building contains The Shops at Canal Place and is attached to the Westin New Orleans Canal Place hotel, with which it shares a parking garage.

During the colonial era before levees were constructed, the land now occupied by the Canal Place complex was commonly covered by the waters of the Mississippi River. In the 1720s, a windmill was constructed near what is now Canal Street and North Peters Street. By the 20th century, the land was occupied by the American Sugar Refinery facilities. The 19th-century warehouses as well as Crossman Street (parallel to Canal Street) were removed to allow the construction of One Canal Place.

Phase 1 of the Canal Place project resulted in the construction of the office tower in 1979. The Saks Fifth Avenue retail store and Westin hotel were constructed in 1982-83 as Phase 2.

Plans are currently in the works for Canal Place Phase 3, a $220 million project which will feature a new mixed-use high-rise tower. The office building with more than 650,000 leaseable square feet is managed by Corporate Realty.

On June 5, 2026, just three months after a recent $28 million acquisition, the new owners of Canal Place filed for Chapter 11 bankruptcy protection.

== One Canal Place Office Tower ==
One Canal Place Office Tower is a Class A commercial office building managed by Corporate Realty. It is adjacent to the Westin New Orleans Hotel and The Shops at Canal Place. The office space is made up of more than 650,000 customizable square feet and includes a parking garage and health club facilities.

== The Shops at Canal Place ==
The lower 3 levels of the One Canal Place are occupied by The Shops at Canal Place, one of two shopping malls in downtown New Orleans (the other is The Outlet Collection at Riverwalk). The mall contains a Saks Fifth Avenue, The Theatres at Canal Place, food court and approximately 45 high-end retailers including Anthropologie, Brooks Brothers, Tory Burch, Michael Kors, Tiffany & Co, and Morton's The Steakhouse. Louis Vuitton opened in 2019. The Shops at Canal Place is leased and managed by O'Connor Management, LLC.

In the aftermath of Hurricane Katrina, a fire inflicted heavy damage to the Saks Fifth Avenue. The mall reopened in February 2006, and a completely remodeled Saks reopened in November.

On February 10, 2026, it was announced that Saks Fifth Avenue would be closing as part of a plan to close 8 stores nationwide.

== The Westin New Orleans at Canal Place ==
The Westin New Orleans Canal Place is along the Mississippi River and adjacent to the historical French Quarter. It is right across the street from Harrah's Casino, upscale shopping, museums, art galleries, and the central business district.

There is a 29th floor rooftop pool, with a gym, and the River 127' Restaurant which is 127 feet (39 m) above the river.

== See also ==
- List of tallest buildings in New Orleans
- List of tallest buildings in Louisiana
