= American Italian Cultural Center =

Coordinates: 29.947599°N 90.066073°W

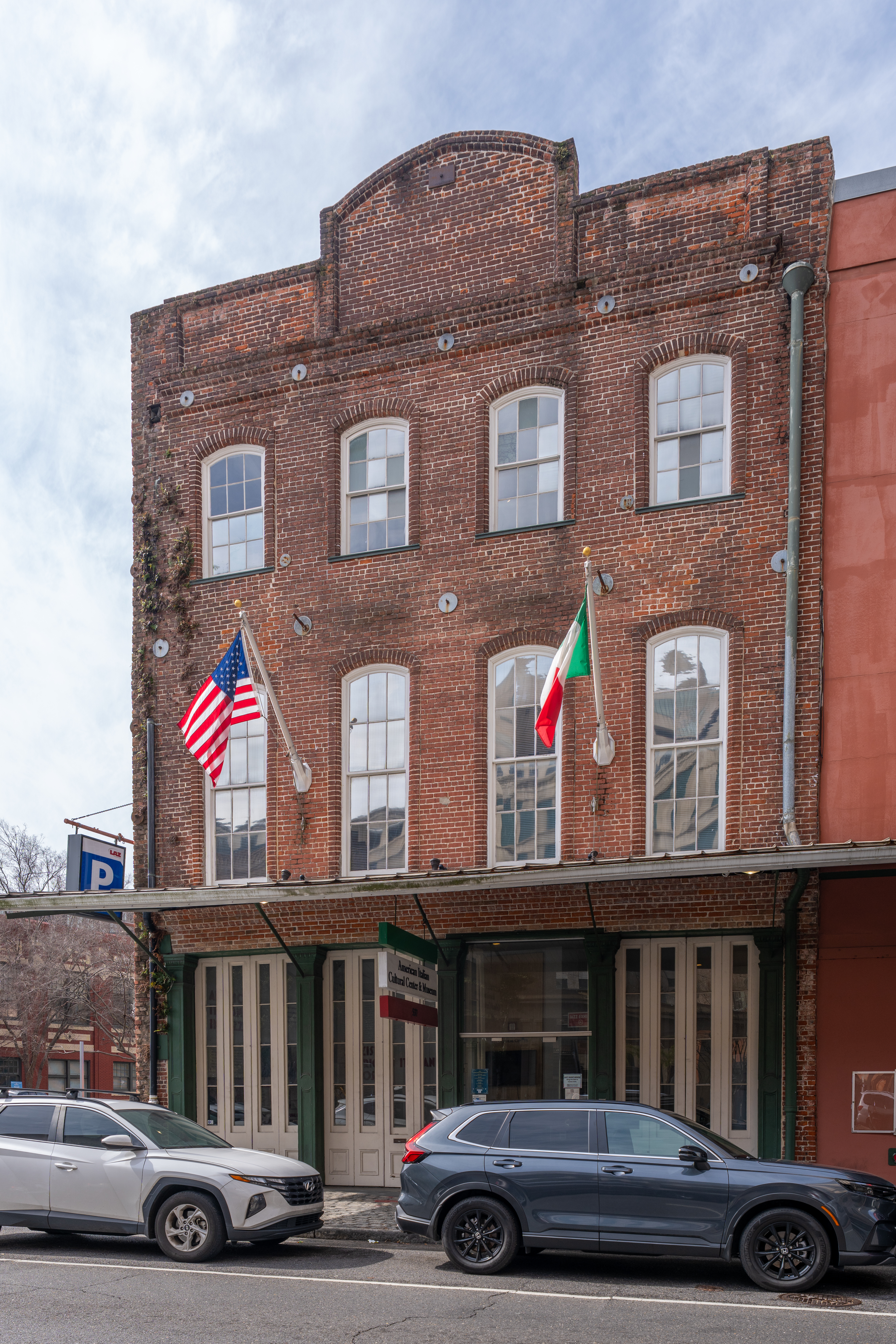
- Formation: 1985
- Founder: Joseph Maselli
- Legal status: Non-Profit
- Location: New Orleans, LA
- Parent organization: American Italian Renaissance Foundation
- Website: http://americanitalianculturalcenter.com/

The American Italian Cultural Center (AICC) is a nonprofit institution in New Orleans, Louisiana, whose mission is to honor and celebrate Italian American history and culture in Louisiana. Founded in 1985 by Joseph Maselli and adjacent to New Orleans's renowned Piazza d'Italia, the AICC offers Italian language courses, concerts, events, trips to Italy, and dual-citizenship applications, as well as promotes other Italian American organizations and their events. The AICC also houses an Honorary Consul of Italy. It operates under the parent organization of the American Italian Renaissance Foundation.

The AICC is home to the American Italian Museum and the Louisiana American Italian Sports Hall of Fame. The museum's focus is the heritage and contributions of American Italians in the Southeast, particularly the Italians in New Orleans. Displays include photographs, articles, family histories and memorabilia.

The AICC hosts an annual St. Joseph's Day celebration in October, as well as a Festa d'Italia in the Piazza.

The AICC publishes the quarterly Italian American Digest; and it oversees the American Italian Research Library, located in the New Orleans suburb of Metairie.

== Honorary Consul ==
Current Chairman Frank Maselli, son of AICC founder Joseph Maselli, serves as an Honorary Consul of Italy. The chairman performs limited consul duties, such as student visas. Other consulate duties for the state of Louisiana fall under the jurisdiction of the Consulate General of Houston.

== Membership ==
Membership with the American Italian Cultural Center is a large part of taking the courses and includes discounts at many local Italian restaurants. Membership is offered at different levels.

== Louisiana Italian American Sports Hall of Fame ==
The AICC is home to the Louisiana Italian American Sports Hall of Fame, and hosts an annual banquet for the honorees. The banquet also includes the Dr. Adriani Medical Education Award, the Louisiana American Italian Woman of the Year, the Joseph Maselli Heritage Award, the American Veteran Award, the Louis Prima Arts & Entertainment Award, and the Buddy “D” Media Award.

== See also ==
- Italians in New Orleans
- Logue House in Houston, Texas, which houses the Italian Cultural and Community Center (ICCC)
