= Mississippi Aerial River Transit =

Former gondola lift system in New Orleans, Louisiana, United States

MART
- Mississippi Aerial River Transit
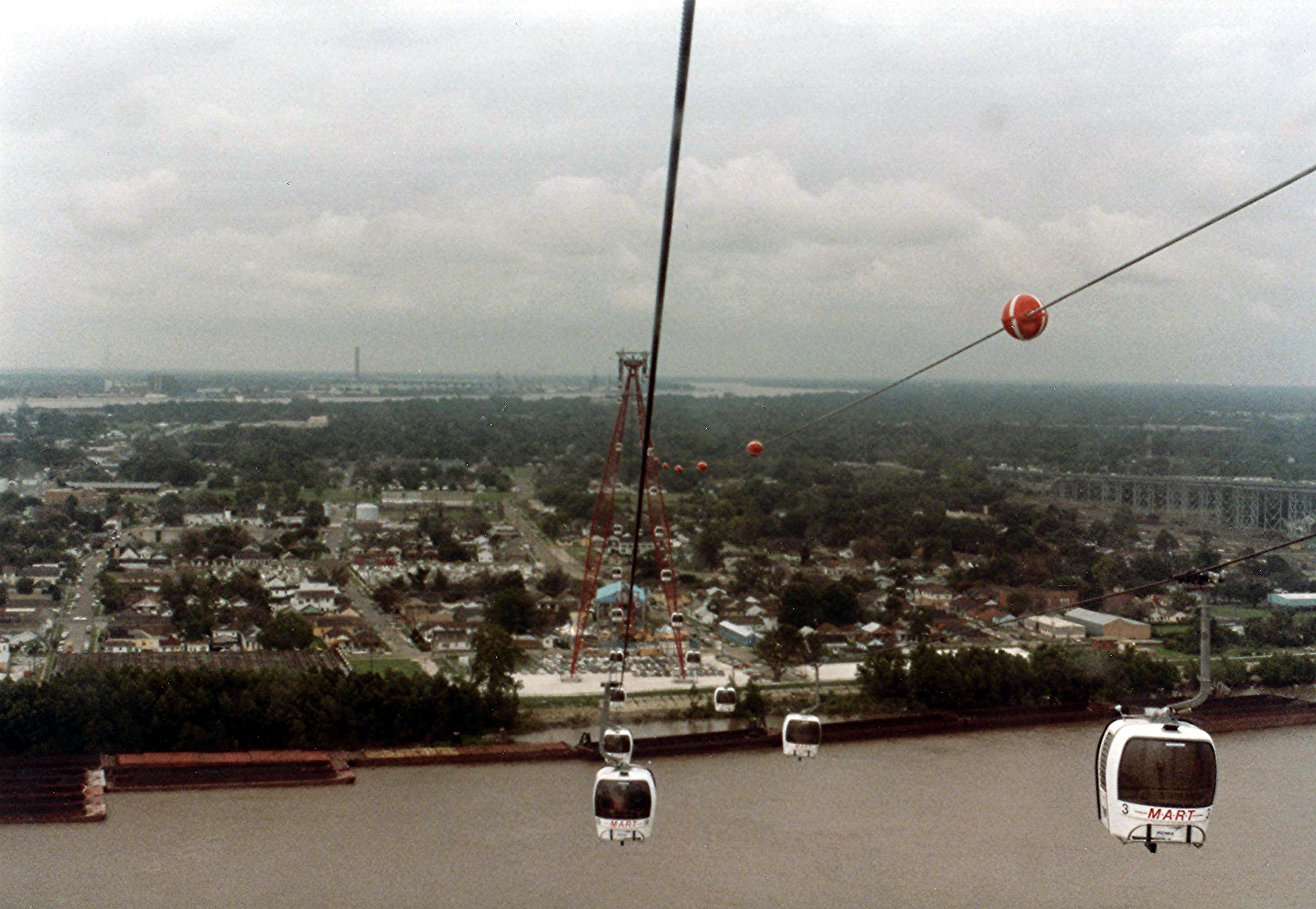
- During the World Fair, 1984
- Interactive map of MART

Overview
- Status: Dismantled in 1994
- Location: New Orleans
- Coordinates: 29°56′40″N 90°03′45″W
- Termini: Algiers, New Orleans; Warehouse District (the fair site)
- No. of stations: 2
- Open: April 1984
- Closed: April 1985

Operation
- No. of carriers: 53
- Carrier capacity: 6
- Ridership: (max.) 2,000 hourly
- Operating times: 10 am – 2 am
- Trip duration: 4 min
- Fare: $3.50 roundtrip

Technical features
- Aerial lift type: gondola lift
- Manufactured by: Pomagalski SA
- Line length: 2,300 feet (701 m)
- No. of support towers: 2

The Mississippi Aerial River Transit, or simply MART, was a gondola lift transport system spanning the Mississippi River in New Orleans, Louisiana, United States. It was constructed for the 1984 Louisiana World Exposition. After the fair, this served as the second urban aerial lift and the first gondola lift commuter system in the United States, in operation for just a year before closing.

The system featured 53 separate cars, a 2,300 feet (700 m) cross-river cable, twin steel towers that lifted the cable 200 feet (61 m) into the air, two station houses, concrete pillars that anchored the cable and two 358 feet (109 m) steel towers. Each of the two main towers were supported with 12-inch (300 mm) steel piles driven 285 feet (87 m) into the ground, with each tower weighing 200 short tons (180 t). Its twin towers were the tallest ever constructed for a gondola lift at the time. (The London Cable Car in the UK, built nearly three decades later, would exceed this former record by 50%.)

== History ==
Plans for the gondola were initially approved by the city on May 6, 1982. It was developed by the Mississippi Aerial River Transit-Perez Inc., or MART-Perez, which included noted local architect August Perez III. In 1983, the Banque de l'Union Européenne of Paris provided financing for the project through an $8 million loan. In foreshadowing the future problems the gondola would face, on its maiden crossing, after being blessed by Archbishop Philip Hannan, the ride would temporarily stall.

The ride took four minutes to complete and crossed over 300 feet (91 m) above the Mississippi River, and had a maximum capacity of 2,000 passengers per hour.

During the fair, this was billed as the signature ride of the exhibition; however, it drew only 1.7 million riders, half as many as projected. Built to showcase a form of non-polluting commuter transit, after the fair the system was open for use by commuters traveling from Algiers in the Mississippi's West Bank to the Warehouse District across the river, where the fair was held. By April 1985, the system would shut down due to low ridership.

Later in 1985, the Banque de l'union européenne would file suit against MART-Perez when they defaulted on the $8 million loan. As a result of nonpayment, in 1986, MART was ordered by a federal court to pay the bank $5 million, plus $1.2 million in interest and attorney fees. However, MART never made a payment, and as a result, the gondola was seized by the United States Marshals Service in June 1989. After the seizure, the system was put up for auction in August with New York City businessman Moey Segal placing the winning bid of $1.6 million.

Segal intended to deconstruct the system and relocate it to Corpus Christi, Texas. It was intended to transport tourists from the primary hotel area to the Texas State Aquarium across the ship channel. Due to litigation, the proposal to move the system to Texas was dropped and Segal transferred its ownership to the 7349 Corp in 1990.

Following the failed proposal to relocate the gondola, the system was the site of several, notable local events prior to its demolition. On January 21, 1993, Christopher Vincent base-jumped from the top of the East Bank tower twice. He completed the stunt for the first time at approximately 10:30 a.m. and again later that afternoon at approximately 2:30 p.m. Each time he was successful in landing on the Mississippi River levee.(Note: There is no levee at the East Bank location; a concrete flood wall exists, but would be unsuitable for landing on, as it's only about two feet thick. There is a levee at the West Bank tower location.)

On August 19, 1993, four Greenpeace activists were successful in hanging a banner from the system that stated "Break the circle of poison" in protesting the shipment of toxic pesticides through the Port of New Orleans.

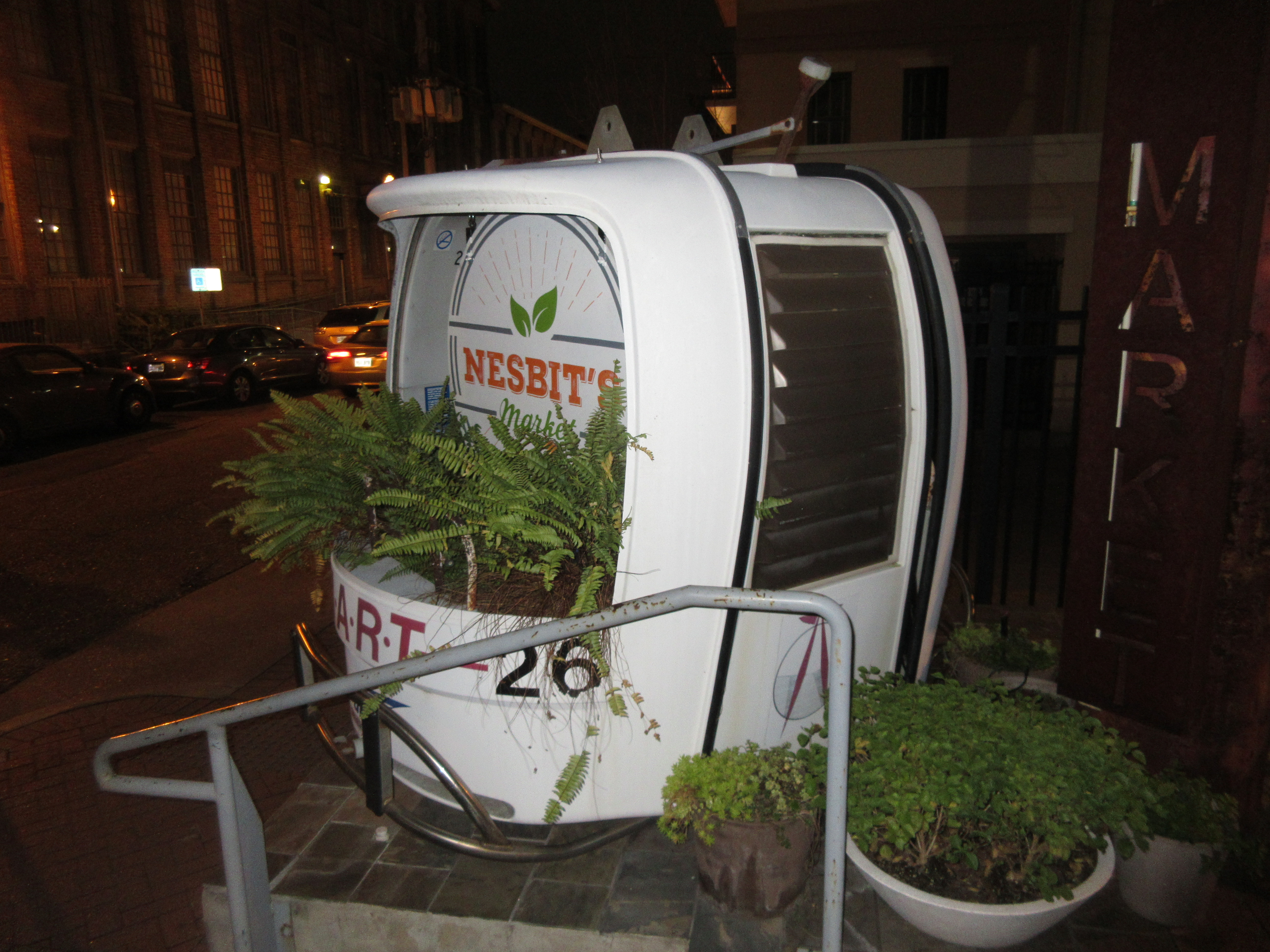
One of the old MART gondola cars used as decoration outside of a shop in New Orleans Warehouse District, 2019.

By late January 1993, the United States Coast Guard demanded that the system be demolished if it were not being used. In November 1993, the New Orleans City Council approved the demolition of the system and its demolition was complete by February 1994. Prior to its demolition, several of the cars were sold off and reused elsewhere. Some of these reuses included fishing huts, a deer stand, and conversion to a bus-stop shelter. Most notably, The Olde N'Awlins Cookery briefly utilized five of the cars as restaurant booths.

== Stations ==
- The station on the East Bank (of the Mississippi) – the warehouse district converted to be the Exposition site – was located at the foot of Julia Street, adjacent to what became the Ernest N. Morial Convention Center after the fair.
- The station on the West Bank was located along De Armas Street, located in Algiers.

== Companies involved in its construction ==
- MART-Perez, Inc. – developer
- Hewitt Washington & Associates – architect
- Perez Associates/Studio Three – design consultant
- Landis Construction – general contractor
- Pomagalski SA – production of the towers and gondola system
- Jenlynn International – tramway consultant
- Alpha Associates – tramway consultant
- Morphy, Makofsky and Masson – tower foundations and structural engineering
- Engineering Planning Group – electrical and mechanical engineering
- John F. Beasley Construction – tower installation
- Banque de l'Union européenne – financing

== In popular culture ==
Poster for the film French Quarter Undercover

- The attraction is featured in the 1985 action movie French Quarter Undercover, including being prominently shown on its movie posters.
