= Christ and the Samaritan Woman (Meštrović) =

Sculpture by Ivan Meštrović

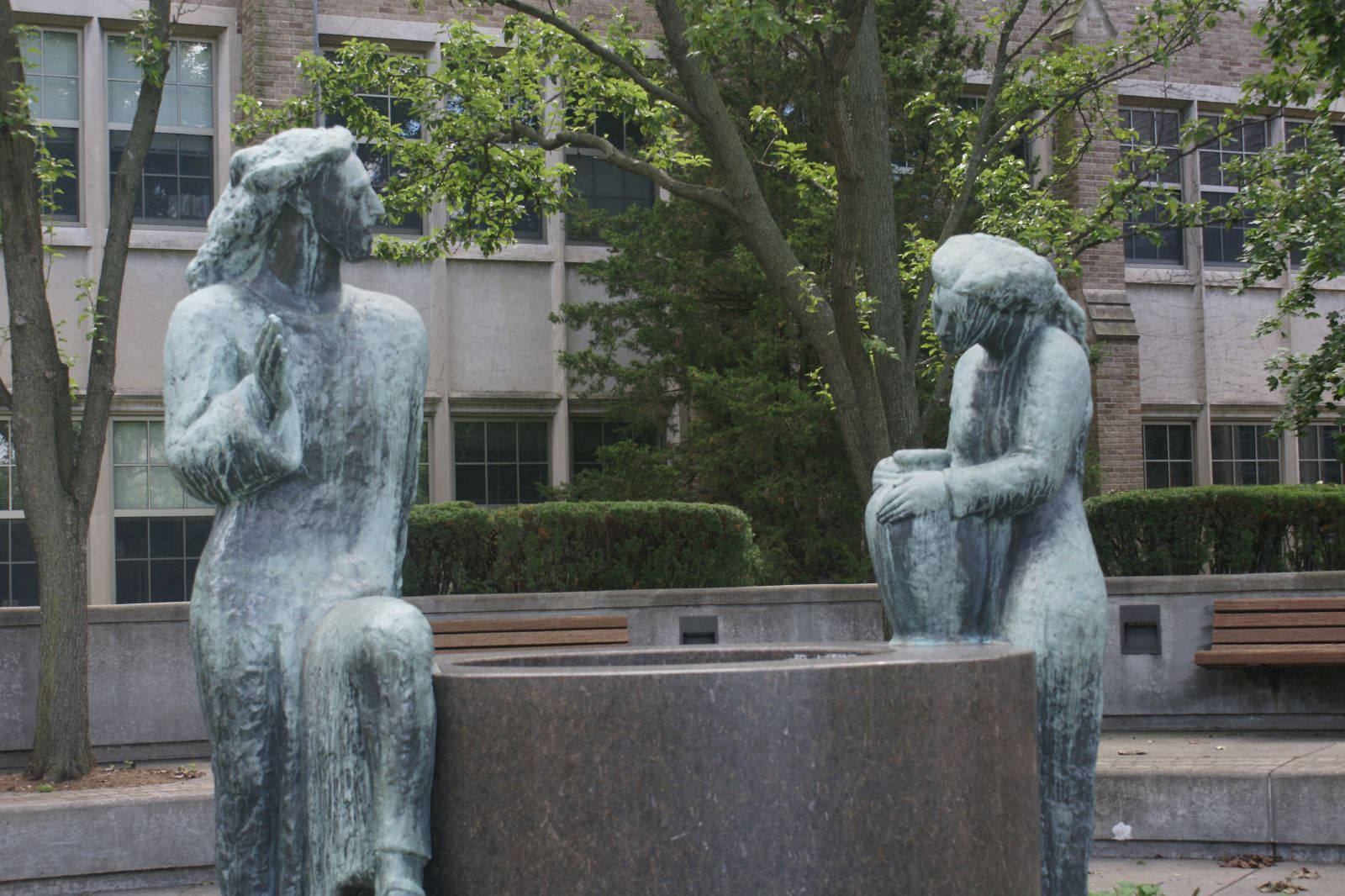

- Artist: Ivan Meštrović
- Year: 1957
- Type: Marble, Bronze
- Dimensions: 220 cm × 150 cm × 210 cm (88 in × 60 in × 84 in)
- Location: University of Notre Dame; Notre Dame, Indiana, United States; 41°42′01″N 86°14′10″W
- Owner: University of Notre Dame

Christ and the Samaritan Woman is an outdoor sculpture by Croatian sculptor Ivan Meštrović. Created in 1957, the sculpture resides in front of O’Shaughnessy Hall on the campus of the University of Notre Dame as part of the Shaheen-Mestrovic Memorial, which was completed in 1985 by the Department of Landscape Architecture and Planning in the South Bend office of Cole Associates. The marble and bronze sculpture depicts the events in John 4, in which Jesus converses and evangelizes to a woman from Samaria, with whom the Jews would not normally associate. Eli J. Shaheen, a Notre Dame alum, was the donor for the project, which is owned by the university. The “Woman at the Well,” as it is often referred, is flanked by sculptures of the gospel writers Luke the Evangelist and John the Evangelist. It has been regarded as the most notable and celebrated of Meštrović's works from his period at Notre Dame.

== History ==
Ivan Meštrović was a Croatian sculptor (1883–1962). Throughout his life, he lived all throughout Europe, in Rome, Vienna, Belgrade and Zagreb, and traveled to many other European cities with his art collections. He was exiled for a time from his home in Yugoslavia for political reasons during World War I. He became an art professor, and often donated his work to the Catholic Church if they were not able to pay for it.

During World War II, Mestrovic refused to cooperate with the “puppet” Croatian government set up by Adolf Hitler and the Axis powers. He was put in jail. When released, he and his family fled to Rome. No longer able to return to Croatia after the war, he accepted a professor position at Syracuse University in 1946. In 1955, Mestrovic moved to the University of Notre Dame to be the sculptor-in-residence and a “Distinguished Professor”, where then-president, Father Theodore Hesburgh, built him a studio.

At Notre Dame, Mestrovic created many art pieces that reside on campus, and his influence is seen in pieces created by his students as well. As he said, “Sculpture and art in general should contribute to human civilization, to human progress and mankind’s spiritual development.” As such, much of his work on Notre Dame's campus is religious in nature, including his famous replica of the Pietà statue housed in the Basilica of the Sacred Heart, Notre Dame.

While at Notre Dame, Mestrovic worked primarily with plaster due to his advanced age and the difficulty of handling and working with large blocks of marble or wood. Several of his works were not cast into bronze until after his death. Among these were the 1956-58 Madonna and Child in the courtyard of Lewis Hall and a superb 1947 plaster portrait of his wife Olga.

A bronze copy of the statue, cast from the original molds with permission of Mestrovic's widow, was exhibited at the Vatican pavilion at the 1984 Louisiana World Exposition and is found today at the Notre Dame Seminary in New Orleans. It was installed in front of Shaw Hall and dedicated in 1989 by Archbishop Philip Hannan.

The Shaheen-Mestrovic Memorial was constructed in 1985 by Cole Associates and placed on the South Quad on the west side of O’Shaughnessy Hall. The memorial was intended as a gathering space and a location of the exposition and appreciation of Mestrovic's work. It was planned by Frederick Beckman, chair of the Department of Art, Art History and Design. The figures of the evangelists Luke and John were placed around the central figures of Jesus and the Samaritan woman. Eli J. Shaheen, a Notre Dame alum, was the donor for the project.

== Description ==
Christ and the Samaritan Woman is a larger-than-life-size marble and bronze sculpture. Two bronze figures, Jesus and the Samaritan Woman, surround the marble well. The Christ figure looks upward, hand raised as if speaking. The woman holds a water jug and looks downcast. Meštrović also completed a smaller-scale version of the same piece, composed of plaster. It measures 28 by 23 inches, and, at the date of print of the 1974 collection, is part of the Notre Dame Art Gallery collection, being a gift from Rev. Theodore Hesburgh. The piece itself has some visual wear, as the aging bronze has obtained a greenish tint over the years weathering snow, rain, and immense heat in the upper-midwestern South Bend. The sculpture underwent conservation work in 2019 by Kline Fine Art, LLC - Cedar Springs, Michigan.

=== Biblical reference ===
Based on the events chronicled in the Gospel of John, Chapter 4, Christ meets a Samaritan woman at a well. He asks her for a drink, and the woman is surprised, because Jews and Samaritans do not normally associate with one another. Jesus then speaks of the living water, the water which will satisfy all thirst, and tells her that He is the Messiah. This story emphasizes unity amongst those of different backgrounds.

== Analysis ==
Like many of the other works from Mestrovic's Notre Dame period, this sculpture was both religious in nature and inspired by previous work he had done in Croatia. Indeed, Mestrovic had previously sculpted the episode of the Samaritan woman at the well thirty years earlier in 1927, for the wood relief in a chapel in Split. The compositions for the two sculptures are quite similar, with two noticeable changes in the Notre Dame work, the position of the Samaritan woman's head and in a more relaxed attitude of Christ. Instead, there are noticeable stylistic changes. While garments in the 1927 works are diaphanous, clinging and enveloping the bodies and decorated with graceful and sinuous motifs, the 1957 forms present heavy folds, casually draped over the limbs. An even more significant difference is the relationship and the strong sense of communication between the two Christ and the woman. This symbolizes' Meštrović interest on depicting the spiritual impact of the figures rather than the form and style.

== Use ==
The Shaheen-Mestrovic Memorial, and especially the “Christ and the Samaritan Woman” statue, is used for many purposes by students and faculty on campus. During the day, students sit around the memorial. Some student groups and residence halls hold prayer services, retreat activities, reflection time, or faith meetings by the statue. In November 2016, Father John I. Jenkins, President of the University of Notre Dame, held an interfaith prayer service for the campus community in front of the statue. Held in conjunction with Notre Dame Student Government, the service sought to “support everyone affected by the recent election,” with an invitation to “join us for this service of compassion as we pray for peace and unity in our nation,” sent to all students.

== See also ==
- Touchdown Jesus
