= August Perez III =

August Perez III (1933 – December 5, 2014) was an architect based in New Orleans, Louisiana.

During his practice, Perez made significant contributions to the urban form of New Orleans, including projects such as the 1984 World's Fair (including the Mississippi Aerial River Transit gondola), the Piazza d'Italia, New Orleans, the Ernest N. Morial Convention Center, Harrah's Casino, One Canal Place and Zephyr Stadium. Perez was also involved in the initial design of Denver International Airport.

Perez was a founding member of the Krewe of Bacchus and its captain from 1982 to 1989. The Krewe's tandem floats, such as the 106-foot-long Bacchagator float designed by Kern Studios were inspired by Perez: while sitting in a plane at the airport, he observed the wagons pulling luggage carts and how each cart turned at the same spot where the previous one had, and wondered if segmented floats could work based on the same principle.

Perez graduated from Alcée Fortier High School and received an architecture degree from Tulane University in 1956.

Perez was on the board of the Louisiana Association of Architects.

He died on December 5, 2014, at age 81.

His firm, under different ownership, continues to operate.
