= Central Grocery =

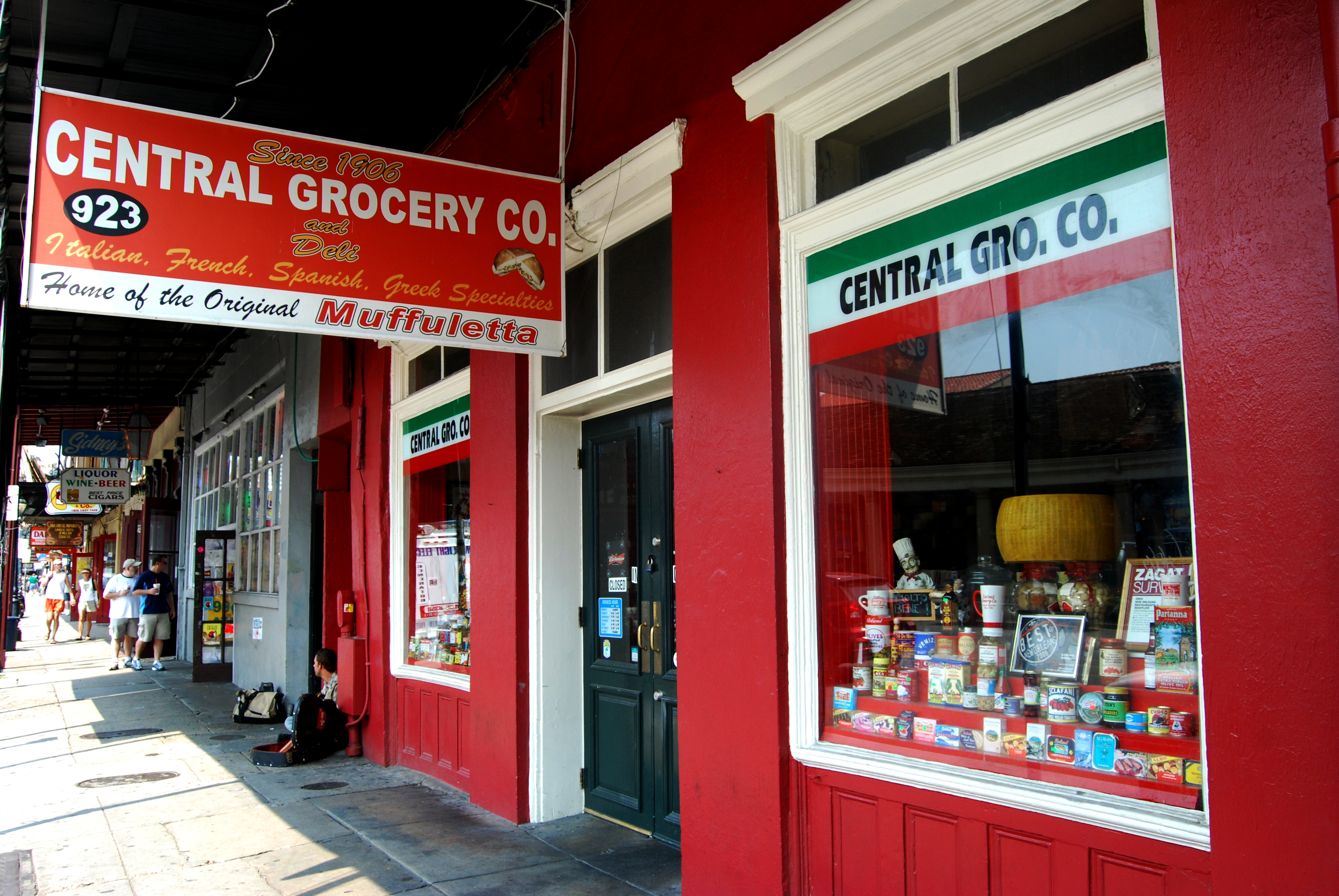
- Outside Central Grocery on Decatur Street
- Interactive map of Central Grocery

Restaurant information
- Established: 1906
- Owner: Salvador T. Tusa
- Food type: Italian, Greek, French, Spanish, and Creole table delicacies
- Location: 923 Decatur Street, French Quarter of New Orleans, Louisiana, United States
- Coordinates: 29.9587°N 90.0609°W
- Website: http://www.centralgrocerynola.com/

Central Grocery Co. is a small, old-fashioned Italian-American grocery store with a sandwich counter, located at 923 Decatur Street in the French Quarter of New Orleans, Louisiana. It was founded in 1906 by Salvatore Lupo, a Sicilian immigrant. He operated it until 1946 when he retired and his son-in-law Frank Tusa took over the operation. It is currently owned by Salvador T. Tusa, Salvatore's grandson, and two cousins, Frank Tusa and Larry Tusa. The store was one of many family-owned, neighborhood grocery stores during the early 20th century, when the French Quarter was still predominantly a residential area. Though tourists are more common in Central now, it has retained much of its old-world market feel.

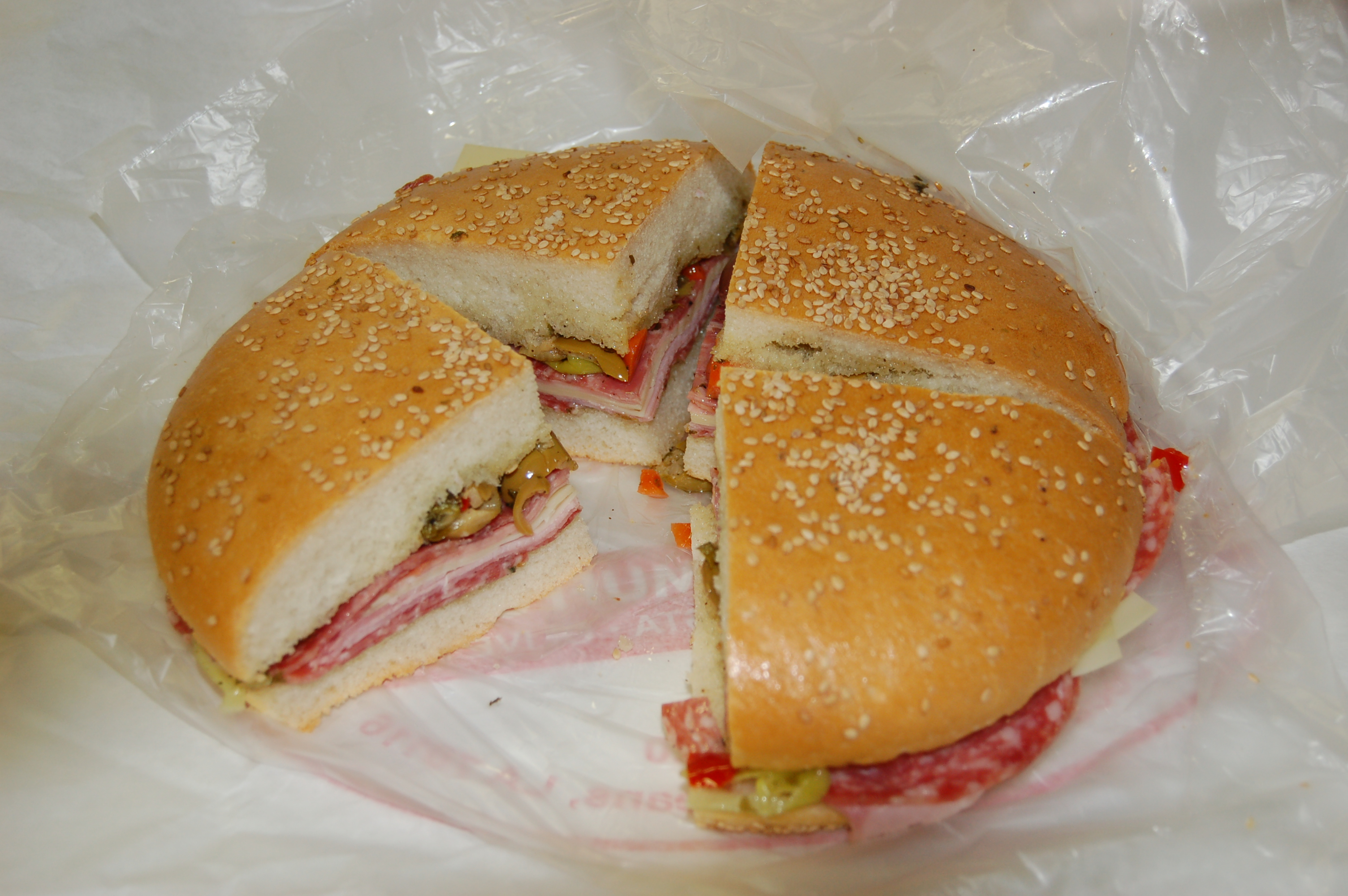
Take-out muffuletta from Central Grocery

The Central sells not only the sandwiches as take-out or eat-in, but also the ingredients of the muffuletta—including olive salad by the jar—for people who want to make the sandwich at home. Because of the muffuletta, Central Grocery was featured on national television, in the PBS special program Sandwiches That You Will Like, and on NBC's The Today Show (five best sandwiches series).

Central Grocery sells Italian, Greek, French, Spanish, and Creole table delicacies. They also carry less-mainstream selections, such as chocolate-covered grasshoppers and bumble bees in soy sauce, which are perennially displayed in the store's front windows. Marie Lupo Tusa, Salvatore's daughter, is author of the cookbook Marie's Melting Pot, which has hundreds of Sicilian, French, and Creole-style recipes.

Following Hurricane Ida in August 2021, Central Grocery sustained damage to the roof, exacerbated by the rains of Hurricane Nicholas in September. After substantial rebuilding, Central Grocery reopened in their original location on 14 December 2024.

== See also ==
- French Market
- Italians in New Orleans
