= Piazza d'Italia (New Orleans) =

Public plaza in downtown New Orleans, Louisiana

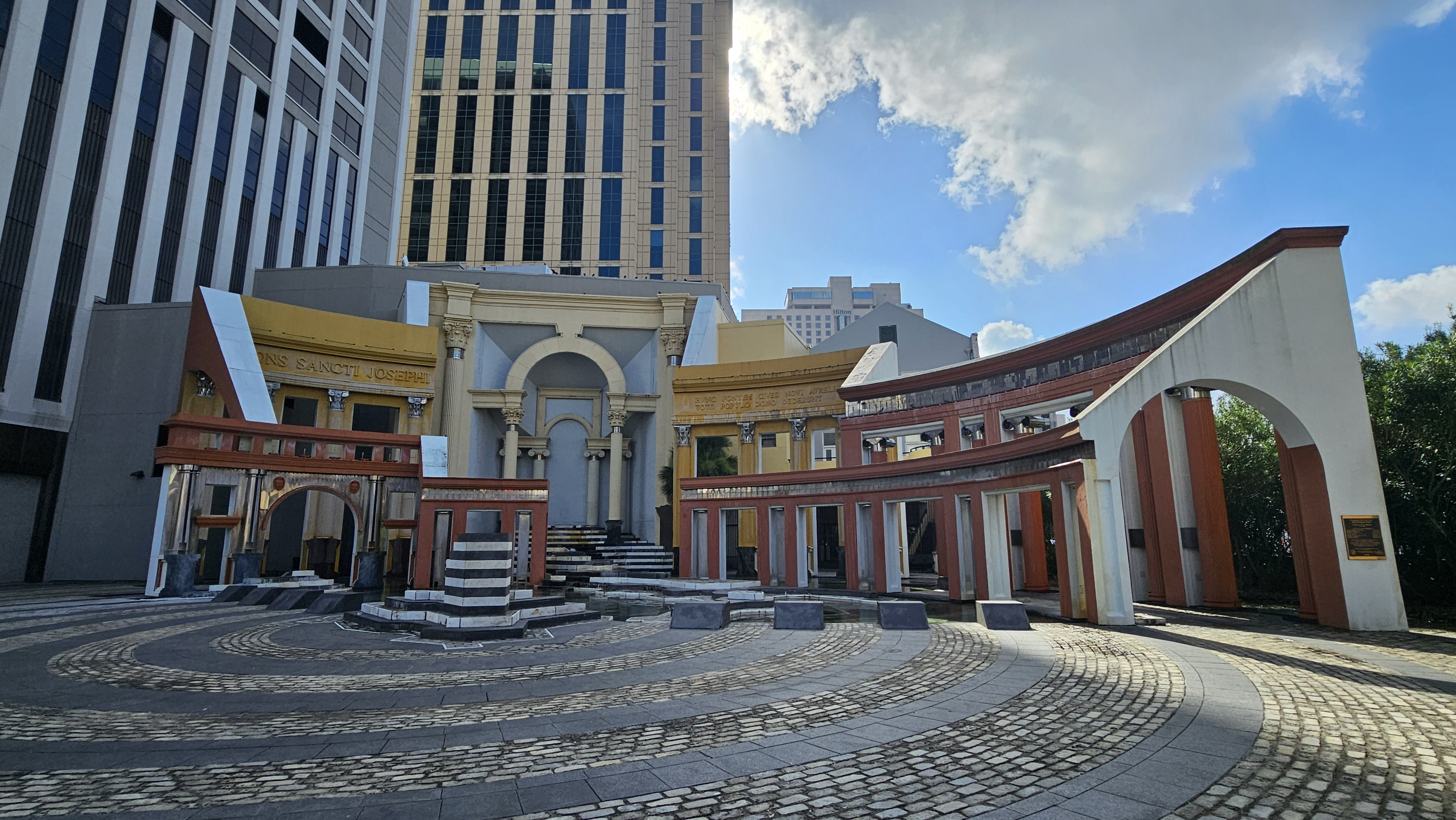
- Interactive map of Piazza d'Italia
- Location: New Orleans, Louisiana, United States
- Coordinates: 29.9584115°N 90.0641665°W
- Designer: Charles Moore and Perez Architects

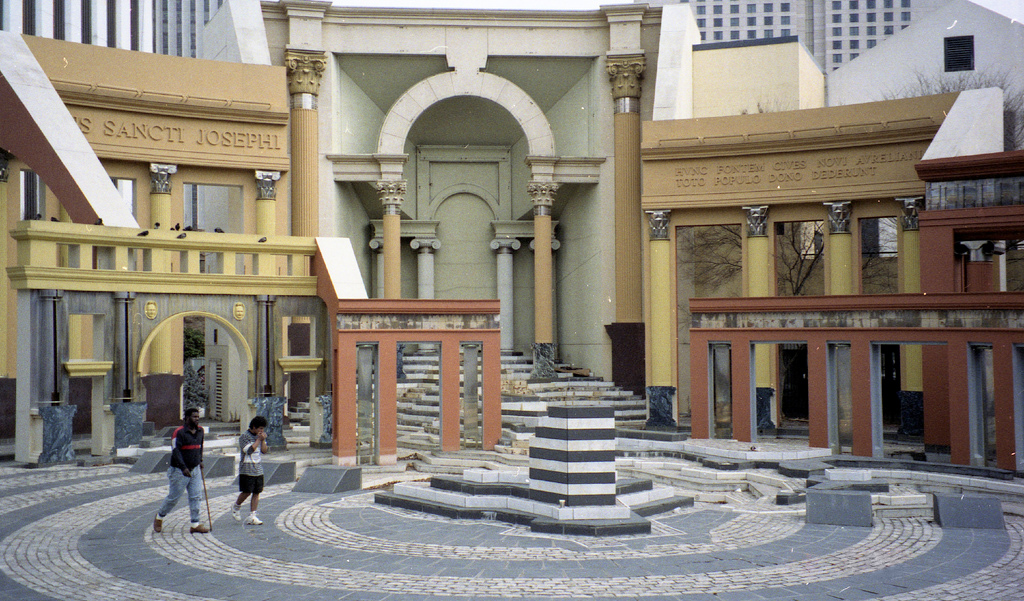
Piazza d'Italia by Charles Moore (with Perez Architects), New Orleans.

The Piazza d'Italia is an urban public plaza located behind the American Italian Cultural Center at Lafayette and Commerce Streets in downtown New Orleans, Louisiana. It is controlled by the New Orleans Building Corporation (NOBC), a public benefit corporation wholly owned by the City of New Orleans. Completed in 1978 according to a design by noted postmodern architect Charles Moore and Perez Architects of New Orleans, the Piazza d'Italia debuted to widespread acclaim on the part of artists and architects. Deemed an architectural masterpiece even prior to its completion, the Piazza in fact began to rapidly deteriorate as the development surrounding it was never realized. By the turn of the new millennium, the Piazza d'Italia was largely unfrequented by and unknown to New Orleanians, and was sometimes referred to as the first "postmodern ruin". The conversion of the adjacent Lykes Center to the Loews Hotel, New Orleans, completed in 2003, was accompanied by the full restoration of the Piazza d'Italia (accomplished by 2004).

== Early history and design ==
Though New Orleans received tens of thousands of Italian immigrants in the late 19th and early 20th centuries, that ethnic group's role in the city's cultural mix went largely unacknowledged, typically overshadowed by the seminal contributions of French and Spanish culture. In the early 1970s, leaders of New Orleans' Italian-American community conceived of a permanent public commemoration of the Italian immigrant experience in the city. New Orleans' downtown, despite receiving some prominent new investment (e.g., One Shell Square, the Superdome) was by this time suffering from many of the same ills infecting most American downtowns in the post-World War II era of suburbanization, white flight and urban disinvestment. New Orleans Mayor Moon Landrieu was committed to the improvement and revitalization of the city's struggling downtown and greeted with approval suggestions that the project be sited to encourage investment in the city center.

In 1974, Charles Moore, a prominent contemporary architect, former dean of the Yale School of Architecture and a proponent of a witty, exuberant design language later termed postmodern architecture was approached to help realize the vision of New Orleans' Italian-American community. In collaboration with Ron Filson of UIG in Los Angeles and two young architects then practicing with the Perez firm in New Orleans, Malcolm Heard and Allen Eskew, Moore conceived of a public fountain in the shape of the Italian peninsula, surrounded by multiple hemicyclical colonnades, a clock tower, and a campanile and Roman temple - the latter two expressed in abstract, minimalist, space frame fashion. The central fountain, located in the middle of a city block, was accessed in two directions: via a tapering passage extending from Poydras Street, or through an arched opening in the clock tower sited where Commerce Street terminates at Lafayette Street. The fountain and its surrounding colonnades playfully appropriated classical forms and orders, executing them in modern materials (e.g., stainless steel, neon) or kinetically (e.g., suggesting the acanthus leaves of traditional Corinthian capitals through the use of water jets).

The location ultimately chosen for the Piazza d'Italia was a city block sited in the semi-derelict upriver edge of downtown, four blocks from Canal Street and the edge of the French Quarter and three blocks from the Mississippi River. By the mid-1970s, this area had already endured several decades of disfavor and was littered with abandoned or barely-utilized mid-19th century commercial row houses, early-20th century industrial architecture and obsolete port infrastructure. Taking a cue from Boston, Baltimore and other aging port cities who had, starting in the late 1960s, moved to redevelop their historic waterfronts, by the 1970s New Orleans sought to spur investment in what later became known as the Warehouse District. The Piazza d'Italia, it was hoped, would trigger a wave of investment in the Warehouse District and along New Orleans' downtown riverfront, and more generally ignite interest in downtown.

Essential to the Piazza's design was the full realization of its intended surroundings, which were to have included a rehabilitated historic row of 19th-century buildings facing Tchoupitoulas Street (buildings whose rear abutted the edge of the Piazza). The Perez team designed infill buildings to complement this anticipated historic restoration. The mixture of restored architecture and new construction was to have fully brought into being the context envisioned for the Piazza, such that it would function as a "surprise plaza" in the mode of the urban Mediterranean, wherein the pedestrian is proceeding unawares along a narrow passage or alley, only to suddenly emerge into a sunlit plaza ringed by cafes and shops. This intended effect was responsible for the placement of the Piazza d'Italia at the heart of a city block, set back from the surrounding streets.

== Inscription ==
The Piazza's fountain is inscribed in Latin, split into two sections.

On the left, FONS SANCTI JOSEPHI and on the right, HVNC FONTEM CIVES NOVI AVRELIANI TOTO POPULO DONO DEDERUNT.

This translates as: The Fountain of Saint Joseph: The citizens of New Orleans have given this fountain to all the people as a gift.

== Decline ==
The Piazza d'Italia struggled as an urban space almost from the moment of its completion in 1978. Neither public nor private funding was secured to pay for the further redevelopment of the block - the Lykes Center having preceded the Piazza's construction by several years - leaving the Piazza mostly invisible from the street and wedged between blight and the blank modernist facade of Lykes Steamship's headquarters. Without commercial tenants to subsidize maintenance, and with dwindling city budgets increasingly constrained - first by the incremental phase out of federal government revenue sharing, then due to the regional Oil Bust of the mid- to late-1980s - the plaza rapidly deteriorated, with the fountain rarely in operation and the fanciful neon and incandescent lighting accents going unreplaced and unrepaired. In 1987, the vacant historic row along Tchoupitoulas Street was heavily damaged by a fire and was demolished, resulting in the installation of a large surface parking lot adjacent to the Piazza. By 2000, the Piazza d'Italia was routinely cited as a "postmodern ruin", ironically echoing its far older classical antecedents.

Piazza d'Italia at night, May, 2010

== Restoration ==
In 2002 plans were announced to convert the by-then vacant Lykes Center adjacent to the Piazza into a Loews Hotel. The hotel's developers pledged $1 million to restore the Piazza to working order, and Perez Architects was hired to ensure a faithful restoration. In 2004, the fountain was restored to operation, though the badly deteriorated campanile on the site's extreme periphery was removed. The Piazza design's original vision of an urban "surprise plaza" remains only partially fulfilled, however, and must await the development of the adjacent surface parking lots for its realization.

== Recent developments ==
For years the Piazza and its surrounding surface parking lots were owned by the Piazza d'Italia Development Corporation. In 2013, this entity was merged with the Canal Street Development Corporation (CSDC), which was itself merged into the New Orleans Building Corporation (NOBC) in December 2016.

In 2013, Mayor Mitch Landrieu - Moon Landrieu's son - and officials with the Canal Street Development Corporation announced a $280,000 project to renovate the Piazza d’Italia, which was in need of additional maintenance and improvement some nine years after its major restoration was accomplished. The first phase of improvements included the installation of more Italian-style landscaping, creating a green screen for visual privacy between the Piazza and the adjacent parking lot, and the development of ADA-compliant restrooms with a new air-conditioning system. Funds for this project came from the Piazza d’Italia Enterprise Fund, controlled by the Canal Street Development Corp. “[These improvements are] not going to be funded with city general fund dollars,” Landrieu said at a news conference held at the site. “The dollars will be coming out of fees generated by the parking that is around this area.” In noting its importance to the local Italian-American community, Mayor Mitch Landrieu pointed out that he has Italian heritage on his mother's side.

Phase I of the renovations has been completed. The second phase was under construction and scheduled to be completed by the end of 2018. This phase restored every element of the fountain that needed repair or replacement, such that its full original conception is restored. The surrounding, city-owned surface parking lots remain undeveloped.
