= Muffuletta =

Bread and sandwich type

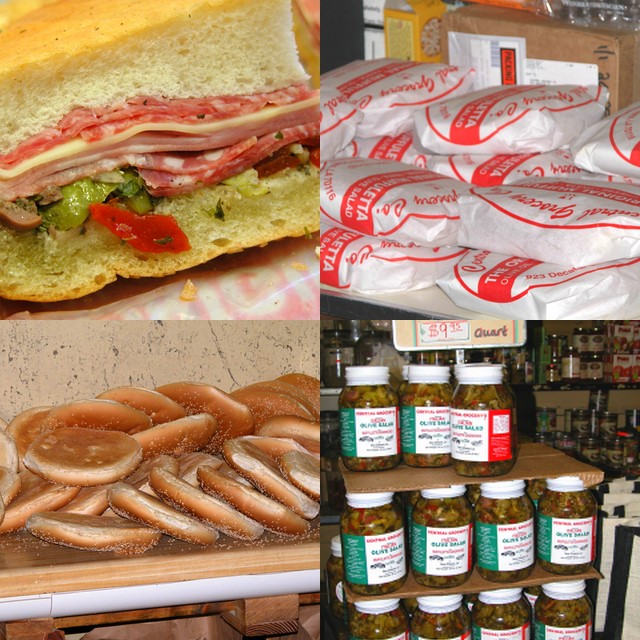
- Clockwise from top left: muffuletta cross section; muffuletta in wrappers; muffuletta-style olive salad; and circular muffuletta loaves
- Alternative names: Muffaletta
- Course: Main course
- Place of origin: Italy (bread); United States (sandwich)
- Region or state: Sicily; New Orleans
- Main ingredients: Bread: wheat flour, water, eggs, olive oil, yeast, salt, sugar Sandwich: marinated muffuletta-style olive salad, layers of mortadella, salami, Swiss cheese, ham, provolone

Muffuletta or muffaletta is a type of round Sicilian sesame bread, as well as a popular sandwich, created by a Sicilian immigrant to the United States, that was popularized in the city of New Orleans.

== Etymology, pronunciation, and orthography ==
The name is believed to be a diminutive form of muffi ('mold', 'mushroom'), perhaps due to the round sandwich bread being reminiscent of a mushroom cap; more likely from mùffula, 'muff', 'mitten'. Another theory suggests a possible French origin, considering that the word "mou" in French means "soft", referring to the tender and spongy texture of the bread. An alternative hypothesis points to a Saxon origin, due to the similarity with the English word "muffin", which refers to a small cake or bun, also known for its soft consistency. The forms muffoletta and its iterations are modern Italianisms of the original Sicilian. Like many of the foreign-influenced terms found in New Orleans, pronunciation has evolved from a phonetic forebear.

Depending on the specific Sicilian dialect, the item may be spelled:

- muffiletta
- mufiletta
- muffuletta
- muffulettu
- muffuletu
- muffulitteḍḍu
- muffulittuni
- mufuletta

The muffuletta is somewhat similar to the pan bagnat sandwich of Nice, France.

In a 1987 article in American Speech, linguists Edwin Eames and Howard Robboy identified the sandwich as a musalatta.

== History ==
The muffuletta sandwich is said to have been created in 1906 at Central Grocery Co. on Decatur Street, New Orleans, Louisiana, U.S., by its delicatessen owner Salvatore Lupo, a Sicilian immigrant. Sicilian immigrant Biaggio Montalbano, who was a delicatessen owner in New Orleans, is credited with invention of the Roma Sandwich, which may have been a forerunner of the muffuletta. Another Italian-style New Orleans delicatessen, Progress Grocery Co., originally opened in 1924 by the Perrone family, claims the origin of the muffuletta is uncertain.

The traditional-style muffuletta sandwich consists of a muffuletta loaf split horizontally and covered with layers of marinated muffuletta-style olive salad, salami, ham, Swiss cheese, provolone, and mortadella. Quarter, half, and full-sized muffulettas are sold.

The signature olive salad is a chopped salad made from green olives, black olives, olive oil, celery, cauliflower, carrots, sweet peppers, onions, capers, parsley, peperoncini, oregano, garlic, vinegar, herbs, and spices. It is a "piquant salad" used as a spread. Celery, cauliflower, and carrots are commonly found in the pickled form known as giardiniera. Capers and lemon juice may also be included. It is commercially produced for restaurants and for retail sale.

Muffuletta is usually served cold, but many vendors will toast it.

== See also ==
- List of American sandwiches
