= 1984 Louisiana World Exposition =

World's Fair in New Orleans

1984 New Orleans
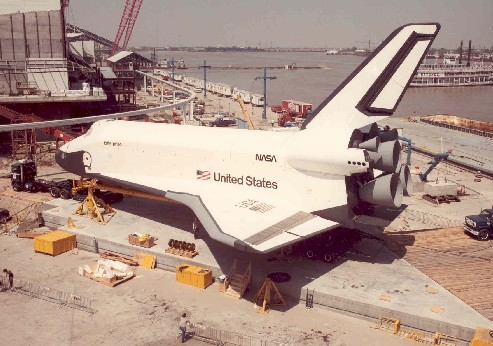
- Space Shuttle Enterprise at 1984 World Fair New Orleans

Overview
- BIE-class: Specialized exposition
- Category: International specialized exposition
- Name: Louisiana World Exposition
- Motto: World of Rivers
- Building(s): New Orleans Morial Convention Center
- Area: 84 acres (34 ha)
- Visitors: 7,335,279
- Organized by: Ralph Perlman
- Mascot: Seymour D. Fair

Participant(s)
- Countries: 95

Location
- Country: United States
- City: New Orleans
- Coordinates: 29°56′40″N 90°03′45″W

Timeline
- Opening: May 12, 1984
- Closure: November 11, 1984

Specialized expositions
- Previous: 1982 World's Fair in Knoxville
- Next: Expo '85 in Tsukuba

Universal expositions
- Previous: Expo '70 in Osaka
- Next: Seville Expo '92 in Seville

Horticultural expositions
- Previous: International Garden Expo 83 in Munich
- Next: Expo '90 in Osaka

Simultaneous
- Horticultural (AIPH): International Garden Festival

The 1984 Louisiana World Exposition was a world's fair held in New Orleans, Louisiana, United States. It was held 100 years after the city's earlier world's fair, the World Cotton Centennial in 1884. The fair was held from May 12 to November 11, 1984, and adopted the theme "The World of Rivers: Fresh Water as a Source of Life," showcasing the vital role of freshwater systems.

The 1984 Louisiana World Exposition encountered significant attendance challenges, ultimately becoming the only world's fair to declare bankruptcy during its operation. Several factors likely contributed to this. The exposition's proximity (both in geography and year) to the 1982 World's Fair in Knoxville, Tennessee may have limited interest in the expansion among residents of the Southern United States, as that region had already hosted one two years prior. Additionally, the 1984 Summer Olympics in Los Angeles and the 1982 opening of Walt Disney World's Epcot (often referred to as a "permanent world's fair") presented substantial competition for visitors.

As of 2025, there has not been a world's fair in the United States since the 1984 Louisiana World Exposition.

== The Fair ==
The government of Louisiana spent $5 million on the fair; that amount was overseen by Ralph Perlman, the state budget director, who tried to obtain maximum use of the funds. An 84-acre (340,000 m^{2}) site along the Mississippi River was cleared of rundown warehouses, replaced by the structures of the Fair. This was to be a "Class B" exposition as defined by the Bureau International des Expositions (BIE), the international body governing world's fairs. There were no major exhibits such as had been seen at the 1964–65 New York World's Fair, which started predictions that the fair could be a flop.

Although 7 million guests toured the fair, it was not enough to recoup the $350 million spent to host the event. Paychecks started bouncing, and it was only through government intervention that the gates remained open through the scheduled run. The fair drew 30,000 fewer people in the first month than was predicted.

One of the fair's more famous attractions was the Mississippi Aerial River Transit (MART). This was a gondola lift that took visitors across the Mississippi River from the fair site in the Warehouse District to Algiers on the West Bank. Also on display was the Space Shuttle Enterprise.

The Fair was held along the Mississippi River front near the New Orleans Central Business District, on a site that was formerly a railroad yard. While the Fair itself was a financial failure, several old warehouses were renovated for the fair, which helped to revitalize the adjacent Old Warehouse District. The fair suffered from poor attendance, but many New Orleanians have fond memories of their fair experiences. Highlights included a monorail, a gondola across the Mississippi River, an aquacade, an amphitheater for concerts, the Wonderwall, and many dining choices, including the Italian Village, the Japanese Pavilion, and Pete Fountain's Reunion Hall.

== Navy participation ==
U.S. Navy's host ship for the 1984 World's Fair was the USS Stump.

USS Lexington visited the fair and was open for tourist visits while much of the crew enjoyed liberty.

USS Harlan County visited the fair for three days and was open for tourist visits, while much of the crew enjoyed liberty.

USS Trippe (FF -1075) visited the site for four days and was open to tours from the public, while the crew enjoyed liberty.

== Mascot ==
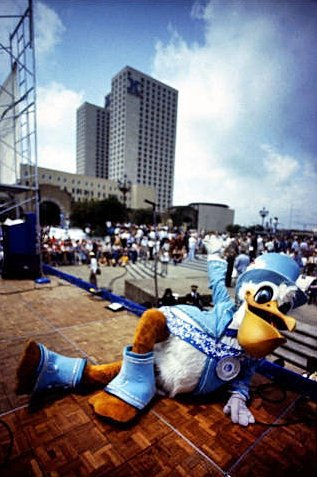
Fair mascot "Seymour D. Fair".

This expo also had the distinction of being the first World Exposition in the history of expos to have an official fair mascot. Seymour D. Fair, a large white costume pelican, became one of the most recognizable figures of any modern-day World Exposition.

== Legacy ==
Some traces of the fair remain today. In the Warehouse District, many of the streets were improved and many old buildings were renovated for businesses that hoped to cater to fair guests. These buildings later were converted to commercial and residential uses. These improvements paved the way for the city's arts district seen today.

The Riverwalk Marketplace and the Ernest N. Morial Convention Center are perhaps the fair's greatest legacy. The exhibition hall of the convention center was the fair's Louisiana Pavilion, it later reopened as a convention center in 1985. Next to the convention center on the corner of Tchoupitoulas and Henderson streets is a steel and fiberglass bust of Neptune and the head of one of his alligators. At the fair, the statues of Neptune, a mermaid and some alligators surrounding them made up Bridge Gate, one of the entrances to the fair. Most other structures and the MART were demolished after the fair closed. The monorails were moved to Florida and re-used at Zoo Miami. Despite its problems, the fair is fondly remembered by many New Orleans residents, particularly for its noteworthy post-modern architecture, such as the groundbreaking Wonderwall designed by noted architect Charles Willard Moore and his partner William Turnbull.

A bronze copy of Ivan Meštrović's sculpture Christ and the Samaritan Woman was exhibited at the Vatican pavilion and is found today at the Notre Dame Seminary in New Orleans.

On November 11, 2014, on the Fair's 30th Anniversary, a large bronze commemorative plaque was unveiled at the corner of Julia Street and Convention Center Boulevard, the heart of the world fair site.

== Gallery ==
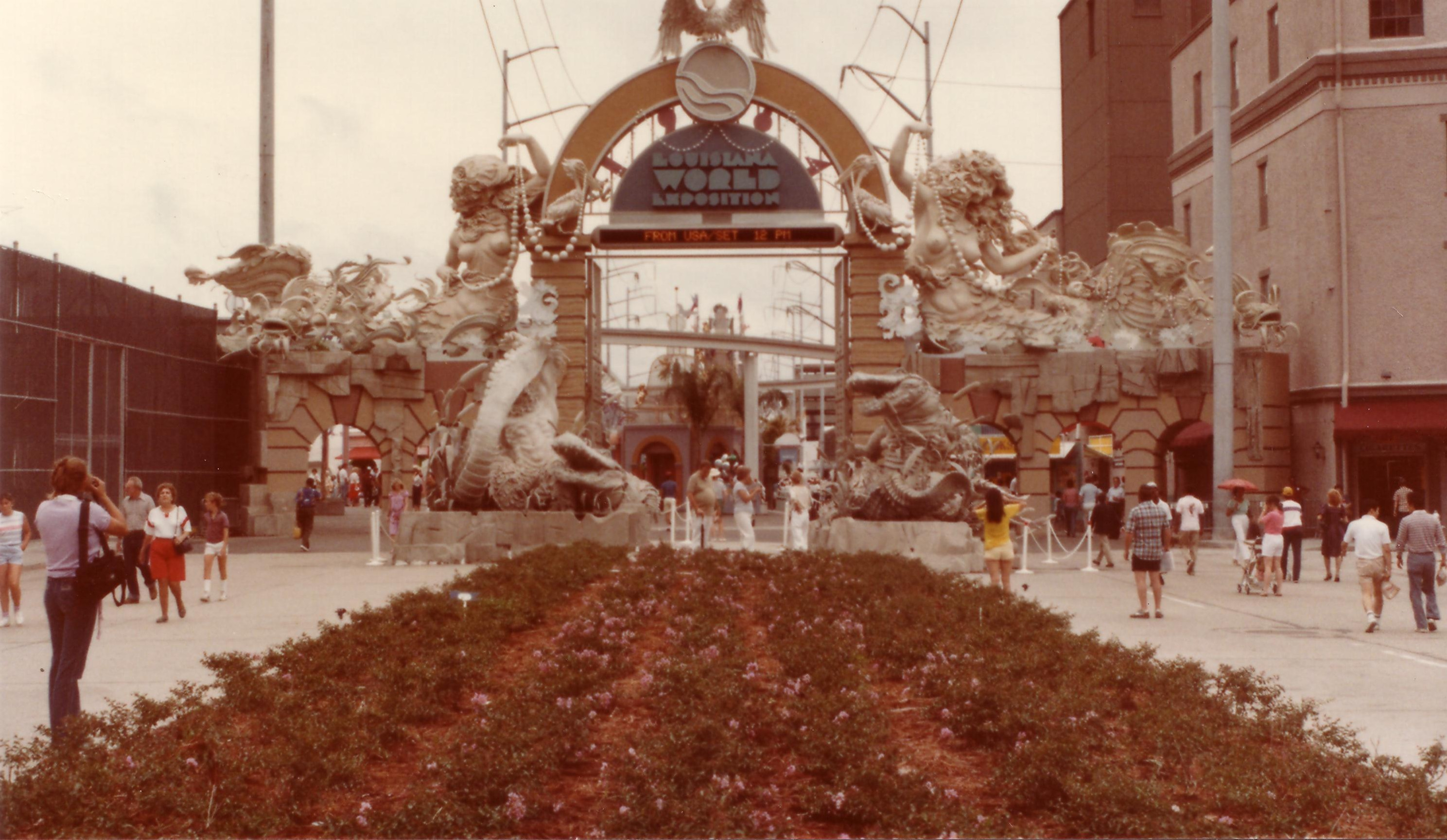
Main entrance

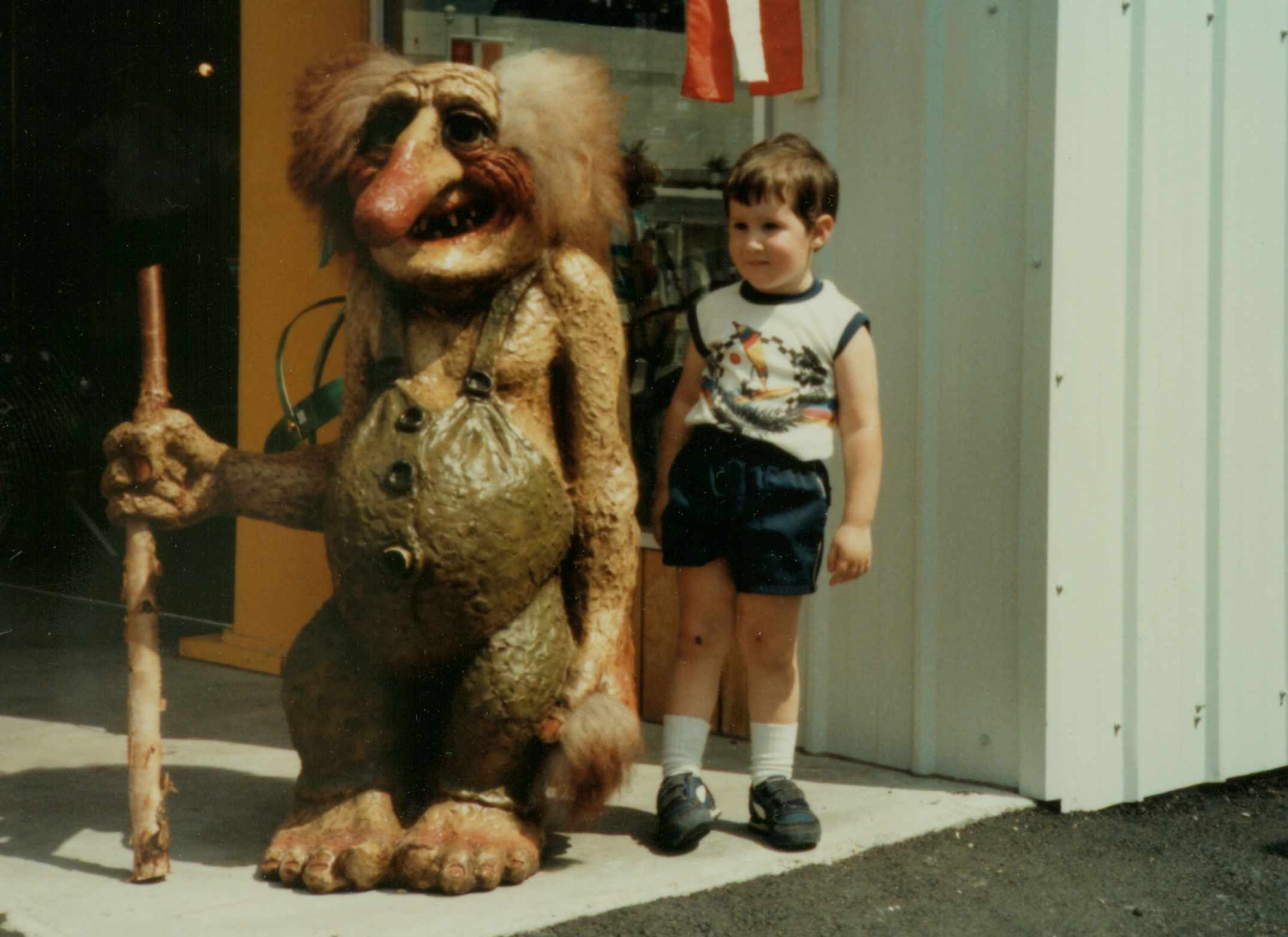
Worlds Fair New Orleans troll and child

== See also ==
- Mississippi Aerial River Transit
- List of world expositions
- List of world's fairs
