= List of Cajun restaurants =

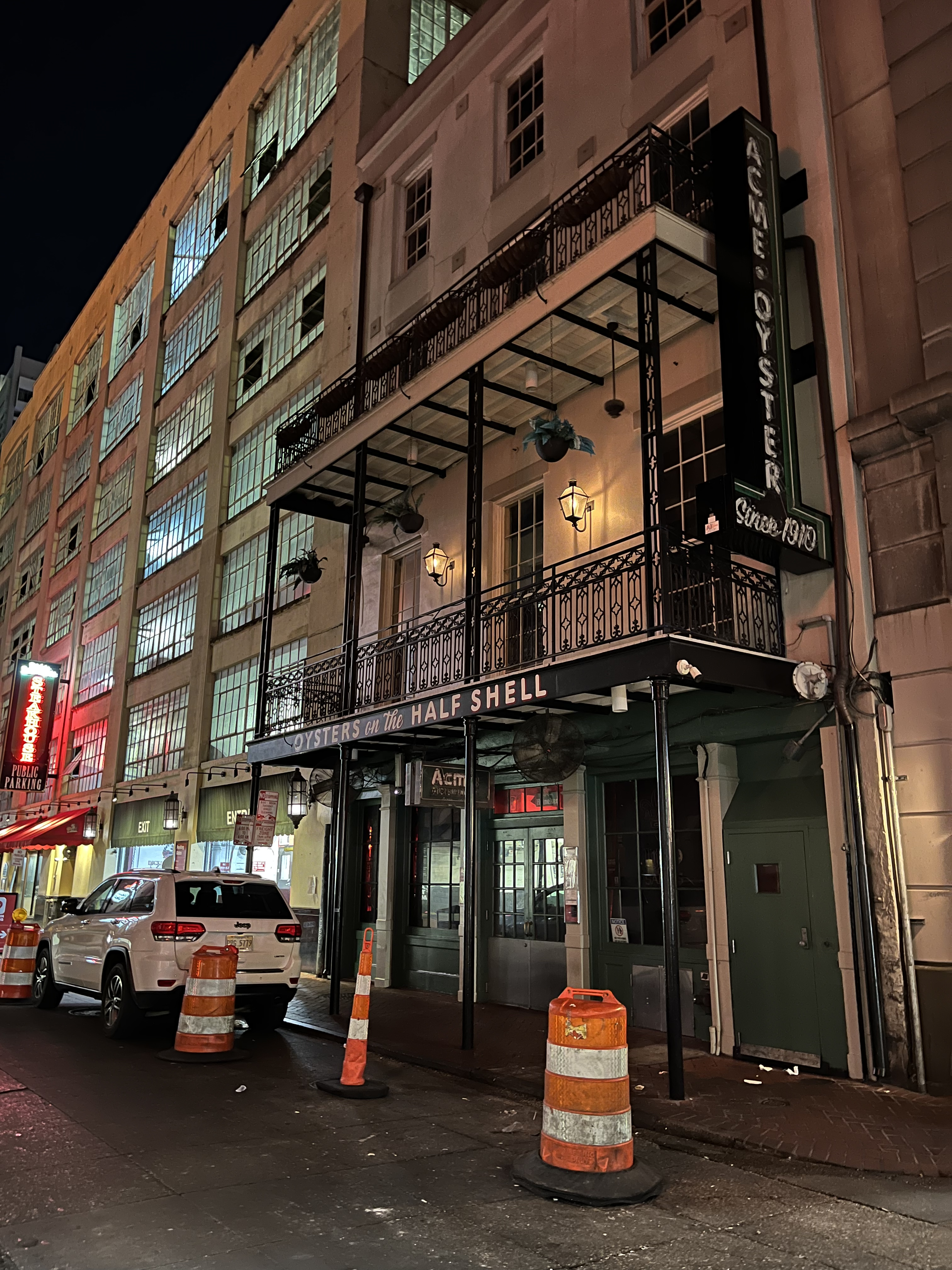
Acme Oyster House

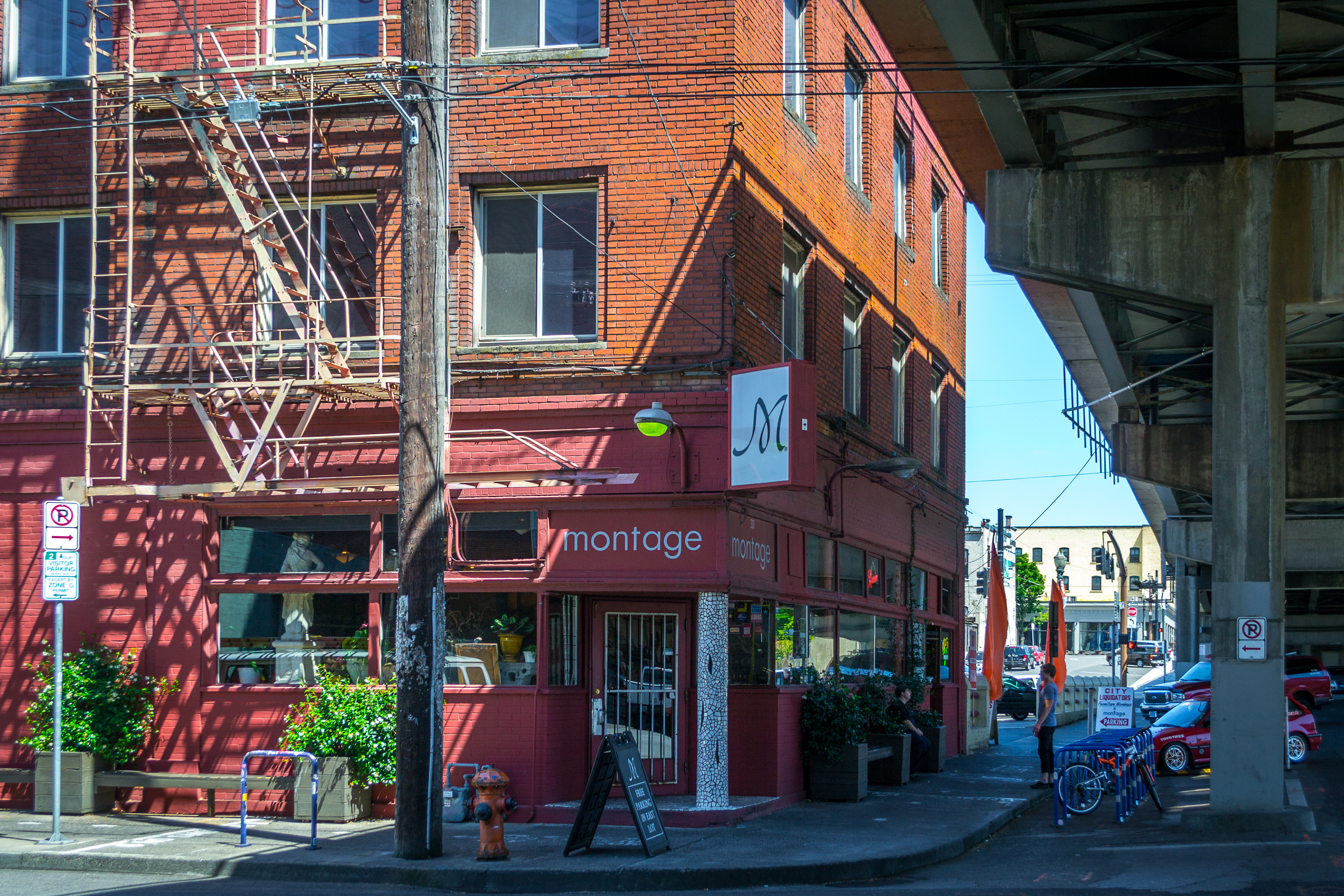
Le Bistro Montage, Portland, Oregon

Following is a list of Cajun restaurants:

- Acadia: A New Orleans Bistro, Portland, Oregon, U.S.
- Acme Oyster House
- Biscuit Bitch, Seattle, Washington, U.S.
- The Boiling Crab
- Cochon, New Orleans, Louisiana, U.S.
- Delta Cafe, Portland, Oregon
- Dirty Lettuce, Portland, Oregon
- Eat: An Oyster Bar, Portland, Oregon
- Everybody Eats PDX, Portland, Oregon
- Fat's Chicken and Waffles, Seattle
- K-Paul's Louisiana Kitchen, New Orleans
- The Kickin' Crab
- Le Bistro Montage, Portland, Oregon
- Lollipop Shoppe, Portland, Oregon
- Lucille's Smokehouse Bar-B-Que
- Miss Delta, Portland, Oregon
- Nacheaux, West Linn, Oregon (previously Portland, Oregon)
- The Parish, Portland, Oregon
- Tapalaya, Portland, Oregon
- Tiana's Palace
- Upperline Restaurant, New Orleans
