= Federico Visuetti =

Panamanian fashion designer

Federico Visuetti is a Panamanian fashion designer. He has designed fantasy costumes for the Panama Carnival as well as for the Miss Universe pageant. He has been designing for 35 years.

== Biography ==
Federico Visuetti started making clothes for himself in 1988; he was a Finance major in USMA (Universidad Santa Maria la Antigua) at the time. In 1990, he presented his fashion line during the "Panamá, Color y Moda" event. He finished his major in finance in 1994 and embarked to take classes in the United States of America in tailoring, technical perfection of drawing, painting, "look" and image.

In 1996, back in Panama, he worked as an adviser to "look" and image on the Board of the Panama Carnival. He was also responsible for the image of Sadie Vasquez, outgoing queen, and Jovana Muñoz a Rumba Carnival Queen of 1997. In 1999, he presented 40 outfits for the fashion pavilion at EXPOCOMER, an international commercial exhibition. He participated in important fashion events in Panama and abroad, including Fashion and Rumbo al Centenario Canal, Brides Sunset, Elite Model Look Panama, Panama Pasarela, Gala Miss Universe 2003, Panama Extravaganza 2005, among others. He was also invited by the Ecuadorian agency CN Models to represent Panama during the Ecuador Fashion Week 2003 and 2005.

== Inspiration ==
Federico Visuetti, makes two fashion collection a year. He designs for male and females in bold and sophisticated lines focusing on avant-garde design which have characterize his creations. Visuetti takes inspiration from the world's ethnic groups including Panama's, as well as aspects of the fauna and flora found in that country. He designs thinking about the folkloric aspect of Panama as well as the traditions. He also uses a blend of fine textiles and trends according to the climate of Panama, while also using a wide palette of colors.

== Personal life ==
Federico is currently single, traveling for work and vacations and he likes to share with his friends and family to enjoy the good things in life such as good food, music and dancing. He lives in Panama city. He has two brothers are Ileana and Erick. He loves to cook Italian, Spanish and Creole food. He had a dog named "Kimbo. Federico was born on December 27 with an undisclosed birth year and his sign is Capricorn. He practices swimming every day and loves to sunbathe on the beach. Currently has as a new pet a parrot named Murad.

== Awards and Recognitions ==
He received a nomination Latin Fashion Award in 2001 for Best Design (Avant-Garde), designer of the year and was elected by the Latin-American Vogue and Fashion TV Paris as one of the four Latin American avant-garde designers. Besides international awards he has received important awards for his contribution to fashion and culture in Panama, by the National Centennial Committee, from the Mayor of Panama, the Caesar Park Corporation and the Panamanian Institute of Tourism (IPAT). In 2006, he received an award at the Motorola Fashion Weekend in Playas, Ecuador.

In 2008 he received an award by the University of Panama in celebration of 20 years of success in the Latin fashion world and was elected godfather of fashion design in this university. He also received a recognition from the SEDAL Company. In 2013 he was invited to close the Ecuador Fashion Week and received recognition for his 25th anniversary in the fashion industry.

In 2014 he participated in the Capitol Fashion Award Gala Latin Fashion Week, Washington D.C. and received Award for the contribution in the Latin fashion industry. In 2016 he was invited to close Ecuador Fashion Week and received recognition for his career.

He participated in Fashion of the Americas 2016, Washington D.C. and received recognition for the contribution at the event. In February 2017 he was invited to participate in Fashion Night on Brickell Miami, Florida represented to Panama and received award and recognition by Panamanian American Chambers of Commerce for promoting Panama in the international fashion industry. In July 2017 he was invited to present the couture collection Panama Glam in Republica Dominicana Fashion Week.

Federico Visuetti was selected in 2018 by "Forbes Magazine" as one of the most influential fashion designer in Latin American and Central American region. In March 2018 he participated in Men's Fashion Week Miami, Florida and was special guest and judge for Mr. Model International 2018. In September 2018 he was invited to open the first edition of Arte, Diseño & Moda Latinoamericana in Buenos Aires, Argentina. In November 2019 he was invited to close the launch event of CAMIL (Cámara de Arte, Moda Industria Latinoamericana) in Buenos Aires, Argentina and was named vice president of CAMIL.

In Sept 2020 presented his couture collection virtual way title "Panama Chic" representing the Ministry of Culture and Ministry Foreign Relations PROPANAMA, in the Panama Fashion Week.

For July 2023 VISUETTI presented "RETROSPECTIVE" celebrating its 35th anniversary in the fashion industry, with a great gala organized by Luxury Diviners Day, ProPanama and Hilton Hotel where it received an important recognition for its trajectory and contributions to fashion and culture in Panama.

Then in Sept, he traveled to Buenos Aires, Argentina to participate in "Latinoamerica te Viste", presenting his collection "Sangre de Toro" where received lifetime achievement award endorsed by the United Nations Promotion Fund.

Afterwards he traveled as a star designer to make the official closing of the 20th Anniversary of "Ecuador Fashion Week 2023" where he was awarded th Clio Fashion Award by the organization.

For January 2024 he present his collection at Selecta Moda Panama. In April he will perform what would be the first fashion event organized by Luxury Diviners Day at the City of the Arts in Panama. In May he traveled to Cartagena, Colombia as a star guest for the previous CostaModa project and as an international jury of the Mister Model International 2024.

Visit: www.visuetti.com
