= Miss Delta =

Restaurant in Portland, Oregon, U.S.

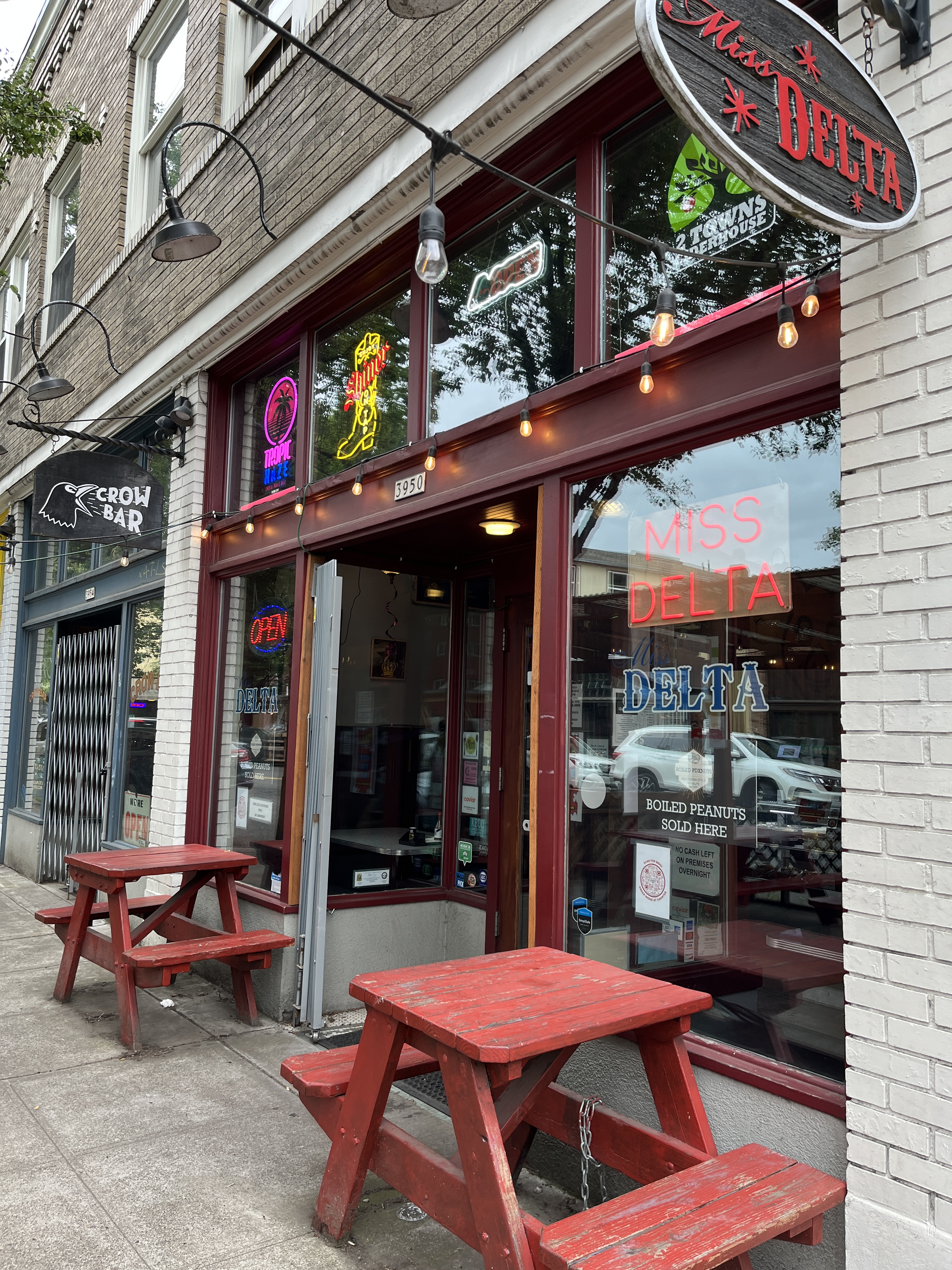
- The restaurant's exterior, 2025
- Interactive map of Miss Delta

Restaurant information
- Established: 2007
- Owner: Marcus Oliver
- Previous owners: Anastasia Corya; Anton Pace
- Food type: Cajun; Creole; Southern
- Location: 3950 North Mississippi Avenue, Portland, Oregon, 97227, United States
- Coordinates: 45°33′5.9″N 122°40′31.1″W
- Website: missdeltapdx.net

Miss Delta was a Southern restaurant in Portland, Oregon, United States. Anastasia Corya and Anton Pace opened the restaurant in 2007, and later sold the business to Marcus Oliver, who expanded the Cajun and Creole-menu to include barbecue. Miss Delta closed permanently in July 2026.

== Description ==
The Southern restaurant Miss Delta, located in the north Portland part of the Boise neighborhood, served brunch, lunch, and dinner. According to John Chandler of Portland Monthly, the restaurant was "the slightly-less-thrift-store-funky offspring of the original Delta Cafe on SE Woodstock, a joint that earned its rep by dropping huge platters of Southern cooking on its customers for embarrassingly small sums of money". The Portland Mercury's Alison Hallett described Miss Delta as a "well-designed little space" with wood floors, exposed brick walls, and "quirky" light fixtures "that suffuse the place with a bourbon-y hue create an atmosphere redolent with both Southern gentility and North Portland chic".

The Cajun and Creole-influenced menu included soul food such as barbecue, biscuits and gravy, catfish sandwiches, cauliflower casserole, chicken and waffles, cornbread muffins, fried okra, hushpuppies, gumbo, and po'boys. The Trashy Mac was macaroni and cheese with smoked chicken and pesto, jambalaya, or gumbo. The Meat Sweats was a platter of andouille, brisket, blackened chicken, pulled pork, and spare ribs. Sides included coleslaw, collards, mashed potatoes with chicken sausage gravy, and red beans and rice. The dessert menu included marionberry cobbler, sweet potato pie, and Milky Way cake (dark chocolate cake with chunks of Milky Way candy and caramel).

== History ==
Anastasia Corya and Anton Pace, who previously opened the Delta Cafe in 1995, opened Miss Delta in August 2007. Previously, the space had housed Pasta Bangs. Marcus Oliver later became the owner. He purchased the restaurant and expanded the mostly Cajun/Creole menu to include barbecue.

In 2013, Michael Russell of The Oregonian called Miss Delta a "one-time spinoff of ... cult favorite Delta Cafe" and said the restaurant "has seemed to change hands more times than the Mississippi River has tributaries". Like many restaurants, the business experienced difficulties during the COVID-19 pandemic, including staffing issues and temporary closures. In 2021, Oliver's book Cool and Kooky Kids Coloring Cookbook was sold at the restaurant. The business participated in Portland's first Fried Chicken Week in 2025. In June 2026, Miss Delta confirmed plans to close permanently on July 3.

== Reception ==
In his 2007 review of Miss Delta, Tim LaBarge of The Oregonian wrote, "Don't let the lighthearted interior fool you: Miss Delta is a place for serious eating and Southern comfort." The newspaper's Grant Butler called the fried chicken "stellar" and said the "sides are good across the board". In 2008, Butler said the restaurant "captures the essence of Southern cooking in all its cast-iron glory. Whether it's perfect black-eyed pea fritters or spicy jambalaya with hot sausage, smoked chicken and shrimp, dishes have a calories-be-damned approach. Portions are so large they have their own gravitational pull: The thing separating comfort from extreme discomfort is your own self-control."

Miss Delta won in the Best Soul Food category of Willamette Week's annual 'Best of Portland' readers' poll ion 2024. It placed second in the same category in 2025.

== See also ==
- List of Cajun restaurants
- List of defunct restaurants of the United States
- List of soul food restaurants
- List of Southern restaurants
