= Biscuit Bitch =

Restaurant chain in Seattle, Washington, U.S.

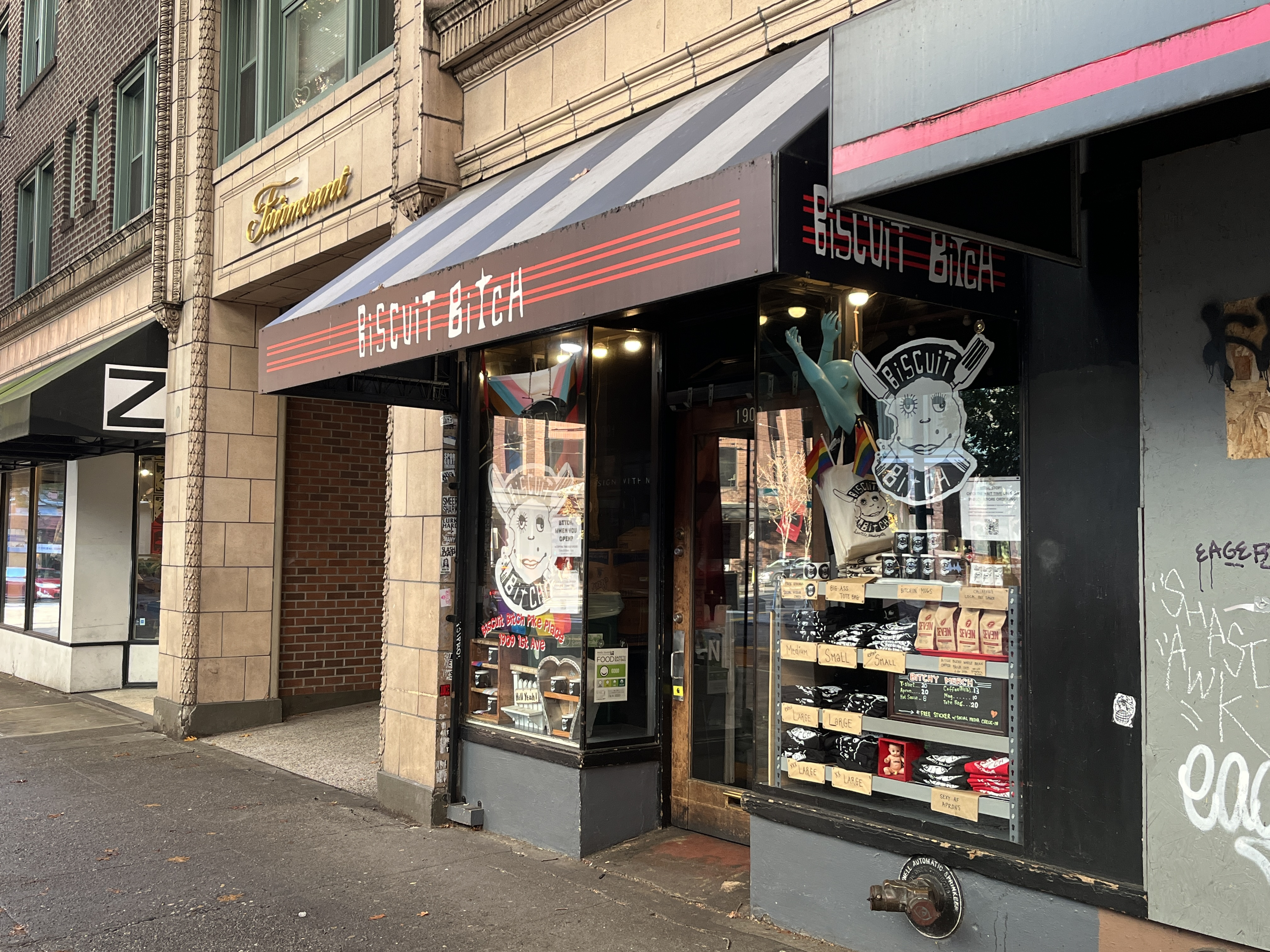
- Restaurant exterior, 2022

Restaurant information
- Owner: Kimmie Spice
- Food type: Cajun; Creole; Southern
- Location: Seattle, Washington, United States
- Website: biscuitbitch.square.site

Biscuit Bitch is a small chain of restaurants in the Seattle metropolitan area, in the U.S. state of Washington. The business operates in Belltown and at Pike Place Market. Previously, Biscuit Bitch had locations in Pioneer Square and White Center, which closed in 2020 during the COVID-19 pandemic.

== Description ==
Seattle Metropolitan has said of the Cajun/Creole/Southern restaurant: "Equipped with cheddar-topped hangover cures, this self-described 'trailer park to table' cafe serves up gravy-drenched biscuits with southern-inspired fixings: garlic grits, hot links, pork sausage, and more."

== History ==
The business is owned by Kimmie Spice. The White Center location opened in 2019. Lizzo visited the First Avenue location in 2019.

== Reception ==
Allecia Vermillion included the business in Seattle Metropolitan's 2022 list of "the best biscuits in Seattle".

== See also ==
- List of Cajun restaurants
- List of restaurant chains in the United States
- List of restaurants in Pike Place Market
- List of Southern restaurants
