= Upperline =

Upperline may refer to various places in the city of New Orleans, Louisiana, United States:

- 17th Street Canal, also known as the Upperline Canal
- Upperline Restaurant
- Upperline Street
