= Dirty Lettuce =

Vegan restaurant in Portland, Oregon, U.S.

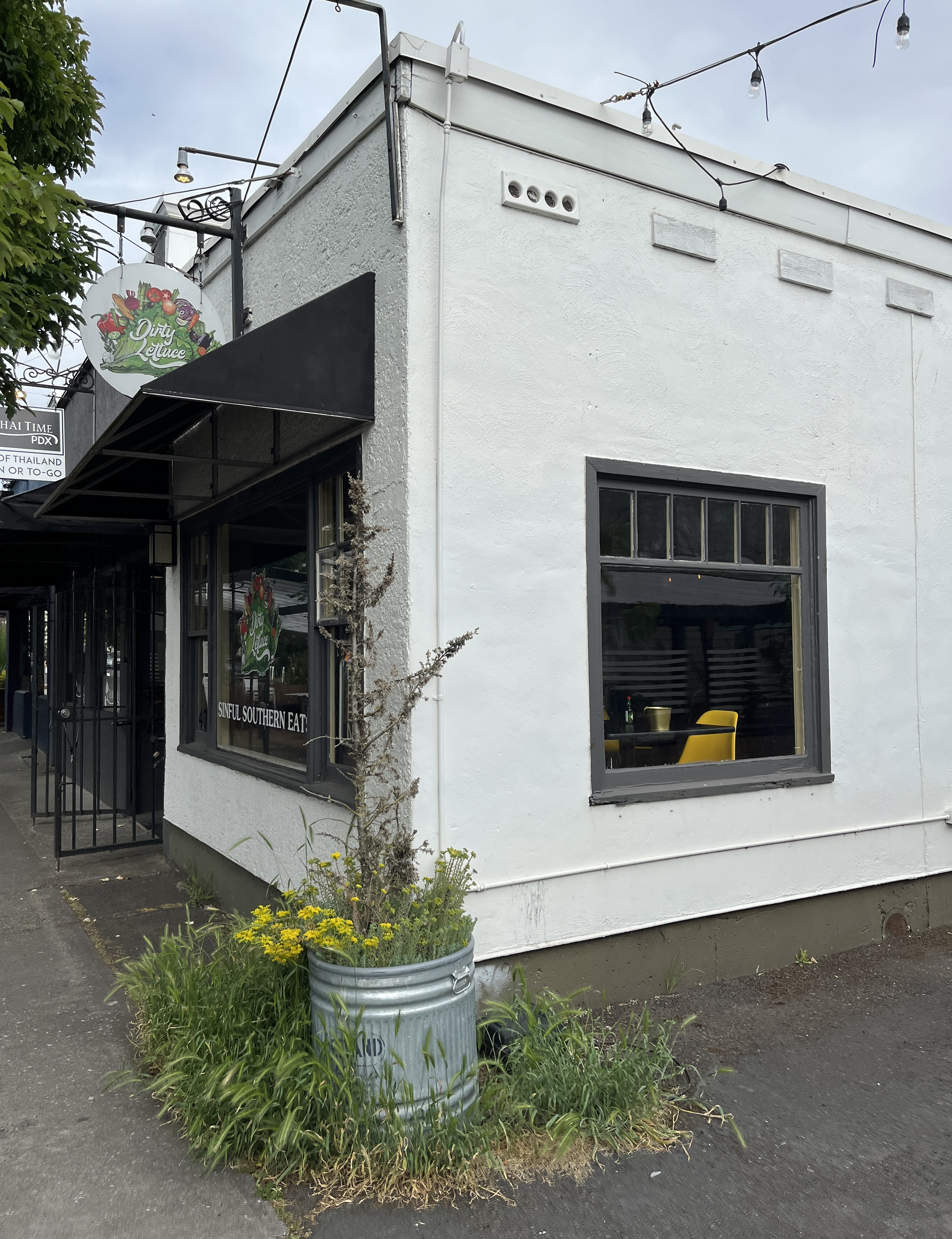
- The restaurant's exterior in 2025
- Interactive map of Dirty Lettuce

Restaurant information
- Established: 2020
- Owner: Alkebulan Moroski
- Food type: Cajun; Creole; soul food; Southern; vegan
- Location: 4727 Northeast Fremont Street, Portland, Multnomah, Oregon, 97213, United States
- Coordinates: 45.5484°N 122.6144°W
- Website: dirtylettuce.square.site

Dirty Lettuce is a Black-owned vegan restaurant serving Southern, Cajun, and Creole cuisine in Portland, Oregon. Alkebulan Moroski began operating as a food cart in 2020 and opened a brick and mortar restaurant in 2021.

== Description ==
Dirty Lettuce serves vegan Southern, Cajun, and Creole cuisine, including soul food and plant-based "meats" such as seitan barbecue ribs and Ota tofu fried "chicken". Sides include fried okra, jambalaya, macaroni and cheese, sour cream and onion mashed potatoes, Southern-style leaf vegetables, a Nachitoches meat pie, bowls similar to KFC's Famous Bowl, shrimp-and-grit fritters, candied yams, and corn muffins.

== History ==
With assistance from his mother Kim, Alkebulan Moroski began operating Dirty Lettuce as a food cart in northeast Portland's Shady Pines pod (5240 Northeast 42nd Avenue) in early 2020. He opened a brick and mortar restaurant on Northeast Fremont in the Cully neighborhood (at the Rose City Park border) in May 2021, and planned to continue operating the food cart as of March. However, Shady Pines closed in late 2021.

== Reception ==
According to The Oregonian's Michael Russell, Dirty Lettuce was among the "new generation" of vegan restaurants which saw a "pandemic-era explosion". He called the restaurant a "rising star" of Shady Pines. Similarly, Willamette Week's Shannon Gormley called Dirty Lettuce the "biggest breakout success" of Shady Pines, Portland's only vegan food pod until closing. She also described restaurant as one of several local "breakout" vegan establishments opened in 2020. Dirty Lettuce was a runner-up in the Best Soul Food category of Willamette Week's annual 'Best of Portland' readers' poll in 2024. It won in the same category in 2025.

Waz Wu included Dirty Lettuce in Eater Portland's 2021 lists of the city's fifteen "essential" vegan and vegetarian restaurants and thirteen vegan food carts in the metropolitan area. The website's Ron Scott and Nathan Williams included the restaurant in a 2022 list of thirteen restaurants for "serious" soul in the Portland metropolitan area. Brenna Houck included Dirty Lettuce in a 2025 list of Portland's eighteen best vegan and vegetarian restaurants.

== See also ==
- List of Black-owned restaurants
- List of Cajun restaurants
- List of soul food restaurants
- List of Southern restaurants
- List of vegetarian and vegan restaurants
