= Everybody Eats PDX =

Defunct restaurant in Portland, Oregon, US

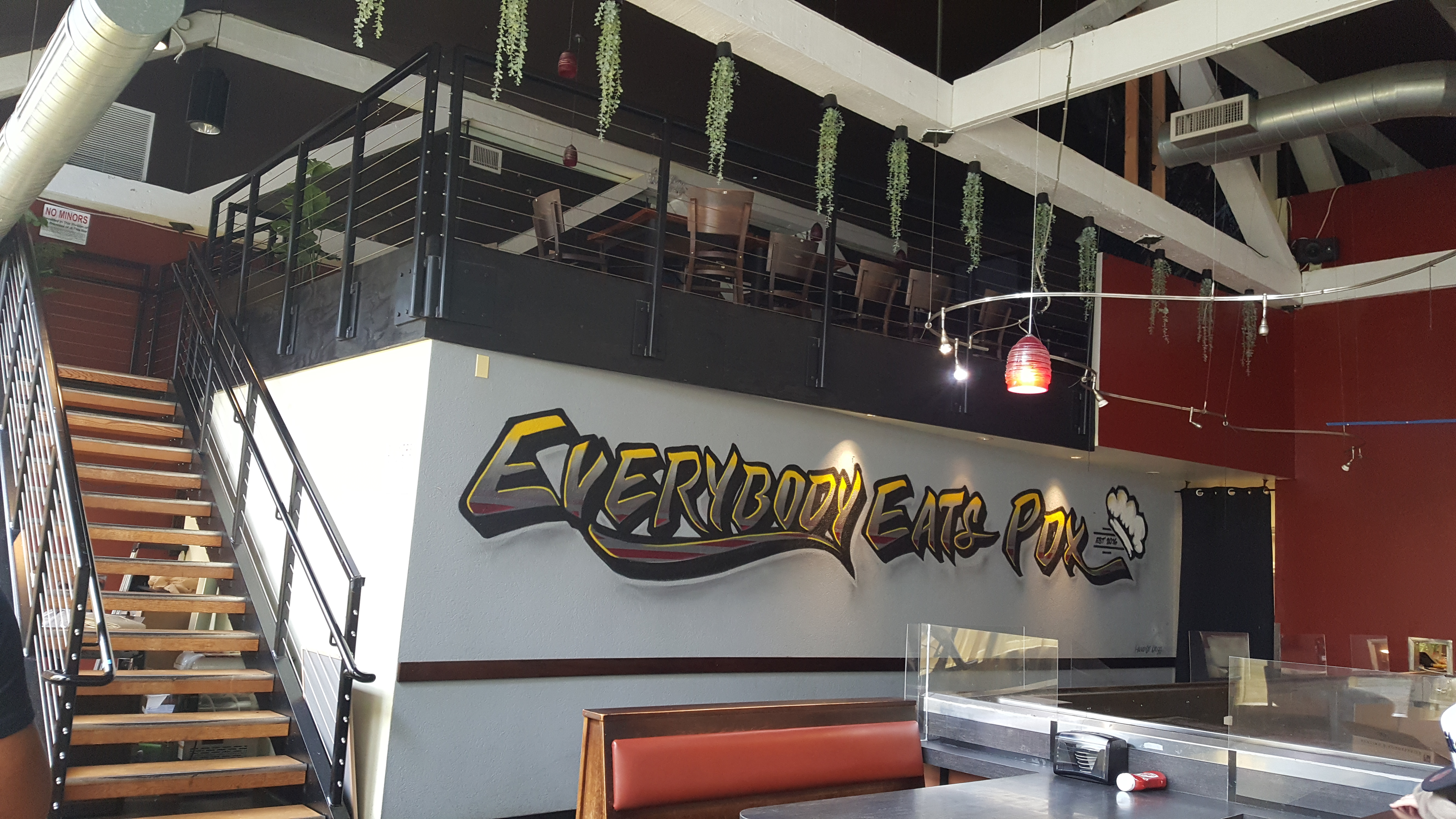
- The restaurant's interior, 2022
- Interactive map of Everybody Eats PDX

Restaurant information
- Closed: 2022
- Food type: Soul food; Cajun; Creole
- Location: Portland, Oregon, United States
- Coordinates: 45.5243°N 122.6810°W

Everybody Eats PDX (sometimes simply Everybody Eats) was a soul food restaurant in Portland, Oregon. The business closed in 2022.

== Description ==
Everybody Eats PDX was a Black-owned, soul food restaurant that served Cajun and Creole cuisine in northwest Portland's Pearl District. Portland Monthly's Katherine Chew Hamilton described the menu as "Southern-meets-Pacific-Northwest cooking".

The brunch menu included chicken and waffles (including a peach cobbler variety) and shrimp and grits. The dinner menu included lamb chops with Cajun pasta, mashed potatoes, and asparagus as sides. The "ultimate" seafood macaroni and cheese had crab, lobster, and shrimp mixed with Tillamook cheese sauce, topped with lobster tail, king crab meat, prawns, and a Mexican cheese blend.

The interior featured a graffiti mural painted by Ray Baxter, also known as Hand of Dogg.

== History ==
Owners Johnny Huff Jr. and Marcell Goss started Everybody Eats as a catering service in 2016. In May 2020, during the COVID-19 pandemic, the business moved into a brick and mortar in southeast Portland, operating via catering, counter service and takeout. The menu included cheesesteaks, macaroni and cheese, and po'boys.

The restaurant relocated to the Pearl District in May 2021, offering brunch, lunch, dinner, and a full bar. In September 2021, three people were injured after a gunfight broke out amongst a group of diners. The restaurant was vandalized in May 2022, as part of a five-day crime spree targeting Black-owned restaurants as well as mosques and synagogues; the man who broke a window at the restaurant was sentenced to five years in prison for the incidents in 2025.

The restaurant's owners supported community organizations including Black Lives Matter and Don't Shoot PDX. Everybody Eats PDX closed in 2022.

== Reception ==
Kara Stokes and Maya MacEvoy included Everybody Eats PDX in Eater Portland's 2022 overview of recommended restaurants in the Pearl District. The website's Ron Scott and Nathan Williams included the restaurant in a 2022 list of thirteen "spots for serious soul food" in the Portland metropolitan area.

== See also ==
- List of Black-owned restaurants
- List of Cajun restaurants
- List of defunct restaurants of the United States
- List of soul food restaurants
