= TKC =

TKC may refer to:

- The Kennel Club
- The Kickin' Crab
- The King's College (New York)
- The King's Consort
- Tonnerre Yaoundé (Tonnerre Kalara Club), a sports club in Cameroon
- The Köln Concert, a 1975 jazz recording by Keith Jarrett
- Turkcell
