= Eat: An Oyster Bar =

Restaurant in Portland, Oregon, U.S.

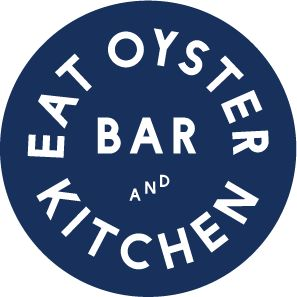

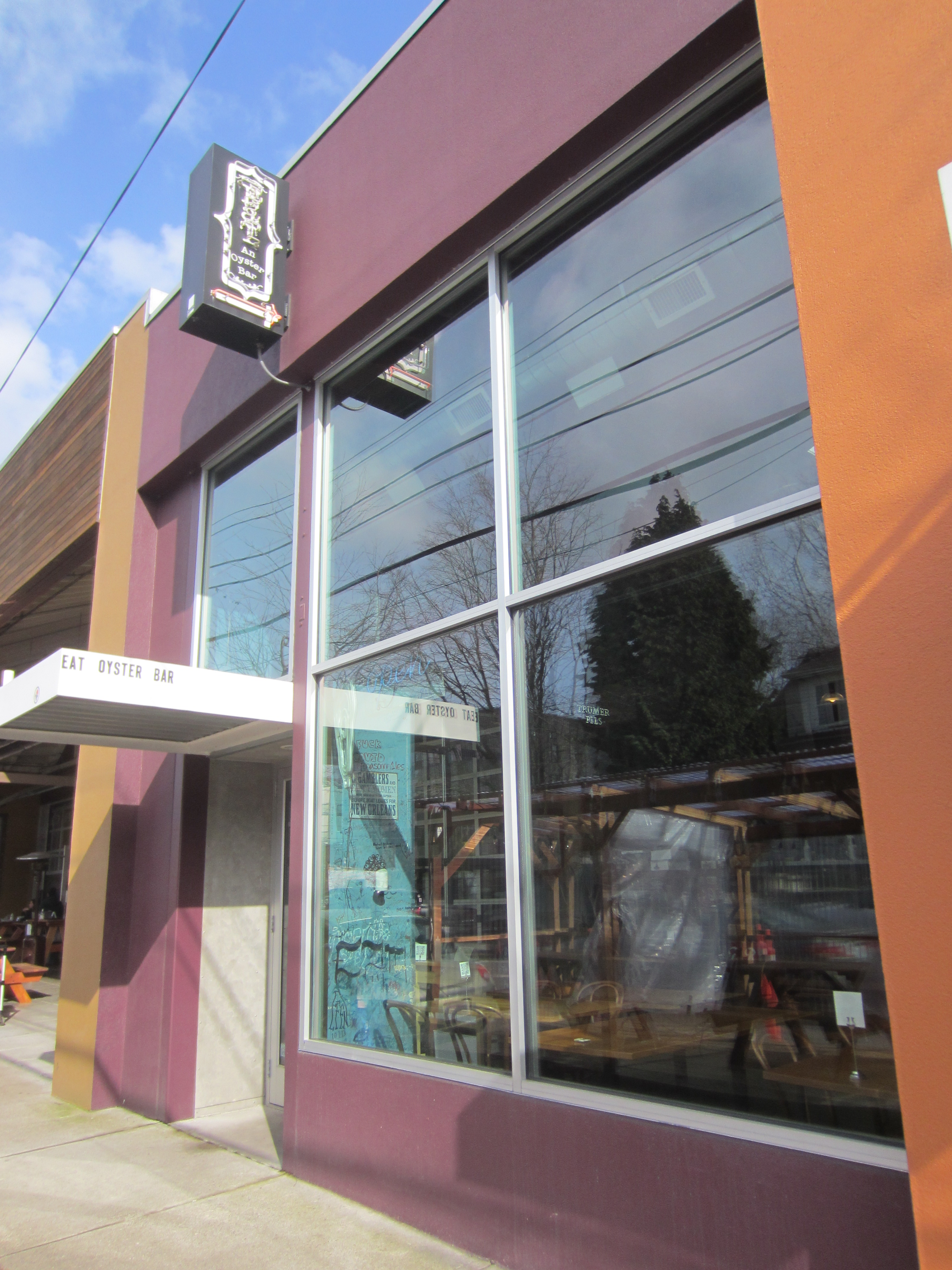
- The restaurant's exterior, 2021
- Interactive map of Eat: An Oyster Bar

Restaurant information
- Established: 2008
- Owners: Tobias Hogan; Ethan Powell
- Food type: Cajun; Louisiana Creole; seafood
- Location: 3808 North Williams Avenue, Portland, Multnomah, Oregon, 97227, United States
- Coordinates: 45.5502°N 122.6664°W
- Website: eatoysterbar.com

Eat: An Oyster Bar is a Cajun and Louisiana Creole restaurant in Portland, Oregon.

== Description ==
Eat is a Cajun and Louisiana Creole restaurant on North Williams Avenue in the northeast Portland part of the Boise neighborhood. Chad Walsh of Eater Portland has described the oyster bar as a "Louisiana-inspired stalwart". The website's Krista Garcia said the menu "nods to New Orleans, and is a bonanza for everything bivalve: baked oysters, fried oysters (a la carte or stuffed into po boys), oyster shooters, and of course, oysters on the half shell, served with classic grated horseradish and mignonette". The menu has also included blackened catfish, fried okra, frog legs, and shrimp etouffée. The restaurant has offered a $1 oyster happy hour, and supplies oysters to many other local restaurants. Eat offered 15 varieties of West Coast oysters, including Puget Sound-sourced Chelsea Gems and Hammersleys, as of 2018.

== History ==
Owners Tobias Hogan and Ethan Powell opened Eat, once considered a sibling to The Parish, in 2008. Eat has hosted an annual Cajun gumbo cook-off.

== Reception ==
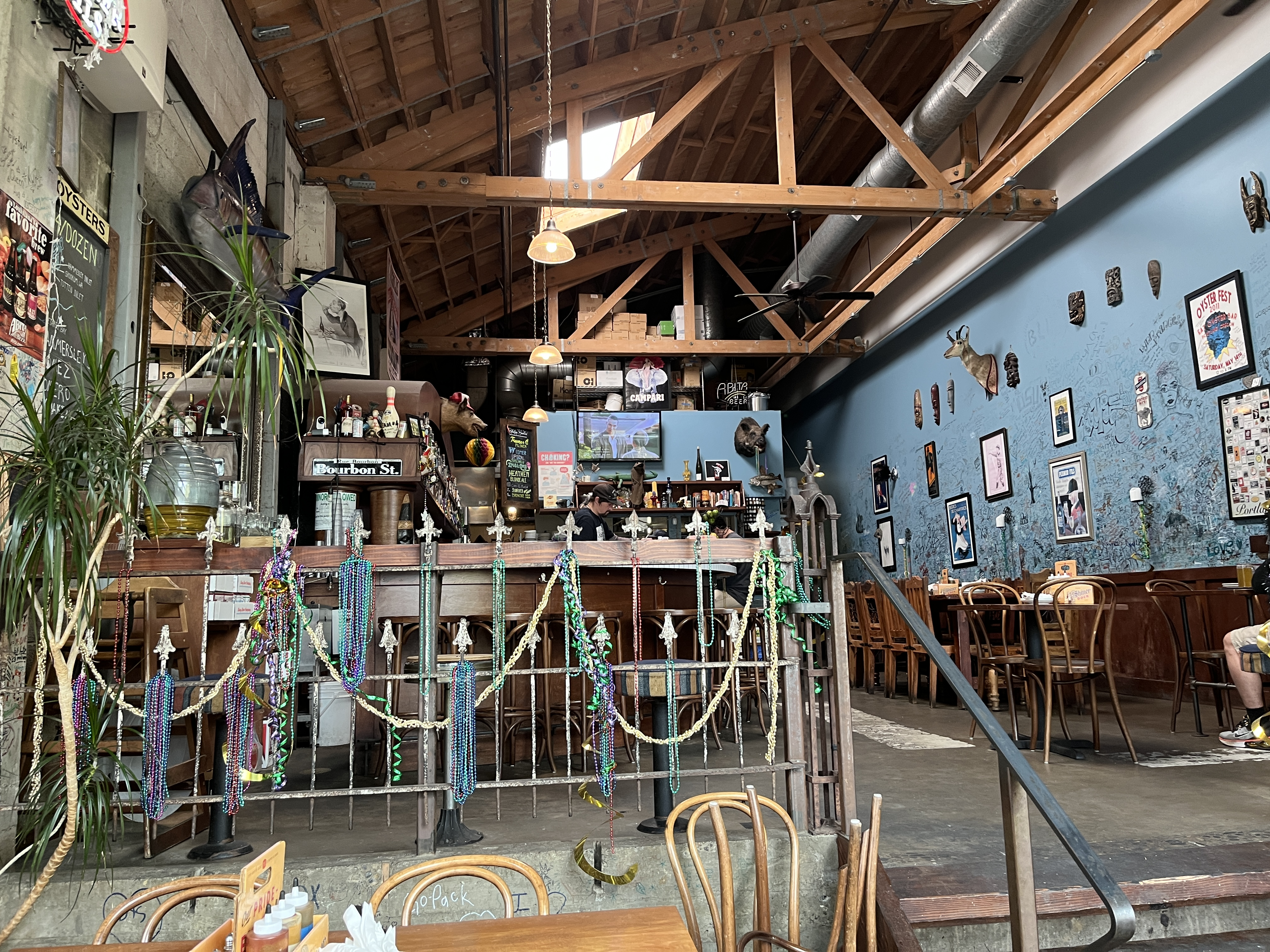
The restaurant's interior, 2022

Douglas Perry of The Oregonian gave the restaurant a 'B' rating in 2009. Michael Russell included Eat in The Oregonian's 2016 list of Portland's 12 best oyster bars. He recommended, "Don't go expecting speedy service or flawless bivalves at this split-level Cajun/Creole restaurant. Do go on Tuesdays, when select oysters are $2 a pop." Willamette Week included Eat in a 2016 list of "Where to Get the Best Happy Hour Oysters in Portland" and said the restaurant "has some of the freshest bivalves in town from mostly Oregon sources". Staff writers also included the restaurant in a 2016 overview of "the best seafood spots" in the city.

Thrillist included Eat in a 2018 list of "The 21 Best Oyster Bars in the Country". The website said, "There's no pomp and circumstance at this dirty south-influenced fixture of a fast-changing stretch of the hip Williams restaurant district, but you might notice some familiar faces eyeballing the oyster board: The place supplies farm-fresh bivalves to many of Portland's fancier joints. But those joints don't have tiny ½ pints of beer. Or frog legs. Or whatever the hell's smoking outside on the perpetually running smoker, which often wafts in to accompany live blues bands. Grab a set of shooters and a tiny beer and let the shuckers go to work."

Eater Portland included Eat in a 2017 list of "18 Hidden Gem Restaurants in Portland". Jenni Moore and Nathan Williams included the restaurant in the website's 2022 overview of "Where to Find Stellar Seafood in Portland".

== See also ==
- List of Cajun restaurants
- List of Louisiana Creole restaurants
- List of oyster bars
- List of seafood restaurants
