= Delta Cafe =

Restaurant in Portland, Oregon, U.S.

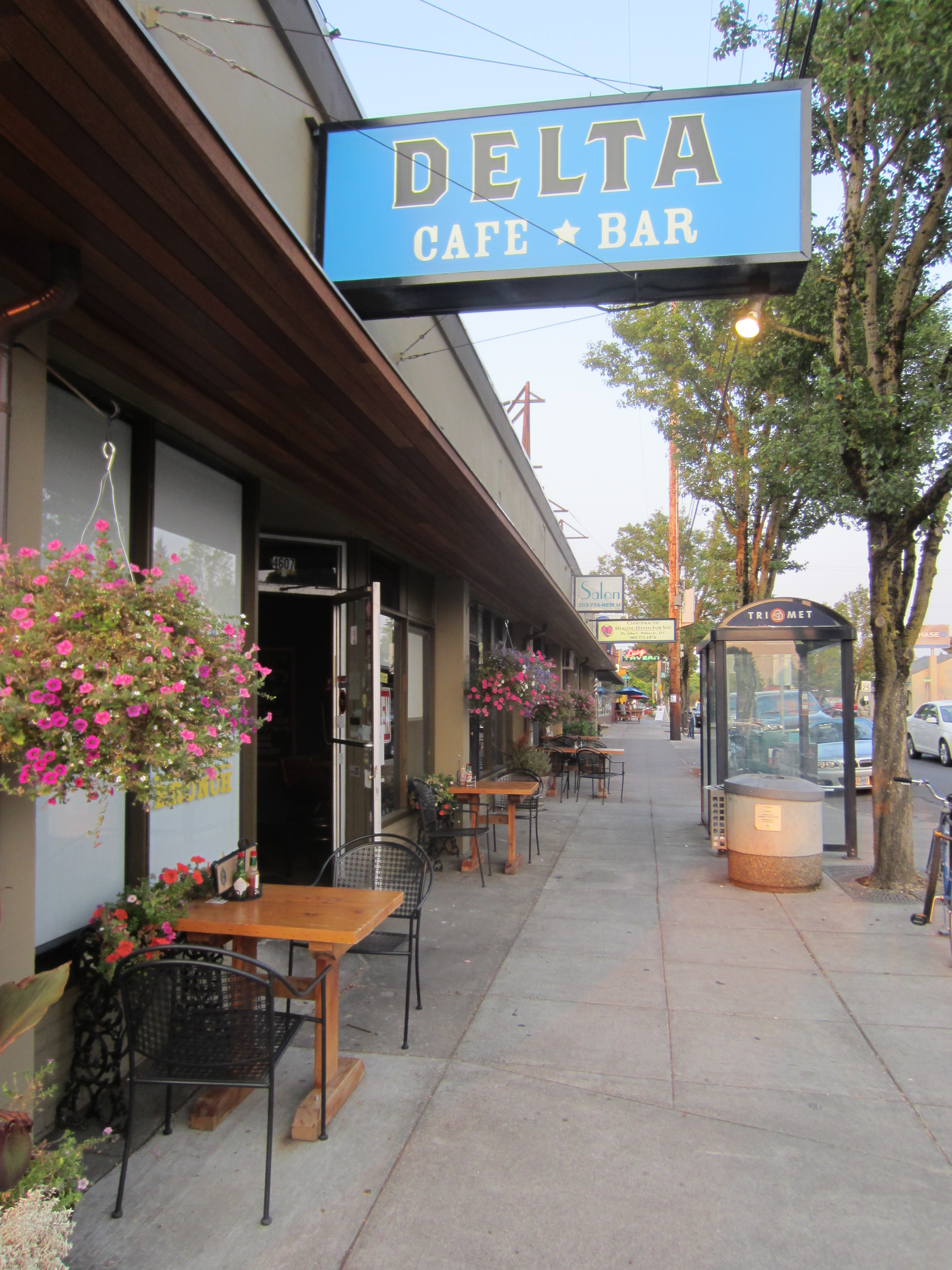
- The restaurant's exterior in 2012
- Interactive map of Delta Cafe

Restaurant information
- Established: 1995 (31 years ago)
- Previous owners: Anastasia Corya; Anton Pace
- Food type: Southern; cajun; soul food
- Location: 4607 SE Woodstock Blvd., Portland, Multnomah, Oregon, 97206, United States
- Coordinates: 45.4793°N 122.6153°W
- Website: deltacafepdx.com

Delta Cafe is a Southern, cajun, and soul food restaurant in the Woodstock neighborhood of Portland, Oregon, United States. Anastasia Corya and Anton Pace opened the restaurant in 1995. They sold Delta in 2007 to open another Southern restaurant, Miss Delta, with two of the cafe's cooks. Frequented by Reed College students and neighborhood residents, Delta Cafe has been recognized as a favorite local comfort food destination. The cafe also has a cocktail bar called Delta Lounge. In 2016, a mural was painted on the restaurant's exterior as part of a neighborhood beautification project.

== Description ==
Delta Cafe is located on Woodstock Boulevard in southeast Portland's Woodstock neighborhood. Delta has been described as an "inexpensive neighborhood place" serving "generous" portions to Reed College students and having "a loyal following from all over". It originally had a single dining space and later expanded that to four. The restaurant plays "funky" music and has "odd" furniture and local art. It is open daily for a 9 am brunch, and from 5 to 10 pm for dinner, with the bar staying open later. As of 2011, the restaurant accepts cash and checks only.

The restaurant serves Southern, Cajun, and soul food. The menu includes fried chicken, fritters, hushpuppies, meatloaf, and ribs. Other options include fried versions of gizzards, okra, oysters, pickles, and shrimp. Since 2016, brunch has been served daily starting at 9 am. The brunch menu includes beignets, shrimp and grits, and smoked brisket hash.

The bar, the Delta Lounge, stays open until 1 am on weekdays and 2 am on weekends. Drinks on Delta Lounge's menu include the Hey Ya!!!, a cucumber vodka cocktail; and a ginger drop made from ginger-infused vodka blended with lemon; as well as Bloody Marys and other cocktails that are also served with brunch.

== History ==
Anastasia Corya and Anton Pace established Delta Cafe in 1995. Early on, Delta had a "symbiotic bar-restaurant relationship" with nearby Lutz Tavern, where guests on the waiting list for restaurant seating could wait at the bar. Before cell phones, Lutz staff would receive calls from Delta and announce when parties could be seated.

Corya and Pace sold the business in June 2007, then opened Miss Delta on Mississippi Avenue in north Portland in August 2007. Two of Delta Cafe's cooks, Jennifer Hazzard and Chuck Westmoreland, also became co-owners of Miss Delta and continued serving Southern cuisine. In 2012, Delta celebrated its seventeenth anniversary by offering forty-ounce Pabsts to patrons for $2.50, the price of the drink when the restaurant was founded.

In 2016, a mural was painted on the restaurant's west exterior as part of a neighborhood beautification initiative called the Woodstock Street Art Project. Funded in part by Metro and the Regional Arts & Culture Council, this and two other murals in the neighborhood were completed by Travis Czekalski and Jon Stommel, the art duo known as Rather Severe.

Delta began serving brunch daily in November 2016. The restaurant has also hosted Halloween and Mardi Gras celebrations.

== Reception ==
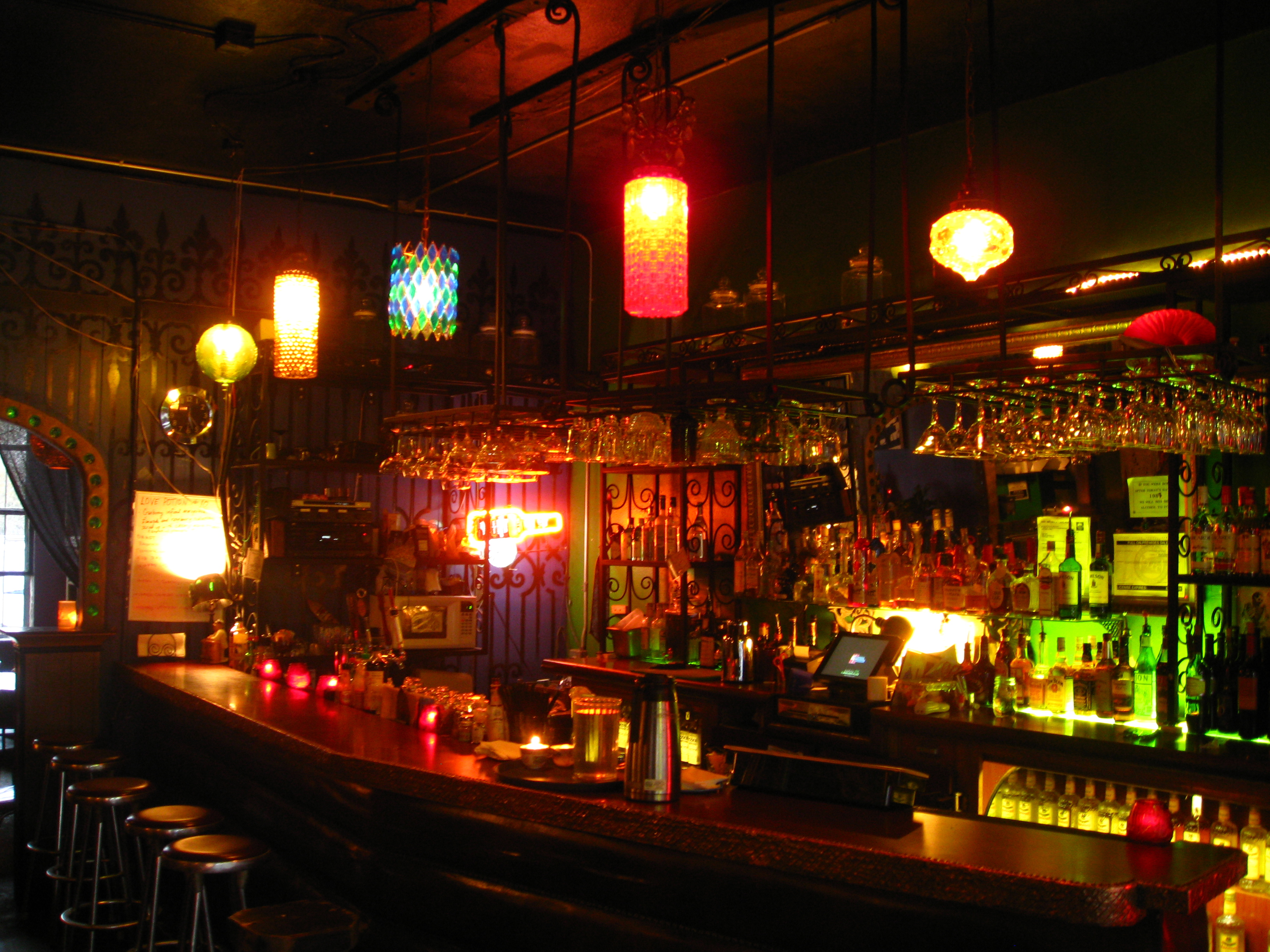
Delta Lounge, 2008

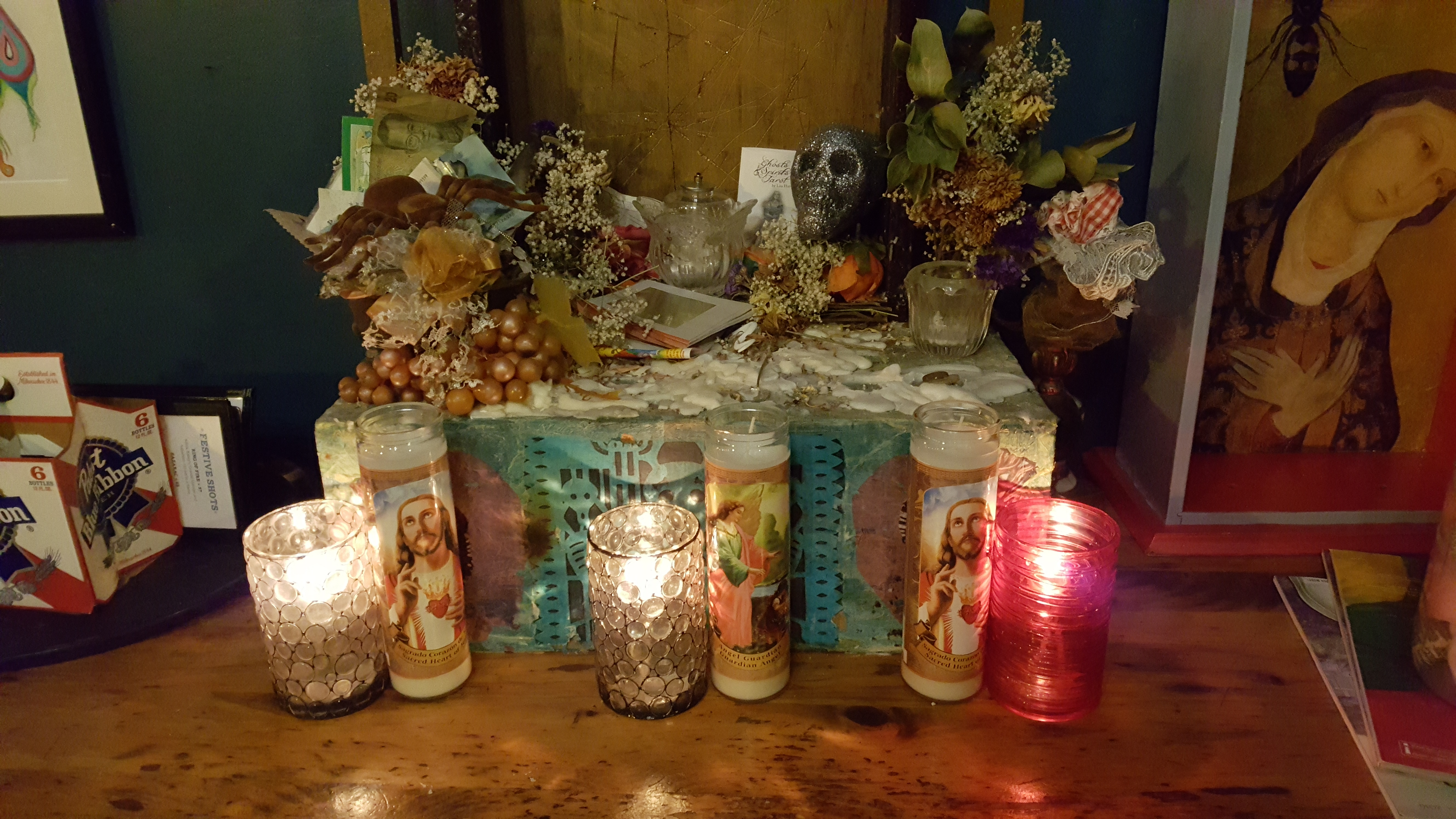
Interior decor, 2016

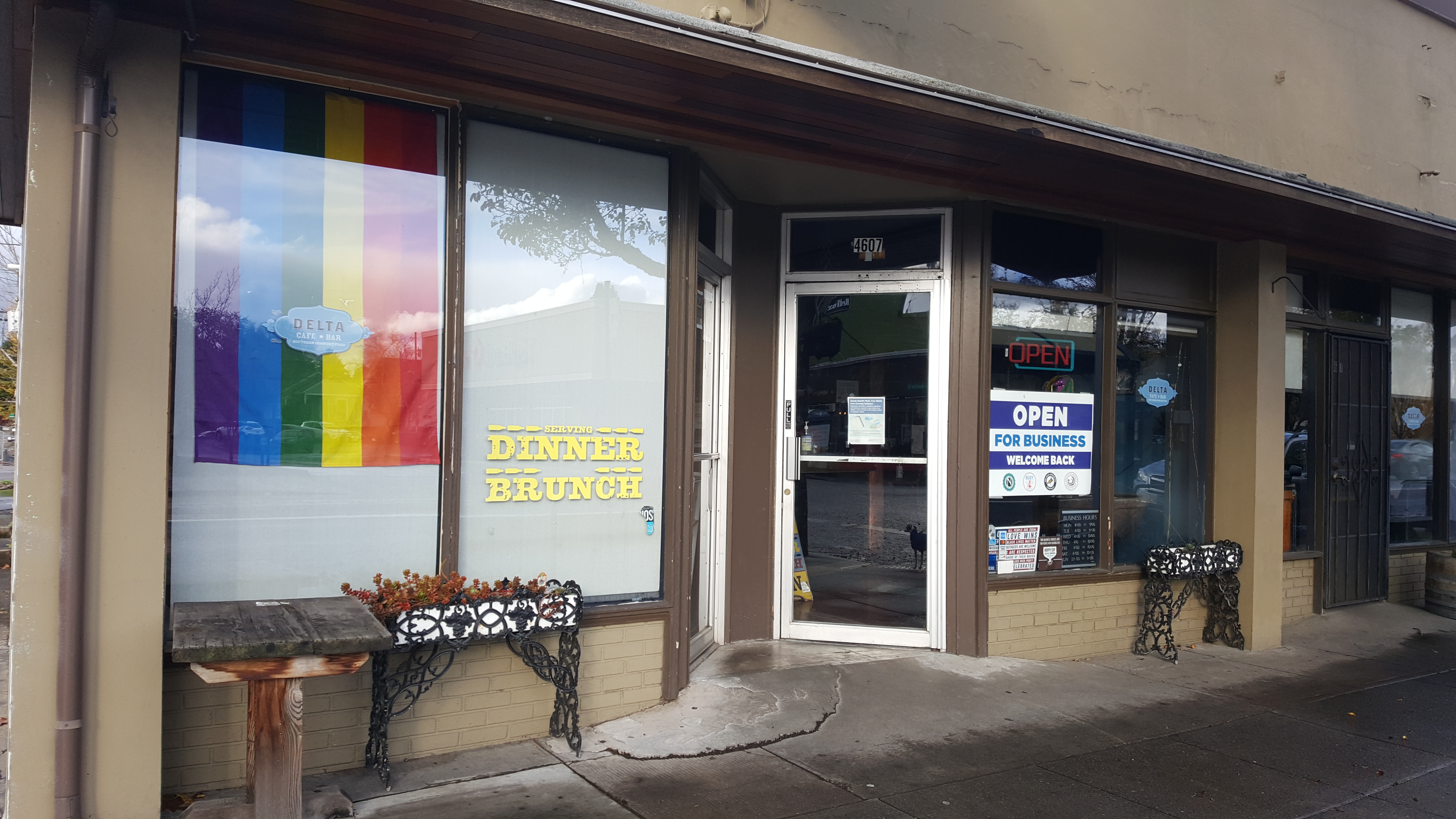
Restaurant entrance in November 2020, during the COVID-19 pandemic

In 2002, Delta Cafe tied with Mother's Bistro in the "best old hometown restaurant" category of Willamette Week's annual readers poll. The restaurant won the newspaper's "best down-home cookin'" category in 2007. In his 2003 travel book Fugitives and Refugees, Chuck Palahniuk published Delta's fritters recipe and said of the restaurant, "There isn't a disappointment on the whole menu." Eater Portland's Alex Frane included Delta in his 2018 list of the city's "killer Southern restaurants". He described Delta as "a staple for Reedies and other Woodstock residents" and recommended, "Bring a big appetite, especially for the huge brunch portions." Nathan Williams recommended Delta in the website's 2022 overview of Woodstock eateries.

Portland Monthly has said the cafe "thrives largely on an aesthetic of thrift-store kitsch, its double-wide ambience as brazen as a belle on a bender", and described the Delta Lounge as a "decorously knickknacked" bar with "inscrutably balanced" cocktails. The magazine said: "Indeed, the Delta's drinks temper the hipster vibe of the place, and the alternately sophisticated and rowdy infusions impart a charm and good humor often lost on many of Portland's swankier and pricier drinking establishments. Which makes any trip here a worthwhile foray into rebel territory." The magazine's John Chandler called Delta Cafe "a joint that earned its rep by dropping huge platters of Southern cooking on its customers for embarrassingly small sums of money" and wrote in 2010, "I can remember ordering the meatloaf special—with two sides—for five freakin' dollars. The Delta was never a bastion of culinary precision, and that's still the case, but the heaping portions are standard issue, and if you can make it to Happy Hour (3–6 daily), the prices are straight out of the late 20th century."

Thrillist recommends the restaurant "for old-school fried chicken, just like mom used to make". Zagat gives Delta ratings of 4.5 for food, 4.1 for decor, and 4.3 for service, each on a scale of 5. The guide said, "For tasty, homestyle Southern fare with Cajun inflections that comes in big, price-appropriate portions, locals point to this quirky Woodstock cafe as a perfect fit for eccentric East Portland; helpful servers contribute to the vibe, although for some it comes down to the PBR 40s on ice – isn't that why everyone goes?" Delta has been included in travel guides and walking tours of Portland.

== See also ==
- List of Cajun restaurants
- List of soul food restaurants
- List of Southern restaurants
