= Acadia: A New Orleans Bistro =

Defunct restaurant in Portland, Oregon, US

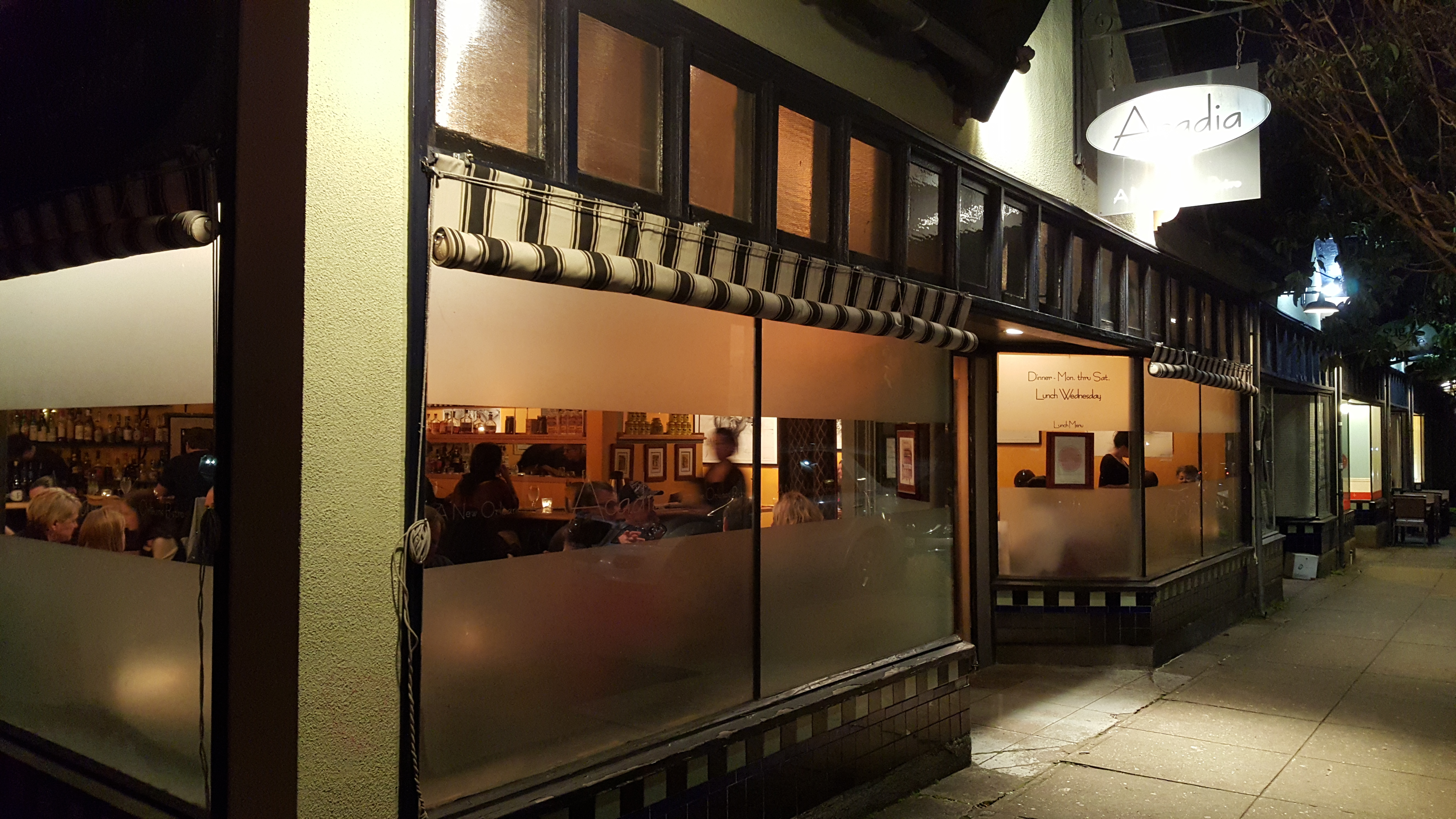
- The restaurant's exterior, 2016
- Interactive map of Acadia: A New Orleans Bistro

Restaurant information
- Closed: January 2022
- Food type: Cajun; Louisiana Creole; seafood; Southern
- Location: 1303 NE Fremont Street, Portland, Multnomah, Oregon, 97212, United States
- Coordinates: 45.54841°N 122.65262°W
- Website: acadiapdx.com

Acadia: A New Orleans Bistro, or simply Acadia, was a Cajun-, Louisiana Creole-, and Southern-style restaurant in northeast Portland, Oregon, in the United States.

== Description ==
Acadia was a Cajun-, Louisiana Creole- and Southern-style restaurant located at 1303 Northeast Fremont Street in Portland's Sabin neighborhood. Its specialities included grilled pork chops and barbecue shrimp; the menu also included catfish, filet mignon, gumbo, jambalaya, and homemade ice cream.

== History ==
Adam Higgs became owner in 2004. The restaurant closed in 2022, during the COVID-19 pandemic.

== Reception ==
The eighth edition of Best Places: Portland (2010) rates the restaurant two and a half out of three stars. In Food Lover's Guide to Portland (2014), Liz Crain included Acadia in her list of "go to" seafood restaurants. Willamette Week included the business in a 2016 list of Portland's best seafood establishments.

After recommending the Louisiana barbecue shrimp, andouille, and sanguinaccio in 2016, Michael Russell included Acadia in The Oregonian's 2017 overview of the 40 best restaurants in northeast Portland and wrote, "Portland might not be the first place I'd go looking for Cajun/Creole cuisine, but this charming Sabin neighborhood restaurant does have a few arguments in its favor, none more compelling than these beautiful Nola-style barbecue shrimp. Having tried both in the past year, I can definitively say that Acadia's rendition, with its plump shrimp in a decadent white wine, butter and lemon sauce, blows the original at New Orleans' Pascal Manale's completely out of the Gulf waters." He also included Acadia in the newspaper's 2018 list of Portland's 10 best Southern restaurants. Russell ranked the business number 32 and number 34 on 2018 and 2019 lists of the city's best restaurants, respectively.

== See also ==
- COVID-19 pandemic in Portland, Oregon
- Impact of the COVID-19 pandemic on the restaurant industry in the United States
- List of Cajun restaurants
- List of Louisiana Creole restaurants
- List of seafood restaurants
- List of Southern restaurants
