= The Parish =

Defunct restaurant in Portland, Oregon, U.S.

- The restaurant's interior in 2015
- Interactive map of The Parish

Restaurant information
- Established: May 22, 2012
- Closed: September 2016
- Previous owners: Tobias Hogan; Ethan Powell
- Food type: Cajun; Louisiana Creole; seafood
- Location: 231 Northwest 11th Avenue, Portland, Multnomah, Oregon, 97209, United States
- Coordinates: 45.52495°N 122.68246°W

The Parish was a Cajun, Louisiana Creole, and seafood restaurant in Portland, Oregon's Pearl District, in the United States. It was opened by Tobias Hogan and Ethan Powell in 2012, and became known for its oysters. In 2015, the restaurant was split in half, and one side of the space began serving brunch, lunch, and happy hour as the Palmetto Cafe. The Palmetto was converted into a private event space and pop-up restaurant in February 2016, and The Parish closed abruptly in September of that year.

== Description and history ==
The Parish (located at the corner of 11th and Everett in northwest Portland's Pearl District) was established in May 2012 by Tobias Hogan and Ethan Powell, who had operated the North Williams Avenue restaurant Eat: An Oyster Bar. It held three preview events—a private event with local blues duo Curtis Salgado and Alan Hager on May 18, a multi-course seated dinner on May 19, and "Sunday Jazz Brunch with Pete Krebs" on May 20—before opening to the public on May 22. The 80-seat restaurant replaced In Good Taste, a cooking school which occupied the space for eleven years and closed in February 2012. Its name (inspired by Louisiana's administrative divisions) was reflected by the restaurant's "ecclesiastical" interior, which included gray and pewter-colored "cathedral-esque" arches over the bar and a host stand which was a refurbished Prohibition-era Mississippi church pulpit.

The Cajun, Louisiana Creole, and New Orleans-style seafood restaurant served entrees such as andouille, étouffée, frog legs, jambalaya, maque choux, pork belly, and turtle soup, and was best known for its oysters. Its bar, Vieux Carré (French Quarter), served New Orleans cocktails including Bourbon-based drinks, daiquiris, and house infusions. The Parish's 4,000-square-foot (370 m^{2}) interior, designed by Mark Annen, had a shucking station, oak floors, French-blue walls with gray accents, exposed brickwork, subway tiles, and salvaged woodwork.

Hogan and Powell reportedly worked at both Eat and The Parish, switching daily. Like Eat, The Parish was a wholesale supplier of sustainably-farmed oysters to other Portland restaurants. Powell said about the difference between the two restaurants:

When we were doing the oyster bar, we wanted a turn-of-the-20th-century, early-1900s style—what you would find in Slidell, a po' boy shop with good gumbo and jambalaya, a little rowdy, where people consumed a lot of booze. The idea behind The Parish is to take it uptown, to the 1920s ... and (New Orleans') Garden District.

In July and August 2015, the restaurant was split in half, with one side serving brunch, lunch, and happy hour as the Palmetto Cafe. The 38-seat cafe's brunch menu included breakfast sandwiches, burritos, and pastries; its lunch menu included a fried green tomato sandwich with pimento cheese and coleslaw, po' boys, salads, and shrimp and grits. Fried chicken, kolaches, natchitoches meat pies, pimento cheeseburgers, seafood salads, and soft-boiled eggs were happy-hour menu items. In February 2016, the Palmetto was converted into a private event space and pop-up restaurant, and The Parish resumed serving lunch from 11:30 am to 3:00 pm on Fridays and Saturdays. The restaurant closed abruptly in September 2016, with little explanation.

== Reception ==
Interior of the Palmetto Cafe, 2015

According to The Portland Mercury's Marjorie Skinner, "Though the cocktail menu is as fancy as the next, the bar staff is unfussy and approachable, and food prices for the most part steer well clear of the $20 mark—downright cheap eats compared to the rest of the neighborhood." In her book, Food Lovers' Guide to Portland, Oregon: The Best Restaurants, Markets and Local Culinary Offerings (2014), Laurie Wolf wrote: "I like The Parish. I like the guys who own it, Tobias Hogan and Ethan Powell. For the Pearl neighborhood the prices are super reasonable and the small menu certainly delivers the best of the offerings." In her book, Seafood Lover's Pacific Northwest: Restaurants, Markets, Recipes & Traditions (2014), Karen Gaudette Brewer complimented the "open, warm and fun" restaurant with a caveat: "Like its sister restaurant, The Parish can get a little too laid back when it comes to service and consistency." In 2015, after the opening of the Palmetto Cafe, Willamette Week's Robert Fernas called The Parish a leading destination for oysters and said that the restaurant was not negatively impacted by the split.

== See also ==
- List of Cajun restaurants
- List of Louisiana Creole restaurants
- List of seafood restaurants
