= Springwater Cart Park =

Food cart pod in Portland, Oregon, U.S.

- Cartlandia
- Logo
- Location: Portland, Oregon
- Address: 8145 Southeast 82nd Avenue
- Location within Portland, Oregon
- Coordinates: 45°27′49″N 122°34′47″W

Springwater Cart Park, formerly known as Cartlandia, is a food cart pod in Portland, Oregon, United States.

== Description ==
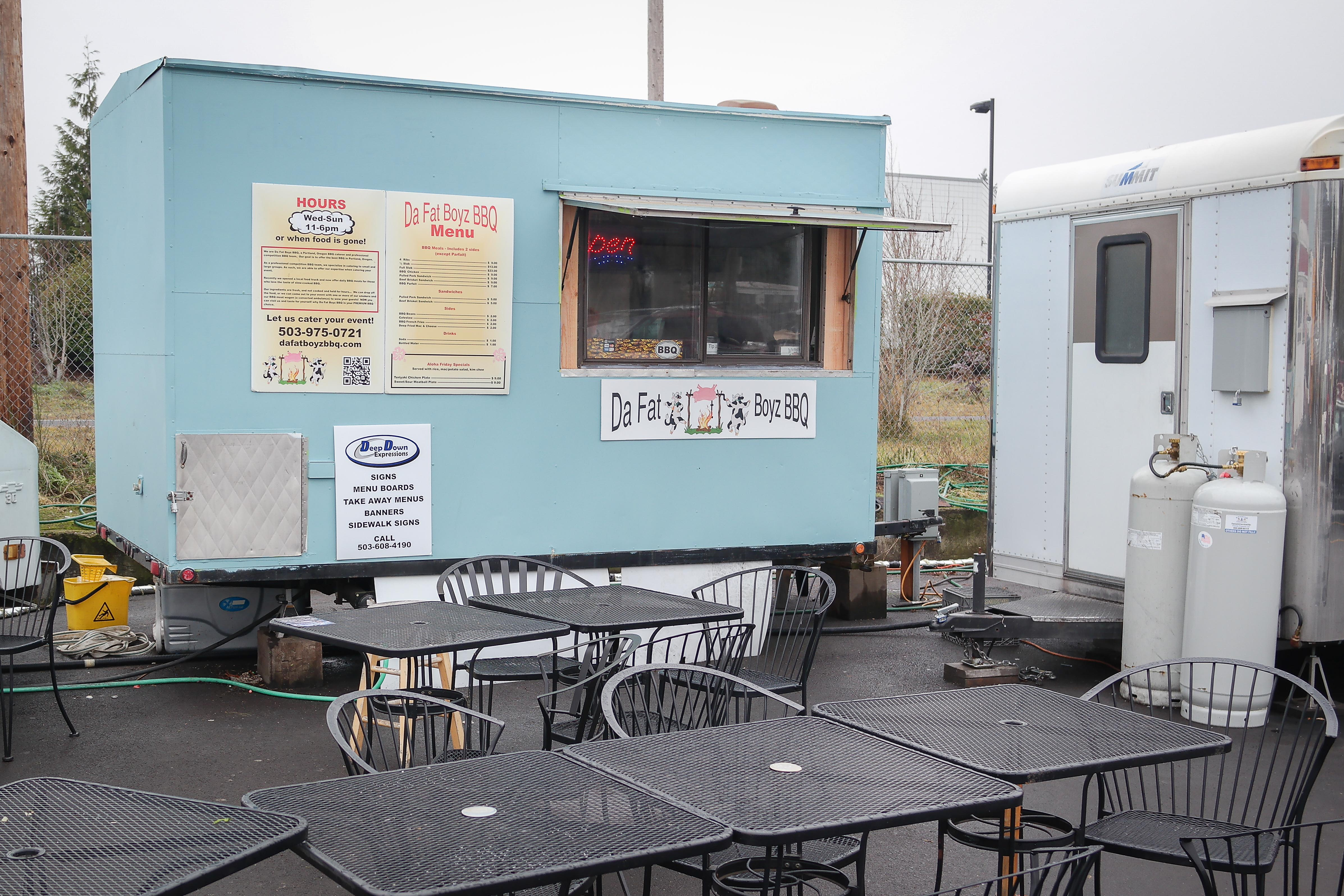
Food cart at Cartlandia, 2013

The pod is located near the intersection of 82nd Avenue and the Springwater Corridor in southeast Portland's Brentwood-Darlington neighborhood. There are about 30 food carts at this location and it is one of the largest food cart sites in Oregon.

== History ==
Owner Roger Goldingay opened the pod in 2011. In 2016, he joined a coalition to sue the city and Mayor Charlie Hales in an effort to overturn a law permitting homeless people to camp and sleep on sidewalks. The pod was burglarized in 2016 and 2020. It became known as Springwater Cart Park.

In September 2025, an accidental explosion caused by a propane leak within one of the carts damaged over eight food carts and two buildings, some of which are believed to be a total loss. There were no injuries.

=== Tenants ===
Tenants have included Best Taste of India, Habibi Shawarma and Gyro, Mucho Sabor, Philly Billy, Nacheaux, and Taste of Mongolia.
