= The Boiling Crab =

American restaurant chain

- Type: Private
- Industry: Foodservice
- Founded: 2004
- Founders: Sinh Nguyen; Dada Ngo
- Number of locations: 30 (2024)
- Area served: Southwestern United States
- Website: theboilingcrab.com

The Boiling Crab is an American restaurant chain serving food from Cajun cuisine. Founded in 2004, the chain has 30 restaurants, mostly in California.

== History ==
The Boiling Crab was founded by Sinh Nguyen and Dada Ngo, a Vietnamese husband-and-wife couple. Nguyen's family mainly worked as crabbers or fishermen in the small Texan town of Seadrift. They opened the chain's first restaurant in 2004 in Garden Grove's Little Saigon. Its popularity has caused many other, similar Cajun restaurants to appear in Southern California. It opened its first intercontinental location in the Kakaʻako district of Honolulu, Hawaii, in 2016. The first international restaurant was opened in May 2020 in Shanghai. Locations in Australia started operation in early 2021. 2021 was also when a Boiling Crab in Washington, D.C., opened, in July of that year. Meanwhile, a Harvard Square location in Cambridge, Massachusetts, began business in early 2022.

== Menu ==
The chain offers ten different seafood options to choose from: blue crab, dungeness crab, lobster, shrimp, crayfish, oysters, clams, mussels, and the legs of a snow crab or red king crab. Frozen crayfish are used when they are off-season. After a customer has selected their choice of meat, they can choose from four sauces: Rajun Cajun, Lemon Pepper, Garlic Butter, and their trademarked "The Whole Sha-Bang!", their signature sauce combining the former three into one. Finally, the consumer will then pick the level of spice that the seafood will have. Other menu items include gumbo, corn on the cob, andouille, potatoes, french fries, sweet potato fries, calamari, chicken tenders, and catfish. The Shanghai location has four more items than the American ones: the edible crab, Chinese mitten crab, whiteleg shrimp, and the New Zealand green-lipped mussel.

Customers eat with their hands and are provided bibs to ensure food does not accidentally stain their clothes. The tables are covered in butcher paper.

== Locations ==
The majority of The Boiling Crab's thirty restaurants are located in California. Of these sixteen, twelve can be found in Southern California, while the other four are in the North, with two each in San Jose and Sacramento. The only other American state with more than one location is Texas, with restaurants in Dallas, Plano, and Austin. In the United States, the chain is also found in Nevada, Hawaii, Florida, Massachusetts, and Virginia, in the cities of Las Vegas, Honolulu, South Miami, Cambridge, and Richmond, respectively. There is also a restaurant in Washington, D.C. In addition to the ones in the U.S., The Boiling Crab also has five international locations. Three of those are in Australia, with two in Melbourne and one in Sydney. The others are in Riyadh in Saudi Arabia and Shanghai in China.

== See also ==
- The Kickin' Crab
