= Nacheaux =

Restaurant in Portland, Oregon, U.S.

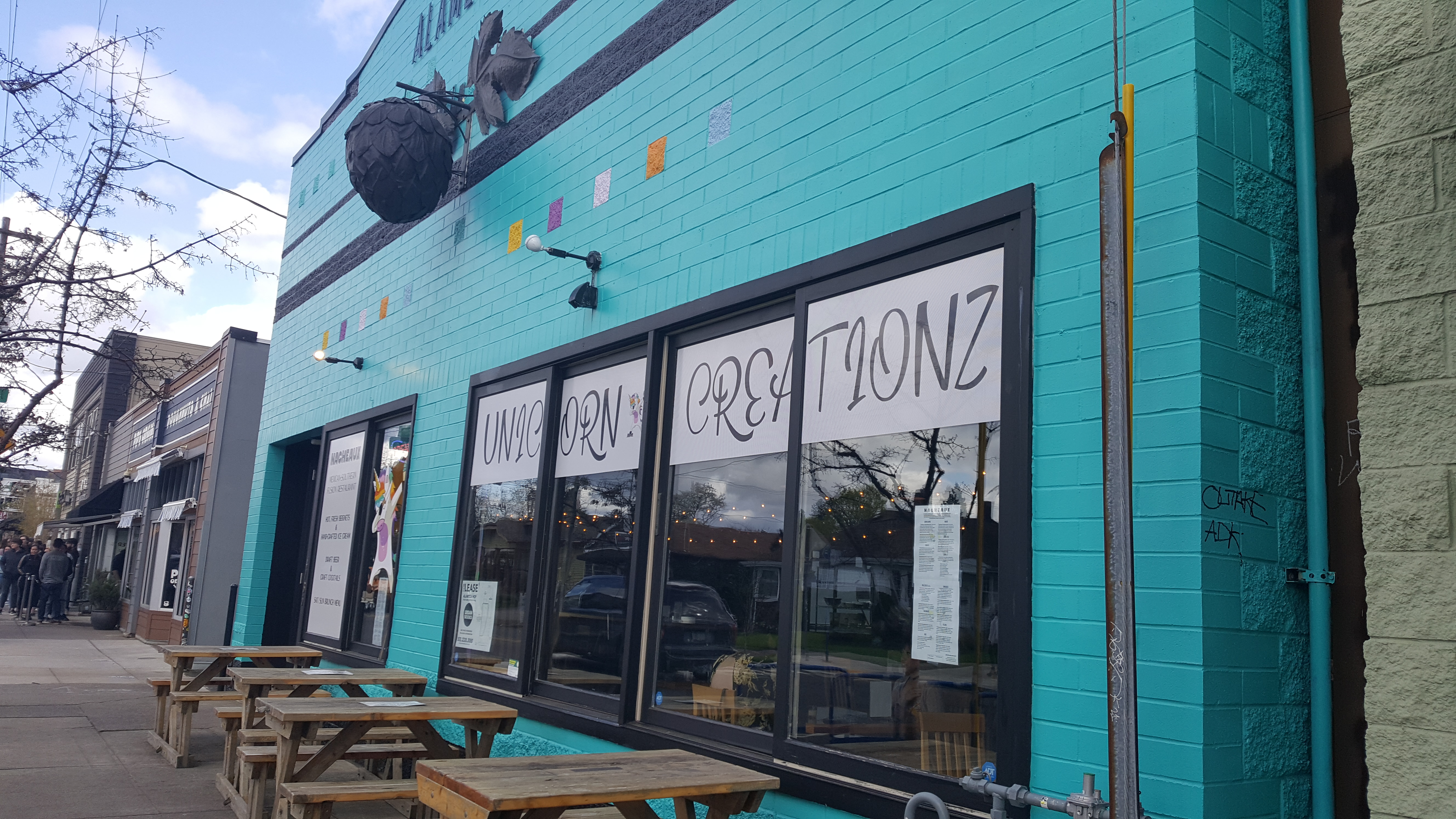
- The restaurant's exterior in 2022
- Interactive map of Nacheaux

Restaurant information
- Owners: Anthony Brown; Stephanie Brown
- Chef: Anthony Brown
- Food type: Mexican; Cajun; Southern
- Location: 1720 Willamette Falls Drive, West Linn, Oregon, 97068, United States
- Coordinates: 45.3441°N 122.6567°W
- Website: nacheauxpdx.com

Nacheaux is a Mexican-Cajun fusion restaurant in West Linn, Oregon. Previously, the business operated in Portland.

== Description ==
Nacheaux is a Black-owned restaurant in West Linn, which previously operated in Portland. The menu features Mexican-Cajun cuisine, including fried-chicken crunch wraps, churro beignets, macaroni and cheese with seafood, and nachos. KGW's Christine Pitawanich described the menu as "Mexican/southern fusion", offering Cinnamon Toast Crunch cheesecake and fried chicken enchiladas. The menu also includes carnitas, catfish, red beans and rice, and tacos.

== History ==
Anthony and Stephanie Brown opened Nacheaux as a food cart in southeast Portland's Cartlandia pod (now known as the Springwater Cart Park) in March 2020, during the COVID-19 pandemic. Anthony also serves as chef.

The food cart closed in February 2021 and began operating as a brick and mortar restaurant in northeast Portland's Cully neighborhood in March.

In 2022, the business closed temporarily to relocate to West Linn. Nacheaux reopened on July 27.

== Reception ==
In 2021, Portland Monthly's Katherine Chew Hamilton included Nacheaux in a list of the eight "most mouthwatering" nachos in the city.

== See also ==
- List of Black-owned restaurants
- List of Cajun restaurants
- List of Mexican restaurants
- List of Southern restaurants
