= List of Louisiana Creole restaurants =

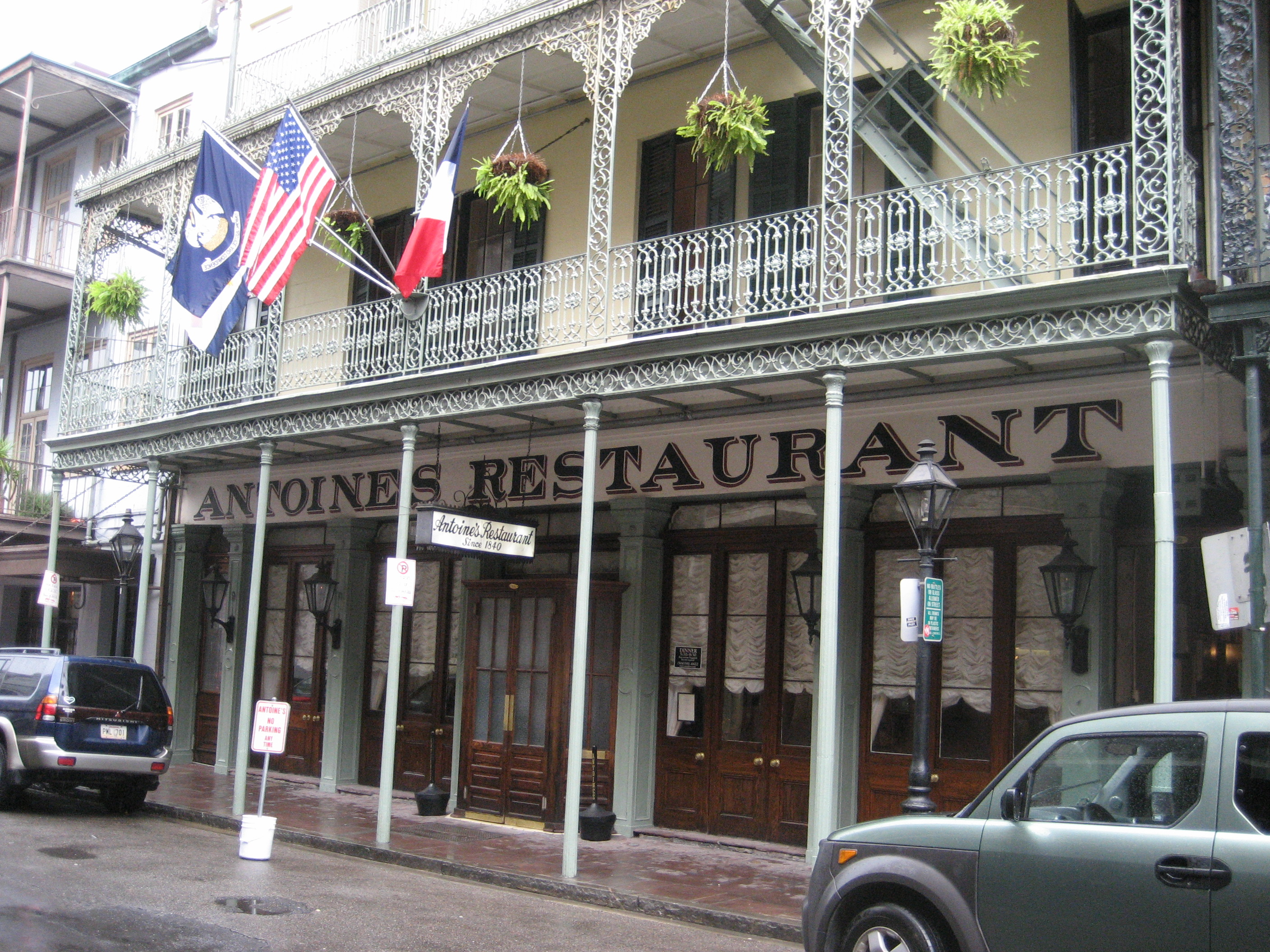
Antoine's, New Orleans, Louisiana, U.S.

Following is a list of notable Louisiana Creole restaurants:

- Acadia: A New Orleans Bistro, Portland, Oregon, U.S.
- Antoine's, New Orleans, Louisiana, U.S.
- Arnaud's, New Orleans
- Brennan's, New Orleans
- Broussard's, New Orleans
- Café du Monde, New Orleans
- Eat: An Oyster Bar, Portland, Oregon
- Galatoire's, New Orleans
- Mosca's, New Orleans
- The Parish, Portland, Oregon
- Upperline Restaurant, New Orleans
