= Mexican Creole hairless pig =

Breed of pig

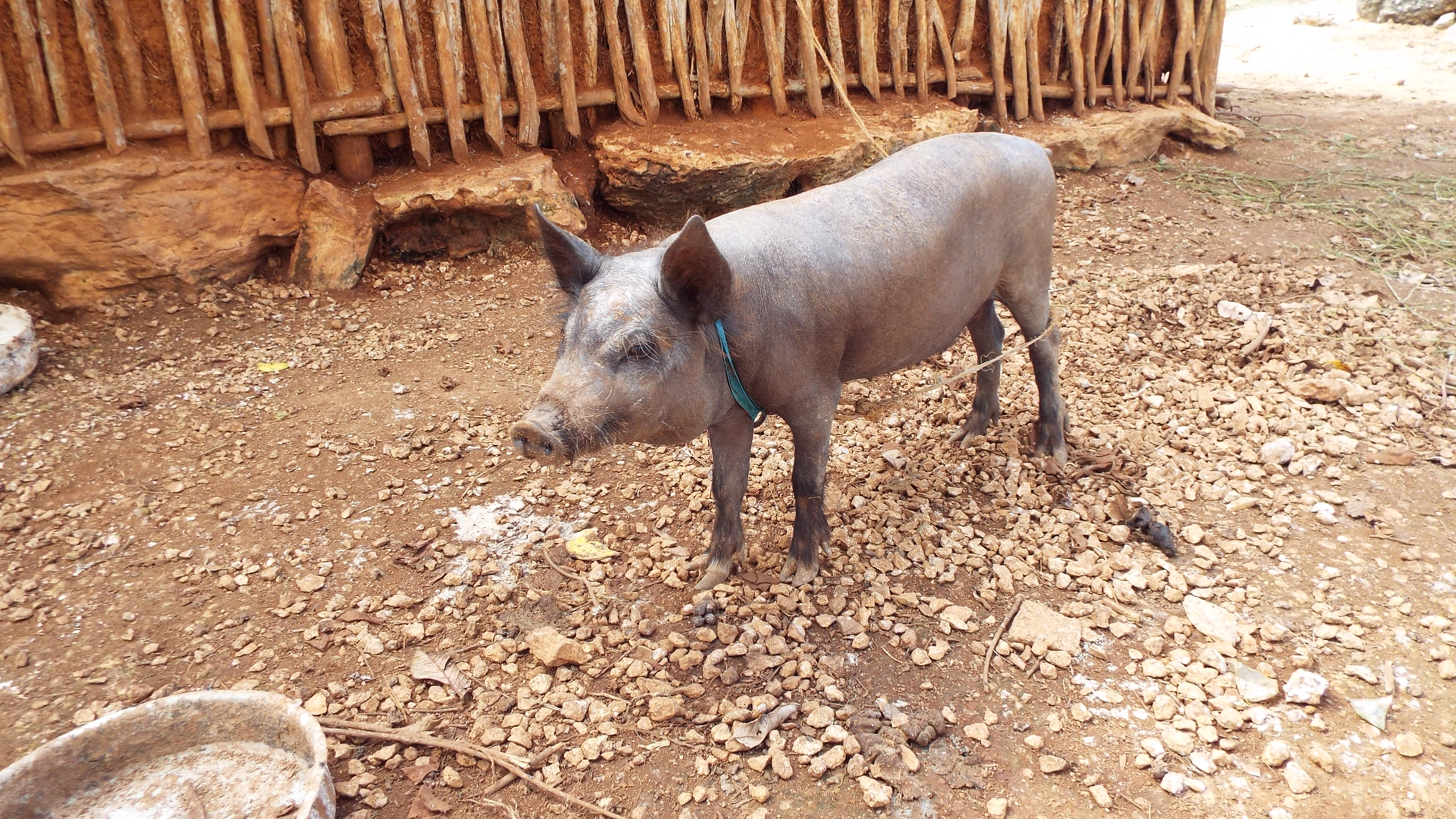
- Country of origin: Mexico

Traits

The Mexican Creole hairless pig is a unique genotype that is believed to have been introduced to Mexico during the Spanish conquest. The genotype is being conserved by researchers of UNAM at the Faculty of veterinary medicine and animal husbandry.

The Mexican Creole hairless pig, known as cerdo pelón in Spanish, is small with a grey/black color and no hair. It has a narrow snout and long head. The cerdo pelón has been used in traditional Yucatán cuisine for dishes like Cochinita pibil and "Cabeza de cochino."

The Mexican Creole hairless pig is now considered endangered. It is threatened by the popularity of and crossbreeding with industrial breeds like the Large White pig and Duroc pig. A similar breed to the cerdo pelón, the Creole pig of Haiti, is now considered extinct.
