= Upperline Restaurant =

Restaurant in New Orleans

Upperline Restaurant, or simply Upperline, was a fine dining restaurant in New Orleans, Louisiana, United States. The restaurant was housed in a yellow townhouse located at 1413 Upperline Street in Uptown New Orleans near the St. Charles Streetcar Line. It was celebrated for mixing Cajun, Louisiana Creole, and Southern cuisine.

In November 2021, Clevenger announced the restaurant would not be reopening and that she and her family planned to sell the building and possibly the business.

== History ==
JoAnnClevenger opened Upperline in 1983 and co-owned it with her son Jason Clevenger, the restaurant's first chef, and husband Alan Greenacre. During the 1960s and 1970s Clevenger worked as a bartender on Bourbon Street and became involved in the bohemian scene in New Orleans, meeting playwright Tennessee Williams, photographer Lee Friedlander, artist Noel Rockmore, and other well-known figures. Though Clevenger was not a chef, she developed Upperline's signature dish of fried green tomatoes with shrimp rémoulade, and inspired many other menu items.

Upperline temporarily closed in March 2020 as a result of the COVID-19 pandemic. In November 2021, Clevenger announced the restaurant would not be reopening and that she and her family planned to sell the building and possibly the business.

== Art ==
Upperline was celebrated for its art collection focused on local artists. The collection contained at least 400 artworks, including portraits of Clevenger and Upperline staff members, a painting of artist Gertrude Morgan by Noel Rockmore, another Rockmore painting of New Orleans musician Frank Moliere, and renditions by other artists of New Orleans musicians James Booker and Buddy Bolden. Clevenger began the collection in 1960, when she briefly managed an art gallery in the French Quarter. The collection was offered for sale as part of Upperline's November 2021 closing.

== Reception ==
Upperline was popular with local residents and the cultural elite alike. Led Zeppelin lead singer Robert Plant, Amazon founder Jeff Bezos, novelist and philanthropist MacKenzie Scott, and relatives of The New York Times executive editor and New Orleans native Dean Baquet—among many other well-known figures—dined at the restaurant.

Author and New Orleans native Walter Isaacson said of Clevenger, "She knew how to tie together great ingredients, both in her dishes and her dining room."

== Popular culture ==
Upperline's roast duck was featured as one of chef Simon Majumdar's favorite dishes in Season 4, Episode 10 of the television program The Best Thing I Ever Ate.

== See also ==
- List of Cajun restaurants
- List of Louisiana Creole restaurants
- List of Southern restaurants
