= The Kickin' Crab =

American restaurant chain

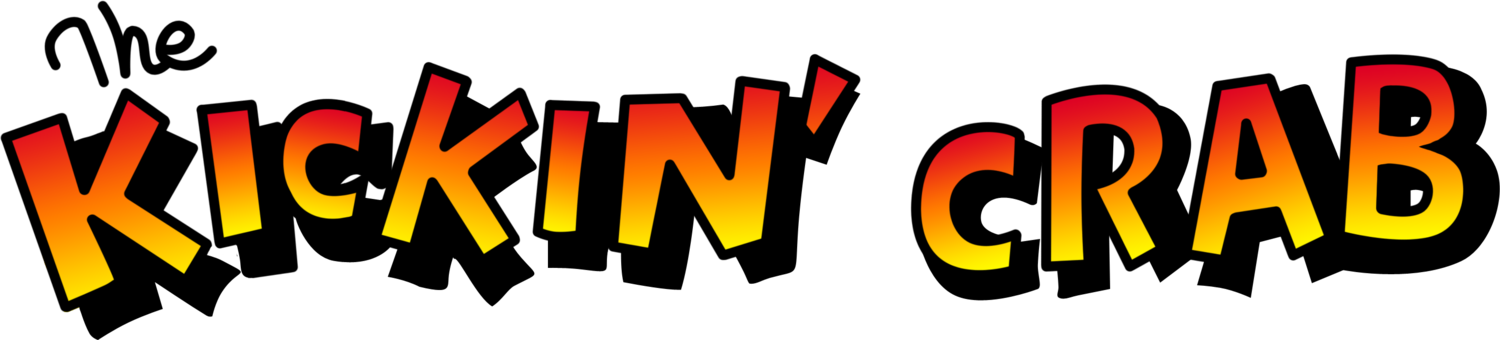

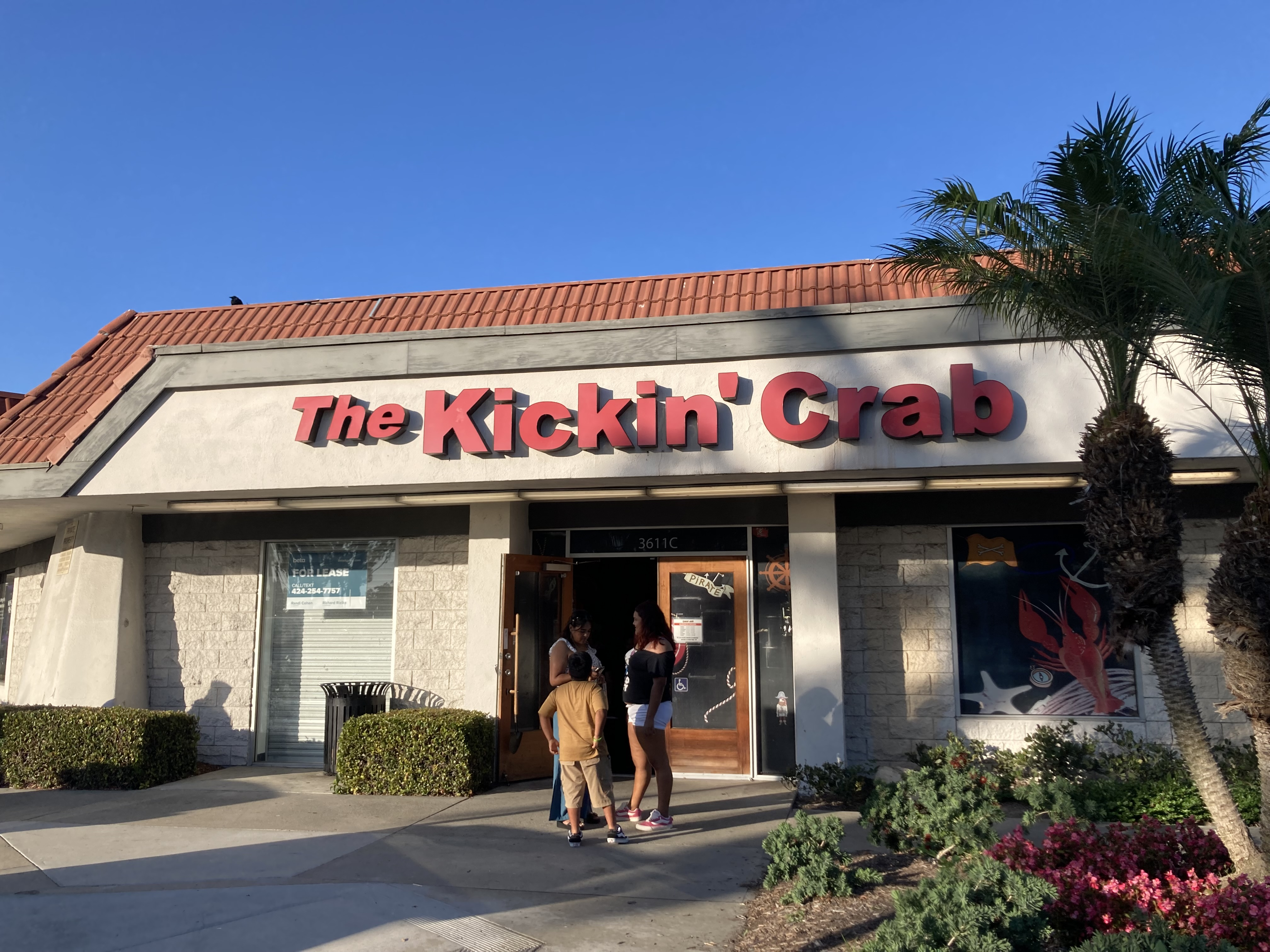
- Exterior of the Costa Mesa, California location
- Type: Private
- Industry: Foodservice
- Founded: 2010
- Number of locations: 23 (3 upcoming) (2024)
- Area served: Southwestern United States
- Owner: Jan Nguyen
- Website: thekickincrab.com

The Kickin' Crab is an American restaurant serving food from Cajun cuisine. It was founded in 2010 and has 23 restaurants mainly in the Southwestern United States.

== History ==
The restaurant was established in Southern California in 2010 by Jan Nguyen, who had previously founded many other restaurant concepts. It opened its first Arizona location in June 2023, in Chandler.

== Menu ==
For starters, the restaurant offers oysters, buffalo wings, chicken tenders, fish and chips, shrimp wonton, popcorn shrimp, edamame, french fries, sweet potato fries, calamari, fish tacos, coconut sea snails, garlic noodles, clam chowder, and gumbo. Its main course consists of scampi, fettuccine Alfredo, tilapia, trout, shrimp, lobster, and king crab legs. Sides include steamed broccoli, pita, and red rice.

Customers eat with their hands and are provided bibs to ensure food does not accidentally stain their clothes. The tables are covered in butcher paper.

== Locations ==
As of 2024, The Kickin' Crab has 23 locations, with three upcoming. Of those 23, seventeen are in California, with most of them being in the southern part of the state. The other six consist of four in Texas, and two in Chandler, Arizona, and St. Louis, Missouri. Soon-to-be-opened locations will result in the chain's expansion to the Eastern U.S. in Atlanta, Georgia.

== See also ==
- The Boiling Crab
