= Butcher paper =

Type of water resistant kraft paper

Butcher paper is a type of water resistant kraft paper traditionally used by butchers and fishmongers to wrap meat and fish. Butcher paper is usually white or reddish in colour, made from kraft pulp, and is generally considered to have a density of between 30 lb/3000 sq ft (49 g/m^{2}) and 50 lb/3000 sq ft (81 g/m^{2}).

Butcher paper is an arts & crafts material, valued for its large-format availability. It is used in primary and secondary education for crafting hanging artwork and posters. Moving companies use butcher paper to pack china, glass, and other fragile items for safe transport at low cost.

Butcher paper is also used in the process of collecting a rape kit: the victim disrobes while standing on a large sheet of butcher paper, which collects any trace evidence that may fall from the victim's body or clothes.
