= Creole cuisine =

Cuisine style

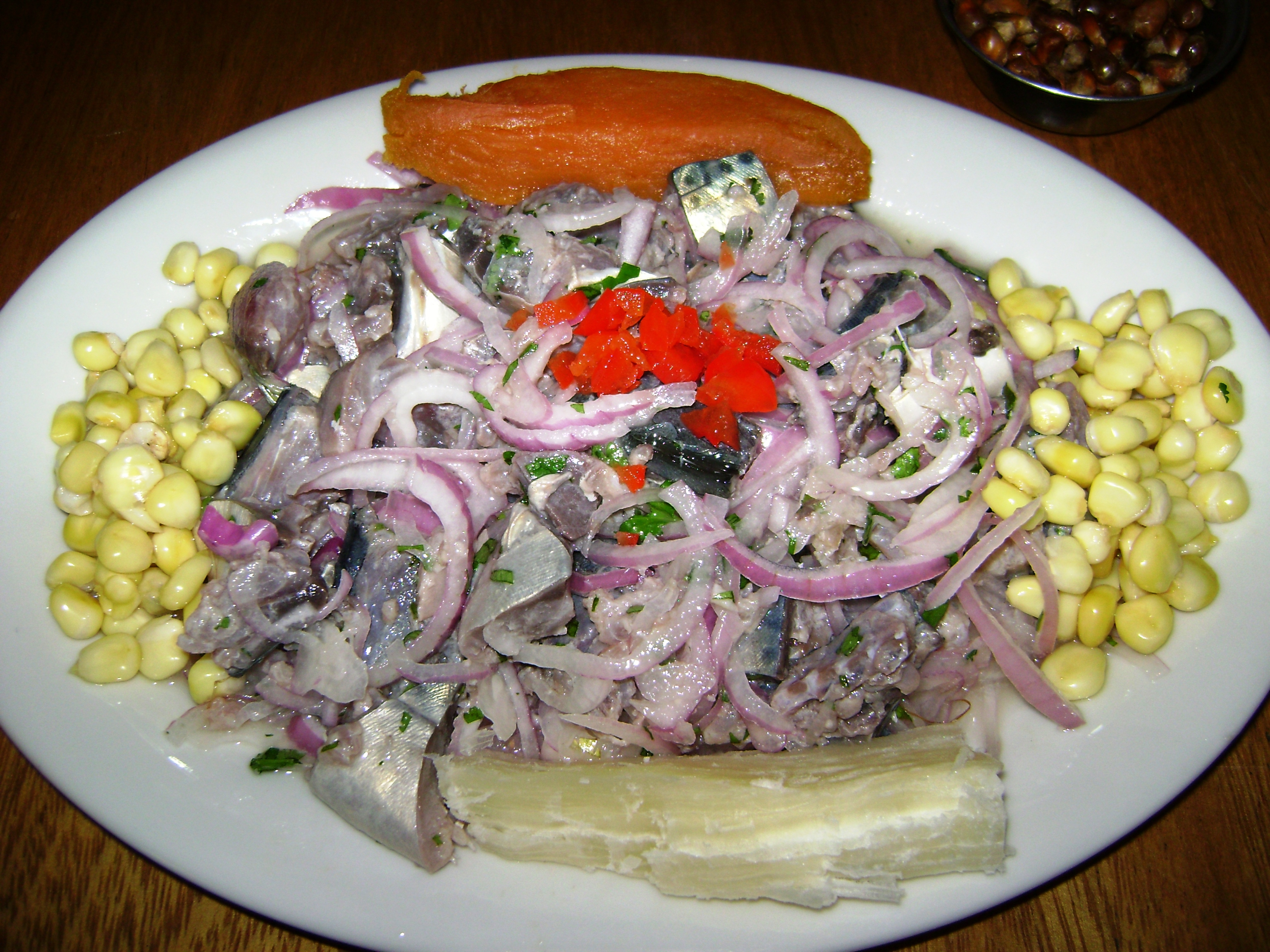
Ceviche is a representative dish of the Creole cuisine in different coastal regions in Latin America.

Creole cuisine (French: cuisine créole; Portuguese: culinária crioula; Spanish: cocina criolla) is a cuisine style born in colonial times, from the fusion between African, European and pre-Columbian traditions. Creole is a term that refers to those of European origin who were born in the New World and have adapted to it (melting pot). According to Norwegian anthropologist Thomas Hylland Eriksen, "a Creole society (...) is based wholly or partly on the mass displacement of people who were, often involuntarily, uprooted from their original home, shedding the main features of their social and political organisations on the way, brought into sustained contact with people from other linguistic and cultural areas and obliged to develop, in creative and improvisational ways, new social and cultural forms in the new land, drawing simultaneously on traditions from their respective places of origin and on impulses resulting from the encounter."

Creole cuisine is found in different regions of the world that were previously European colonies. Creole food can be found in Louisiana (United States), Cuba, Brazil, Peru, the French Antilles, French Guiana, Réunion (France), Mauritius, Jamaica and the Dominican Republic (Caribbean), Mexico, Annobón (Equatorial Guinea), Sierra Leone, Liberia, Cape Verde, Haiti and others. In each region, Creole cuisine has adapted to local products (so there is no "single" Creole cuisine); however, they share certain features in common:

- Association of very different products in the same dish (compared to traditional European cuisine).
- Very spicy flavors, mixtures of sweet and salty, and pungent preparations.
- Relatively simple common culinary techniques, such as frying or stewing meat (called ragout). Adobos (marinades) are also common. Grilled dishes rarely exist.

In Hispanic America, many Creole dishes are named with the ending a la criolla, such as pollo a la criolla or colitas de res a la criolla or simply with the adjective criollo/a, as in vinagre criollo ('Creole vinegar') or chorizo criollo. Also in French, the terms à la créole or just créole are used, such as in pâté créole.

== Terminology ==
Creole comes from the Portuguese crioulo, from the verb 'to raise.' In French, the term is créole. The word can refer to many things, but all of these things are the product of the mixing of three continents: the creole languages are a mix between a European language, a Native American language, and the languages brought by enslaved Africans. The term can also refer to the Criollo horse, creole music, the creole circus, or to the popular Cuban dance called the "creole."

A creole person can be a black person descended from African slaves or a creole person can be descended from European slave owners born in the Europeans' American colonies. In Spanish, the term can also refer to any person native to a Latin American country.

== By region ==
- Argentinian Creole cuisine
- Brazilian Creole cuisine
- Guianan Creole cuisine
- Louisiana Creole cuisine
- Reunionese Creole cuisine
- Mauritian Creole cuisine
- Caribbean Creole cuisine
- Mexican Creole cuisine
- Peruvian Creole cuisine

=== Creole cuisine in Brazil ===
In Brazilian cuisine, people speak of culinária crioula to refer, in particular, to the notable influence that African cuisine (and, in a broader sense, the whole of African culture) had on colonial Brazilian society. African slaves' cuisine adapted to local ingredients, such as mandioca (cassava) or milho (corn), although they also imported ingredients from the other side of the Atlantic, such as azeite de dendê (palm oil), cuscuz (couscous), the coconut, or coffee. In terms of dishes, one that has its origins in African slaves' cuisine is feijoada, which is today considered to be the national dish of Brazil.

Brazilian creole cuisine is related to candomblé, an Afro-American religion with its origins in the Yoruba religion, just like Cuban Santeria. In this religion, "food plays a fundamental role, since it is considered to be a link between men and the Orishas." Dishes representative of candomblé are acarajé, caruru, or vatapá.

=== Creole cuisine in Louisiana ===
Creole cuisine in Louisiana is influenced by African, Caribbean, French, Spanish, and American cuisines. While it shares many traits with Cajun gastronomy (both originated in Louisiana), the two differ in terms of their origins. Louisiana Creole cuisine was developed by creoles from Louisiana—in other words, Spaniards and French born in Louisiana—while Cajun cuisine originated from Cajuns or Acadians (originating from the Acadiana region) and with great influence from Creole cuisine.

=== Creole cuisine in Réunion ===
Réunion is an island that was populated principally by French, Africans, Indians, and Chinese. This small island in the Mascarene archipelago can be found in the Indian Ocean near Madagascar and the African continent, and has long been a French territory. Reunionese cuisine is also considered to be creole, since much of its culinary tradition comes from France (such as bonbons or civet), but the ingredients used are local (from Asia and Africa) and are considered to be exotic in metropolitan France.

=== Mauritian Creole cuisine ===
The creole cuisine is eaten by every Mauritian and has its influences from African, Indian and French cuisine. Mauritian Creole dishes typically involves the consumption of seafood, meat, fresh vegetables, pulses, beans, corn and tapioca.

=== Creole cuisine in Hispanic America ===
Hispanic American creole cuisine fuses Spanish and indigenous elements from Spanish-speaking areas. It is prepared with key local ingredients such as potato, tomato, or corn, planted and harvested in their place of origin. Creole influence is clear in the case of Cuban, Puerto Rican, Dominican, Central American, Colombian, Ecuadorian, Venezuelan, Peruvian, Mexican, and Bolivian creole cuisine.

==== Cuba ====
Cuban creole cuisine is typically centered around beans, pork, and rice as the main ingredients. In the 1850s, the emergence of Cuban cookbooks on the island began to highlight a distinct "Cuban" or "creole" cuisine. In addition to making use of foreign ingredients, Cuban creole cuisine also made regular use of produce endemic to the island of Cuba, especially viandas, which are a category of carbohydrate-rich produce that include sweet potatoes, cassava, and green plantains. Interestingly, besides their seeming ubiquity in Cuban creole cuisine, viandas are also known for their medicinal qualities, commonly being used to ease upset stomachs.

==== Mexico ====
In Mexico, the term creole differs slightly, since it refers to agricultural products native to Mexico that are considered to be vegetable relics, meaning, fruits or vegetables that are cultivated on a local scale (typical to a particular region), following the ancient techniques that pre-Columbian societies used, without variations in the cultivar (their size, color, and flavor are all the same). Examples of this include creole corn, cacao, and chili, which are the "purest" of their cultivar types.

Creole can also refer to an imported fruit or vegetable that, after adapting to the local climate, has taken on a new form entirely. One example of this is the creole peach, which is smaller in size and is sweeter, yellower, and harder than the original peach. Or, in rarer cases, the term can refer to hybrid varieties.

==== Peru ====
A creole cuisine has also developed along the coast of Peru, with Spanish, African, Italian, and Chinese influences. One of the signature dishes of Peruvian creole cuisine is ceviche, which is prepared with fresh fish that has been cured in lemon juice. Other dishes are ají de gallina, carapulca, and tacu-tacu.

== See also ==
- List of cuisines
- Creolization
- Criollo cheese
- Salsa criolla
- Pabellón criollo
- Mexican Creole hairless pig
