= Hasty pudding (disambiguation) =

Hasty pudding is a porridge of grains cooked in milk or water.

Hasty Pudding may also refer to:

- The Hasty-Pudding, a 1796 poem by Joel Barlow
- Hasty Pudding cipher, a variable-block-size block cipher designed by Richard Schroeppel
- Hasty Pudding Club, a Harvard University social club
- Hasty Pudding Theatricals, a theatrical student society at Harvard
