= Salmon and peas =

Traditional July 4th dish in New England, US

Salmon and peas is a common Fourth of July dish in New England. Although recipes often claim that it dates to before the American Revolution, it is first attested in the 1860s.

The dish is usually served with new potatoes, and may be topped with a creamy butter-herb sauce and chopped hard-boiled eggs. There are many variations.

Abigail Adams is said to have served salmon, peas, and new potatoes for her husband, John Adams, in 1776, on the first Fourth of July, but historians point out that the couple were in different cities during the first Fourth of July celebration.

The tradition most likely has its origins in the abundance of salmon in American rivers in the past and the annual salmon run, which coincides with Fourth of July celebrations. Salmon is no longer seasonal, as most salmon today is farmed.
