= Giovanni Amato =

Italian businessperson

- Born: 4 March 1875; Naples, Italy
- Died: 2 February 1959 (aged 83); Cumberland, Maine, U.S.
- Spouse: Michelina Amato (m. 1896–1959; his death)
- Culinary career
- Previous restaurant: Amato's (1902)

Giovanni Amato (4 March 1875 – 2 February 1959) was an Italian businessman. He established Amato's, originally a bakery, which is still in operation today. He is believed to have created the Maine Italian sandwich.

== Early life ==
Amato was born in 1875 in Naples, Italy. He emigrated to the United States around the turn of the 20th century.

== Career ==
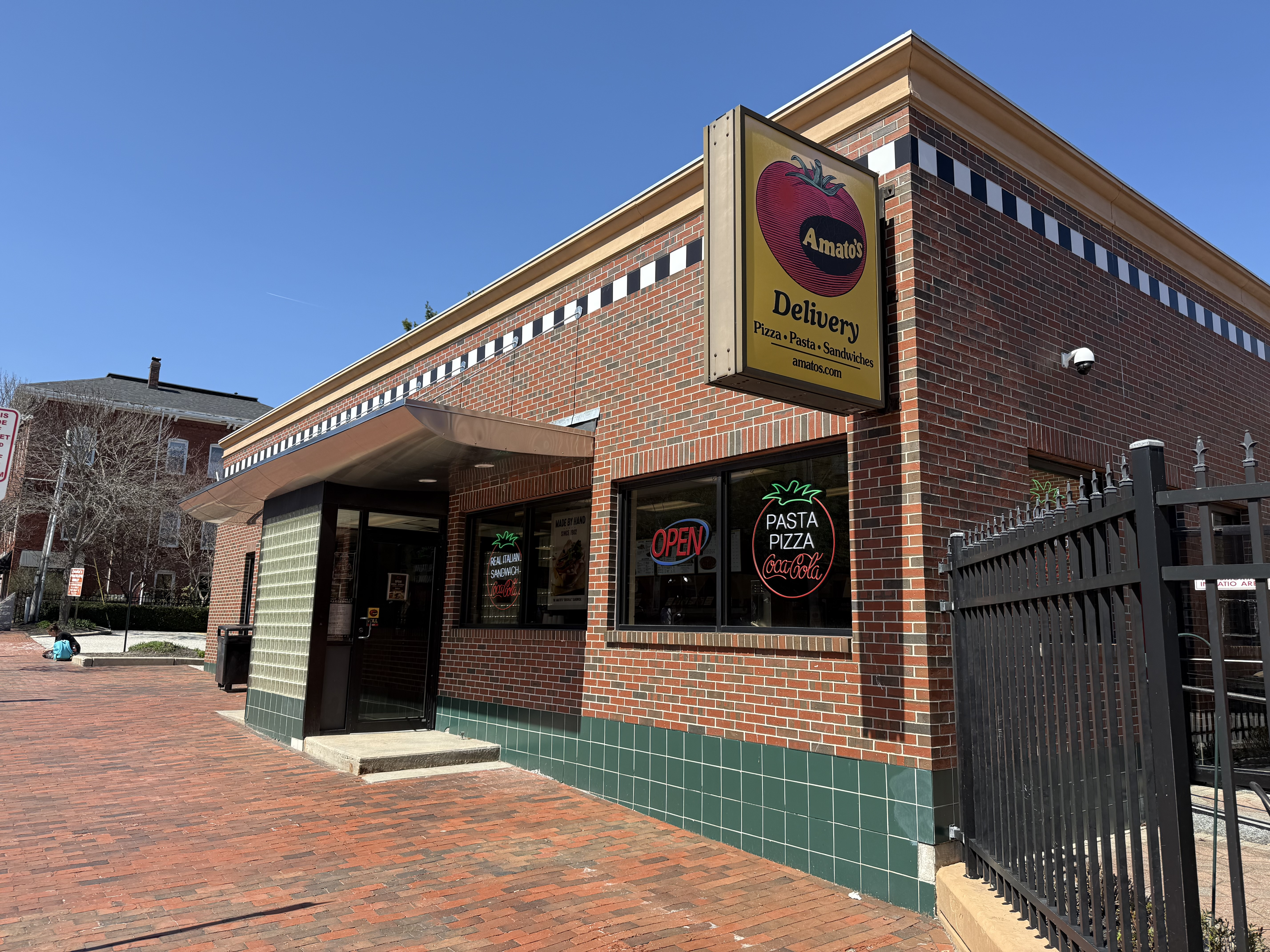
The rebuilt Amato's on India Street in Portland

In 1902, he opened Amato's Bakery, a foodcart on the working waterfront in the Old Port of Portland, Maine. He was asked by the dockworkers to split the loan loaves of bread he was selling and fill them with meats, cheeses, tomatoes, peppers, pickles, onion and olives. He later opened a store on India Street, which is still operating today, albeit in a new building. He created the Maine Italian sandwich in 1899.

Amato's was run by the Amato family until 1972, when they sold it to compatriot Dominic Reali.

== Personal life ==
In 1896, Amato married Michelina, with whom he had at least eleven children. The family lived at 109 Newbury Street. In 1924, Michelina owned property at 67 and 69–71 India Street and at 120–128 Newbury Street.

== Death ==
Amato died in February 1959, aged 83. He was interred in Calvary Cemetery in South Portland. His widow was buried beside him upon her death nine months later.
