= Charlotte (cake) =

Icebox cake

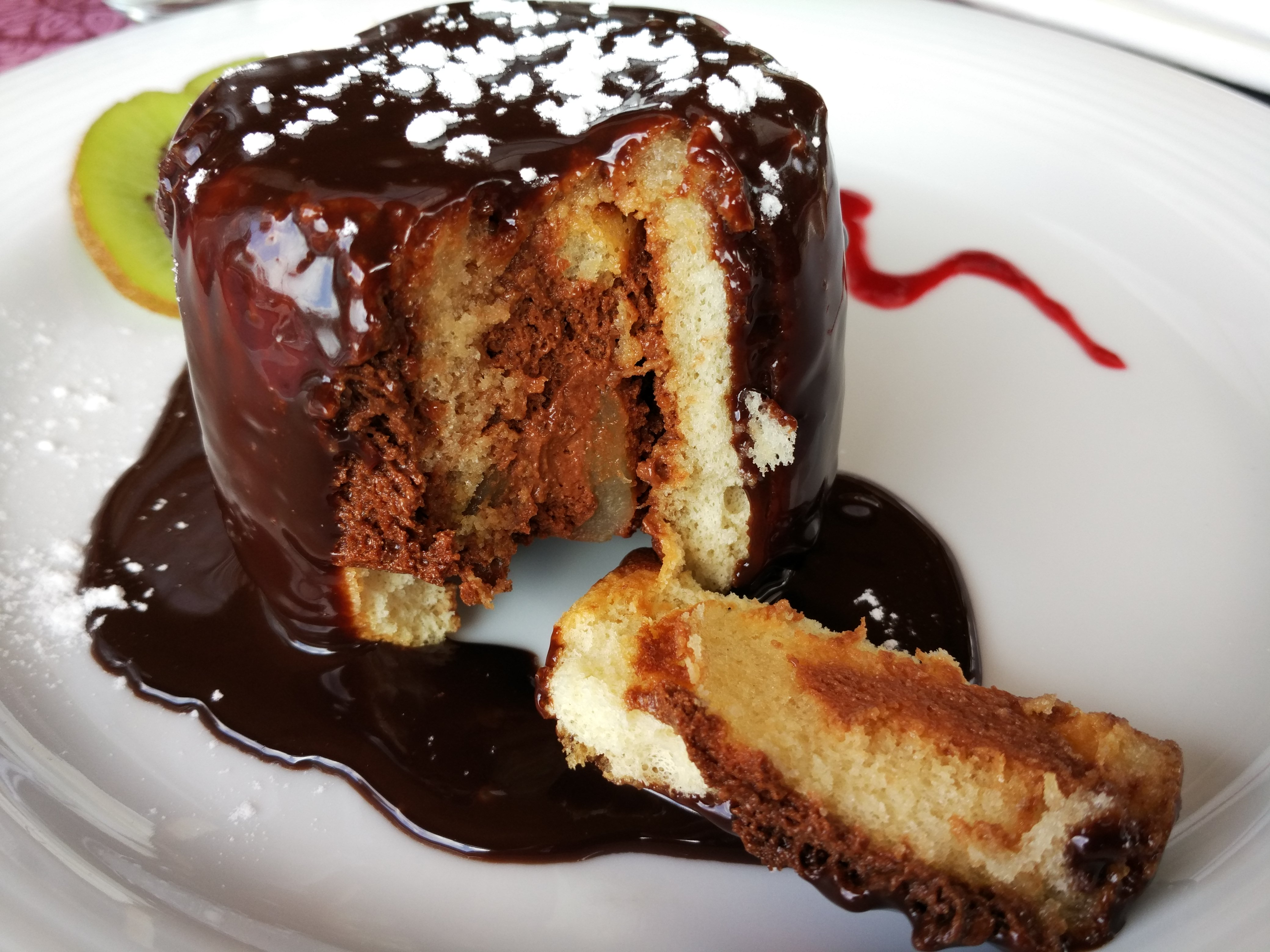
- Chocolate and pear charlotte, with the typical ladyfinger biscuits
- Alternative names: Icebox cake
- Course: Dessert
- Place of origin: England, France
- Serving temperature: Hot or cold
- Main ingredients: Bread, sponge cake or biscuits; fruit puree or custard
- Variations: Charlotte russe

A charlotte is a type of bread pudding that can be served hot or cold. It is also referred to as an "icebox cake". Bread, sponge cake, crumbs or biscuits/cookies are used to line a mold, which is then filled with a fruit puree or custard. The baked pudding could then be sprinkled with powdered sugar and glazed with a salamander, a red-hot iron plate attached to a long handle, though modern recipes would likely use more practical tools to achieve a similar effect.

The variant charlotte russe, also called charlotte parisienne, created by the French chef Antonin Carême, uses a mold lined with ladyfingers and filled with Bavarian cream.

Classically, stale bread dipped in butter was used as the lining, but sponge cake or ladyfingers may be used today. The filling may be covered with a thin layer of similarly flavoured gelatin.

== History and etymology ==
The pudding is known in England by the mid 18th century, and may be derived, a synonym for, or earlier known as the Pulpton of Apple, English recipes appearing in both Hannah Glasse's: " The Art of Cookery, made plain and easy" (1747), and in John Mollard’s "Art of cookery made easy and refined, comprising ample directions for preparing every article requisite for furnishing the tables of the nobleman, gentleman, and the tradesman" (1802). Mollard's cookbook uses both terms. Some have claimed that it was a tribute to Queen Charlotte (1744-1818), the wife of George III. An alternative explanation has it derived from the English word charlyt, meaning 'dish of custard filling'. An American poem dedicated to a charlotte was published in 1796, which included the lines:

The Charlotte brown, within whose crusty sides
A belly soft the pulpy apple hides;

— Joel Barlow, "The Hasty-Pudding", The New-York Magazine; or, Literary Repository

A recipe labelled a Charlotte appears in both John Simpson’s: "A Complete System of Cookery, on a Plan Entirely New" (1805), and some editions of Maria Rundell's: "New System of Domestic Cookery": Similarly in France a “Charlotte de pommes” appears in André Viard’s: "Le Cuisinier Impérial" (1806).

=== Historic Recipes ===
Pare some apples, take out the cores, and put them into a skillet: to a quart mugful heaped, put in a quarter of a pound of sugar, and two spoonfuls of water. Do them over a flow fire, keep them stirring, add a little cinnamon; when it is quite thick, and like a marmalade, let it stand till cool. Beat up the yolks of four or five eggs, and stir in a handful of grated bread and a quarter of a pound of fresh butter; then form it into what shape you please, and bake it in a slow oven, and then turn it upside-down on a plate for a second course.

— Hannah Glasse, "To make a Pupton of Apples.", The Art of Cookery Made Plain and Easy" (1747)

CHARLOTTE OF APPLES

Stew some apples with a bit of fresh butter, a little syrup of quinces, half a pound of apricot jam, and half a gill of brandy ; rub all through a hair-sieve, add a few dried cherries, and put into a mould lined with bread cut in diamonds of four inches square and half an inch thick, and previously dipped in oiled butter. Cover with slices of bread, likewise dipped in butter, bake of a light colour, and sift sugar over.

PULPTON OF APPLES

Pare, cut into quarters, and core eight good sized baking apples ; put them into a stewpan, add a bit of lemon-peel, and a table spoonful of rose water, cover the pan close, place it over a slow fire, and when the apples are tender, rub them through a hair-sieve ; then add to the pulp a small quantity of sifted cinnamon, cloves and sugar, four eggs well beaten, and a quarter of a pound of the crumb of French bread soaked in a gill of cream, and mix all the ingredients together. Rub the inside of a mould with fresh butter, fill it with the mixture, bake in a moderately heated oven, when done turn it out on a dish, and serve with sifted sugar over.

— John Mollard, "Charlotte of Apples and Pulpton of Apple", Art of cookery made easy and refined, comprising ample directions for preparing every article requisite for furnishing the tables of the nobleman, gentleman, and the tradesman (1802)

Butter the mould very well, and line it with bread cut thin, and about two inches wide, and in length the same depth as the mould ; dip the bread in warm clarified butter, I lay the bread one piece half over the other; then cut a piece the size of the bottom of the mould, dip it in butter, and put it in the mould; then brush the bread over with egg to make it stick together when baked ; then fill up the mould with a marmalade of apples, and cover it in with tart paste; put it in a slow oven for three quarters of an hour; then turn it out of the mould into a dish. N.B. The marmalade of apples is made as follows: peel the apples, and cut out the cores, put them on to boil in a little water, with a little cinnamon, a few cloves, and the peel of two lemons; when they are sufficiently broke, rub them through a hair sieve ; put the apples into a small preserving pan, with as much sifted lump-sugar as will make them sweet; give the apples about ten minutes boiling; keep a spoon in the preserving pan to stir them, and to keep the apples from sticking to the bottom; when the apples begin to get flat, squeeze lemon-juice in to make them sharp.

— John Simpson, "A Charlotte", Complete System of Cookery, on a Plan Entirely New (1805)

Cut as many very thin slices of white bread as will cover the bottom and line the sides of a baking dish, but first rub it thick with butter. Put apples, in thin slices, into the dish, in layers, till full, strewing sugar between, and bits of butter. In the mean time, soak as many thin slices of bread as will cover the whole, in warm milk, over which lay a plate, and a weight to keep the bread close on the apples. Bake slowly three hours. To a middling sized dish use half a pound of butter in the whole.

— Maria Rundell, "Charlotte", A New System of Domestic Cookery (1807)

=== Historic Variants ===
In 1815, Marie-Antoine Carême, the author of Le Pâtissier royal parisien, claims to have thought of charlotte à la parisienne "pendant mon établissement"., he mentions many varieties of charlotte: à la parisienne, à la française, à l'italienne, aux macarons d'avelines, aux gaufres aux pistaches, de pommes, de pomme d'api, d'abricots, de pêches, de pommes glacée aux abricots, de pommes au beurre, parisienne à la vanille, de pommes; he mentions à la russe as the name used by others for what he called à la parisienne. (Pomme d'api is a variety of apple available in the winter.)

== Types ==
There are many variants. The 2015 reference book The Oxford Companion to Sugar and Sweets compares cold charlottes to trifles and icebox (or refrigerator) cakes. BBC Food describes charlottes as "made in a mould lined with sponge fingers or bread slices and filled, then baked or, in the case of cold charlottes, set in the fridge. Apple charlotte is probably the best-known example."

Fruit charlottes usually combine a fruit purée or preserve, such as raspberry or pear, with a custard filling or whipped cream. Charlottes are not always made with fruit; some, notably charlotte russe, use custard or Bavarian cream, and a chocolate charlotte is made with layers of chocolate mousse filling.

The Algerian charlotte is made with honey, dates, orange rind, and almonds.

=== Charlotte russe ===
Charlotte russe or charlotte à la russe ('Russian') is a cold dessert of Bavarian cream (bavarois, a mixture of cooked custard and whipped cream) set in a mold lined with ladyfingers. It was named as such when it was fashionable to serve food with a Russian name, or in the Russian style (service à la russe).

Charlotte royale is made with the same filling as a charlotte russe, but the ladyfingers are replaced by slices of Swiss roll.

A simplified version of charlotte russe was a popular dessert or on-the-go treat sold in candy stores and luncheonettes in New York City, during the 1930s, 1940s, and 1950s. It consisted of a paper cup filled with yellow cake and whipped cream topped with half a maraschino cherry. The bottom of the cup is pushed up to eat.

The dessert that 19th-century Russians knew as sharlotka (also transliterated charlottka), a baked pudding with layers of brown bread and apple sauce, has since evolved into a simple dish of chopped apples baked in a sweet batter.

== See also ==
- Apple cake
- Applesauce cake
- Crema de fruta
- Crumble
- List of French desserts
- List of Russian desserts
- Summer pudding
- Tiramisu

== Sources ==
- Rinsky, Glenn; Rinsky, Laura Halpin (28 February 2008). The Pastry Chef's Companion: A Comprehensive Resource Guide for the Baking and Pastry Professional. John Wiley & Sons. ISBN 978-0-470-00955-0.
- Sinclair, Charles (October 2005). A Cook's Dictionary: International Food and Cooking Terms from A to Z. Bloomsbury Publishing Plc. ISBN 978-1-904970-18-7.
