= Calvary Cemetery (South Portland, Maine) =

Roman Catholic cemetery in Cumberland County, Maine

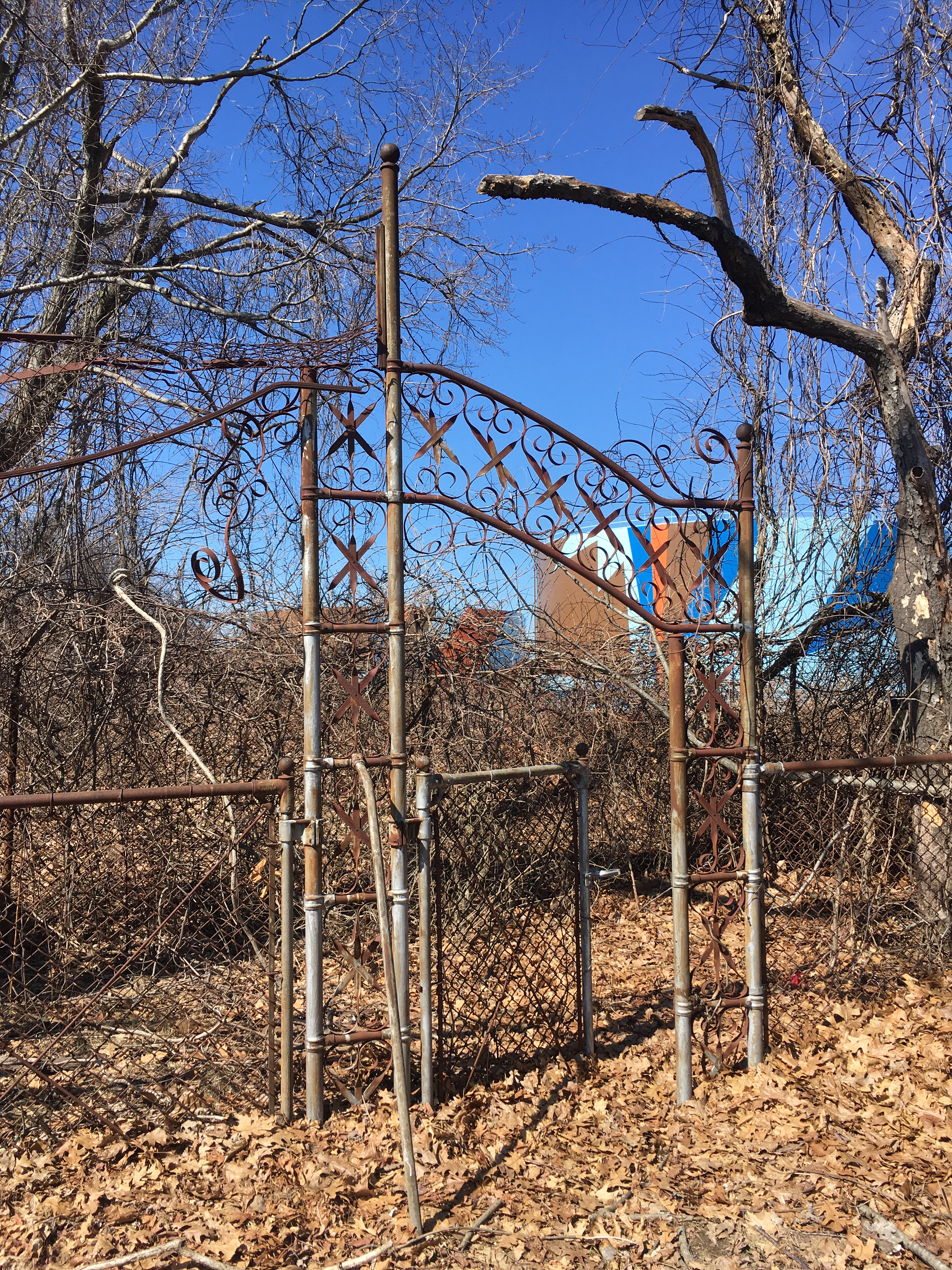
- Interactive map of Calvary Cemetery

Details
- Established: August 8, 1858
- Location: 1461 Broadway, South Portland, Maine
- Country: United States
- Coordinates: 43°38′03″N 70°17′34″W
- Owned by: Roman Catholic Diocese of Portland
- No. of graves: >46,000
- Website: Official website
- Find a Grave: Calvary Cemetery

Calvary Cemetery is a Roman Catholic cemetery in South Portland, Maine, United States. The original cemetery was dedicated and consecrated on August 8, 1858 in a ceremony led by Bishop David William Bacon. An extension of the existing cemetery, called New Calvary Cemetery, was consecrated on June 24, 1927.

== Notable interments ==
- Giovanni Amato (1875–1959), co-founder of Amato's
- John Anglin (1850–1905), Medal of Honor recipient
- Daniel Joseph Feeney (1894–1969), Roman Catholic Bishop
- James Augustine Healy (1830–1900), Roman Catholic Bishop
- Charles J. Loring Jr. (1918–1952), Medal of Honor recipient
- Kid Madden (1866–1896), professional baseball player
