= Maple custard pie =

Custard pie made with maple syrup

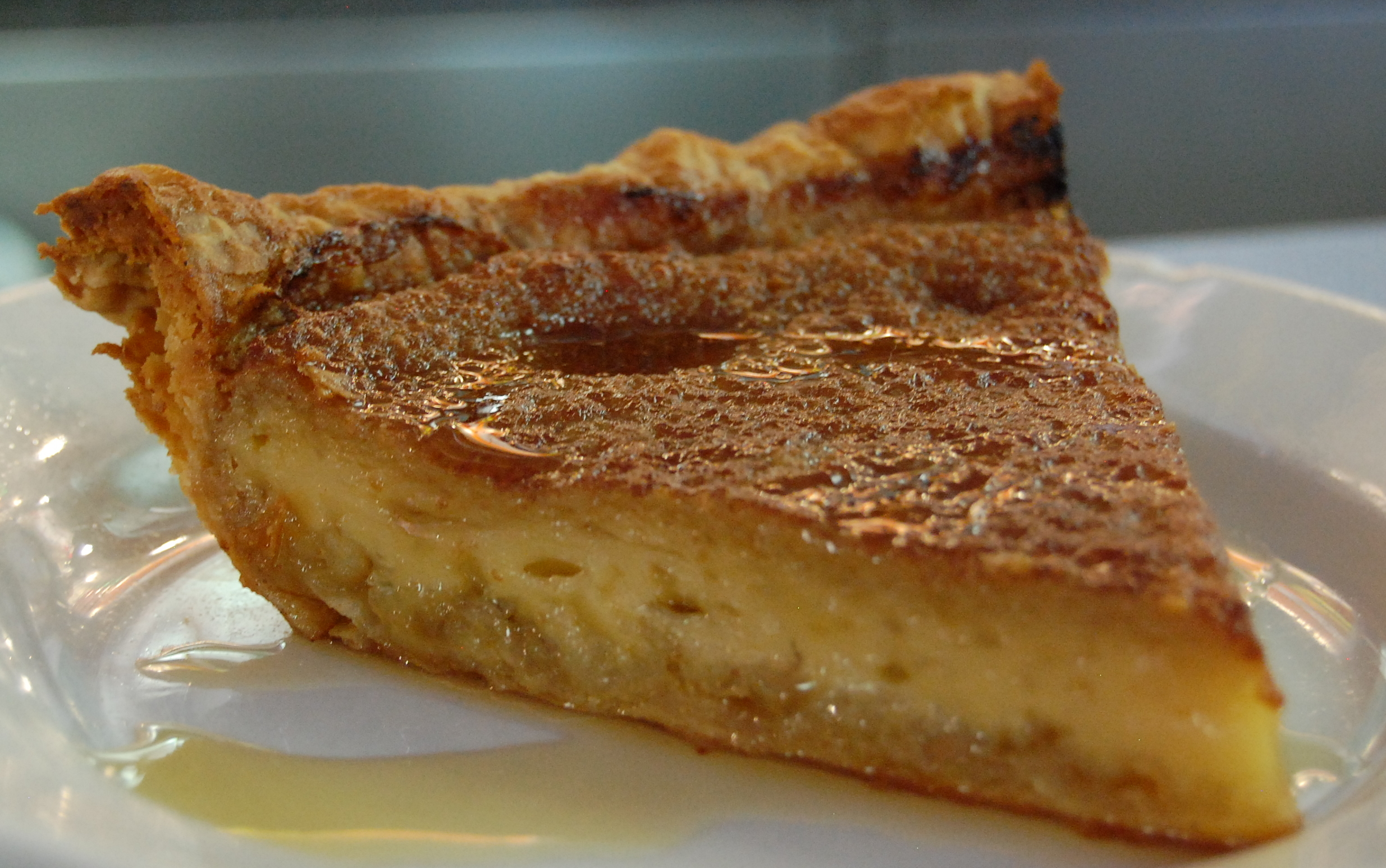
Maple custard pie from the cuisine of New England

Maple custard pie is a custard pie from the cuisine of New England. Maple custard pies are sweetened only with maple sugar. Each year in New England maple sugar is made with the sap collected from local trees, a New England tradition dating to the 18th-century boycott of sugar imports from the West Indies. Because sugar from the West Indies was produced with slave labor, the maple pie is recognized as a symbol of New England's values of self-sufficiency and economic independence. The tradition of making maple pies continues into the present day but is not as common as it once was.

== History ==
In anti-slavery New England William Fox and others advocated for the boycott of sugar from the West Indies to pressure slaveholders. Maple sugar became a substitute for cane sugar, first advanced by Benjamin Rush who published a tract on sugar maples in 1788, and soon after founded the Society for Promoting the Manufacture of Sugar from the Sugar Maple Tree.

Thomas Jefferson took up the cause, vowing to use "no other sugar in his family than that which is obtained from the sugar maple tree." He obtained 50 pounds of maple sugar from writing in 1790 to Benjamin Vaughan that high quality sugar would be obtained from local maples with "no other labor than what the women and girls can bestow ... What a blessing to substitute sugar which requires only the labour of children, for that which it is said renders the slavery of the blacks necessary," but Jefferson's maple grove did not take to the Virginia climate and all the trees died. The tradition of making maple pie, although not as common as it used to be, continues to symbolize New England values of a simple lifestyle and economic independence.

== Preparation ==
A 1939 recipe for maple cream pie is made with maple sugar and scalded milk in a double boiler. Cornstarch is added to the sweetened milk to make a thin paste which is poured over beaten eggs, then cooked all together for one minute. Butter, vanilla and salt are stirred in. The maple custard is cooled and poured into the pie shell, served topped with whipped cream. Some versions are baked in the oven.

== See also ==
- Sugar cream pie
