= The New-York Magazine =

Monthly literary magazine (1790–1797)

The New-York Magazine; or, Literary Repository
- Categories: Literary magazine
- Frequency: Monthly
- Publisher: Thomas and James Swords
- First issue: January 1790
- Final issue: December 1797
- Country: United States
- Based in: New York City
- Language: English
- OCLC: 2413653

The New-York Magazine; or, Literary Repository was a monthly literary magazine published in New York City from 1790 to 1797, and claimed as one of the four most important magazines of its time. One of the longest-running magazines of that era (it published almost 100 issues), it focused on theater and travel writing and also essays, poems, and short stories.

The magazine was founded by Thomas and James Swords, who published, printed, and probably edited it. Some of the writers came from "The Friendly Club", a literary society, and included William Dunlap (author of the theater column) and Elihu Hubbard Smith, besides beginning and established authors such as Charles Brockden Brown and Joel Barlow, whose The Hasty-Pudding was published by the magazine in 1796.

Illustrated with costly copperplate engravings, its subscribers included George Washington, John Adams, John Jay, and Richard Varick.
