= The Hasty-Pudding =

Mock-heroic poem by Joel Barlow

The Hasty-Pudding is a mock-heroic poem by Joel Barlow. First published in 1796 in The New-York Magazine, it is now commonly anthologized.

The poem, on the literal level, celebrates the simple life exemplified in the new America by hasty pudding (or cornmeal mush). In three cantos (the principal division known from epic and heroic poetry) he celebrates the mythical origin of corn, its production, and its consumption within the homely setting of the American farmer. That there are different levels of reading the poem is made clear by its many allusions to contemporary political, philosophical, and religious writers, and by the position of the narrator. According to Leo Lemay, Barlow's poem "concerns literature, mythology, politics, and culture":

- Like Alexander Pope in An Essay on Criticism, Barlow argues that an Age of Poetry can be discerned in the "ancient traditions" of country folk, and the poem's language of taste (the taste and consumption of hasty pudding) reflects a critique of (artificial) eighteenth-century standards set by literary critics;
- The speaker is a kind of Manco Cápac, a sun god of the Incas (and Lemay argues he is a Wandering Jew as well), and the poem throughout celebrates the growth and consumption of corn and mush as belonging to sacred ritual;
- The praise of simple food is a critique of the life of civilized luxury belonging to an aristocracy which Barlow, a lifelong democrat and student of the French Revolution, abhorred, and is aimed squarely at such authors as Edmund Burke, to whose Reflections on the Revolution in France (1790) Barlow wrote a two-part reply critical of Burke's denigrating comments toward the "swinish multitude". Barlow argues, in the first part of his Advice to the Privileged Orders (1792), that "the state is the responsible agent of all men rather than of the privileged class"; Burke's "swinish multitude" (i.e., the common man) is rephrased by Barlow (in satirical fashion) as "pampered pigs", a denigrating term used by "gaudy prigs" (ll. 113–14);
- References to American culture are made throughout: the poem contains "an early, sustained use and praise of folklore and folk customs" with context provided by, among others, the writings of "Homespun" (that is, Benjamin Franklin), popular songs such as "Yankee Doodle", the Ossian cycle, and William Collins's poems on popular superstition.
