= Needham (food) =

American confection

- Type: Confection
- Place of origin: United States
- Region or state: Maine
- Main ingredients: Sugar, chocolate, coconut, potato

A needham is a confectionery dessert bar made from sugar, chocolate, coconut, and potato. It is chiefly associated with the U.S. state of Maine.

The needham became a common dessert in Maine in the late 19th century, and is believed by scholars to have originated from an evangelist named George Carter Needham, who came to America from southern Ireland and became well known for his preaching and writing. A candy manufacturer named Seavey named a new dessert he had just begun marketing after the preacher in the early 1870s. The needham includes as its distinctive ingredient the potato, a food cultivated in Maine, especially in Aroostook County. The taste is similar to the commercial Mounds bar. The needham is not widely available outside of northern New England.
