= Beach pizza =

Style of pizza local to coastal northern New England

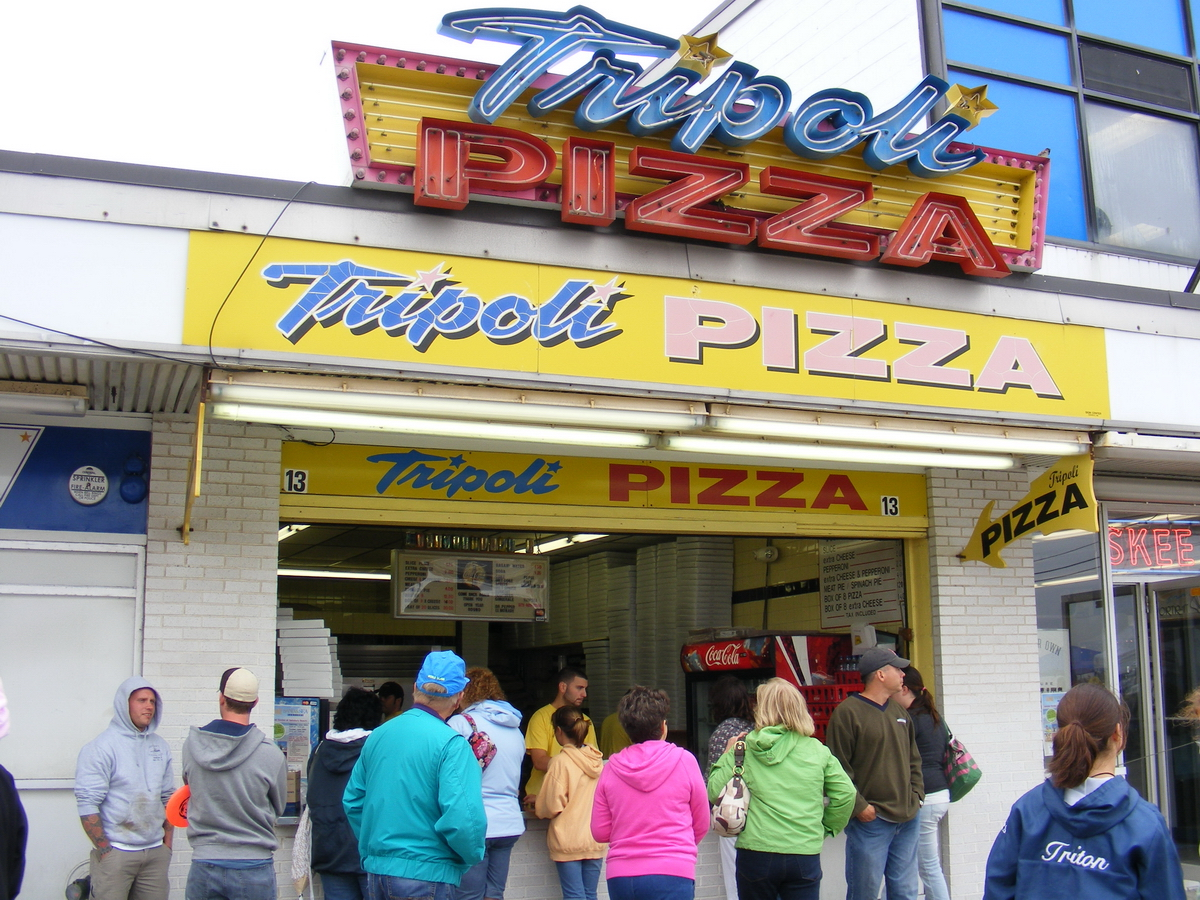
- A beach pizza destination in Salisbury, Massachusetts
- Alternative names: New England beach pizza
- Type: Pizza
- Place of origin: United States
- Region or state: New England
- Created by: Tripoli Bakery in Lawrence, Massachusetts
- Main ingredients: Pizza dough, shredded cheese, tomato sauce, provolone slices

Beach pizza is a style of pizza popular in the coastal communities of New England north of Boston, particularly in northeastern Massachusetts and coastal New Hampshire.

The pizza has a very thin crust and is rectangular, being typically cooked on a baking sheet. The crust is topped with a noticeably sweet tomato sauce, a sprinkling of mozzarella cheese, and, traditionally, can include slices of provolone cheese (usually the delicatessen form typically used in sandwiches).

== History ==
Beach pizza was invented in 1944 at Tripoli Bakery in Lawrence, Massachusetts, a mill city along the Merrimack River in the Merrimack Valley, approximately twenty miles west of the Atlantic Ocean.
