= Maine Italian sandwich =

Italian-American submarine sandwich

The Maine Italian sandwich, also called Amato's Italian (after its namesake), is a submarine sandwich in Italian-American cuisine. The Maine Italian sandwich was invented in Portland, Maine. It is similar to, but distinct from, other types of sandwiches called "Italians" and is closely associated with the Amato's sandwich shop chain, though it is found widely throughout the state. The sandwich is named for the Italian-American community in Portland and not for its ingredients. "Italian" sandwiches have been referred to as "a part of people's lives" in Maine.

== History ==
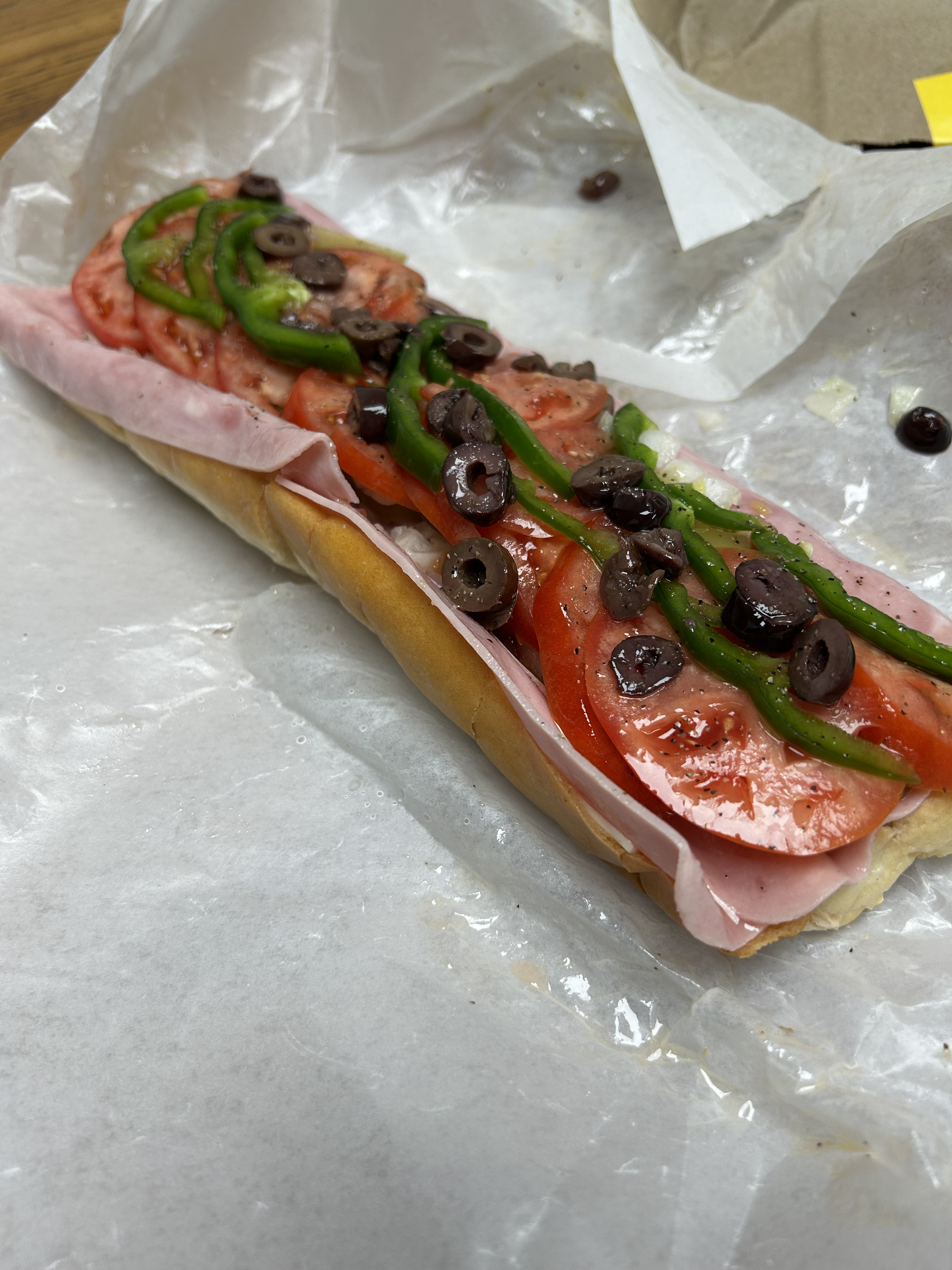
A Maine Italian sandwich from Amato's.

According to Amato family history, Giovanni and Michillina Amato, grocers in Portland, Maine, began selling "Italian" bread to dockworkers in 1902. By 1910 they had invented the "Italian sandwich" by adding cheese, ham and vegetables to the bread. The Amatos later opened a sandwich shop named Amato's, and today the sandwich continues to be prepared by Amato's sandwich shops. The Amato's version is traditionally prepared using fresh-baked bread, ham, American cheese, slices of tomato, onions, green pepper and sour pickle, Kalamata olives and salad oil.

Many other Italian corner markets in Portland sold Italians. In the 1960s, Portland reportedly had an "Italian" sandwich shop "every couple of blocks". In the 1970s and 1980s, "Italian" sandwich shops added vegetarian versions of the sandwich without the ham. Monte's Fine Food in Portland was the first Italian shop to add a vegan "Italian" to the menu in 2019. In 2025, Botto's Bakery in Westbrook was supplying "Italian" sandwich rolls to more than 40 shops in southern Maine.

== Preparation ==
The Maine Italian sandwich is prepared using a long bread roll or bun with cured meats such as ham along with American or provolone cheese, tomato, onion, green bell pepper, sliced sour pickles, Greek olives, olive oil or salad oil, salt and black pepper.

Veggie Italians are made with American or provolone cheese, tomato, onion, green bell pepper, sliced sour pickles and kalamata olives. Sometimes lettuce is added to Veggie Italians. Vegan Italians are made with vegan cheese, vegan ham, tomato, onion, green bell pepper, sliced sour pickles and kalamata olives.

=== Comparison with other "Italian" sandwiches ===
The Maine Italian is usually served on a long soft roll similar to a New England–style hot dog bun (also invented in Maine). It usually has a single cured meat—ham is the most common, though other cured meats can be found as well. By contrast, "Italian" sandwiches elsewhere often include cured meats such as capocollo, Genoa salami and mortadella. The Boston variant of the "Italian" sandwich is typically prepared on spuccadella and was historically called "spuckie", though the use of this term is in decline. This comes from the distinction in the sandwich's name: the Maine Italian is so-named because it was commonly eaten by Italian immigrants, not because the sandwich contains Italian flavors or ingredients.

== See also ==
- List of sandwiches
- Submarine sandwich
- Cuisine of Portland, Maine
- Cuisine of New England
