= Amato's =

New England sandwich shop chain

Amato's Sandwich Shops, Inc.

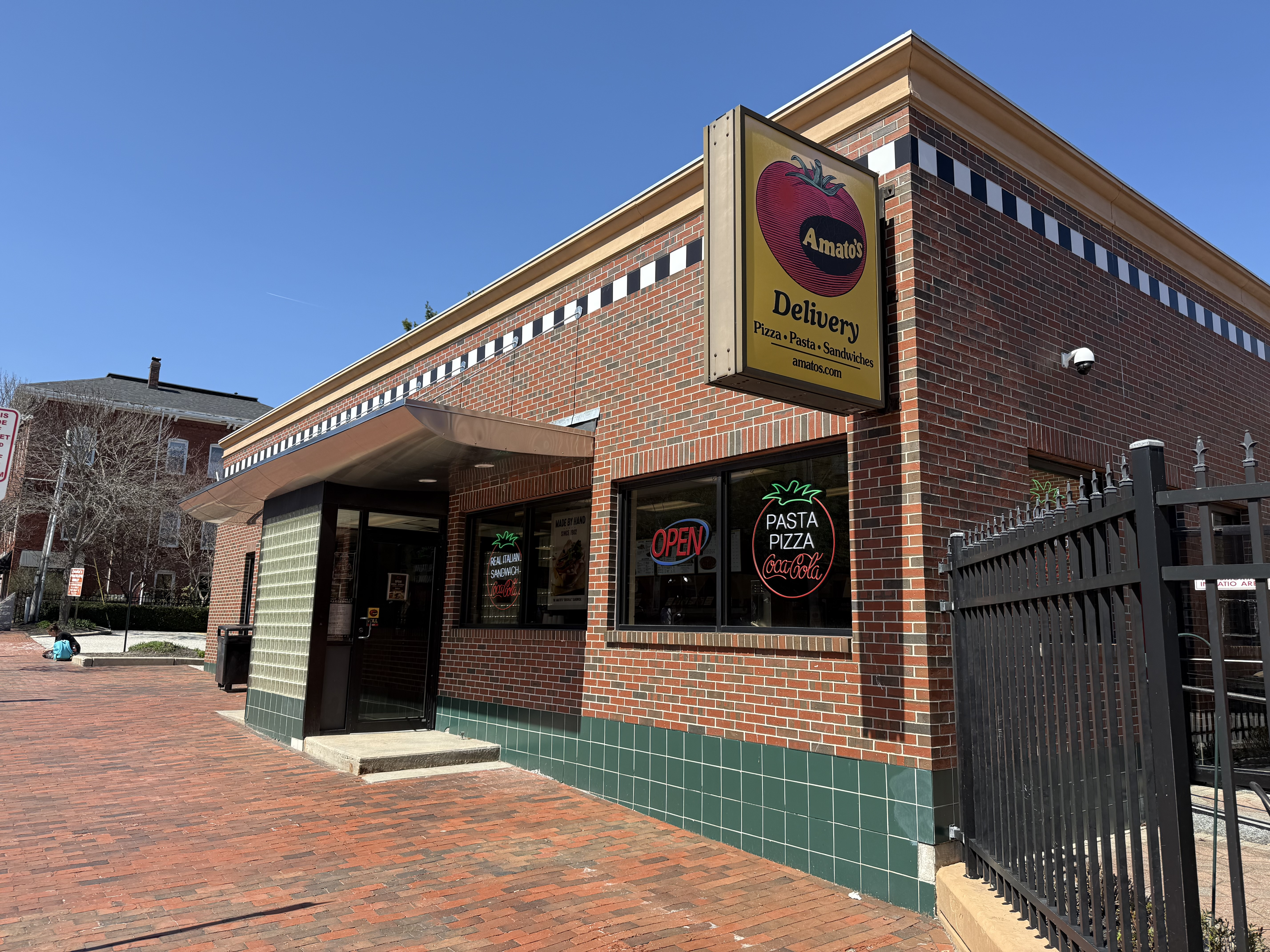
- The flagship store on India Street (2025)
- Company type: Private company corporation
- Industry: Foodservice, Fast food Franchising
- Founded: 1902 (124 years ago)
- Headquarters: Portland, Maine, United States
- Key people: Giovanni Amato (founder), Dominic Reali (president), Pasquale Troiano (CEO)
- Products: "Italian sandwich", pizza, pasta, salad
- Website: www.amatos.com

Amato's Sandwich Shops, Inc., is a chain of Italian restaurants that serves sandwiches, pizza and pasta throughout northern New England, United States. It is best known for its Maine Italian sandwich. About half of these are located throughout their home state of Maine. The chain also has a strong presence in Vermont, and there are a handful of other locations within New Hampshire. Additionally, a number of locations are located inside of Nouria gas stations in Massachusetts. Giovanni Amato named his sandwiches "Italians" in honor of his homeland.

== History ==
In 1902, Naples native Giovanni Amato and his wife, Michelina, opened a store on India Street in Portland, Maine. According to official literature, Amato's sandwiches contained ham, American cheese, and fresh vegetables, which the Italian immigrants along the waterfront seemed to enjoy. Amato named his sandwich the "Italian" in honor of his country and his people. Today, there are 40 locations operating under the Amato's brand. Dominic Reali, who purchased the business from the Amato family in 1972, also added Greek olives, sour pickles, and his own oil (a blend of olive and vegetable oil) to the famous Real Italian.

== See also ==
- Portland, Maine cuisine
