= Hasty pudding =

Type of pudding or porridge

Hasty pudding is a pudding or porridge of grains cooked in milk or water. In the United States, it often refers specifically to a version made primarily with ground ("Indian") corn. It is mentioned in the lyrics of "Yankee Doodle", a traditional American song of the 18th century.

== Terminology ==
Since at least the 16th century, a dish called hasty pudding has been found in British cuisine. It is made of wheat flour that has been cooked in boiling milk or water until it reaches the consistency of a thick batter or an oatmeal porridge. It was a staple dish for the English for centuries. The earliest known recipes for hasty pudding date to the 17th century. There are three examples in Robert May's The Accomplisht Cook. The first is made with flour, cream, raisins, currants and butter, the second recipe is for a boiled pudding and the third includes grated bread, eggs and sugar.

Hasty pudding was used by Hannah Glasse as a term for batter or oatmeal porridge in The Art of Cookery (1747). It is also mentioned in Samuel Johnson's Dictionary of 1755 as a combination of either milk and flour or oatmeal and water. The recipe is also found in The Compleat Housewife where it is made with grated penny loaf, cream, egg yolks, sack (or orange blossom water) and sugar.

== American cuisine ==
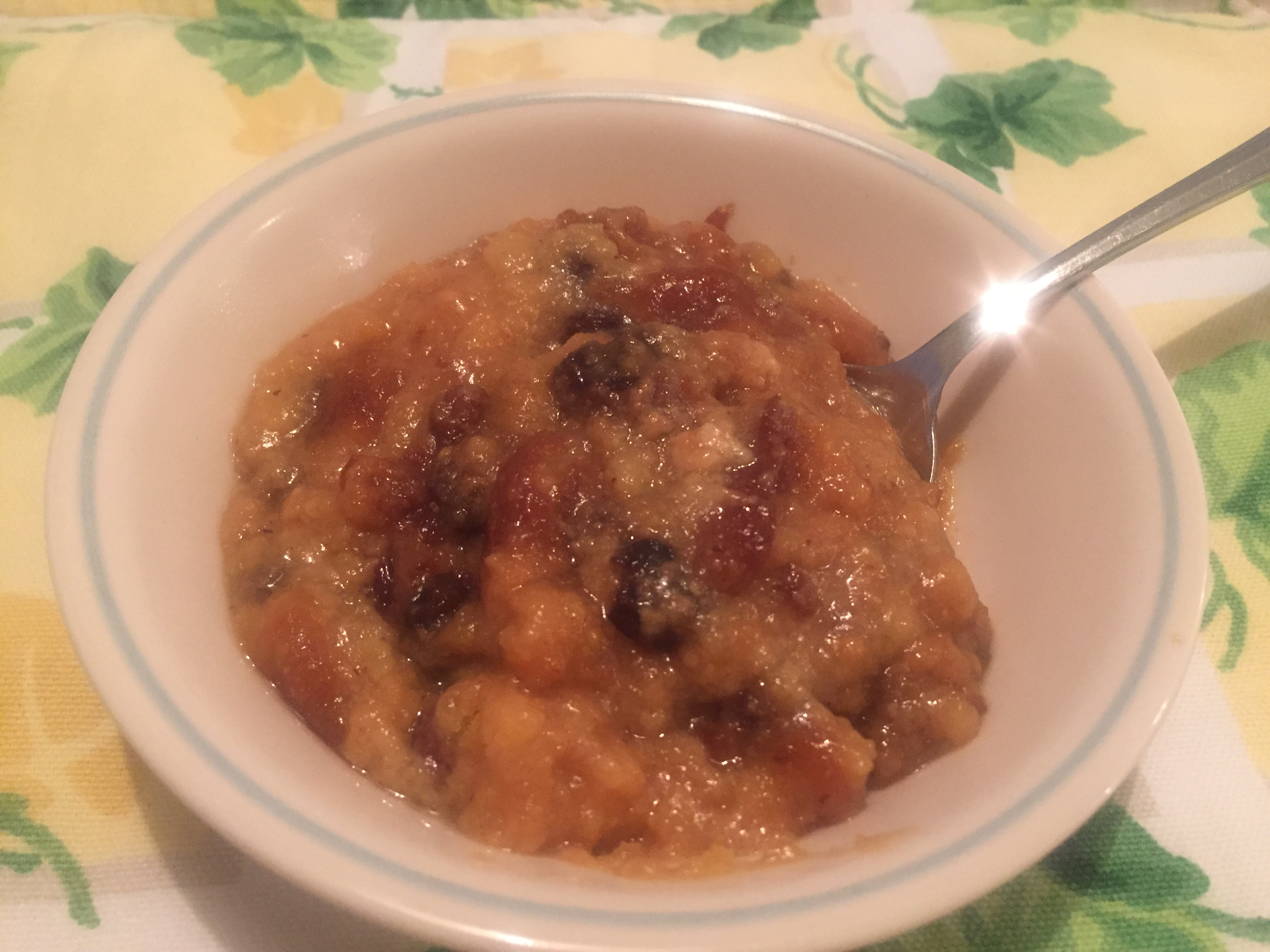
Indian pudding

Indian pudding is a traditional American dessert, "a cold-weather classic" in the cuisine of New England. It was commonplace in the colonial era and enjoyed a revival as part of Thanksgiving Day celebrations in the late 19th century. It was found in most American cookbooks before 1900. The 20th century's commercial puddings with their industrially perfect smooth consistency displaced Indian pudding, and its cooking time had little appeal for the modern home cook. It is still associated with autumn holidays and occasionally revived by restaurants. It is usually served warm and sometimes accompanied by vanilla ice cream or whipped cream.

=== Colonial United States ===
17th-century English colonists brought hasty pudding to North America and transformed it completely. Lacking wheat, they substituted cornmeal, a grain they learned to cultivate from the indigenous peoples, which led to the new name Indian pudding, derived from their name for cornmeal, Indian meal. They substituted milk, which was plentiful, for water and added locally available sweeteners, either molasses or maple syrup, and spices when available, typically cinnamon and ground ginger. Other traditional ingredients include butter and eggs for a smoother consistency and raisins and nuts for flavor and contrasting texture. Finally, Indian pudding was baked in a slow oven for several hours, transforming its texture from the porridge-like quality of hasty pudding to a smoother texture more typical of custard puddings. According to Kathleen Wall, Plimoth Plantation's expert on colonial cooking, "The longer it cooks, the more liquid the gritty cornmeal absorbs, and the more it absorbs, the smoother the texture of your pudding."

In 1643 Roger Williams called the dish "nasaump":

Nasaump, a kind of meale pottage, unpartch'd. From this the English call their samp, which is the Indian corne, beaten and boild, and eaten hot or cold, with milke or butter, which are mercies beyond the Natives plaine water, and which is a dish exceeding wholesome for the English bodies.

A modern version of this process could be seen in the dish known outside the Southern US as Southern grits, made from hominy. Hominy is made through a process called nixtamalization in which maize, a form of corn that has thicker ovary walls and a wider kernel than sweet corn. Maize is usually broken down by an alkaline substance, most commonly limewater, to pull out nutrients and increases its overall nutritional value, allows the product to be more easily ground, and improves the flavor and smell of the corn. In the common US vernacular, sweet corn is referred to as the default moniker of "corn", and also does not need such an alkaline processing, as is the case with this form of maize. The words maize and corn are often, but not always, used interchangeably, hence the vast differences between processed and unprocessed versions of corn kernels mentioned above.

=== Early 19th century ===
Eliza Leslie, an influential American cookbook author of the early 19th century, includes a recipe for flour hasty pudding in her 1840 Directions for Cookery, in Its Various Branches, and calls the corn type "Indian mush". She calls an oatmeal version burgoo. She stresses the need for slow cooking rather than haste, and also recommends the use of a special mush-stick for stirring to prevent lumps. (This mush-stick is perhaps related to the spurtle, or the pudding stick of the nursery rhyme beating.)

Catherine Beecher's recipe:

Wet up the Indian meal in cold water, till there are no lumps, stir it gradually into boiling water which has been salted, till so thick that the stick will stand in it. Boil slowly, and so as not to burn, stirring often. Two or three hours' boiling is needed. Pour it into a broad, deep dish, let it grow cold, cut it into slices half an inch thick, flour them, and fry them on a griddle with a little lard, or bake them in a stone oven.

== "Yankee Doodle" and other literary references ==
Hasty pudding is referred to in a verse of the early American song "Yankee Doodle":

Fath'r and I went down to camp
Along with Captain Goodin',
And there we saw the men and boys
As thick as hasty puddin'.

It is also referenced in Louisa May Alcott's Little Men (1871): "on their garden plot, Emil and Franz devoted themselves to corn, and had a jolly little husking in the barn, after which they took their corn to the mill, and came proudly home with meal enough to supply the family with hasty pudding and Johnny cake for a long time."

== Similar dishes ==
In the recipe for the Brazilian pudding curau (Portuguese pronunciation: [kuˈɾaw]), sweet corn grains are taken raw together with milk and most often coconut milk to a blender until uniformly liquid; cinnamon powder is sprinkled at the end. When boiled wrapped in corn husks is called pamonha..

Polenta is the savory Italian version of hasty pudding, with maize/corn substituted for the wheat originally used by the Romans.

American hasty pudding is very similar to grits, although grits can be made sweet or savory.

== See also ==
- List of puddings
- List of maize dishes
- List of porridges
- Samp
