= List of American desserts =

This is a list of desserts encountered in the cuisine of the United States.

== A ==
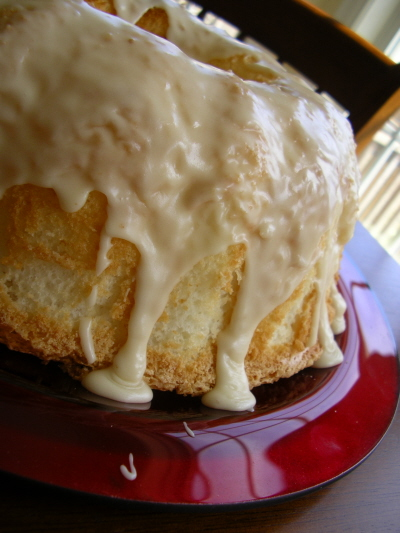
Angel food cake is a light, airy cake that originated in the United States.

- Angel food cake
- Apple crisp
- Apple dumpling
- Apple pie
- Alaskan ice cream

== B ==
- Banana split
- Bananas Foster
- Banana pudding
- Bean pie
- Bear claw
- Black and white cookies
- Black bottom pie
- Blackberry pie
- Blackout cake
- Blondie
- Blueberry pie
- Boston cream doughnut
- Boston cream pie
- Butter mochi
- Bumbleberry pie
- Buttermilk pie
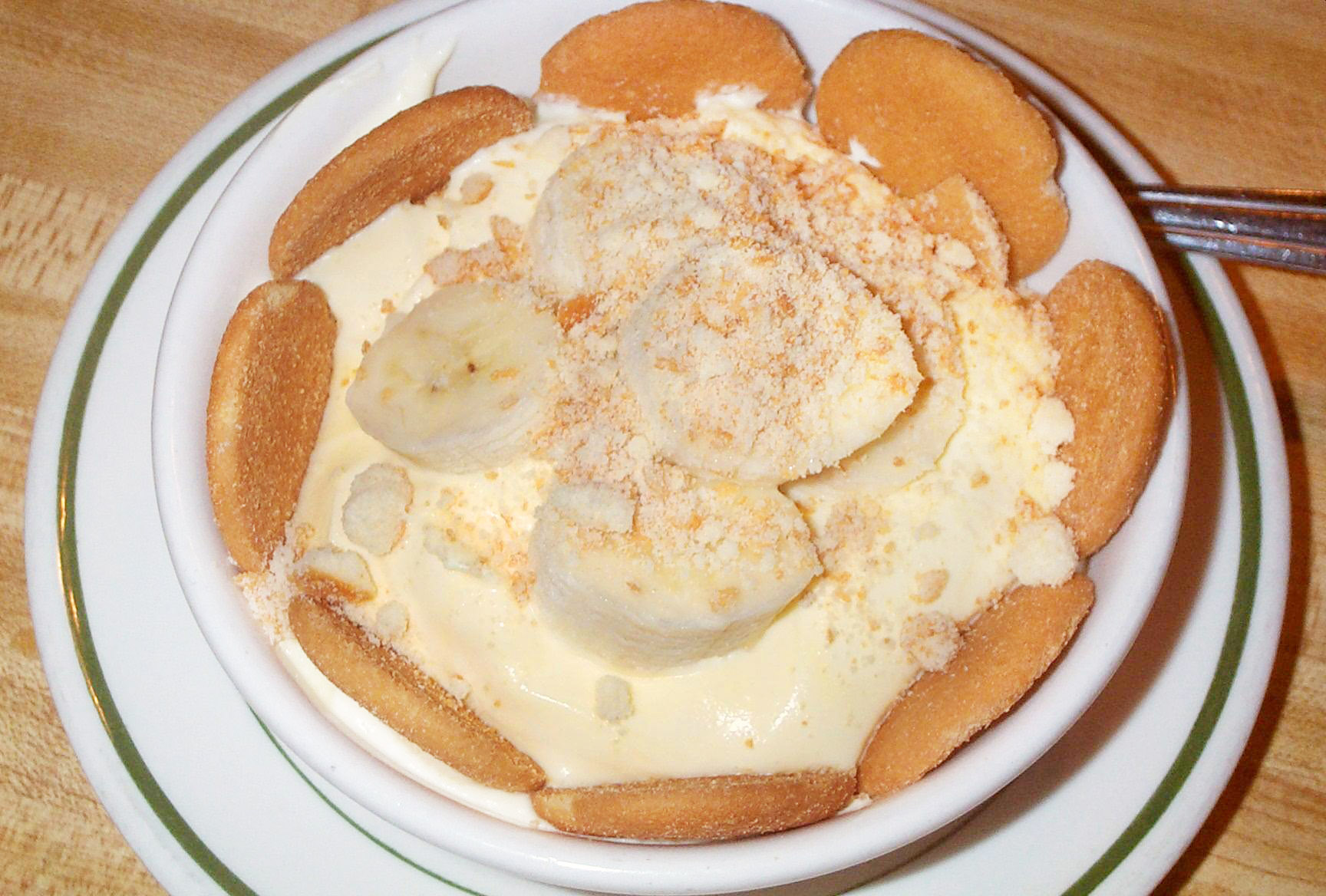
Banana pudding is prepared with vanilla flavored custard, cookies and sliced fresh bananas, topped with whipped cream or meringue.

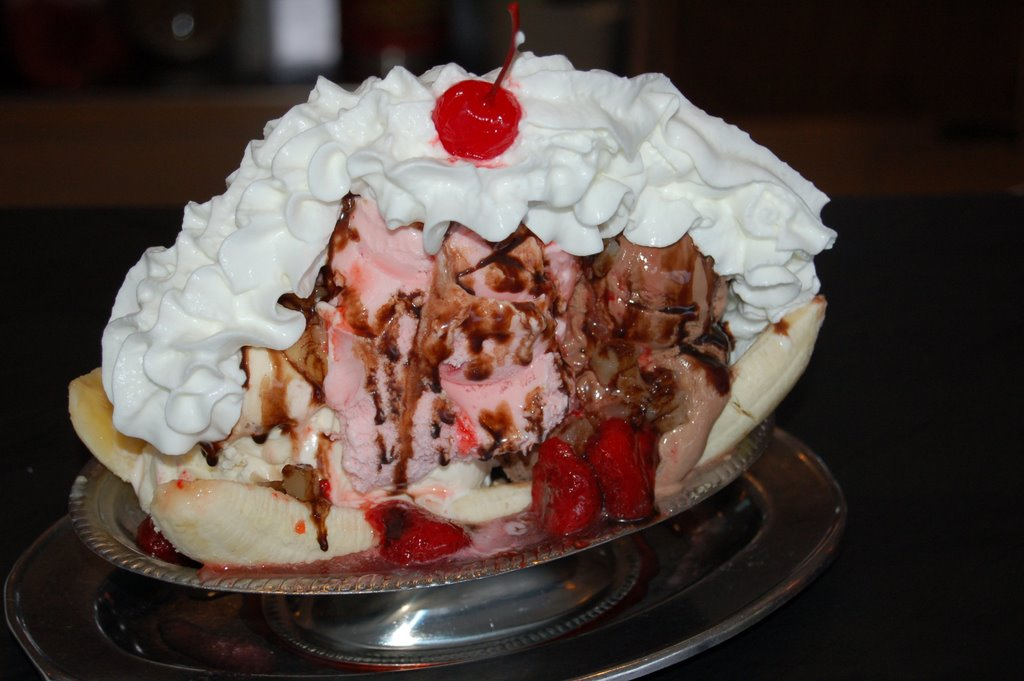
A traditional banana split, as served at Cabot's Ice Cream and Restaurant in Newtonville, Massachusetts

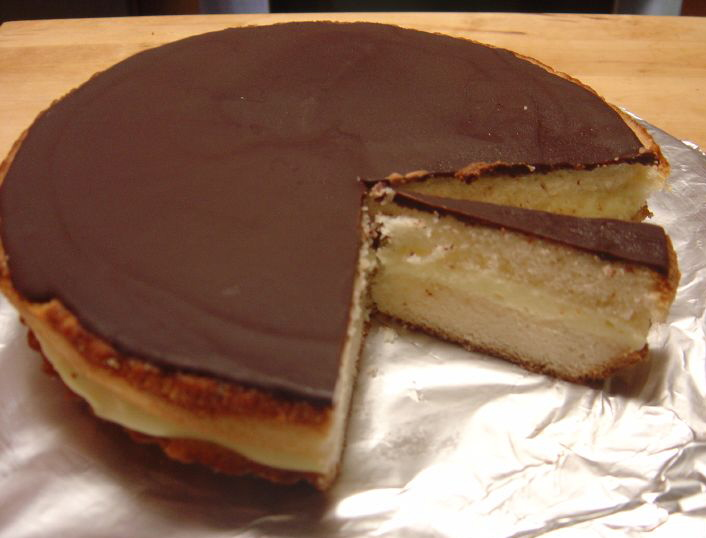
Boston cream pie is a cake that is filled with a custard or cream filling and frosted with chocolate.

== C ==
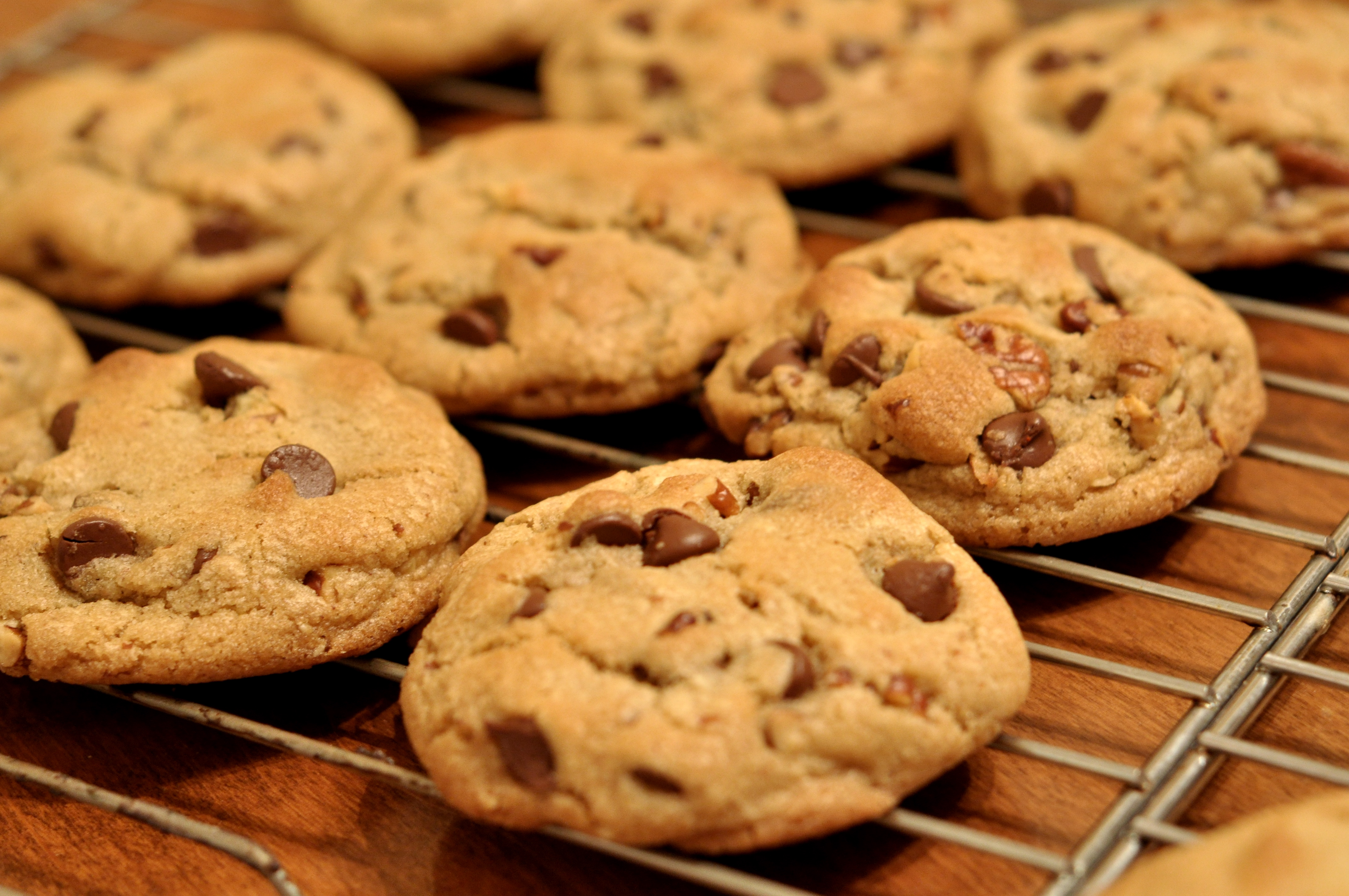
The chocolate chip cookie is a drop cookie that originated in the United States and features chocolate chips as its distinguishing ingredient.

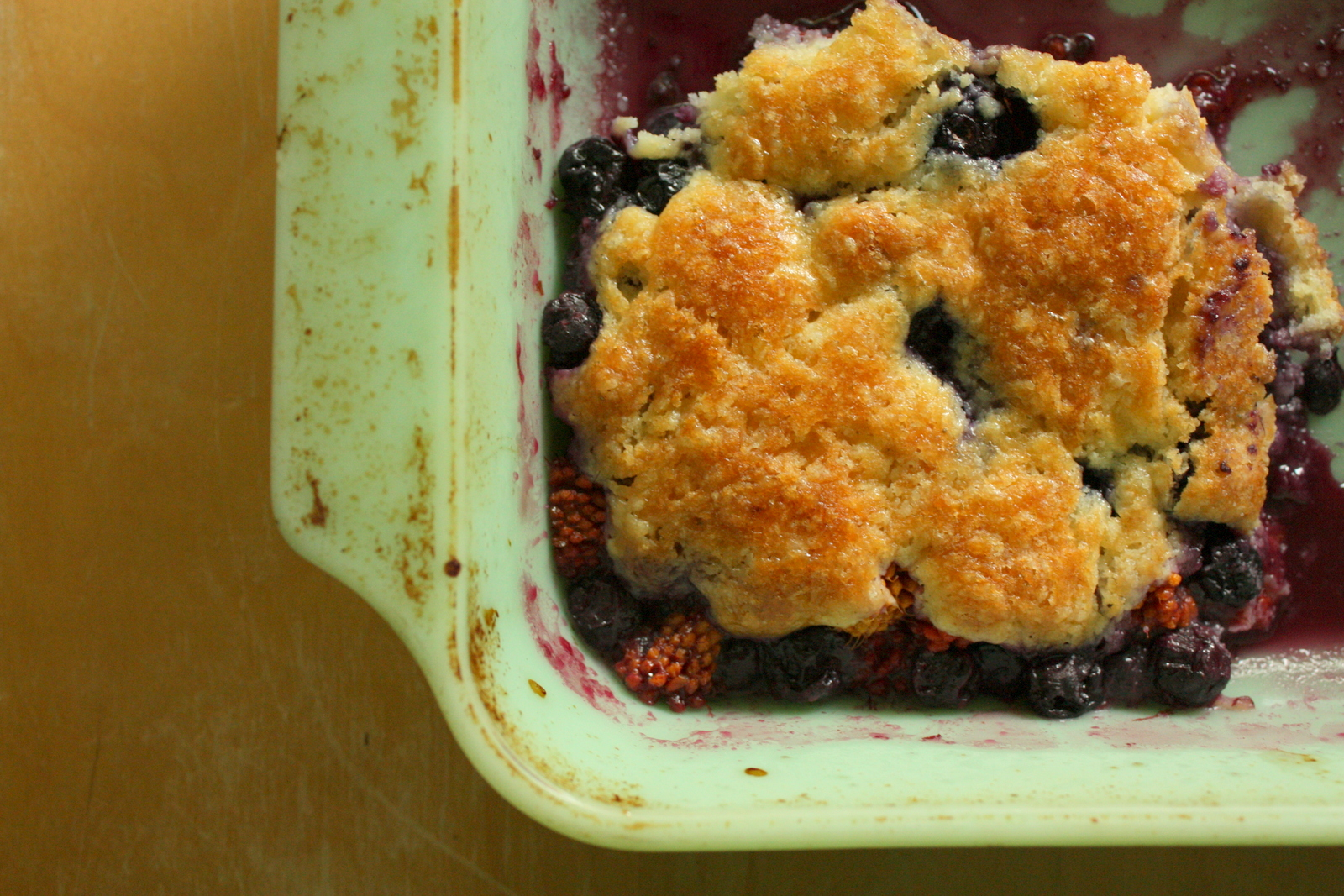
A portion of berry cobbler

- Checkerboard cake
- Cheesecake
- Cherry pie
- Chess pie
- Chiffon pie
- Chips Ahoy!
- Chocodile Twinkie
- Chocolate brownie
- Chocolate cake
- Chocolate chip cookie
- Chocolate pudding
- Chocolate-covered bacon
- Chocolate-covered fruit
- Chocolate-covered potato chips
- Cinnamon rolls
- Cobbler
- Coconut cake
- Cookie salad
- Corn cookie
- Cream pie
- Cube toast
- Cupcake

== D ==
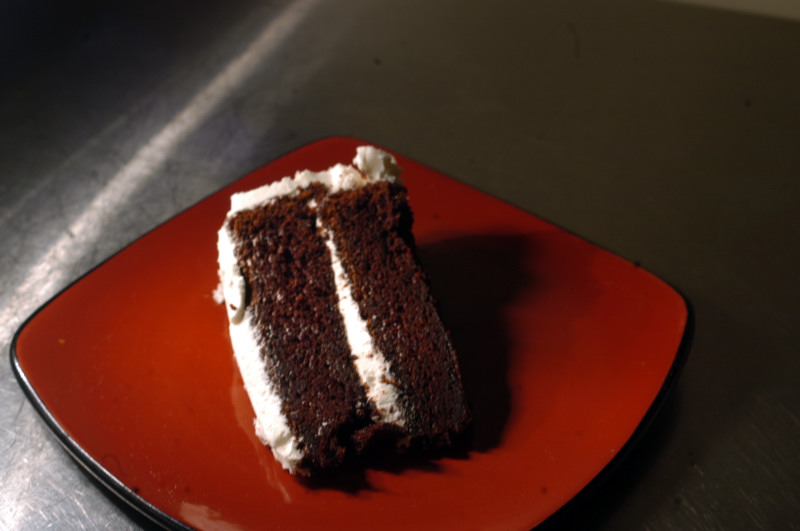
Devil's food cake is a moist, rich chocolate layer cake.

- Derby pie
- Dessert bar
- Devil's food cake
- Ding Dong
- Dirt cake
- Doberge cake
- Doughnut (also spelled "donut")

== F ==
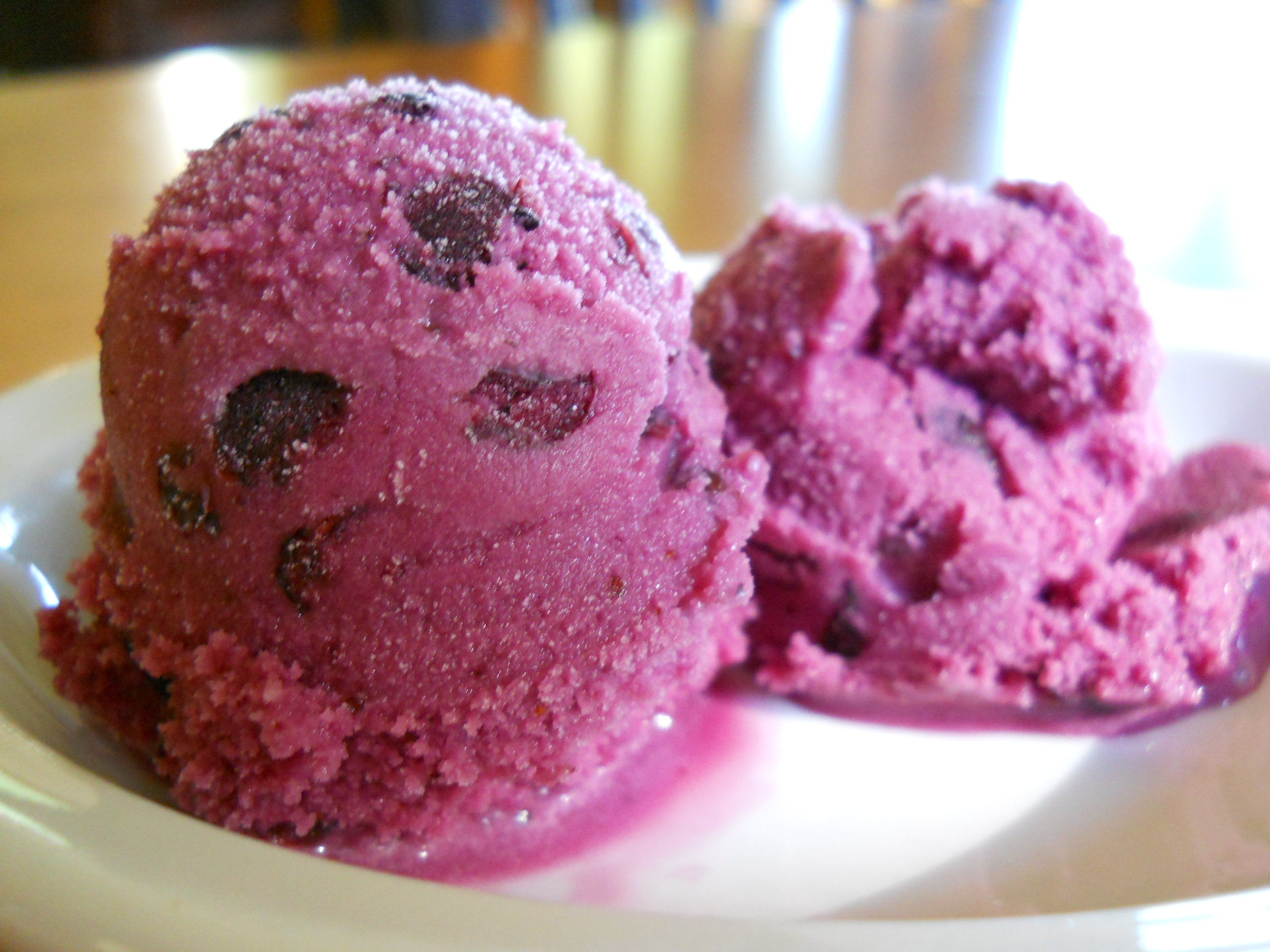
Blueberry frozen yogurt

- Fried dough
- Fried ice cream
- Fried pie
- Frozen yogurt
- Fruit pizza
- Fudge cake
- Fudge Rounds
- Funnel cake
- Fruit cake
- Fruit tart
- Fudge brownies
- Fruit Sorbet
- Flan

== G ==
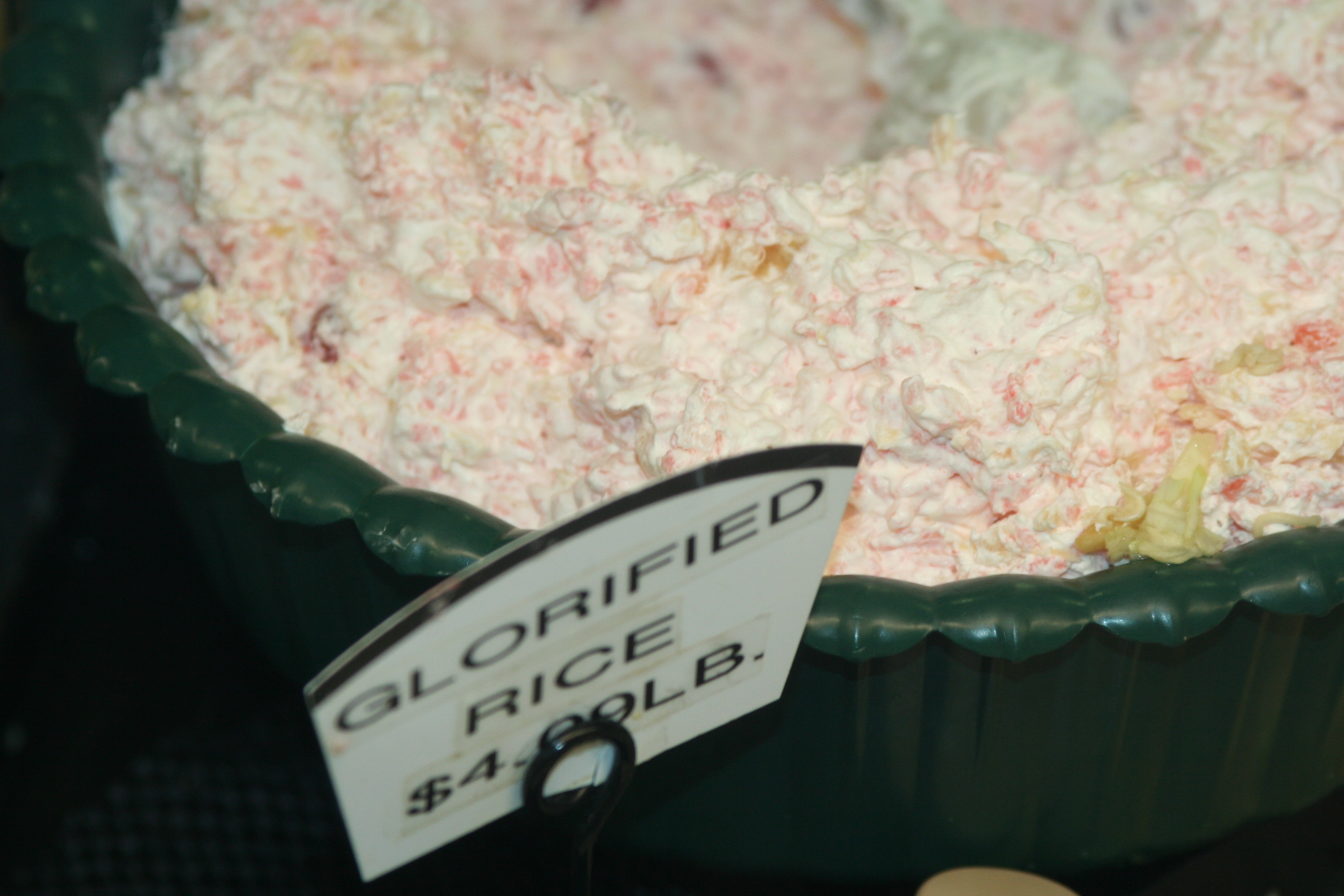
Glorified rice is a dessert salad served in Minnesota and other states in the Upper Midwest

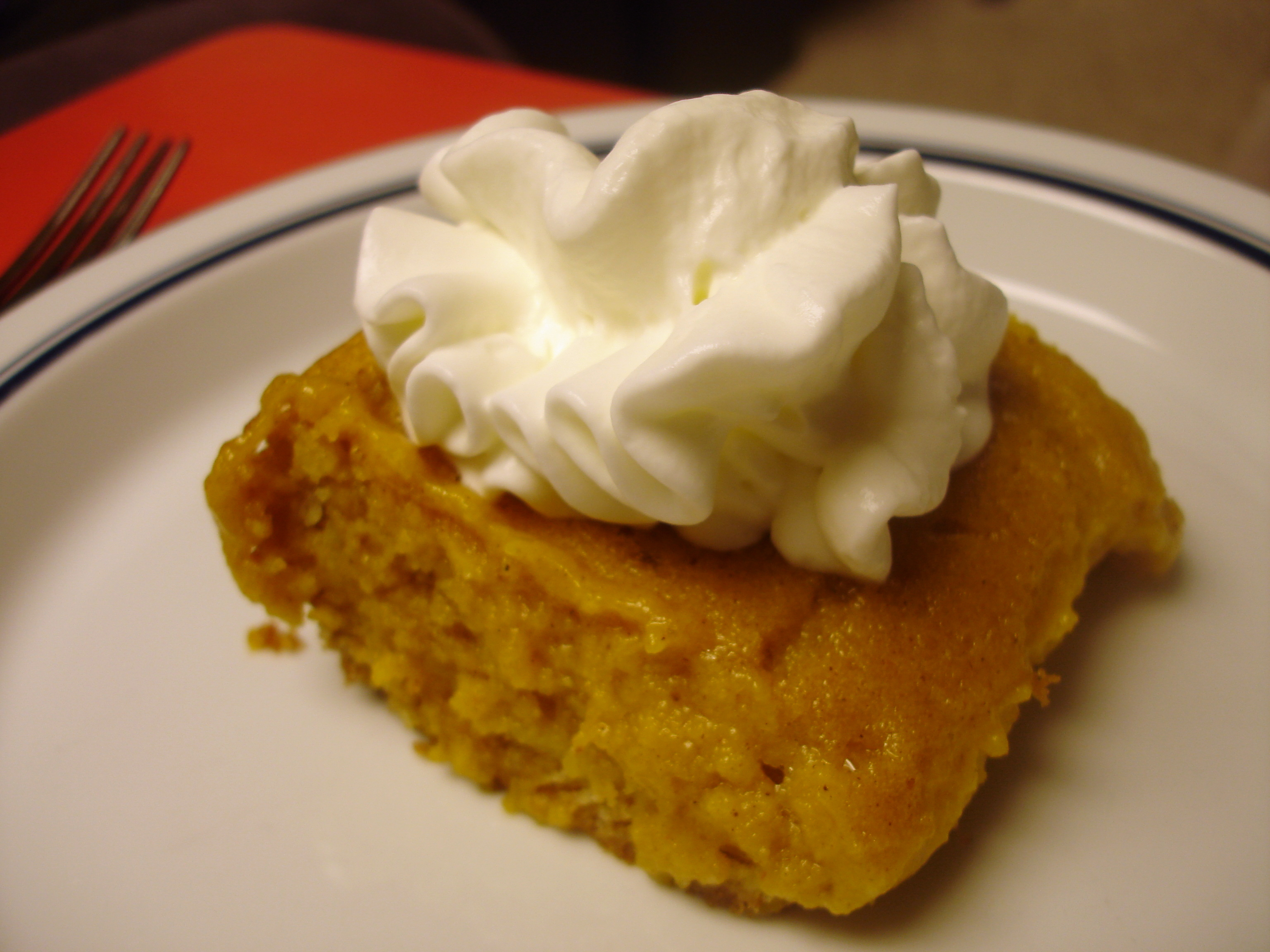
Gooey butter cake is a type of cake traditionally made in the American Midwest city of St. Louis.

- German chocolate cake
- Gingerbread
- Glorified rice
- Golden Opulence Sundae
- Gooey butter cake
- Grape pie
- Grasshopper pie

== H ==
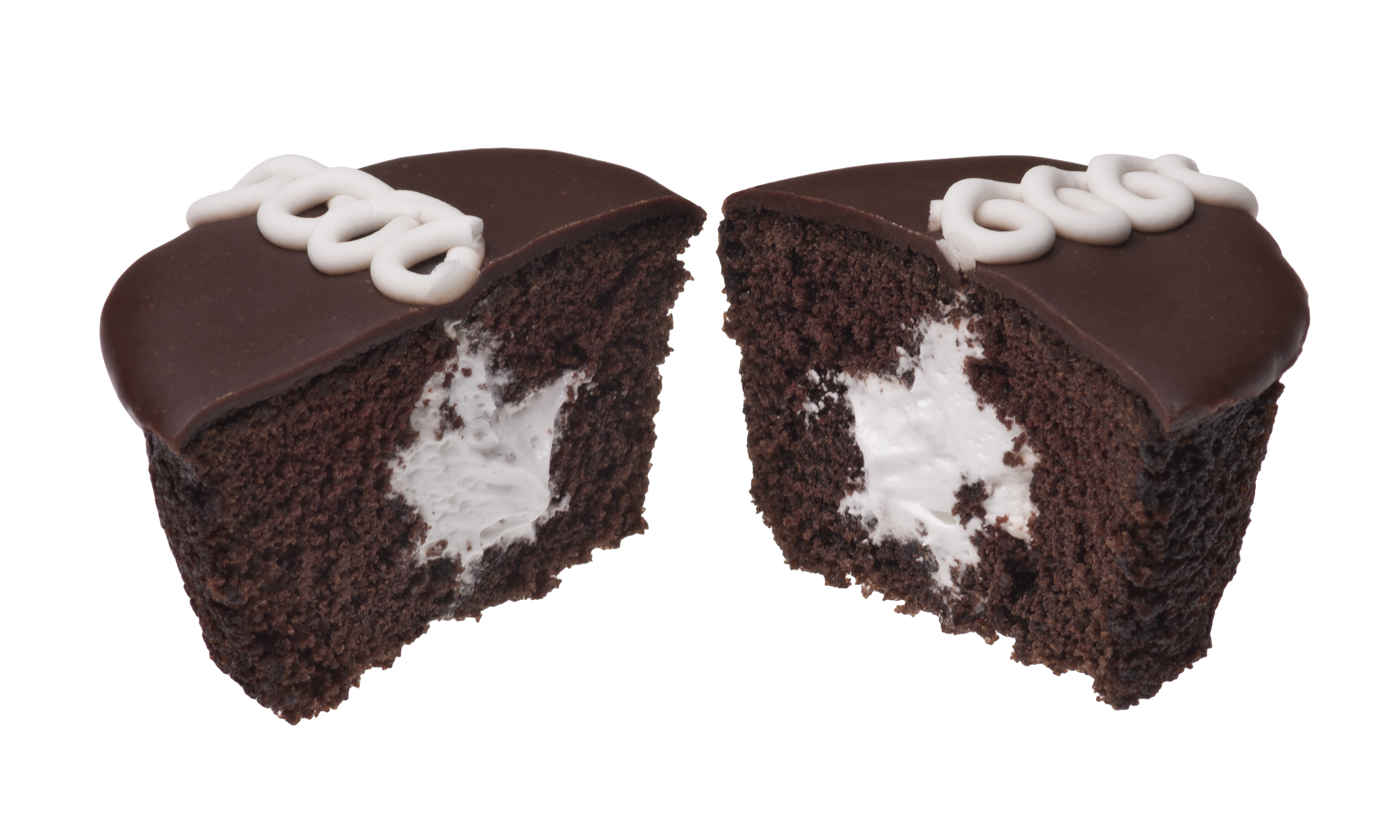
A halved Hostess CupCake

- Hasty pudding
- Haupia
- Ho Hos
- Hostess (snack cakes)
- Hostess CupCake
- Hot milk cake
- Huckleberry pie
- Hummingbird cake
- Hydrox

== I ==
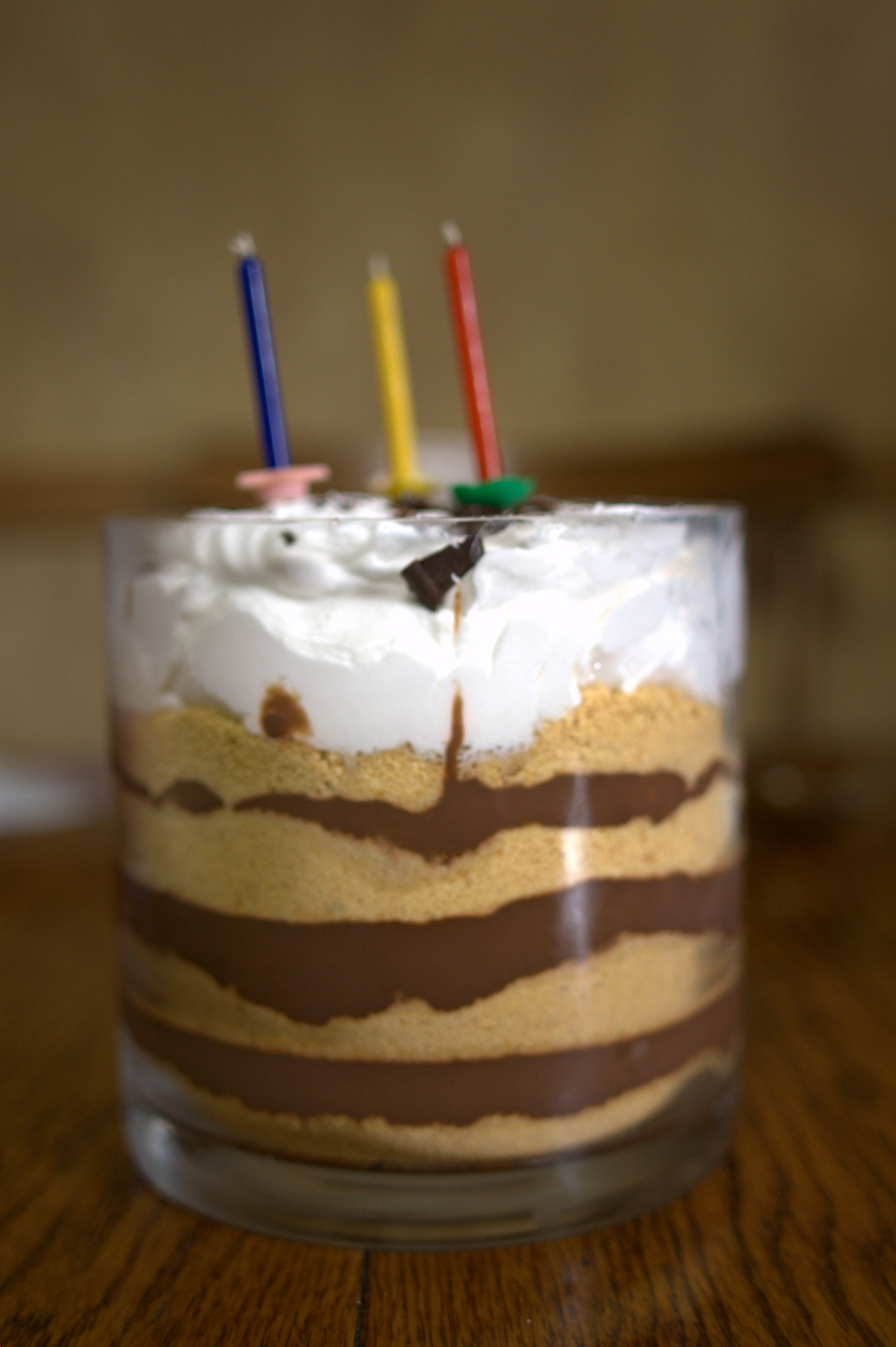
An icebox cake

- Ice cream cake
- Ice cream cone
- Icebox cake

== J ==
- Jefferson Davis pie
- Jell-O
- Jelly bean
- Jelly cream pie
- Joe Froggers

== K ==
- Key lime pie

== L ==
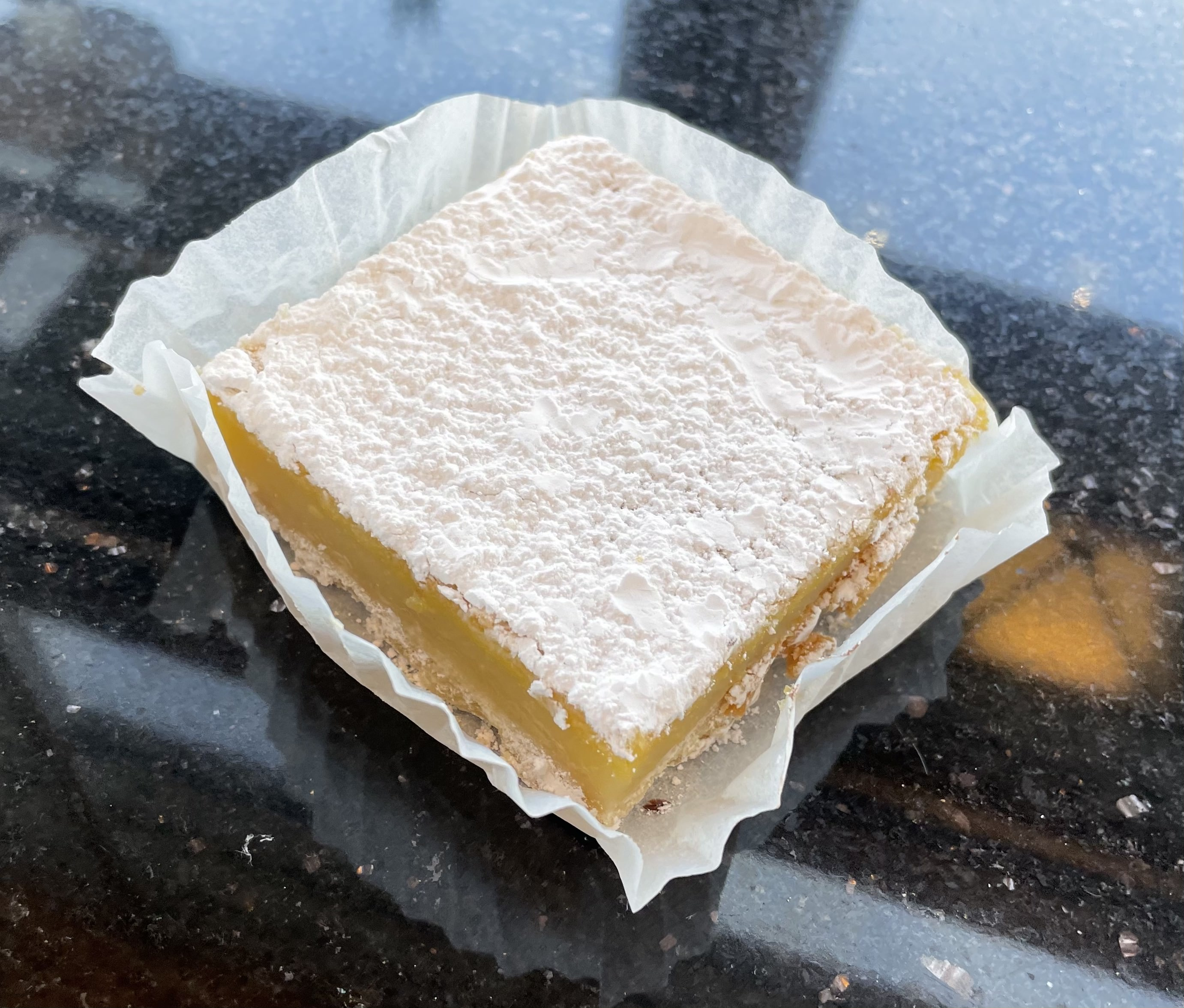
A lemon bar

- Lady Baltimore cake
- Lane cake
- Lava cake
- Lemon bar
- Lemon meringue pie

== M ==
- Maraca pie
- Marshmallow creme
- Mississippi mud pie
- Mochi donuts
- Molten chocolate cake
- Moon Pie
- Moravian spice cookies

== N ==
- Needham
- Newtons
- Nutter Butter

== O ==
- Oatmeal cookie
- Oatmeal Creme Pie
- Oreo

== P ==
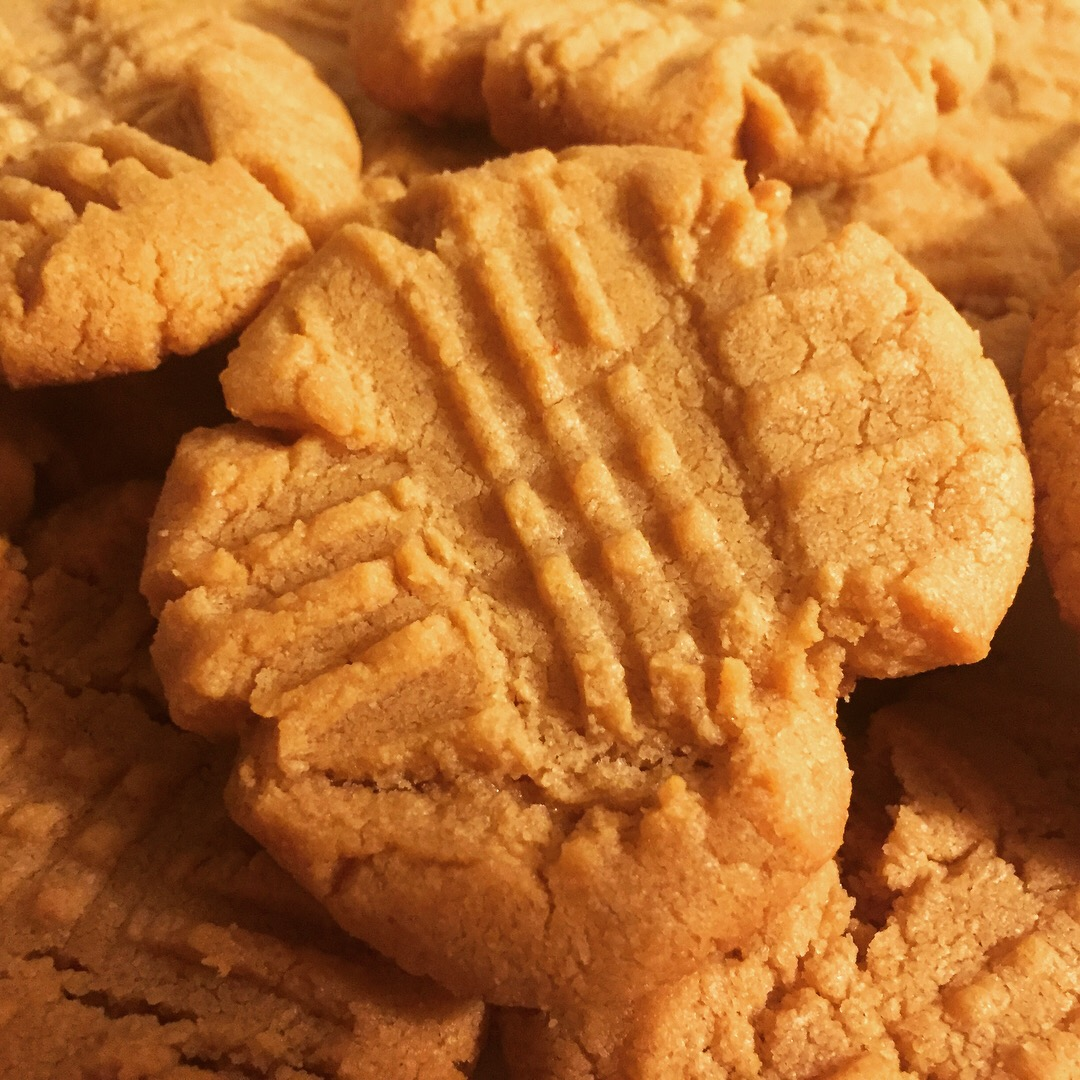
Fork-scored peanut butter cookies

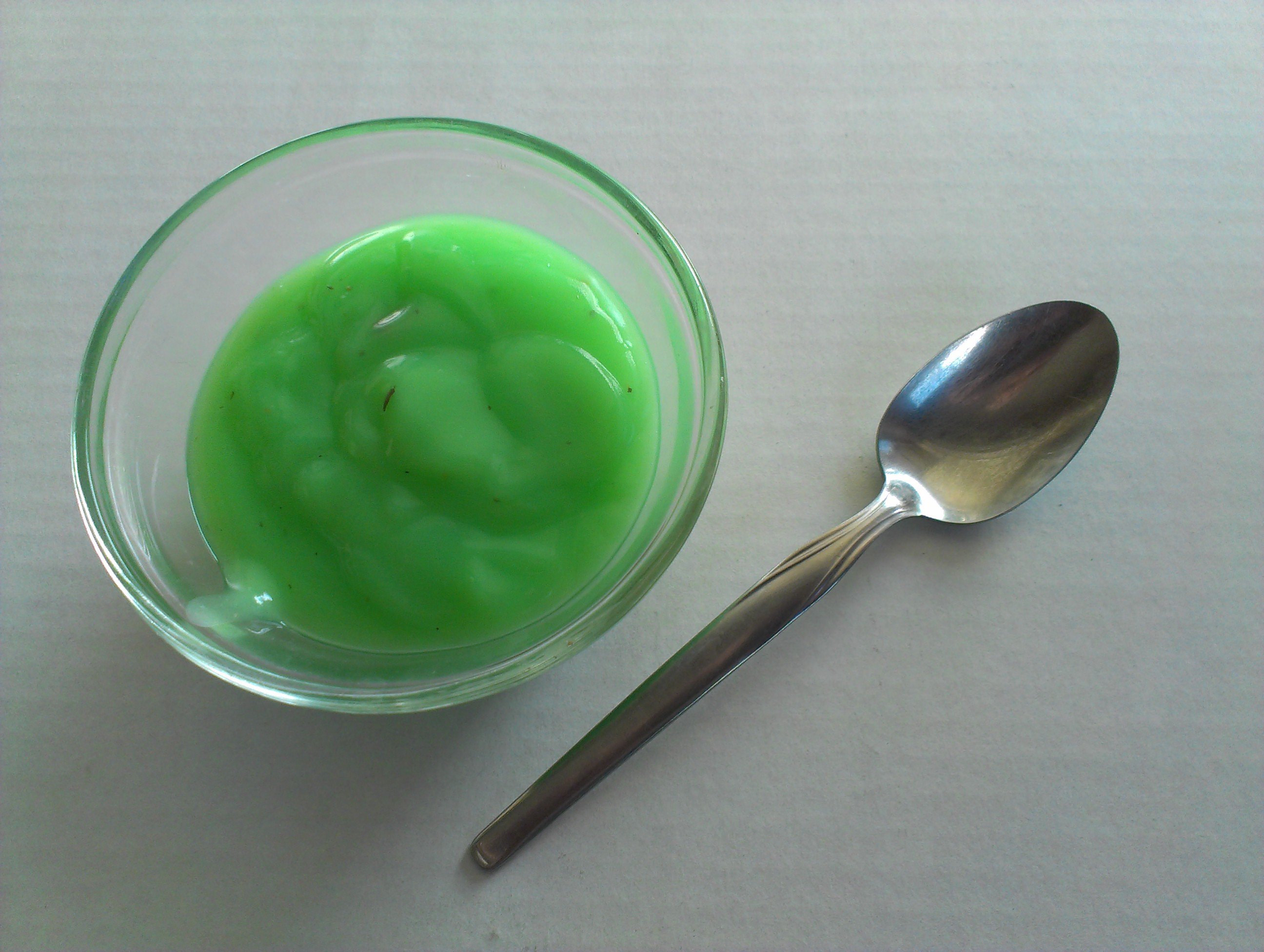
Pistachio pudding

- Pancake
- Panocha
- Parfait
- Pastry hearts
- Peanut butter cookies
- Pecan pie
- Pecan pralines
- Peppermint stick
- Persimmon pudding
- Pistachio pudding
- Poke cake
- Pop-Tarts
- Pound cake
- Pudding
- Pumpkin pie

== R ==
- Red velvet cake
- Rhubarb pie
- Rice Krispies Treats
- Rice pudding
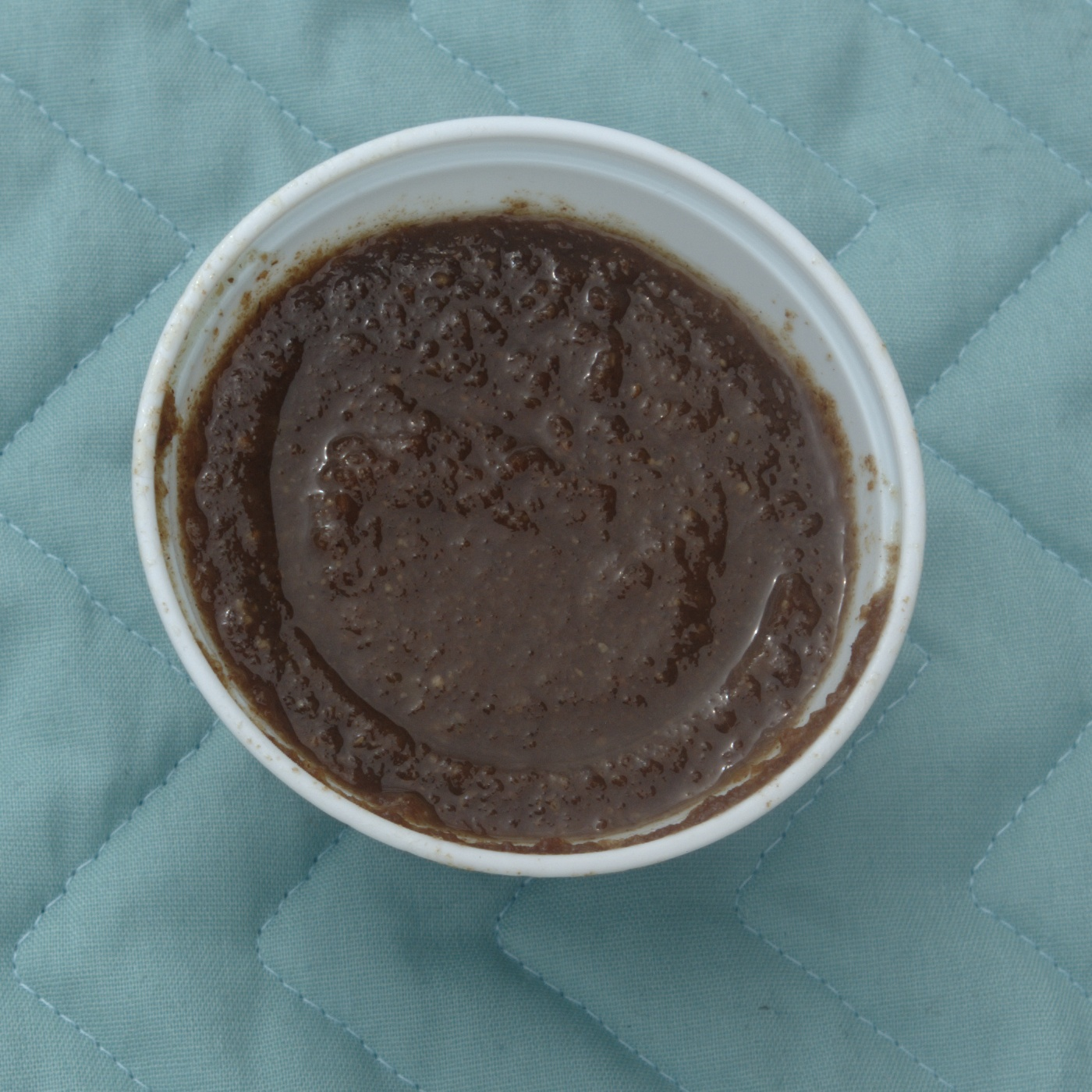
In New Mexico and southern Colorado, panocha is a pudding made from ground sprouted wheat and piloncillo.

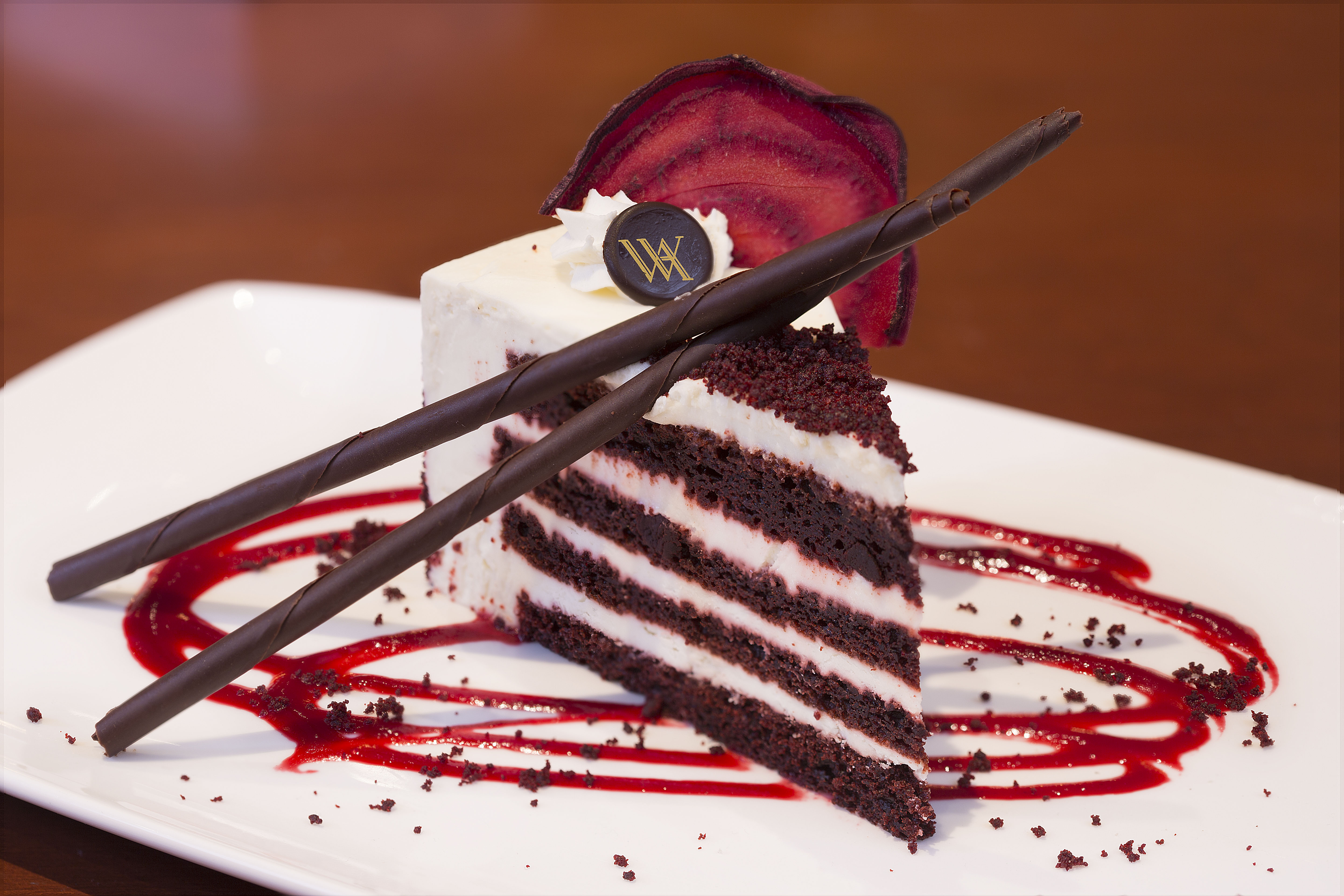
Red velvet cake is traditionally prepared as a layer cake topped with cream cheese or cooked ermine icing. The reddish color is achieved by adding beetroot or red food coloring.

== S ==
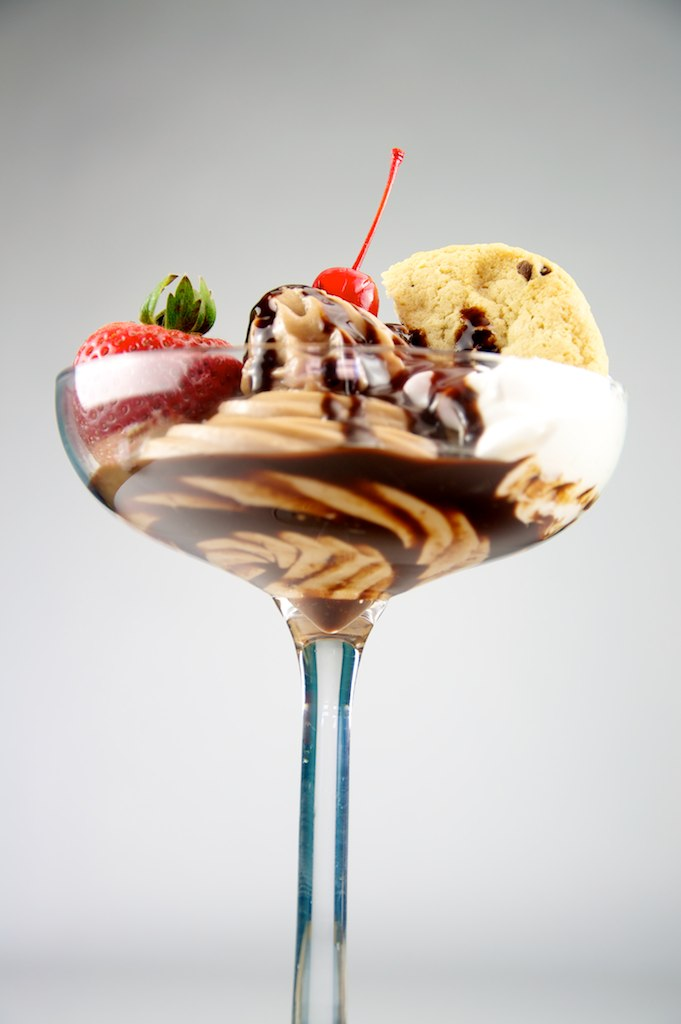
A sundae

- Salt water taffy
- Scone
- Scotcheroos
- Shaker lemon pie
- Shave ice
- Shaved ice
- Shoofly pie
- S'more
- Smith Island cake
- Snack cake
- Snickerdoodles
- Snickers salad
- Sno Balls
- Soft serve ice cream
- Sopaipilla
- Stack cake
- Strawberry delight
- Strawberry shortcake
- Strawberry rhubarb pie
- Sundae
- Sweet potato pie
- Swiss roll

== T ==
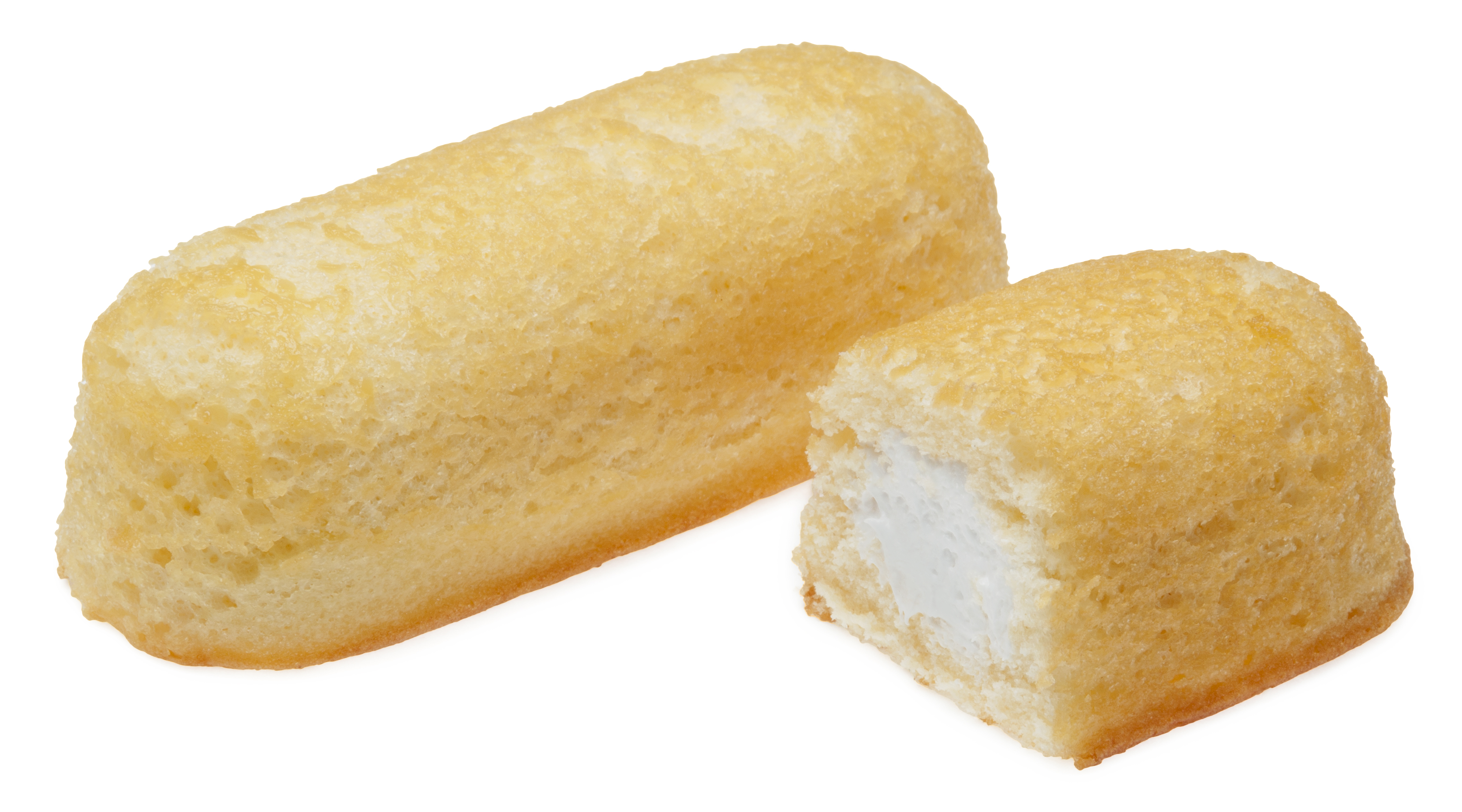
Whole and split Twinkie snack cakes

- Tapioca pudding
- Tipsy cake
- Twinkie

== W ==
- Waffle
- Waldorf pudding
- Watergate salad
- Whoopie pie

== Y ==
- Yodels

== Z ==
- Zingers

== See also ==
- Cuisine
- List of American foods
- List of American regional and fusion cuisines
- List of desserts
