= Flaum =

Flaum is a surname. Notable people with the surname include:

- Joel Flaum (1936–2024), American judge
- Marshall Flaum (1925–2010), American television director, producer, and screenwriter
- Thea Flaum (born 1938), American television producer

== See also ==
- Flam (surname)
