= Flam (surname) =

Flam is a surname. Notable people with the surname (or its variant Flahm) include:

- Abraham Bär Flahm, 19th-century Jewish editor and publisher
- Aron Flam (born 1978), Swedish comedian, podcaster, and writer, and actor
- Faye Flam (born c. 1964), American science writer
- Gila Flam (born 1956), Israeli musicologist, ethnomusicologist, and a librarian, a researcher of Jewish music
- Harry Flam (born 1948), Swedish economics professor at Stockholm University
- Helena Flam (born 1951), Polish-born sociology professor at the University of Leipzig
- Herbert Flam (1928–1980), Jewish-American tennis player
- Leopold Flam (1912–1995), Belgian philosopher
- Shlomo Flam (died 1813), Volhynian rabbi

== See also ==
- Flam (disambiguation)
- Flaim (surname)
- Flom (surname)
