= Gay Parent =

American LGBT parenting magazine

Gay Parent is a North American bi-monthly lifestyle and news publication which targets the gay and lesbian parenting community. The magazine publishes articles on international and domestic adoption, foster care, donor insemination and surrogacy.

== History and profile ==
The first issue was published in November 1998. That same year in September the magazine launched a website. The magazine has featured State Senator Jarrett Barrios, writer and performer Susie Bright, and sex advice columnist and author Dan Savage.

The headquarters of Gay Parent is in Forest Hills, New York.
