= Results for Development =

Non profit organisation

- Abbreviation: R4D
- Type: Nonprofit organization
- Headquarters: 1111 19th Street NW, Suite 700
- Location: Washington, D.C.
- President: Gina Lagomarsino
- Website: http://www.r4d.org

Results for Development (R4D) is a global nonprofit strategy consulting organization.

== Regions and countries ==
Results for Development is active in more than 55 countries.

== History ==
Founded in 2008 by David de Ferranti, who served with the World Bank and various international foundations, including the Rockefeller Foundation. De Ferranti worked at RAND Corporation and was a senior fellow at the Brookings Institution. He holds a doctorate in economics from Princeton University and a bachelor of arts from Yale College.

== Board of directors ==
Current members of the board include Ngozi Okonjo-Iweala (Former Minister of Finance and Economy of Nigeria), Jorge Quiroga, (Former President of Bolivia), Julio Frenk (President of the University of Miami), Roberto Danino (Former Prime Minister of Peru), Doug Hattaway (President/CEO of Hattaway Communications), Ozgur Karaosmanoglu (SVP of Raymond James & Associates), Dzingai Mutumbuka (Chair of the Association for the Development of Education in Africa), Mark W. Hinkley (Former Executive Vice President of OdysseyRe), and former R4D President David de Ferranti, who chairs the board.
