= Flim =

Flim or FLIM may refer to:

- Fermanagh Light Infantry Militia
- Fluorescence-lifetime imaging microscopy
- Jimmy Johnson (bassist) (born 1956), American bass guitarist
- "Flim", a song by Aphex Twin from Come to Daddy, 1997
- "Flim", a song by Mouse on Mars from Glam, 1998
- Flim (Star Wars), a character in the Star Wars franchise
- A misspelling of film

== See also ==
- Flims, a municipality in Switzerland
- Flim-flam (disambiguation)
- Film (disambiguation)
