= Maraca (disambiguation) =

Maraca is a musical instrument.

Maraca may also refer to:

== Places ==
- Maracas Valley in Trinidad and Tobago
  - Maracas Beach
  - Maracas–Saint Joseph
- Maracá Ecological Station in Brazil
- Maracá-Jipioca Ecological Station in Brazil
- Maracá River, a river in Amapá, Brazil

== Other ==
- Maraca, an obsolete name for Bumba, a genus of tarantulas
- Maraca (cockroach), Neotropical cockroach in the family Anaplectidae
- Maricón, a gay man or in Spanish profanity
- "Maraca" (song), a 2011 song by Swedish artist Mohombi
- Maraca pie
