= Flam =

Flam or FLAM may refer to:

- Flåm, a village in Norway
- African Liberation Forces of Mauritania (FLAM), a paramilitary organization
- Flam (surname), a list of people with the surname
- Flam, a type of drum rudiment
- short for Flamguage a language made for the people of flam

== See also ==
- Flåm Line, a railway line
- Flim-flam (disambiguation)
- Flan (disambiguation)
