= Fruit pizza =

Round pastry featuring multiple fruit garnishes

Fruit Pizza
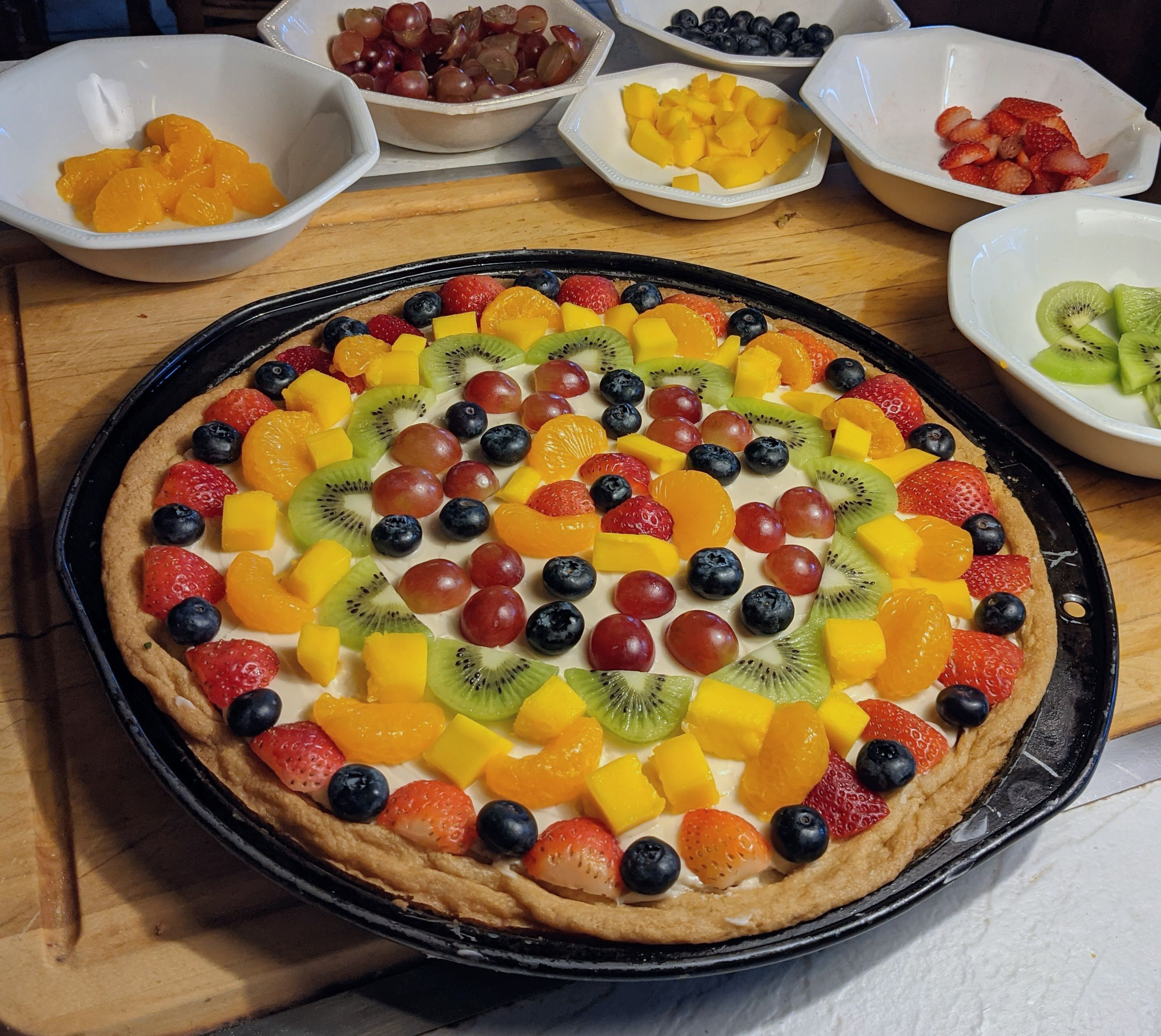
- An example of fruit pizza
- Type: Tart
- Course: Dessert
- Place of origin: United States
- Main ingredients: Pizza-shaped cookie crust, frosting, fruit

A fruit pizza is a type of pastry that is distinguished by its pizza-shaped cookie crust, frosting, and fruit toppings. Fruit pizza is well known for the colorful designs and patterns made by the intricate arrangement of the many different fruits topping the dessert. Fruit pizza is often seen as a healthier dessert option due to the prominence of fresh fruit.

== History ==
Dishes similar to fruit pizza have been made since at least the 6th century BC when Persian soldiers baked flatbreads with cheese and dates on top of their battle shields. The modern pizza is attributed to Naples, Italy in the 18th century, yet it wasn't until sometime between the end of World War II and the 1980s until there is record of modern dessert pizzas such as fruit pizza.

== Common attributes and variations ==
The fruit pizza includes a thin crust that is typically a sugar cookie flavor, but can also be chocolate chip, snickerdoodle, or other sweet cookie or dough flavors. The crust is typically shaped in a circular pizza pan, but can also be shaped in a rectangular pan. The crust of the fruit pizza is baked, allowed to cool, and then covered on top by a layer of frosting. Typically, the frosting is cream cheese-style frosting, but in variations can include or be replaced or combined with strawberry glaze or a chocolate spread. The fruit topping typically includes at least three different varieties of fruit with larger fruits being sliced into bite-sized portions. The fruit toppings often include berries and tropical fruit, although the choice of fruit can be widely modified and also commonly includes apples, pears, mandarins, nectarines, apricots, peaches, bananas, mangoes, strawberries, raspberries, blueberries, kiwifruit, passionfruit and melons.

A striking feature of the fruit pizza is the intricate arrangement of the brightly colored fruit that tops the dessert. The ability to customize the design of the fruit pizza, has made it a common dessert for holidays with bright colors such as Easter, occasions with strong design themes such as heart-shaped desserts for Valentine's Day, or days of national significance such as Independence Day especially as the design of the flag of the United States which can be made with a combination of blueberry, banana, and strawberry fruit toppings. Other examples of fruit pizzas being used for occasions of national significance include "royal wedding viewing parties" in the United Kingdom with the design of the fruit pizza being that of the Union Flag.

== Controversy ==
Some commentators have argued that dessert pizzas, such as fruit pizza, should not use the name pizza. A clear dichotomy is further complicated by the fact that tomatoes are fruit.

The fruit pizza is a tart with pizza-like characteristics. The distinguishing feature of fruit pizza is not only the pizza-like configuration (bready-base in large circle or rectangle, sauce-like binding layer and zone to hold toppings), but also the wide variety of fruits included as toppings compared to typical tarts which tend to include only one or two fruits as topping. Further, while fruit pizza also commonly has a cream cheese frosting layer similar to cheesecake, the cream cheese layer of a cheesecake is notably the thickest in a stark contrast with the thinner layer of cream cheese frosting commonly used in fruit pizza.

== See also ==
Media related to Fruit pizzas at Wikimedia Commons

- List of American desserts
