= Archibald Query =

American inventor

- Born: Joseph Archibald Query; December 16, 1873; Montreal, Quebec, Canada
- Died: March 1964 (aged 90); Boston, Massachusetts, United States
- Occupation: Confectioner
- Known for: invented Marshmallow Fluff
- Spouse: Elizabeth M.

Archibald Query (December 16, 1873 – March 1964) was a Canadian-born American confectioner, who invented Marshmallow Fluff, a special formula of marshmallow cream, in 1917.

== Biography ==
Query developed the recipe in his kitchen, initially selling his marshmallow fluff door-to-door. With the advent of World War I there were serious shortages of sugar, one of the basic ingredients in his recipe. With his business faltering, Query sold his formula to two partner candymakers H. Allen Durkee and Fred Mower. When mixed with peanut butter, it is the primary ingredient in a sandwich known as a Fluffernutter.

He was a resident of Somerville, Massachusetts, where he lived at 106 Bromfield Road.

Joseph Archibald Query died in Boston in 1964, at the age of 90.

== See also ==
- Marshmallow Fluff
