= Solo Foods =

American food manufacturing company

Solo Foods, LLC
- Founded: 1925; 101 years ago
- Founder: John A. Sokol
- Headquarters: United States
- Owner: Sokol & Company (1925–2024); Saco Foods (2024–present)
- Website: www.solofoods.com

Solo Foods, LLC is a manufacturer of food ingredients, makers of Solo and Baker dessert fruit and nut fillings, marshmallow creme and toasted marshmallow creme, Simon Fischer fruit butters, marzipan, almond paste and Chun’s Asian cooking sauces.

After controlling it since its founding in 1925, Sokol and Company, Inc. sold the brand in January 2024 to Saco Foods.

== Products ==
Today the Solo line includes 13 varieties of ready-to-use cake, pastry and dessert toppings and fillings: almond, apple, apricot, blueberry, cherry, date, nut, pecan, pineapple, poppy, prune, raspberry and strawberry; almond paste and marzipan; Baker brand flavors (almond, apple, apricot, blueberry, cherry, date, nut, peach, pineapple, poppy, prune, raspberry and strawberry); Baker pie fillings (apple, cherry, blueberry, peach, mixed berry) Solo marshmallow creme and toasted marshmallow creme; and Chun’s brand sweet and sour, fish sauce, sesame garlic, cilantro teriyaki, chili vinegar, chili lemongrass and thai peanut marinades and dipping sauces.

In 2010, Solo introduced "Whoopie Do!" a whoopie pie mix available in both classic and s'mores and "Let's Wing It!" a line of chicken wing coating mixes under the Tasty Delite brand. Also in 2010, Solo acquired Borden's EggNog business from the J. M. Smucker Company.

== History ==
John Sokol in front of his grocery store with family and employees.

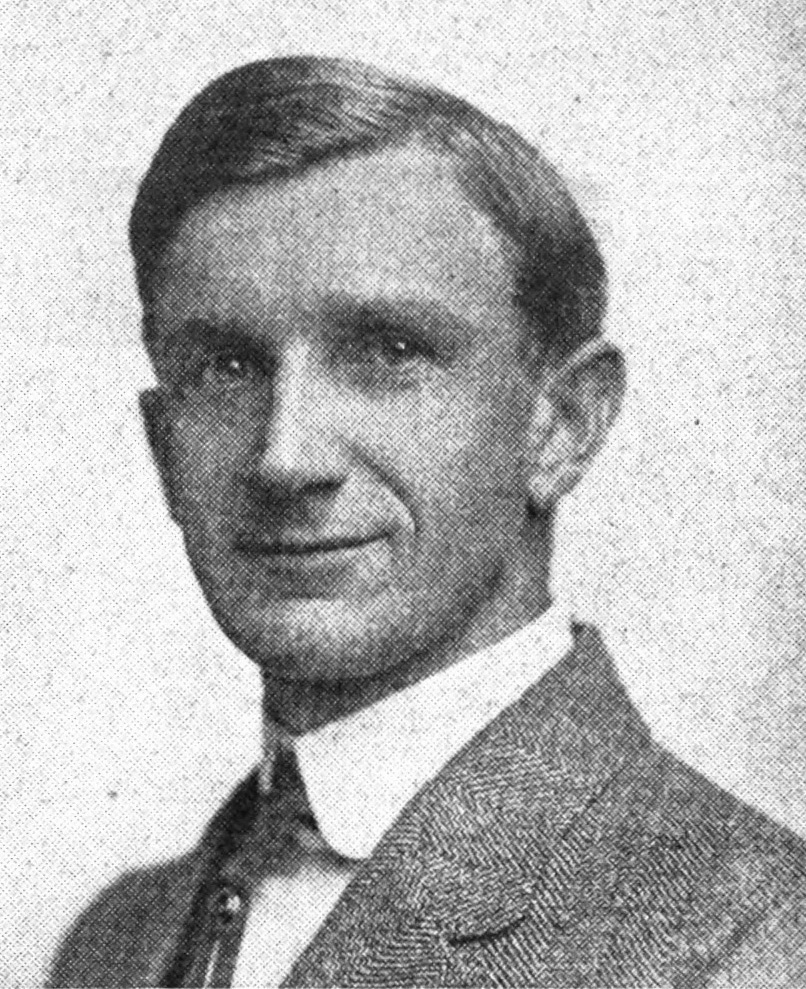
John A. Sokol, founder of the company

Solo Foods was founded by John A. Sokol, a Czechoslovak immigrant who arrived in Chicago in 1889, entered the food business and by 1902, owned four grocery stores. In 1905, Sokol launched a wholesale coffee, tea and spice business and incorporated the name Sokol & Company in 1907.

After World War I, Sokol helped found the Czechoslovak-American Chamber of Commerce and also established European importing contacts to enable his Chicago-based company to purchase herbs and spices. This move helped create the Solo line of food products which was introduced in the 1920s.

Canned cake and pastry fillings made from prunes and European-imported poppy seeds became a success. Later the company expanded into dehydrated foods, imported spices and other fruit-based Solo dessert fillings.

Based in Countryside, Illinois, Sokol & Company provides food manufacturing, packaging and processing to retail and industrial markets as well as anchovy products packaged under the Certified Savory brand.

The current president of Sokol & Company is the founder’s great grandson, John Sokol Novak, Jr., the current COO is Ralph Pirritano.

== Sokol Custom Food Ingredients ==
Sokol produces a wide range of ingredient products for the food industry including fruit and nut fillings, icings, caramels, chocolates, fruit glazes, sauces, and frozen dessert bases and variegates.

Industrial Capabilities:

- Manufacturer of sweet and savory sauces and wet specialty products.
- Products used as ingredients, components or co-packed as finished products.
- Industrial Drums and Pails for hot fill, shelf stable or refrigerated products.
- Retail packaging: glass, plastic and cans.
- Pouching from 2 ounces to 8 pounds.
- R&D services.

Solo's Certified Savory brand is the largest manufacturer of anchovy paste and anchovy powder in the U.S.

== Retail Products ==
Solo Foods' core businesses is sweet and savory food ingredients

- Solo Cake, Pastry and Dessert Fillings
- Almond Paste
- Solo Marzipan
- Solo Marshmallow Creme
- Solo Toasted Marshmallow Creme
- Solo Whoopie Do! whoopie pie mix
- Baker Cake, Pastry and Dessert Fillings
- Baker Pie Fillings
- Baker Natural Pie Fillings
- Chun's Asian Dipping Sauces and Marinades
- Simon Fischer Fruit Butters
- Tasty Delite "Let's Wing It!" chicken coating mix and sauce
- Borden EggNog
