= Flim-flam =

Flim-flam may refer to:

- Confidence trick, a type of fraud
- Flim-Flam (album), a 1991 album by Steve Lacy and Steve Potts
- Flim-Flam!, a 1982 book by James Randi
- Flim Flam, a character in the Scooby-Doo franchise
- Flim Flam (horse), a Hanoverian dressage horse

== See also ==
- "Film Flam", an episode of the television series The Powerpuff Girls
- Flim and Flam, a pair of antagonists in the television series My Little Pony: Friendship Is Magic
- The Flim-Flam Man, a 1967 American film
- Flam (disambiguation)
- Flim (disambiguation)
