= Whoopie pie =

American pastry

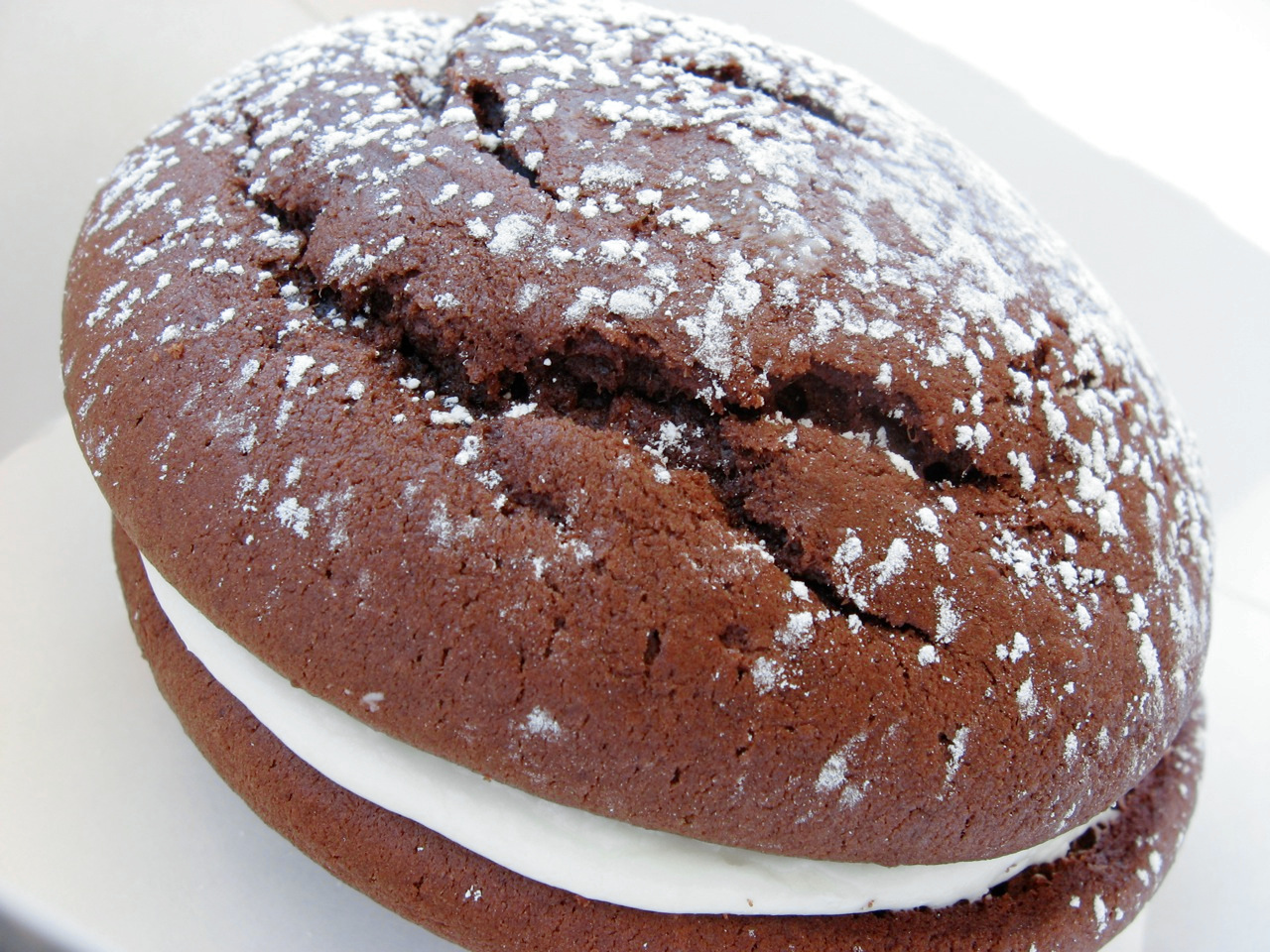
- Alternative names: Black moon, gob, black-and-white men, bob
- Type: Cookie, pie, sandwich, or cake
- Place of origin: United States
- Region or state: Northeastern United States
- Main ingredients: Cake (usually chocolate); icing or Marshmallow creme

The whoopie pie, alternatively called a black moon, gob (Pittsburgh area), black-and-white, or bob, is an American baked confection that is considered as either a cookie, pie, or cake. A Whoopie Pie is composed of two round, mound-shaped pieces of cake (traditionally chocolate cake, although sometimes available with pumpkin, gingerbread, or other flavored cake), sandwiching a sweet, fluffy and creamy filling (somewhat like a marshmallow creme-based buttercream).

== History ==
While people consider the whoopie pie a New England classic and a Pennsylvania Amish tradition, vendors sell whoopie pies throughout the United States.

In the Pittsburgh, Pennsylvania, region, people refer to the dessert as "Gob." The Dutch Maid Bakery in Johnstown, Pennsylvania, trademarked the term in 1980 when Tim Yost purchased the rights to the name and process.

Maine officially recognized the whoopie pie as its state treat in 2011 (not to be confused with the official state dessert, which is blueberry pie). On March 26, 2011, creators in South Portland, Maine, made the world's largest whoopie pie, which weighed in at 1,062 lb (481.7 kg). The event sold pieces of the giant whoopie pie and used the proceeds to send Maine-made whoopie pies to soldiers serving overseas. The previous record holder, from Pennsylvania, weighed 200 lb (90.7 kg). The town of Dover-Foxcroft, Maine, has hosted the Maine Whoopie Pie Festival since 2009. In 2014, more than 7,500 people attended the festival. The 2013 festival had eight different whoopie pie vendors in attendance. Bakers from across Maine compete for the top whoopie pie in several categories.

== Origin controversy ==
Maine, Massachusetts, New Hampshire, Pennsylvania, and Virginia all claim to be the birthplace of the whoopie pie. The Pennsylvania Dutch Convention & Visitors Bureau notes that their whoopie pie recipe comes from the area's Amish and Pennsylvania German culture and has been handed down through generations. Additionally, the community is very insular and tends not to adopt external ideas. They therefore argue the whoopie pie is possibly an internal invention of the Amish community.

However, the earliest written records of whoopie pies from Pennsylvania date from the 1960s, while Labadie's Bakery in Lewiston, Maine, has records of making the confection dating to 1925. The now-defunct Berwick Cake Company of Roxbury, Massachusetts, was selling "Whoopee Pies" as early as the 1920s, but officially branded the Whoopee Pie in 1928 to great success. Various claims suggest that the whoopie pie originated in Massachusetts and spread both north and south, or that German immigrants in Pennsylvania brought the predecessor of the whoopie pie to communities throughout the northeast. A clue into how the possibly Amish dessert got to be so popular in New England can be found in a 1930s cookbook called Yummy Book by the Durkee Mower Company, the manufacturer of Marshmallow Fluff. In this New England cookbook, a recipe for "Amish Whoopie Pie" was featured using Marshmallow Fluff in the filling.

In 2011, the Maine State Legislature considered naming the whoopie pie the official state pie. The proposal received bipartisan support. L.D. 71, officially known as "An Act to Designate the Whoopie Pie as the State Dessert", read "The whoopie pie, a baked good made of two chocolate cakes with a creamy frosting between them, is the official state dessert". The Maine Legislature eventually decided to declare the whoopie pie the official state treat, and chose blueberry pie (made with wild Maine blueberries) as the official state dessert.

== See also ==
- Dorayaki
- Macaron
- Monaka
- Moon pie
- Sandwich cookie
