= Boston cream pie =

Custard-filled sandwich cake

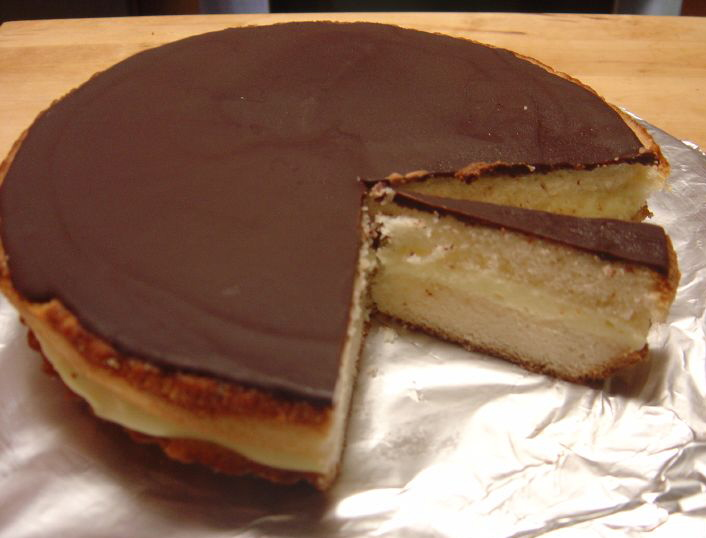
- A Boston cream pie
- Course: Dessert
- Place of origin: Boston, Massachusetts
- Region or state: New England
- Serving temperature: Room temperature or chilled
- Main ingredients: Sponge cake, custard, chocolate glaze

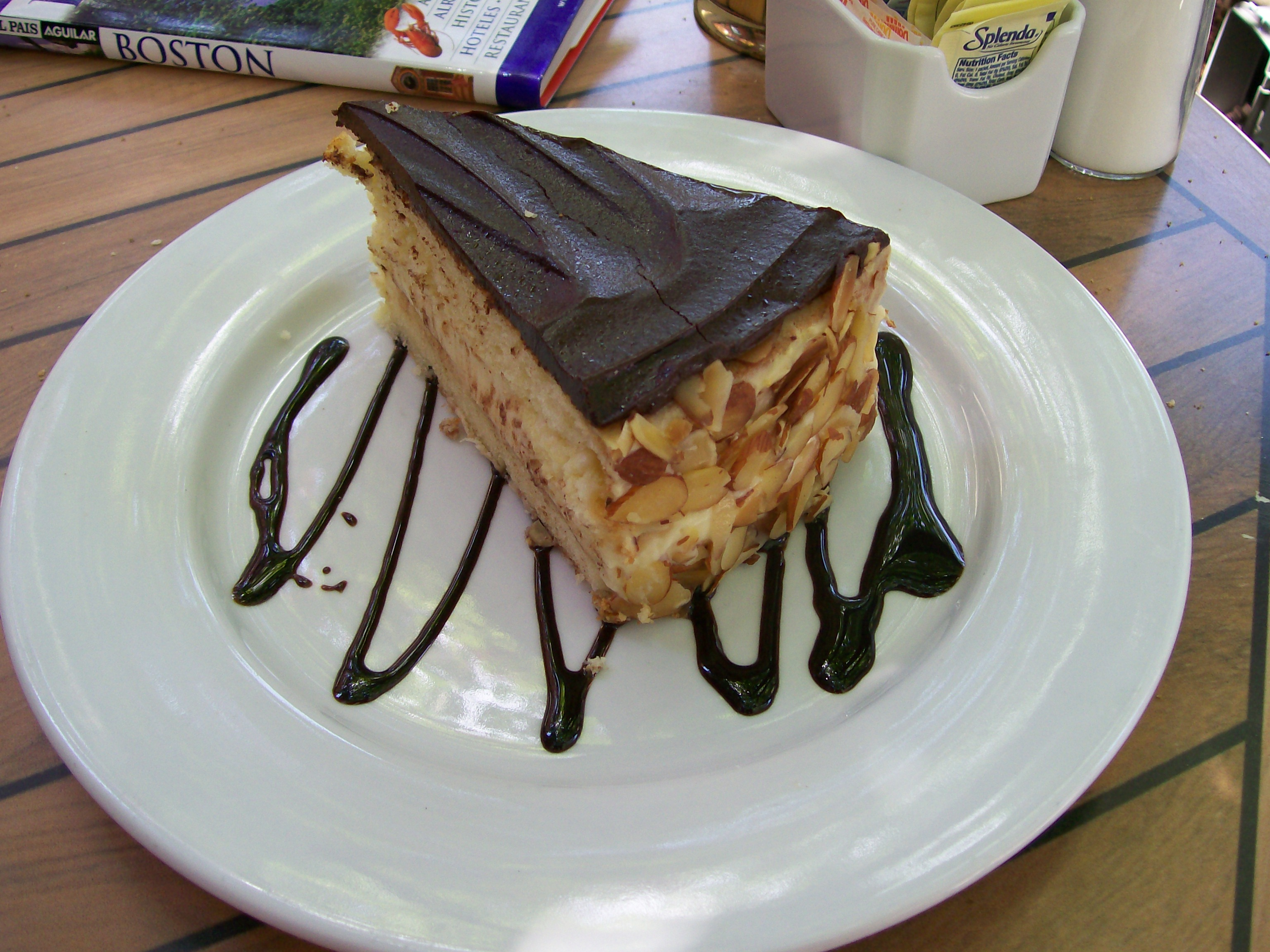
Boston cream pie with chocolate drizzle

A Boston cream pie is a cake with a custard filling. The dessert acquired its name when cakes and pies were baked in the same pans, and the words were used interchangeably. In the late 19th century, this type of cake was variously called a "cream pie", a "chocolate cream pie", or a "custard cake". The cake has been popular in Massachusetts since its creation.

== History ==
The dessert is estimated to have been created between 1834 and 1856. The invention of the pie is most commonly credited to French chef Augustine François Anezin (also named as M. Sanizan or Sanzian) at the Parker House Hotel in Boston, who reportedly made the dessert for its opening in 1856. A direct descendant of earlier cakes known as American pudding-cake pie, Beecher's cream cake, and Washington pie, the dessert was referred to as chocolate cream pie, Parker House chocolate cream pie, and finally Boston cream pie on Parker House's menus. The cake consisted of two layers of French butter sponge cake filled with thick custard and brushed with a rum syrup; its side was coated with the same custard overlaid with toasted sliced almonds, and the top coated with chocolate fondant. While other custard cakes may have existed at that time, baking chocolate as a coating was a new process, making it unique and a popular choice on the menu.

The name "chocolate cream pie" first appeared in the 1872 Methodist Almanac. An early printed use of the term "Boston cream pie" occurred in the Granite Iron Ware Cook Book, printed in 1878. The earliest known recipe for the modern variant was printed in Miss Parloa's Kitchen Companion in 1887 as "chocolate cream pie".

Boston cream pie is the official dessert of Massachusetts, declared as such on December 12, 1996.

== Variations ==
=== Boston cream doughnut ===
Boston cream doughnut
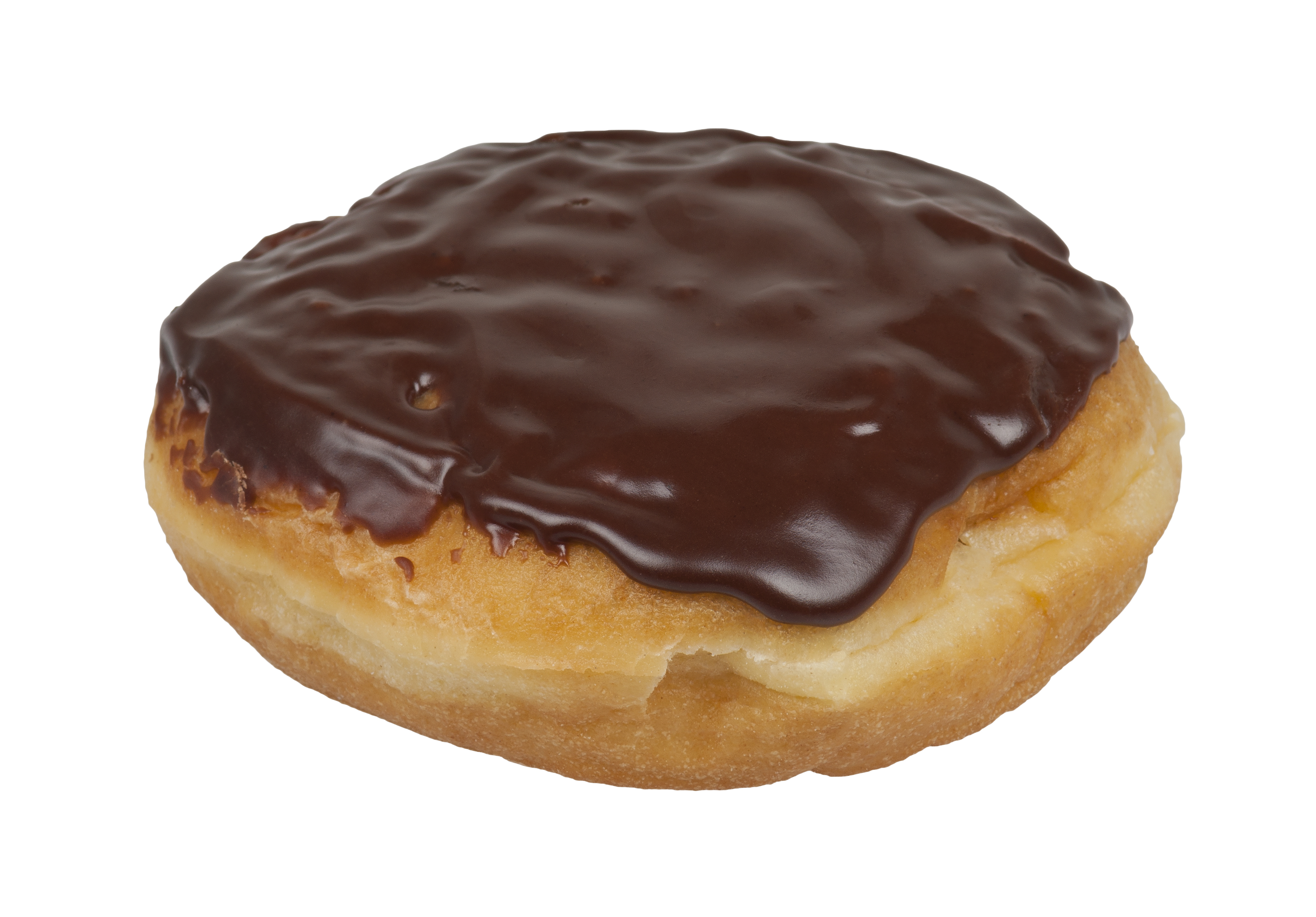
- Alternative names: Boston cream pie doughnut Boston cream pie donut
- Type: Doughnut
- Place of origin: United States
- Region or state: New England
- Main ingredients: Dough, chocolate icing, custard

A Boston cream doughnut (or Boston cream pie doughnut, also spelled donut, or simply Boston Cream) is a doughnut filled with vanilla custard or crème pâtissière and topped with icing made from chocolate. It is a round, solid, yeast-risen doughnut with chocolate frosting and a custard filling, resulting in a doughnut reminiscent of a miniature Boston cream pie, from which it was inspired.

The doughnut adaptation of the pie is popular not only in Massachusetts but throughout the United States and Canada. Also filled with the same cream, the Dunkin Donut's Bavarian cream doughnut differs from the Boston cream doughnut in that, instead of a chocolate glaze topping, the Bavarian cream doughnut is tossed in powdered sugar.

==== State doughnut of Massachusetts ====
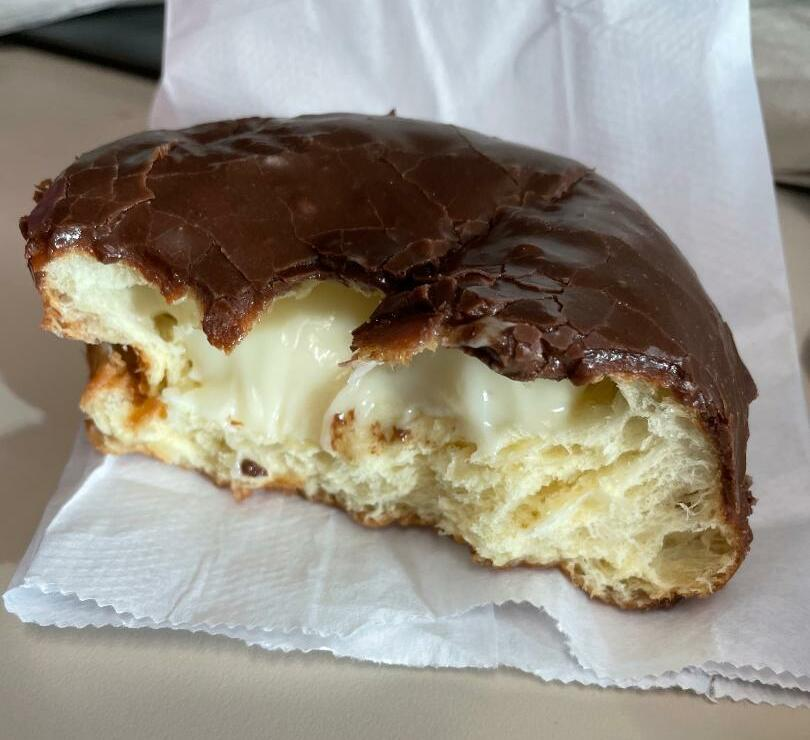
Interior view of a Boston cream doughnut

The Boston cream doughnut was designated the official doughnut of Massachusetts in 2003. Although the doughnut's popularity made it the natural choice for the state, it is one of only two official state donuts—the only other one being the beignet, the state doughnut of Louisiana.

== See also ==
- List of American desserts
- List of cakes
- List of regional dishes of the United States
- List of doughnut varieties
- List of breakfast foods
