= Fluffernutter =

Sandwich made with peanut butter and marshmallow creme

Fluffernutter sandwich
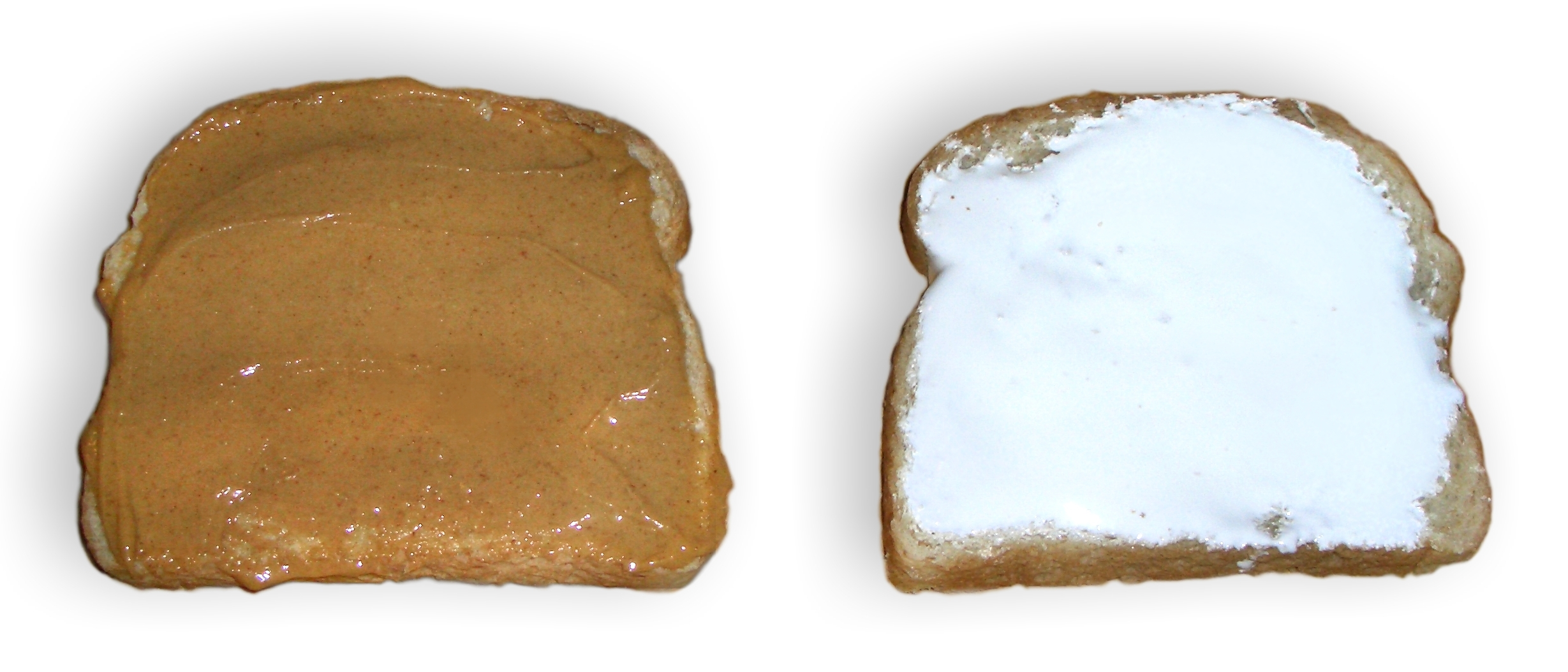
- Alternative names: Liberty Sandwich
- Place of origin: United States
- Region or state: New England; Massachusetts
- Created by: Emma Curtis
- Main ingredients: Peanut butter, marshmallow creme
- Food energy (per serving): 352 kcal (1,470 kJ)

A fluffernutter (also called a "peanut butter and marshmallow sandwich", "peanut butter and marshmallow fluff sandwich", or "peanut butter and marshmallow stuff sandwich") is a sandwich made with peanut butter and marshmallow creme usually served on white bread. Variations of the sandwich include the substitution of wheat bread and the addition of various sweet, salty, and savory ingredients. The term fluffernutter can also be used to describe other food items, primarily desserts, that incorporate peanut butter and marshmallow creme.

The sandwich was first created in the early 20th century after marshmallow creme, a sweet marshmallow-like spread, was invented in Massachusetts. During World War I, a recipe for a peanut butter and marshmallow creme sandwich, the earliest known example of the sandwich, was published. The term "fluffernutter" was created by an advertising agency in 1960 as a more effective way to market the sandwich.

The sandwich is particularly popular in New England and has been proposed as the official state sandwich of Massachusetts. The traditional Fluffernutter can be grilled for a popular variation.

== Recipe and variations ==
A fluffernutter is made by spreading peanut butter on a slice of bread, then spreading an equal amount of marshmallow creme on another slice and finally combining them to form a sandwich. Variations of the recipe include wheat bread instead of white, Nutella hazelnut spread instead of, or in addition to, peanut butter, and the addition of sweet ingredients like bananas or savory and salty ingredients like bacon. The Fluffernutter itself is often seen as a variation on the peanut butter and jelly sandwich. Though often seen as a food for children, the Fluffernutter recipe has been adapted to appeal to adult tastes. For example, a New York caterer serves a fluffernutter hors d'oeuvre in a toasted ice cream cone with a spoon of peanut butter and torched marshmallow creme on top.

The term fluffernutter has also been used to describe other foods that feature peanut butter and marshmallow creme, including fluffernutter cookies, bars, and cupcakes. Durkee-Mower, the company that produces Marshmallow Fluff, a brand of marshmallow creme, produces a cookbook that features recipes for fluffernutter bars, frosting, pie, and a shake. In 2006, Brigham's Ice Cream and Durkee-Mower introduced a fluffernutter flavor, which featured peanut butter and Marshmallow Fluff in vanilla ice cream. Fluffernutter was also the name of a candy briefly produced by the Boyer Brothers candy company beginning in 1969.

== History ==
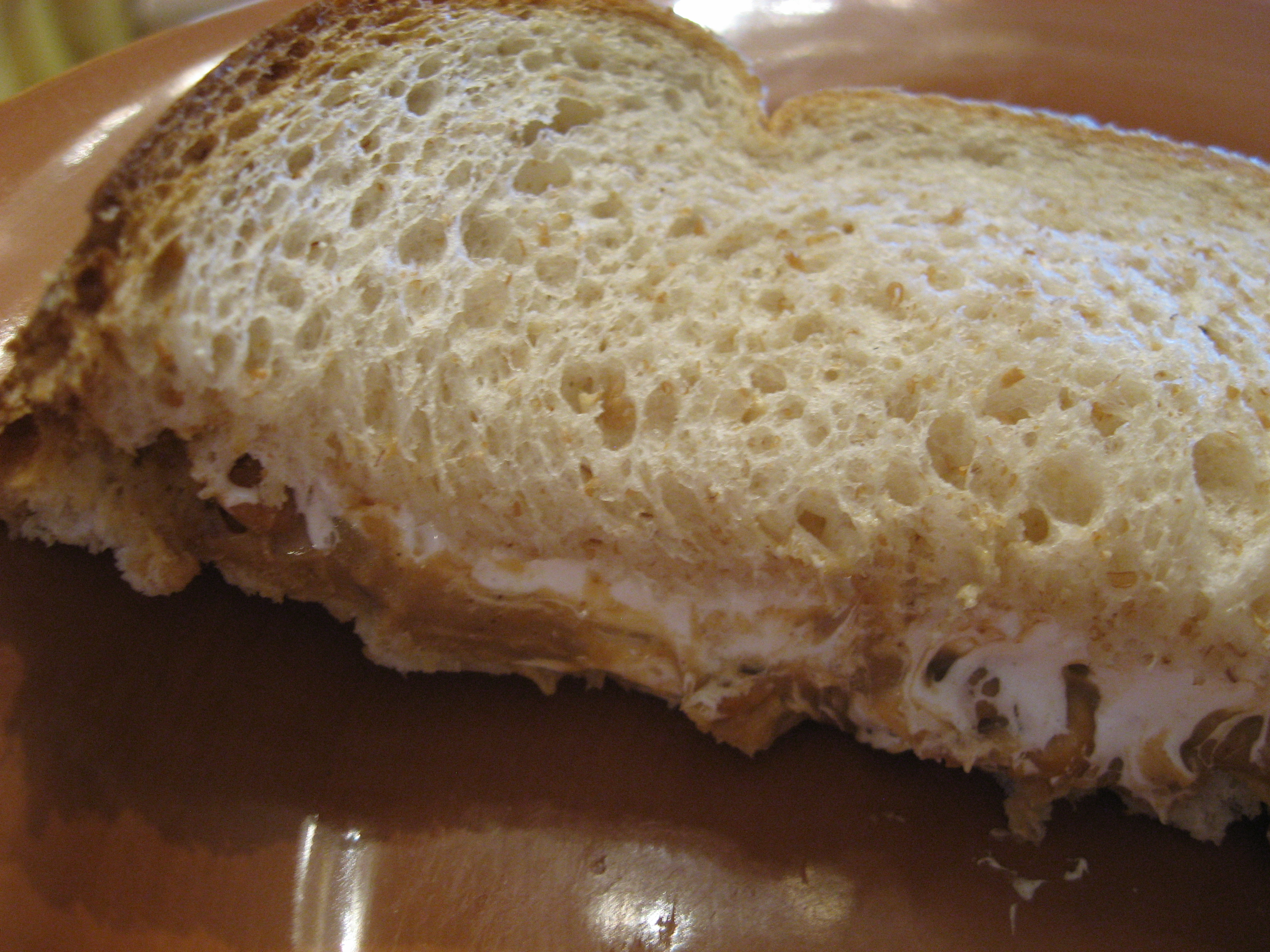
Half of a fluffernutter sandwich

Marshmallow creme was invented in the early 20th century. In 1917, Archibald Query invented what he called Marshmallow Creme in Somerville, Massachusetts. Amory and Emma Curtis of Melrose, Massachusetts, invented Snowflake Marshmallow Creme in 1913. During World War I, Emma Curtis published a recipe for the Liberty Sandwich, which consisted of peanut butter and Snowflake Marshmallow Creme on oat or barley bread. The recipe was published in a promotional booklet sent to Curtis' customers in 1918 and may be the origin of the fluffernutter sandwich. Earlier labels and booklets published by the Curtises suggested combining Snow Flake Marshmallow Creme with peanut butter or eating it on sandwiches with chopped nuts or olives.

Meanwhile, sugar shortages during World War I hurt sales of Archibald Query's Marshmallow Creme, so Query sold his recipe in 1920 to two men from Swampscott, Massachusetts, H. Allen Durkee and Fred L. Mower, who began distributing the product through their company, Durkee-Mower Inc. The pair renamed the product Toot Sweet Marshmallow Fluff, and Durkee-Mower continues to sell the product under the name Marshmallow Fluff. The sandwich made with peanut butter and marshmallow creme continued to be eaten, but was not called a fluffernutter until 1960, when an advertising firm Durkee-Mower hired created the term as a more effective way to market the sandwich. Fluffernutter is a registered trademark of Durkee-Mower, although the company's U.S. trademark registrations for the term cover only ice cream and printed recipes. In 2006, Durkee-Mower sued Williams-Sonoma, Inc. in the United States District Court for the District of Massachusetts, alleging that Williams-Sonoma, Inc. infringed on its trademark by selling a marshmallow and peanut butter chocolate-covered candy under the Fluffernutter name.

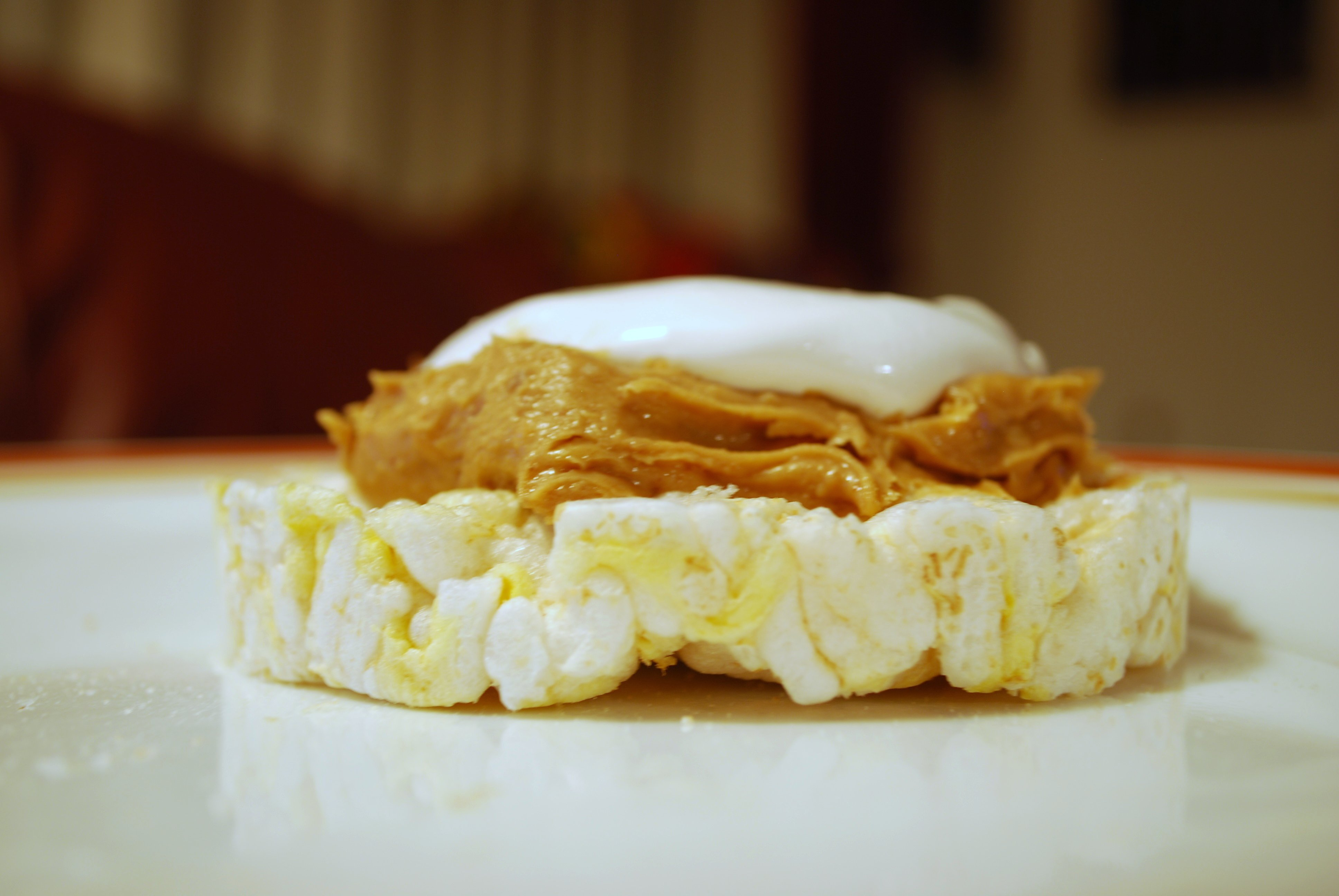
An open-faced variation of the fluffernutter sandwich using a rice cracker in place of sliced bread

In June 2006, Massachusetts State Senator Jarrett Barrios proposed legislation restricting the serving of fluffernutter sandwiches in public schools after learning that his son was served fluffernutters on a daily basis at his elementary school in Cambridge, Massachusetts. Barrios drafted an amendment to the junk food bill which would limit fluffernutters to once a week. The proposal was criticized as trivial and overly intrusive legislation, while Barrios' supporters pointed to concerns over childhood obesity. Among the people who defended the Fluffernutter at the time was Massachusetts State Representative Kathi-Anne Reinstein, whose district in Revere was close to Lynn, where Marshmallow Fluff is made. She claimed she would "fight to the death for Fluff" and supported legislation that would make the Fluffernutter the official state sandwich. The measure failed, and Reinstein tried again unsuccessfully in 2009. Supporters of the bill cited the sandwich's close association with childhood and Massachusetts.

In 2021, Merriam-Webster added the word fluffernutter to its dictionary.

== In popular culture ==
The term fluffernutter has sometimes been used disparagingly to describe something that lacks substance and has minimal to no cultural value. On the other hand, some writers look on fluffernutters and marshmallow creme as a source of childhood nostalgia and regional pride.

The sandwich has close ties to New England and Massachusetts, particularly to Somerville, where Archibald Query invented Marshmallow Fluff, and to Lynn, where Durkee-Mower has produced it for decades. Somerville holds an annual festival called What the Fluff? based around celebrating Marshmallow Fluff and Fluffernutter sandwiches. The festival incorporates music, visual art, games, and a cooking contest based around Fluff and Fluffernutters. In 2011, NASA astronaut Richard Michael Linnehan, who was born in Lowell and ate a fluffernutter while aboard the International Space Station, acted as one of the contest judges.

October 8 is National Fluffernutter Day.

== See also ==
- Comfort food
- Cuisine of New England
- List of regional dishes of the United States
- List of sandwiches
- List of peanut dishes
