= Film (disambiguation) =

A film (also called a motion picture or movie) is a recorded sequence of images displayed on a screen at a rate sufficiently fast to create the appearance of motion.

In addition, the academic field of Film studies is often referred to as "Film" (as in having a "film major").

Film(s) may also refer to:

== Materials ==
- Film stock, the medium used for motion picture photography
- Photographic film, medium used to capture pictures with a camera, also X-ray film for radiography
- Microfilm, a kind of microform for archive storage
- Biological membrane, a thin layer in living organisms
- Biofilm, a group of microorganisms in which cells stick to each other on a surface
- Thin film, a layer of material ranging from fractions of a nanometer to several micrometers
- Thick-film technology for electronic components, besides thin-film
- Coating, a thin chemical covering
- Plastic film, thin plastic used in packaging and other industries
- Window film, thin plastic coating for filtering and other uses
- Paint protection film, protective coating
- Soap film, a thin layer of liquid surrounded by air

== Arts ==
- The Film (film), a Bollywood film by Junaid Memon
- Film (film), a 1965 film written by Samuel Beckett
- "Film", a Series F episode of the television series QI (2009)
- Film (band), a Croatian and Yugoslav rock band
- The Film (video), a video album by Yoasobi
- "film", a song by P-Model from the album Potpourri
- The Films, an American rock band
- "Films", a song by Gary Numan from the album The Pleasure Principle

== Film review ==
- Film (Iranian magazine), a film review magazine
- Film (Polish magazine), a film review magazine
- /Film (pronounced "slashfilm"), a film news and review blog
- Film... (TV programme), a BBC film review show that is renamed annually

== Television channels ==
- Film4
- TV 2 Film, a defunct Danish television channel
- TV 2 Filmkanalen, a defunct Norwegian television channel
- TV4 Film, a Swedish television channel

== Business ==
- Film industry

== Verb ==
- to film: to coat a surface
- to film: to record a motion picture
