= Flaim (surname) =

Flaim is a surname of Italian origin. Notable people with the surname include:

- Eric Flaim (born 1967), American speed skater
- Tony Flaim (1948–2000), Canadian blues singer
