= Waldorf pudding =

Type of dessert

- Type: Pudding
- Course: Dessert
- Main ingredients: Vanilla pudding, nutmeg, diced apples and sultana grapes

Waldorf pudding is a dessert originating from the early 20th century with two different published recipes. There is no known connection between Waldorf pudding and the Waldorf Hotel in New York City, which is credited with creating the Waldorf salad.

== The Waldorf pudding served on the Titanic ==
A dessert called Waldorf pudding was served to first class passengers on the RMS Titanic on April 14, 1912. The exact recipe for this dessert remains unknown and it may have been specific to White Star Line. Several speculated recipes using apples, walnuts, and raisins (which are the key ingredients of Waldorf salad) exist but there is no evidence that any of these ingredients were used in the Waldorf pudding served on the Titanic. The chefs at the Waldorf Hotel had never heard of Waldorf pudding around the time of the sinking of the Titanic.

A menu from Celebrity Cruises describes Waldorf pudding served on the RMS Olympic in 1914 as a creamy vanilla pudding flavored with a hint of nutmeg, diced apples and sultana grapes.
