= Flan =

Flan or Flans may refer to several culinary items, as well as other unrelated uses.

== Food ==
- Crème caramel, a baked custard dessert topped with a layer of clear caramel sauce; often called flan in many Spanish-speaking countries and internationally
- Flan (pie), an open, crust-based tart that may be sweet or savoury; commonly referred to as flan in the UK
- Flan cake, a sponge or pastry-based dessert that incorporates custard or flan-like fillings

== Numismatics ==
- Planchet (also called a flan), a blank metal disk that is struck to produce a coin

== Arts and media ==
- Flans, a Mexican female vocal trio active since the 1980s
- Flan (album), 1992, by American musician Dogbowl
- John Flansburgh, a member of the American alternative rock band They Might Be Giants

== See also ==
- Flam (disambiguation)
- Custard
- Tart
