= Jarrett Barrios =

American nonprofit organization executive and former politician

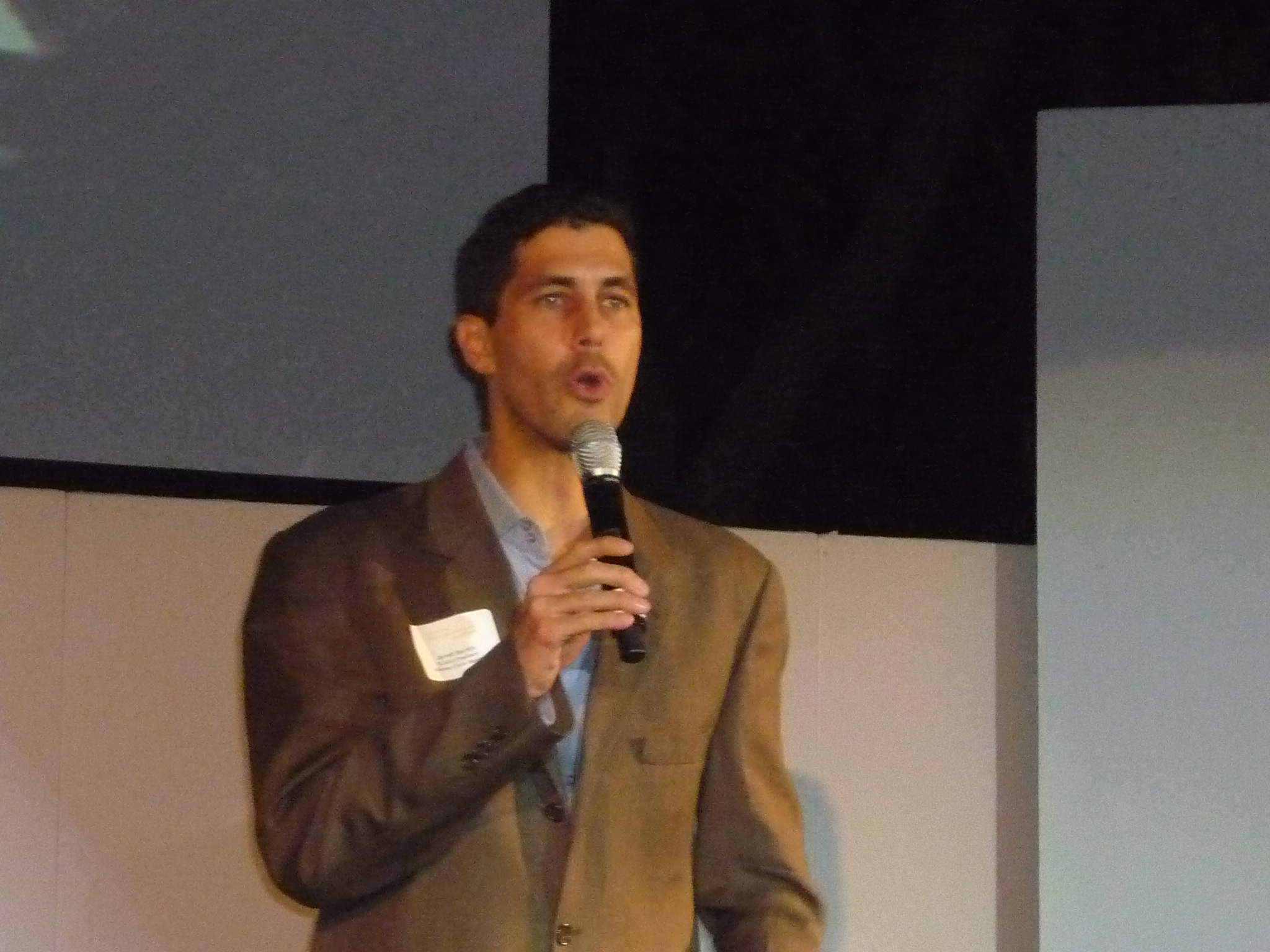

Member of the Massachusetts Senate from the Middlesex, Suffolk and Essex district
- In office January 2003 – July 2007
- Preceded by: Tom Birmingham
- Succeeded by: Anthony D. Galluccio

Member of the Massachusetts House of Representatives from the 28th Middlesex district
- In office January 1999 – December 2002
- Preceded by: Alvin Thompson
- Succeeded by: Edward G. Connolly

Personal details
- Party: Democratic
- Spouse: Doug Hattaway (divorced)
- Education: Harvard College (BA); Georgetown University (JD)

Jarrett Tomás Barrios is an American politician and activist. He was the chief executive officer (CEO) of the American Red Cross Los Angeles Region. Prior to this, he was the CEO of the American Red Cross of Massachusetts. Barrios was a member of both the Massachusetts House of Representatives and the Massachusetts Senate and became the first Latino and first openly gay man elected to the Massachusetts Senate. He subsequently was president of the Blue Cross and Blue Shield of Massachusetts Foundation and, later, of the Gay & Lesbian Alliance Against Defamation (GLAAD).

== Early life and education ==
The son of a Cuban-American carpenter and a Cuban-American social worker in Tampa, Florida, Barrios moved to Cambridge, Massachusetts at the age of 17 to study at Harvard College after graduating from Jefferson High School in Tampa. After graduating in 1990 with high honors and working for the Boston City Council, he earned his Juris Doctor degree with honors from Georgetown University. Eisenhower Fellowships selected Jarrett Barrios as a USA Eisenhower Fellow in 2009.

== Career ==
=== Massachusetts House ===
Barrios began his legislative career in 1998 when he was elected to the Massachusetts House of Representatives. The first major legislation he wrote was a law requiring hospital emergency rooms to provide interpreter services for non-English speakers. He also authored legislation creating a statewide affordable housing trust and establishing a low-income housing tax credit, which provides an incentive for developers to create affordable housing. He was the prime sponsor of a bill that enhanced state disaster relief efforts in coordination with the American Red Cross.

In 2002, the voters of the Middlesex, Suffolk and Essex District - including parts of Boston, Cambridge, Somerville, Everett, Revere, Chelsea and Saugus - elected him to the state Senate, and he was re-elected unopposed in both 2004 and 2006.

Barrios rose to national attention in 2006 when he proposed legislation to limit Marshmallow fluff in Massachusetts public schools after he learned his son's elementary school served Fluffernutters. In response, state rep Kathi-Anne Reinstein filed countersuit against this legislation by proposing the Fluffernutter be the state sandwich of Massachusetts. Barrios later dropped the proposal.

As a state senator, Barrios successfully helped lead the legislative effort to protect marriage equality in Massachusetts, and is best known for a globally televised speech where he spoke on discrimination faced by his own family.

Barrios chaired the Committee on Public Safety and Homeland Security. He authored legislation creating a state witness protection program and establishing an anti-gang violence grant program known as the Shannon Grant. He also authored one of the nation's most comprehensive identity theft laws, which provided new protections to consumers whose personal data is stolen from retailers or other third parties. Barrios wrote a law updating state fire codes in the wake of a deadly night club fire in neighboring Rhode Island. He also authored an "anti-bullying" bill, which only passed the state Senate, directing schools to respond more aggressively to student reports of violence and "cyber bullying."

On other issues, Barrios authored a law designed to protect homeowners from foreclosure and to crack down on unscrupulous subprime lenders. The law created a first-in-the-nation requirement that mortgage bankers and brokers abide by the state Community Reinvestment Act, which previously applied only to credit unions and banks. He led Senate passage of legislation promoting "environmental justice," addressing health care disparities among minorities, and strengthening enforcement of "buffer zones" around women's health facilities.

=== Subsequent politics ===
During the 2008 Democratic Party presidential primaries, Barrios endorsed the candidacy of Hillary Clinton.

=== Red Cross ===
After leaving political office, Barrios served as CEO of various regional chapters of the Red Cross in the US from 2011 to 2020. Barrio served as CEO of the American Red Cross of Massachusetts from 2011, before taking over as CEO of the Red Cross of Los Angeles on March 3, 2014. At the Massachusetts chapter, Barrios was credited with expanding and revitalizing the organization's mandate and leading it through two of Massachusetts' most serious disasters since the 1978 blizzard, namely the Boston Marathon bombings and blizzard Nemo in 2013. Since Barrios took the helm, the Red Cross of Massachusetts has expanded its volunteer base by 400 percent and doubled the number of Red Cross youth clubs in Massachusetts high schools.

== Other organizations ==
Barrios held leadership roles in several other organizations.

- Blue Cross Blue Shield of Massachusetts Foundation: On May 22, 2007, Barrios resigned from the Senate to become the president of the state's largest health foundation, the Blue Cross Blue Shield of Massachusetts Foundation. The foundation focuses on expanding access to health coverage and medical care for state residents. It plays a central role in the implementation of the state's universal health care program, providing data and analysis on the program's performance and convening health care stakeholders to address emerging issues. After arriving at the foundation, Barrios launched two new policy initiatives. The Care Beyond Coverage initiative is analyzing barriers to health care faced by people who have health insurance. The Community Health Mapping Project is linking data on health outcomes with environmental risk factors and other social determinants of health, such as violence and air quality.
- Barrios was president of GLAAD from September 2009 to June 2011, making him the only bilingual leader of a national LGBT organization. Several members of the board and Barrios resigned in 2011 after the organization was perceived to have improperly advocated for one of its corporate donors in AT&T's merger discussions with T-Mobile.

Barrios works in leadership roles in several nonprofit organizations.

- Planned Parenthood Action Fund in New York City. Barrios is on their board of directors.
- Massachusetts Center for Budget and Policy Priorities. Barrios is on their board of directors.
- Commonwealth Shakespeare Company. Barrios is on their board of directors.
- Latino Legacy Fund of The Boston Foundation. Barrios is an Advisory Committee member.

Barrios has also founded three nonprofit organizations.

- Oiste, a statewide Latino political organization, works to "create an educated and actively engaged Latino" community through grassroots organizing and civic education.
- Acceso, an international humanitarian organization, provides humanitarian outreach licensed by the U.S. government to the people of Cuba "who are struggling to obtain essential human goods such as medicine, medical supplies and reading materials."
- The Commonwealth Seminar, a professional training institute, "exists to open the doors of the Massachusetts State House to diverse leaders" through training, networking opportunities and access to public-service job opportunities.

Barrios was a co-author of the Dallas Principles.

== Personal life ==
Barrios was married to communications consultant and Democratic political operative Doug Hattaway from 2004 - 2010. He is now married to Danny Feldman, the executive/artistic director of the Pasadena Playhouse.

== See also ==
- 1999–2000 Massachusetts legislature
- 2001–2002 Massachusetts legislature
- 2003–2004 Massachusetts legislature
- 2005–2006 Massachusetts legislature
- 2007–2008 Massachusetts legislature
