= Flom (surname) =

Flom is a surname. Notable people with the surname include:

- Chaim Flom (died 2008), Israeli rabbi
- George T. Flom (1871–1960), American linguist and medievalist
- Jason Flom (born 1960/61), American music industry executive, podcaster, and philanthropist
- Joseph H. Flom (1923–2011), American lawyer
- Justin Flom (born 1986) American illusionist
