= Scotcheroos =

Dessert bar

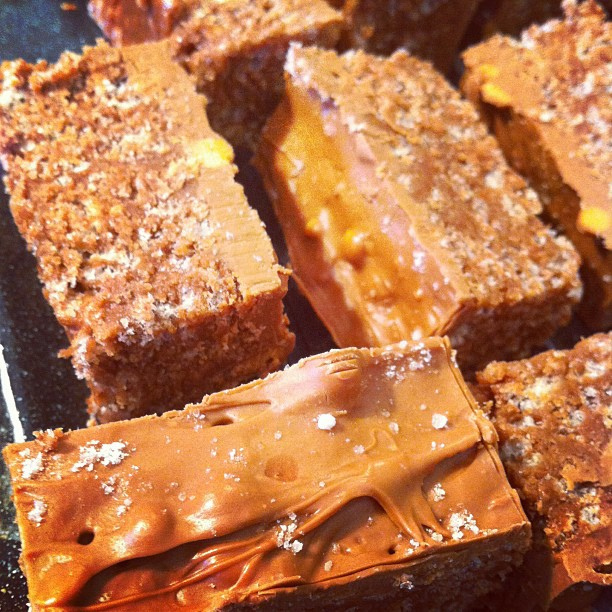
- Alternative names: Chocolate scotcheroos, Peanut butter scotcheroos
- Type: Dessert bar
- Place of origin: United States
- Main ingredients: Chocolate, butterscotch, peanut butter, Rice Krispies

Scotcheroos are dessert bars made with chocolate, butterscotch, peanut butter, corn syrup, and crisped rice. They are similar to Rice Krispies Treats, except that they contain peanut butter instead of marshmallows, and are topped with melted butterscotch chips and chocolate chips. In Minnesota, scotcheroos are known as Special K bars.

The recipe was originally printed on boxes of Rice Krispies breakfast cereal in the mid-1960s. Also called chocolate scotcheroos and peanut butter scotcheroos, they are popular in the Midwestern United States, especially Nebraska, Minnesota, Wisconsin, Iowa, South Dakota and North Dakota. They are commonly served at potlucks and parties due to their easy to make, no-bake nature.

In 2025, the Iowa State Fair hosted its first baking contest specifically for scotcheroos.

== Dietary restrictions ==
When made with plain crisped rice; Scotcheroos are a gluten-free dessert, so they are suitable for people with celiac disease or gluten intolerance.

They contain peanut butter, so they are not suitable for anyone with a peanut allergy.

== See also ==
- List of peanut dishes
