= Doug Hattaway =

American businessman (born 1964)

- Born: 1964 (age 61–62); Tallahassee, Florida, U.S.
- Education: Northwestern University (BA); Florida State University (MA)
- Spouse: Jarrett Barrios (divorced)

Doug Hattaway is an American communications consultant, political advisor, and businessman, currently serving as the founder and CEO of Hattaway Communications, Inc., a strategic communications firm based in Washington, D.C. Hattaway was a senior adviser to Hillary Clinton during the 2008 Democratic Party presidential primaries, as well as Al Gore’s spokesman during the 2000 United States presidential election. He was reported by The Washington Post to be on a short list of candidates to serve as White House Press Secretary in the Obama administration.

== Early life and education ==
Hattaway was born in 1964 and grew up in Tallahassee, Florida. He graduated from Northwestern University’s Medill School of Journalism in 1986 with a Bachelor of Science in Journalism and a major in Political Science. He received his Master of Arts in English from Florida State University.

== Career ==
From 1986 to 1989, Hattaway was press secretary to Representative Andy Ireland (R-FL), who had been elected in 1973 as a Democrat, but switched parties in 1984. Hattaway worked for Rep. Ireland when he was a member of the House Armed Services and Intelligence committees and co-chair of the Defense Burden Sharing Panel, which examined U.S. defense policy in Europe.

During the 1990s, he worked as a freelance correspondent, writing about politics, economics and environmental issues in South and Central America, Northern Ireland, and the Caribbean.

Hattaway served as press secretary for New Hampshire Governor Jeanne Shaheen from 1997 to 1999.

In 2000, Hattaway became the New Hampshire spokesman for the Al Gore 2000 presidential campaign during the primary against Senator Bill Bradley. He was then promoted to become the campaign’s national spokesman. He became the campaign’s primary voice during the Florida recount. After a controversial Supreme Court decision halted the recount, Hattaway told The New York Times, “If you count the voter’s intent, Gore wins. If you look for excuses not to count votes, Bush does better.”

After the 2000 election, Hattaway went to Capitol Hill to work for then-Senate Democratic Leader Tom Daschle as communications director, beginning work shortly before the September 11, 2001, terrorist attacks and was still in the position when Senator Daschle's Washington, D.C., office received a piece of mail containing anthrax. Hattaway told PRWeek, “I thought I had a good crisis communications experience after the Florida recount. Now I’ve got September 11 and anthrax. It’s not the kind of crisis management experience you want.”

His company, Hattaway Communications, serves high-profile clients in politics, government, advocacy, business and philanthropy, including the world's largest foundations. The firm's stated mission is to "help visionary leaders and organizations achieve ambitious goals that benefit people and the planet."

Hattaway has appeared frequently as an analyst and commentator on CNN and MSNBC.

== Personal life ==
Hattaway is openly gay, and was married to Jarrett Barrios, CEO of the American Red Cross Los Angeles Region and former member of the Massachusetts House of Representatives.
