= Marshmallow creme =

Confection spread made from marshmallow

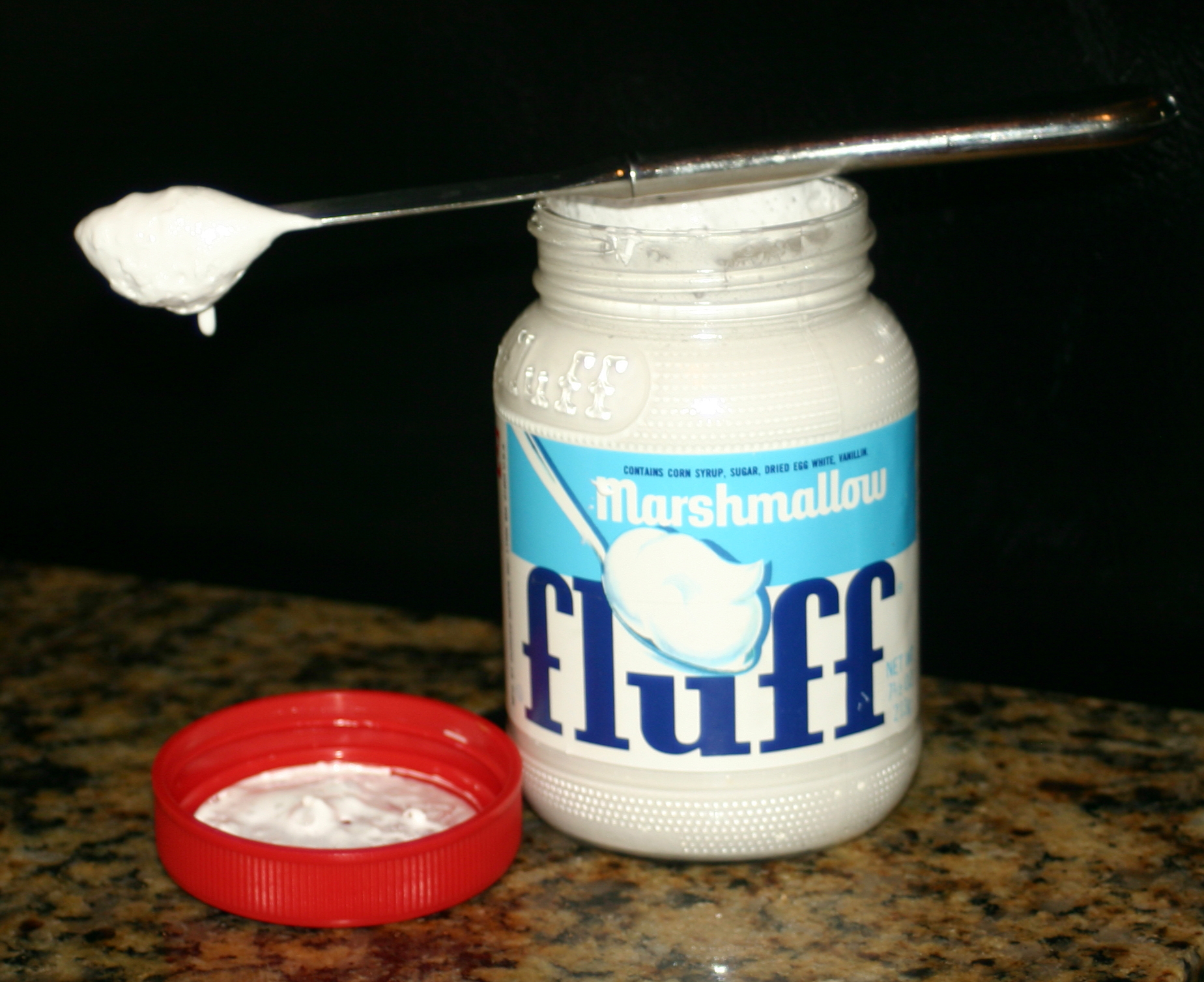
- Type: Confectionery
- Place of origin: United States
- Region or state: Massachusetts
- Main ingredients: corn syrup, sugar syrup, vanilla flavor, and egg white

Marshmallow creme (also called marshmallow fluff, marshmallow stuff, marshmallow spread, marshmallow paste, or simply fluff) is a marshmallow confectionery spread similar in flavor, but not texture, to regular solid marshmallow. One brand of marshmallow creme is Marshmallow Fluff, which is used to make the fluffernutter sandwich, a New England classic comfort food which debuted in 1918 in Massachusetts, just a year after marshmallow creme was invented.

== History ==
Many late-19th-century "marshmallow paste" recipes produced solid foods. The earliest mention of marshmallow creme in an American cookbook is from Fannie Farmer's Boston School Cook Book, printed in 1896. However, the author does not give a recipe for marshmallow cream in this book, instead giving a recipe for marshmallow paste in the cake filling section. In 1902, Mrs. Rorer's New Cook Book by Sarah Tyson Rorer describes her recipe for "marshmallow filling".

In 1910, ice cream company Limpert Brothers in Vineland, New Jersey created a product of the same name, intended as a dessert topping. The company is sometimes credited as the inventor of Marshmallow Fluff.

Around the beginning of the 20th century, Somerville, Massachusetts, resident and inventor of the product Archibald Query started selling his version door-to-door. He soon afterward sold the recipe to two candy makers in Swampscott, Massachusetts, H. Allen Durkee and Fred Mower, for $500. The product first hit market shelves in cans as Toot Sweet Marshmallow Fluff in 1917. The first two words were dropped soon after the packaging changed to a glass jar in the 1940s. Today, the Durkee-Mower company is one of only three companies in North America to produce marshmallow creme, the other products being Kraft Jet-Puffed Marshmallow Creme and Solo Marshmallow Creme. Fluff's ingredients include corn syrup, sugar syrup, vanilla flavor, and egg whites.

Fluff continues to be a regional tradition in the Northeastern United States. Since at least 2006, the city of Somerville has celebrated Query's original creation of Fluff with an annual festival in Union Square titled What the Fluff?. Typical activities at the festival have included Fluff-themed science fairs, a marshmallow launching robot from Somerville High School's FIRST Robotics team with their s'morebot, gallery shows, cooking contests, and carnival games. In 2011, actress Susan Olsen, most famous for portraying Cindy Brady on the Brady Bunch, attended the festival, where she sold her Fluff-inspired art.

== Uses ==
One popular use for marshmallow creme is in the "fluffernutter", a Fluff and peanut butter sandwich. In 2006, State Representative Kathi-Anne Reinstein planned to file a bill that would make the fluffernutter the official sandwich of Massachusetts.

Marshmallow creme is also a traditional confection in Arabic cuisine, where it is commonly referred to as soapwort meringue (natef). The original recipe is based on soapwort (roots of Saponaria officinalis) or roots of the marshmallow plant, but modern commercial varieties are nearly identical to marshmallow creme manufactured in North America. It was mentioned in a tenth-century Arabic cookbook, Kitab al-Ṭabīḫ (The Book of Dishes) by Ibn Sayyar al-Warraq.

== Health ==
According to a 2006 Boston Globe article, Massachusetts State Senator Jarrett Barrios proposed a restriction on the number of weekly servings of fluffernutter sandwiches in the form of an amendment to a bill that would limit junk food in schools. Attention on this issue was widespread, with news outlets as far as California reporting on the controversy. The proposal was later dropped.

== See also ==
- List of spreads – for bread & crackers.
- Meringue – Type of dessert or candy
