= Maraca pie =

Pie dessert originating from Florida

- Alternative names: Devil's rice pie
- Type: Pie
- Place of origin: United States
- Region or state: Tallahassee, Florida
- Created by: Berham and Jackson Moline
- Main ingredients: pastry base, sticky rice pudding, bananas, cinnamon
- Variations: Some recipes call for the inclusion of nutmeg, lime, mango, or apple

Maraca pie, also known as devil's rice pie, is a Floridian dessert pie made from sticky rice pudding and bananas inside a pastry base. Some versions of the recipe also include various different spices or fruits. It was created in 1957 by the Moline brothers of Tallahassee, Berham and Jackson.

Its name derives from the shape of the bakery's first tin, which was bent out of shape after Jackson dropped it onto the floor, giving it a shape reminiscent of a maraca. Because of this, bakeries around the city sell this pie for quinceañeras.

== See also ==
- List of pies
