= Omni Parker House =

Hotel in Boston, Massachusetts, United States

Coordinates: 42°21′29.50″N 71°03′35.07″W

Omni Parker House Hotel
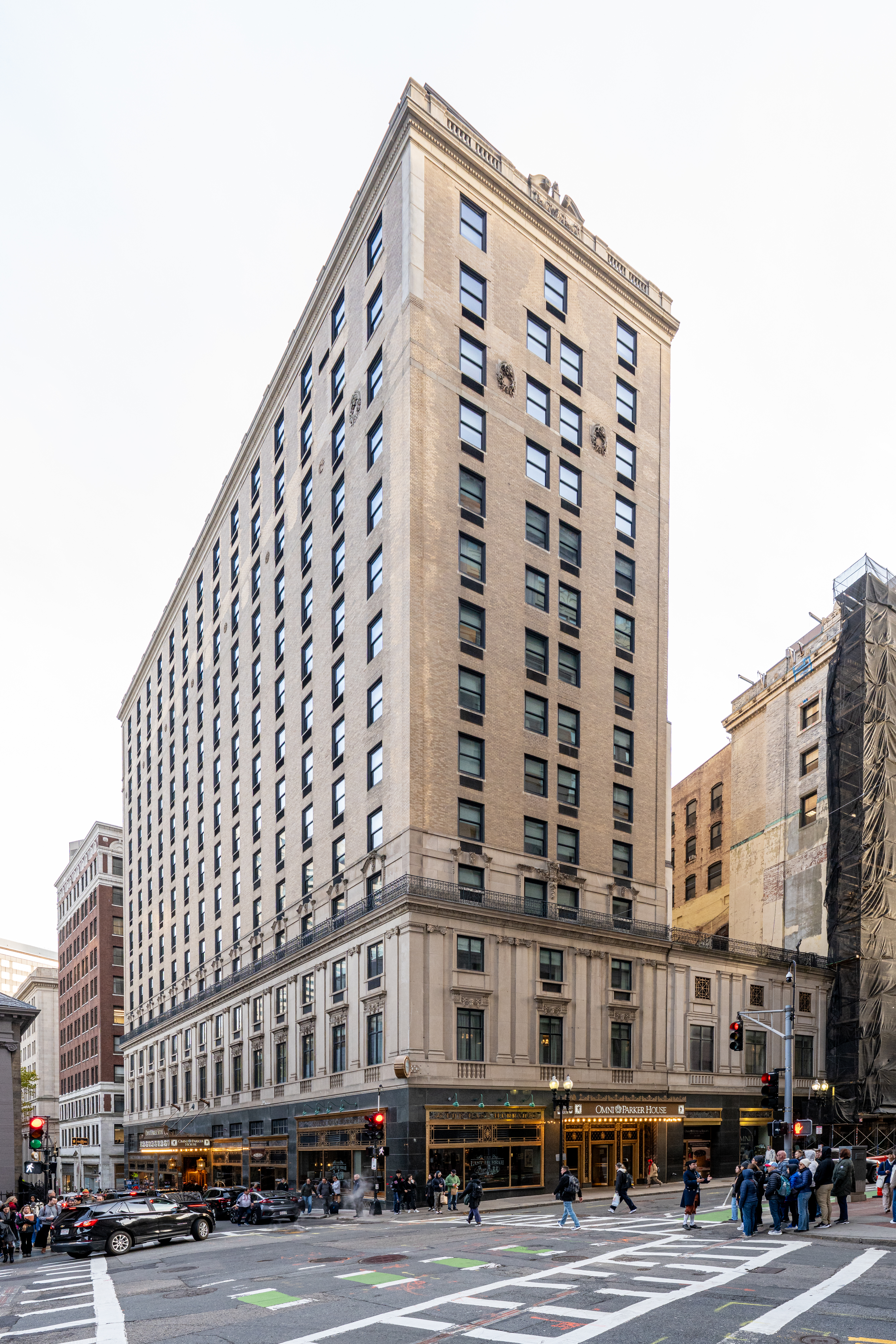
- Omni Parker House hotel in November 2025
- Hotel chain: Omni Hotels

General information
- Location: Boston, Massachusetts, 60 School Street
- Opening: 1855 (original hotel), 1927 (current building)
- Operator: Omni Hotels

Other information
- Number of rooms: 551

Website
- www.omnihotels.com/findahotel/bostonparkerhouse.aspx

The Omni Parker House is a historic hotel in Boston, Massachusetts, founded in 1855. The current hotel structure dates to 1927. Located at the corner of School Street and Tremont, not far from the seat of the Massachusetts state government, the hotel has long been a rendezvous for politicians. The Omni Parker House is a member of Historic Hotels of America, the official program of the National Trust for Historic Preservation, and is listed on the National Register of Historic Places.

== History ==
=== 19th century ===
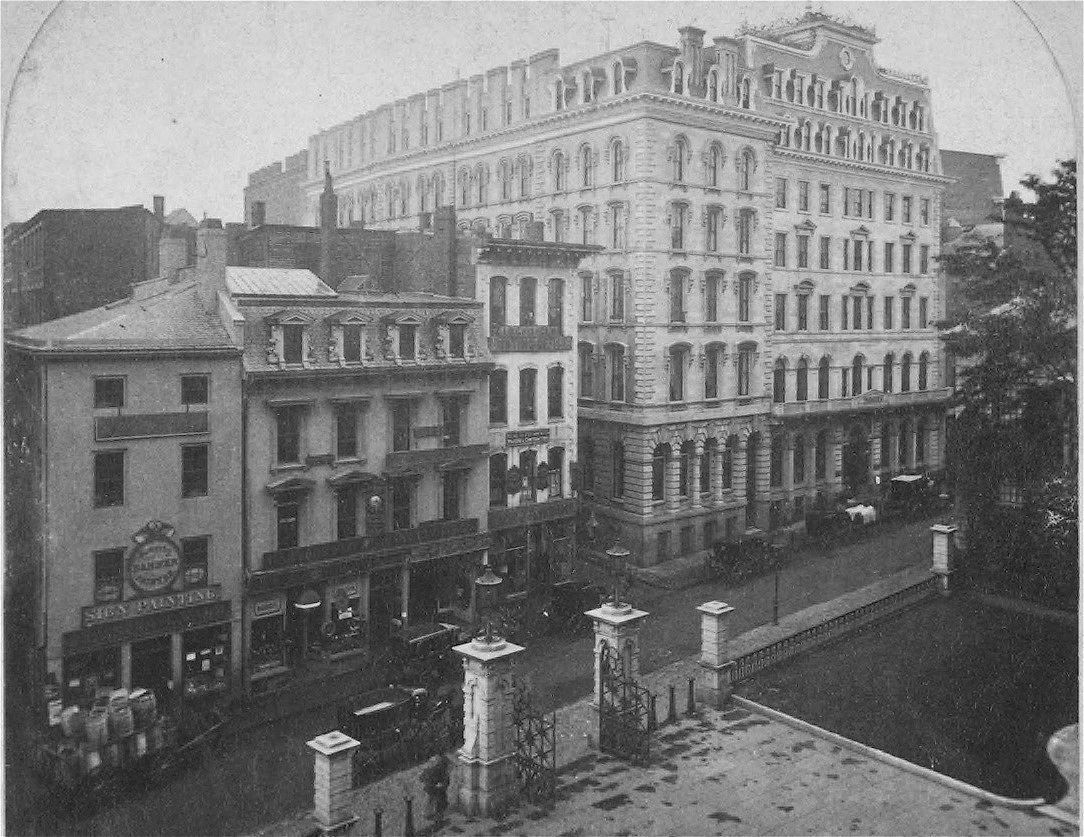
The Parker House as it looked in 1866, eleven years after opening

The Parker House Hotel was established by Harvey D. Parker and opened on October 8, 1855. Additions and alterations were made to the original building starting only five years after its opening.

The hotel was home to the Saturday Club, which met on the fourth Saturday of every month, except during July, August, and September. Among the Saturday Club's nineteenth-century members were poet, essayist, and preeminent transcendentalist Ralph Waldo Emerson, poet and The Atlantic Monthly editor James Russell Lowell, novelist Nathaniel Hawthorne, poets John Greenleaf Whittier and Henry Wadsworth Longfellow, diplomat Charles Francis Adams, historian Francis Parkman, philosopher, educator and abolitionist Amos Bronson Alcott and sage-about-town Dr. Oliver Wendell Holmes Sr.

Charles Dickens resided in the Parker House for five months in 1867–1868 in his own apartments; he first recited and performed "A Christmas Carol" for the Saturday Club at the Parker House, then again for an adoring public at nearby Tremont Temple. The Parker House kept the door to Dickens' guest room when he stayed in 1867 and the mirror used by him for rehearsals, both of which remain on display at the hotel.

The hotel introduced to America what became known as the European Plan. Prior to that time, American hotels had included meals in the cost of a room, and offered them only at set times. The Parker House charged only for the room, with meals charged separately and offered whenever the guest chose.

Actor John Wilkes Booth stayed at the hotel April 5–6, 1865, eight days before assassinating Abraham Lincoln. He was apparently in Boston to see his brother, actor Edwin Booth, who was performing there. While in Boston, Booth was seen practicing at a firing range near the Parker House.

Between 1866 and 1925, the hotel increased in size with new stories and additions, eventually expanding its footprint over 41,400 square feet of land—the bulk of the city lot bordered by Tremont, School, and Bosworth Streets and Chapman Place.

The Parker House created Massachusetts's state dessert, Boston Cream Pie; invented the Parker House roll; and coined the word "scrod," which is not a kind of fish, but a term for the freshest, finest, and youngest white fish of the day.

Jacques Offenbach stayed at the hotel during an 1876 tour of the U.S., and, inspired by the rolls, sang a tune to friends as a joke. He would later use it as a theme in his opera, The Tales of Hoffmann.

On May 31, 1884, when founder Harvey Parker died at the age of 79, he was buried in Mount Auburn Cemetery, the “permanent home” of many of Boston's most prestigious people. The ambitious Maine farm boy who arrived in Boston almost penniless in 1825, died with a net worth of $1,272,546.94. Parker's will granted $100,000 to Boston's new Museum of Fine Arts, and provided the foundation for its Print Department.

The hotel passed to Parker's partners, Edward O. Punchard and Joseph H. Beckman until 1891, when Joseph Reed Whipple assumed control. To provide his Boston diners with the freshest and finest food products available, Whipple established his own 2,500-acre dairy farm in New Boston, New Hampshire. Valley View Farm was divided into Dairy, Piggery, and Hennery Departments, employing some ninety people. In order to make daily deliveries to Boston, Whipple helped build a railroad depot in New Boston and connected it to existing main lines with a spur track later leased to the Boston & Maine Railroad.

=== 20th century ===
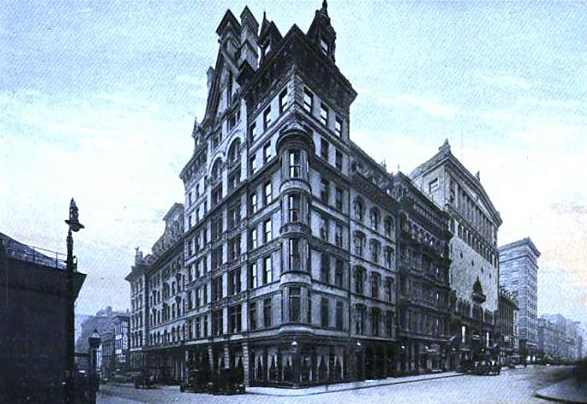
The Parker House in 1910, showing a later extension, with the earlier wings behind it on the left

The original Parker House building and later architectural additions were demolished in the mid-1920s. They were replaced in 1927 with the current building. One wing of the nineteenth-century hotel remained open until the new building was completed in 1927, enabling the hotel to lay claim to being "America's oldest operating hotel". The hotel was seized by its creditors during the Great Depression and sold by the bank to Glenwood Sherrard in 1933.

James Michael Curley, the charismatic, Irish-American "Mayor of the Poor" who dominated Boston politics for the first half of the twentieth century, was a constant presence at the Parker House, in part because Old City Hall stood directly across from the hotel on School Street. The Omni Parker House bar, The Last Hurrah, was named for Edwin O'Connor's 1956 novel of the same name, a thinly disguised chronicling of Mayor Curley's colorful life.

John F. Kennedy announced his candidacy for Congress at the Parker House in 1946 and also held his bachelor party in the hotel's Press Room there in 1953. Then Senator Kennedy also proposed to his future wife, Jackie Bouvier, at Table 40 in Parker's Restaurant located inside the hotel.

The hotel was bought by Dunfey Hotels in 1968. Inspired by the nineteenth-century Saturday Club, the Dunfeys in 1974 founded the New England Circle, purposeful gatherings of activists from a variety of backgrounds and experiences designed to advance civil and civic dialogue and inspire constructive community change. In 1983, Dunfey Hotels bought Omni Hotels and reorganized itself, with the Dunfey name phased out and the Parker House placed in the Omni division. In 1996, the Omni Hotels chain and its properties, including the Parker House, were sold to TRT Holdings, owned by Texas billionaire Robert Rowling.

=== 21st century ===
The hotel was temporarily closed to guests during the COVID-19 pandemic in 2020, but continues to be the longest continuously operating hotel in the US, because staff continued to maintain the property and respond to guest inquiries for future reservations during this period.

The hotel currently has 551 rooms and suites. In 2009, AAA named the hotel one of the top 10 historic U.S. hotels. The Omni Parker House is a member of the National Trust for Historic Preservation's Historic Hotels of America program.

==== 2024 strike ====
On October 14, 2024, unionized workers at Omni Parker House went on strike as part of a citywide effort to secure a new collective bargaining agreement with all union hotels in Boston. On October 20, 2024, the workers at Omni Parker House unanimously voted to approve a new contract and returned to work the following day.

==== 2025 renovation and rebirth ====
In November 2024, the hotel commenced a major renovation of all guestrooms, function spaces and the main lobby. This $65 million project was completed in August 2025.

== Parker's Restaurant ==
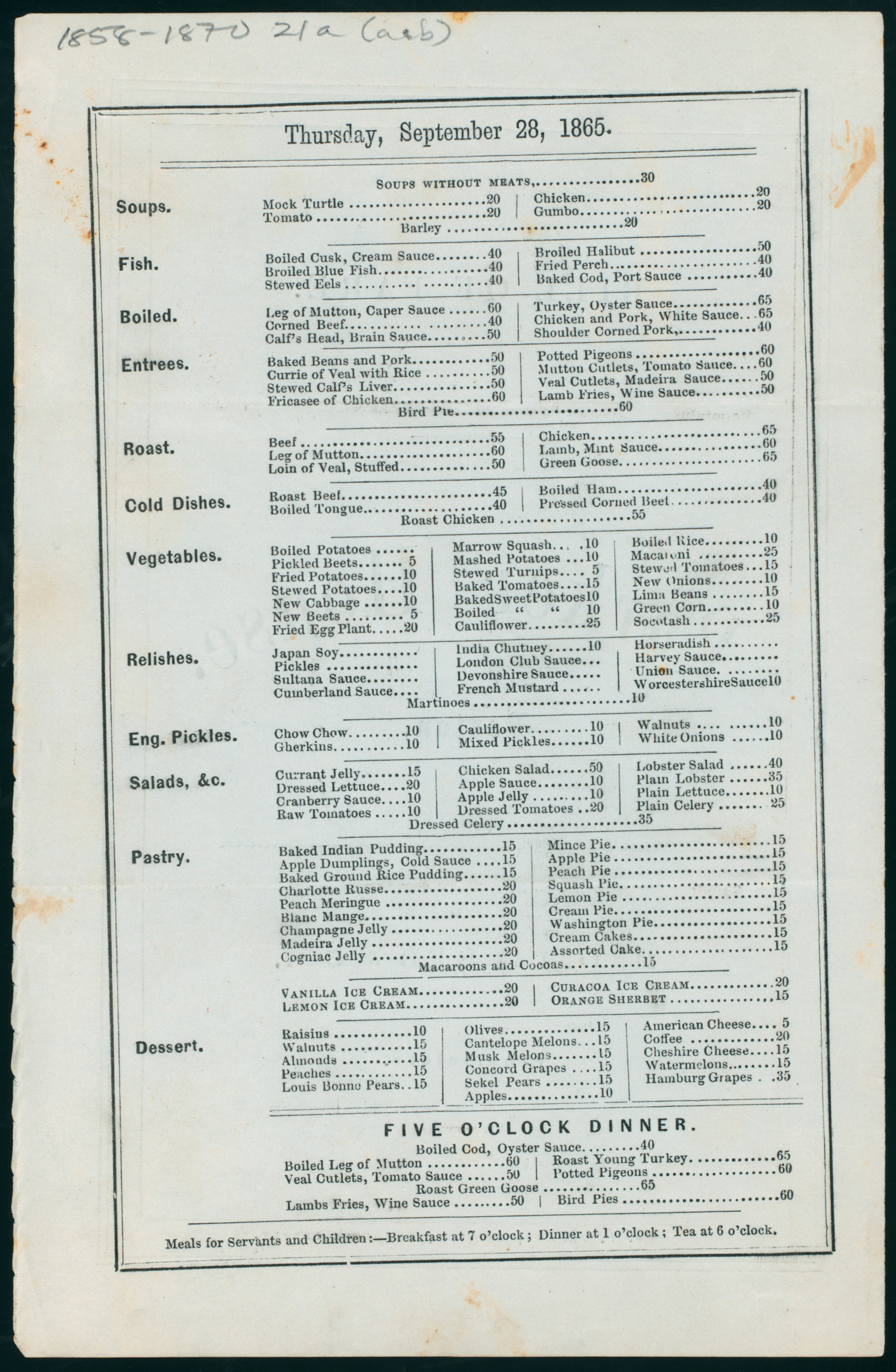
Daily dinner menu at Parker's Restaurant in 1865

Parker's Restaurant predates the historic Parker House Hotel by 22 years. Harvey D. Parker, a coachman for a Watertown woman, frequently dined in a cellar cafe owned by John E. Hunt whenever he visited Boston. In 1832, Parker purchased the cafe from Hunt for $432 and renamed it Parker's Restaurant. The restaurant quickly became famous for its food and excellent service and gained popularity with businessmen, lawyers, and newspapermen. In 1847, Parker took on a business partner, John F. Mills. By 1854, the two purchased a former mansion, built by merchant John Mico, which would be renovated into the luxury hotel.

=== Culinary accomplishments ===
The restaurant is famous for the invention of multiple iconic foods. The Boston cream pie and Parker rolls were first created in the Parker House Restaurant kitchen. In 1856, Parker hired the gourmet French chef Augustine Anezin to run Parker's restaurant for an annual salary of $5,000. Anezin's salary was astonishingly high for the time considering most cooks in Boston made approximately $416 annually. With Anezin as the head chef, the restaurant quickly became an upscale culinary destination for Boston elite. A typical menu from the chef could include mock turtle soup, boiled turkey in oyster sauce, ham in champagne, and much more. In 1856, Anezin reportedly invented the Boston cream pie, originally called Chocolate Cream Pie or Parker House Chocolate Cream Pie. The original recipe had more distinctly French details, like a rum glaze brushed onto the cake layers and slivered almonds around the sides.

In the 1860s a German baker working at the Parker House Restaurant created Parker House rolls, commonly known as Parker rolls. The legend says an angry baker threw a tray of unfinished rolls in the oven after an argument with a hotel guest. When he took the rolls out, they were puffy on the inside and crispy and buttery on the outside with a distinct folded shape. The popularity of the bread generated many copycat recipes, the oldest of which was printed in an April 1874 edition of the New Hampshire Sentinel. However, the official recipe remained a secret until 1933 when U.S. President Franklin D. Roosevelt requested they be served at a White House dinner.

== Famous employees ==
Malcolm X, then going by the name Malcolm Little, worked as a busboy at the hotel in the 1940s. Emeril Lagasse served as sous-chef in the Parker kitchens from 1979 to 1981.

Ho Chi Minh claimed in a 1913 postcard to be working as a baker at the hotel, though this has not been corroborated by hotel records.

== In literature and music ==
For more than 150 years, the Parker House has appeared in prose and poetry set in and around Boston.

Although many "haunting" books and "ghost tours" claim that Stephen King's 1999 short story 1408—about a writer who experiences a haunted stay at a New York hotel called the Dolphin—was based on Room 303 of the Parker House and the supernatural events surrounding the room, King's personal assistant says that claim is false.

In March 1877, humorist Mark Twain was staying at the Parker House in room 168. and observed to a reporter, "You see for yourself that I'm pretty near heaven—not theologically, of course, but by the hotel standard." Twain's quote inspired the title for the definitive history of the Parker House, Heaven, By Hotel Standards, written by Susan Wilson. The third edition was published in 2024.

== See also ==
- Harvey D. Parker (1805–1884), founder of the Parker House
