= Saturday Club (Boston, Massachusetts) =

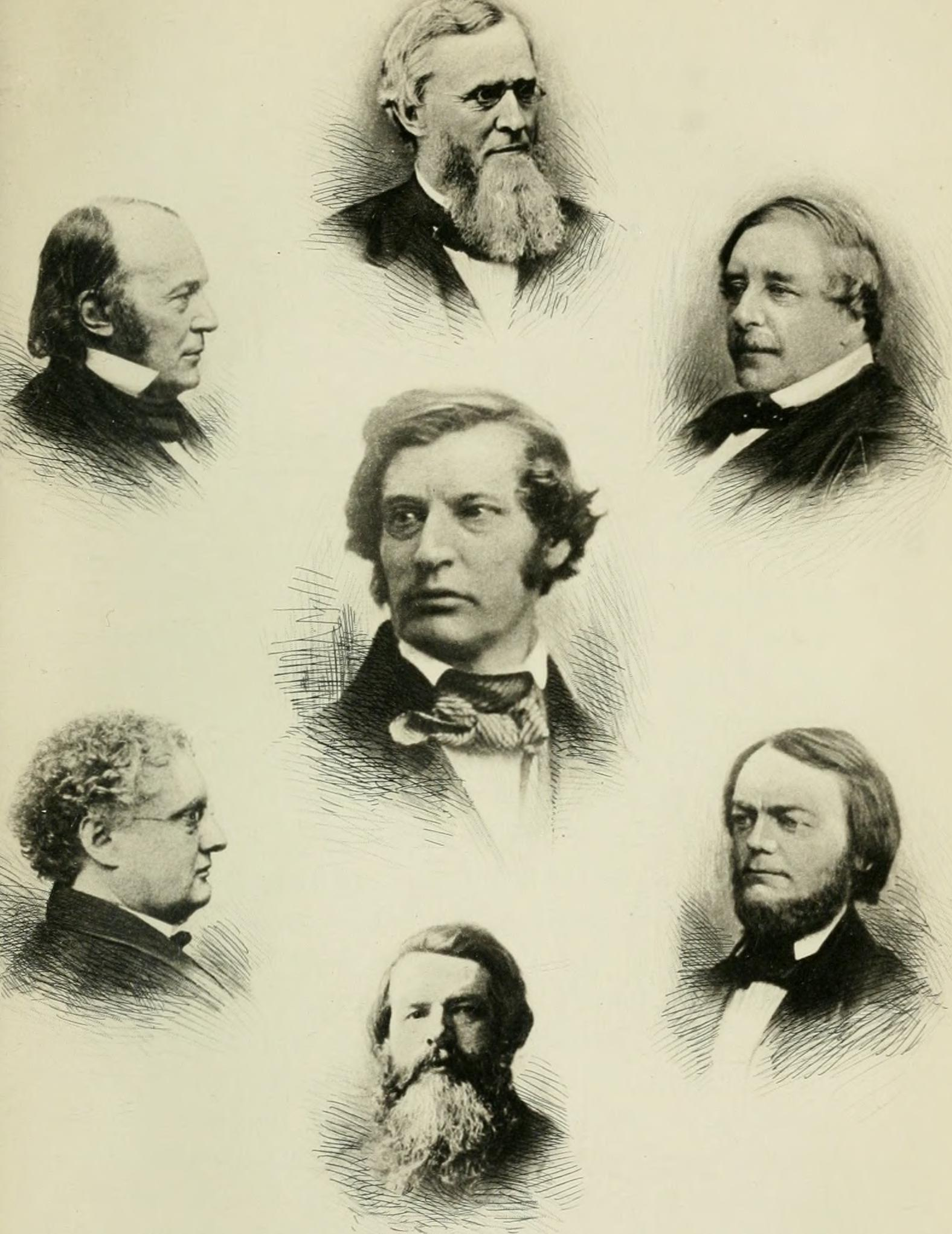
"A Group of the Saturday Club", from Life and Letters of Oliver Wendell Holmes, 1896

The Saturday Club, established in 1855, was an informal monthly gathering in Boston, Massachusetts, of writers, scientists, philosophers, historians, and other notable thinkers of the mid-19th century.

== Overview ==
The club began meeting informally at the Albion House in Boston. Publishing agent and lawyer Horatio Woodman first suggested the gatherings among his friends for food and conversation. By 1856, the organization became more structured with a loose set of rules, with monthly meetings held over dinner at the Parker House. The Parker House served as their place of meeting for many years. It was a hotel built in 1855 by Harvey D. Parker.

The gatherings led to the creation of the Atlantic Monthly, to which many of the members contributed. The name was suggested by early member Oliver Wendell Holmes Sr.

The original members of the group included Woodman, Louis Agassiz, Richard Henry Dana Jr., Ebenezer Rockwood Hoar, George Frisbee Hoar, and James Russell Lowell. In the following years, membership was extended to Holmes, Cornelius Conway Felton, Henry Wadsworth Longfellow, and William Hickling Prescott. Other members included Ralph Waldo Emerson, Amos Bronson Alcott, Asa Gray, John Lothrop Motley, Benjamin Peirce, Charles Sumner, John Greenleaf Whittier, Edward Waldo Emerson, and others. Invitations to the group were considered a sort of affirmation of acceptance into Boston's high society. Ohio-native William Dean Howells was invited by James Russell Lowell in 1860 and recalled in a memoir that it seemed like a rite of passage. Holmes joked that Howells's presence served as "something like the apostolic succession... the laying on of hands". A few years later, Howells was named editor of the Atlantic Monthly, which published many of the works by members of the group.

In 1884, Oliver Wendell Holmes published a poem titled "At the Saturday Club" in which he reminisced about the gatherings. By then, many of its members were dead. Ralph Waldo Emerson's son, Edward Waldo Emerson, published two books about the Saturday Club and its members in the early 20th century. A version of the Saturday Club still exists in Boston.

== Gallery ==
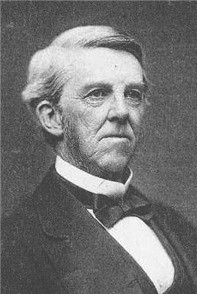
Oliver Wendell Holmes

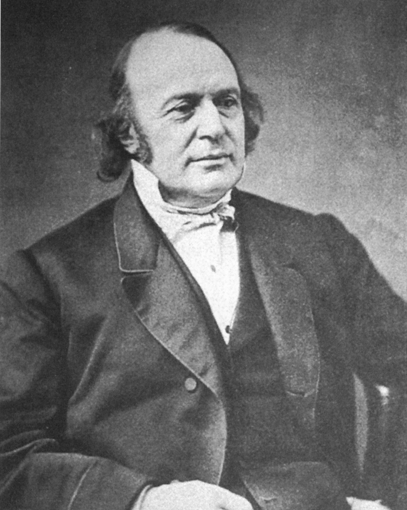
Louis Agassiz

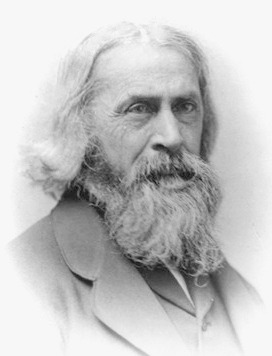
Benjamin Peirce

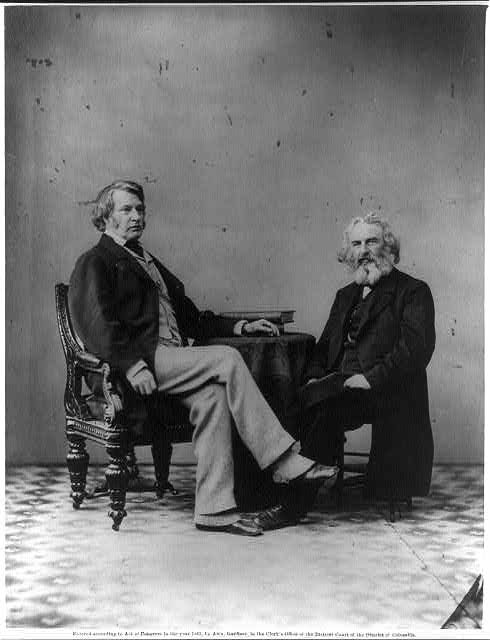
Charles Sumner and Henry Wadsworth Longfellow, 1863

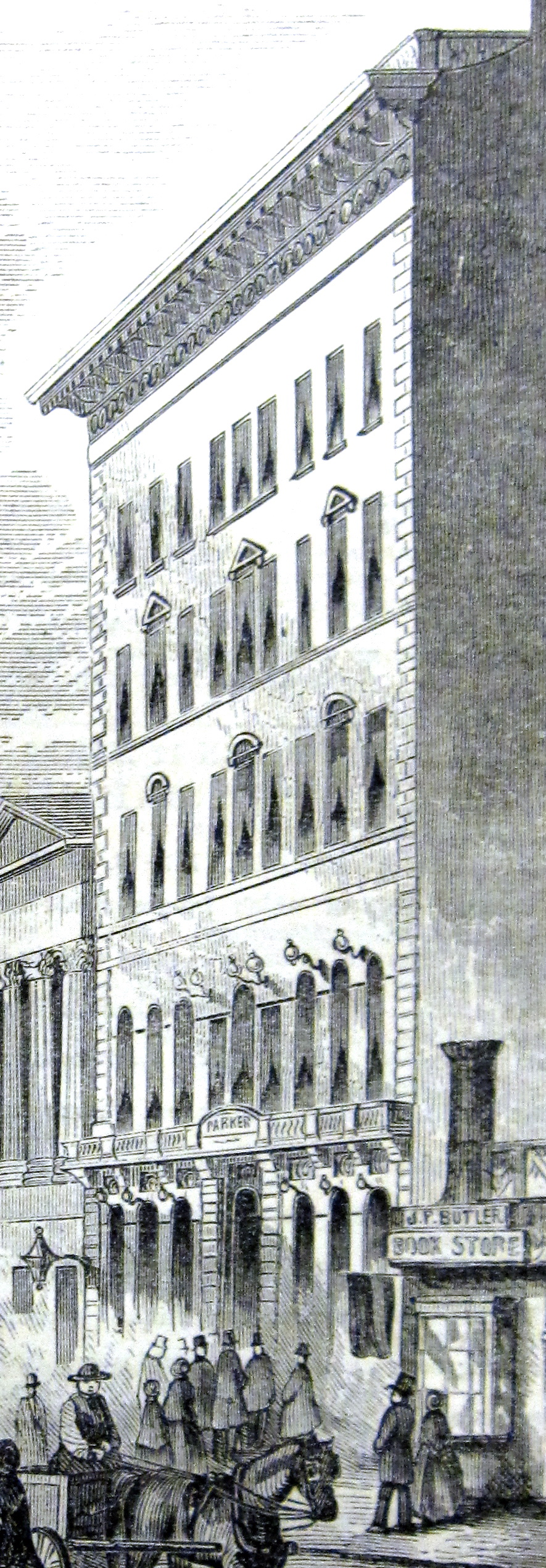
Parker's, School Street, Boston, 1855

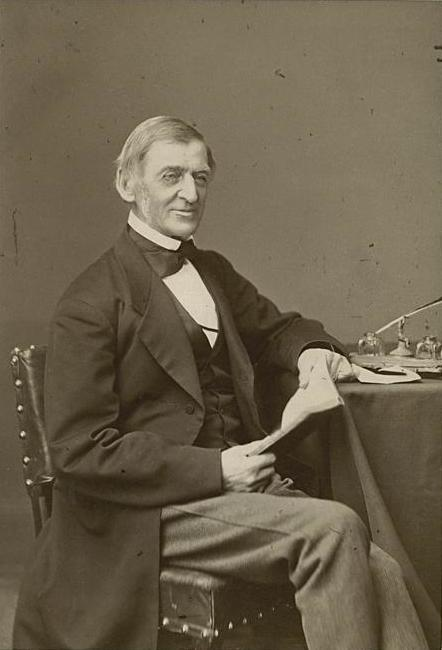
Ralph Waldo Emerson, ca.1872

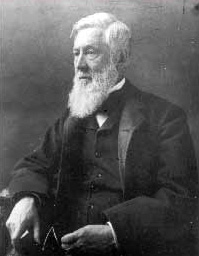
Asa Gray

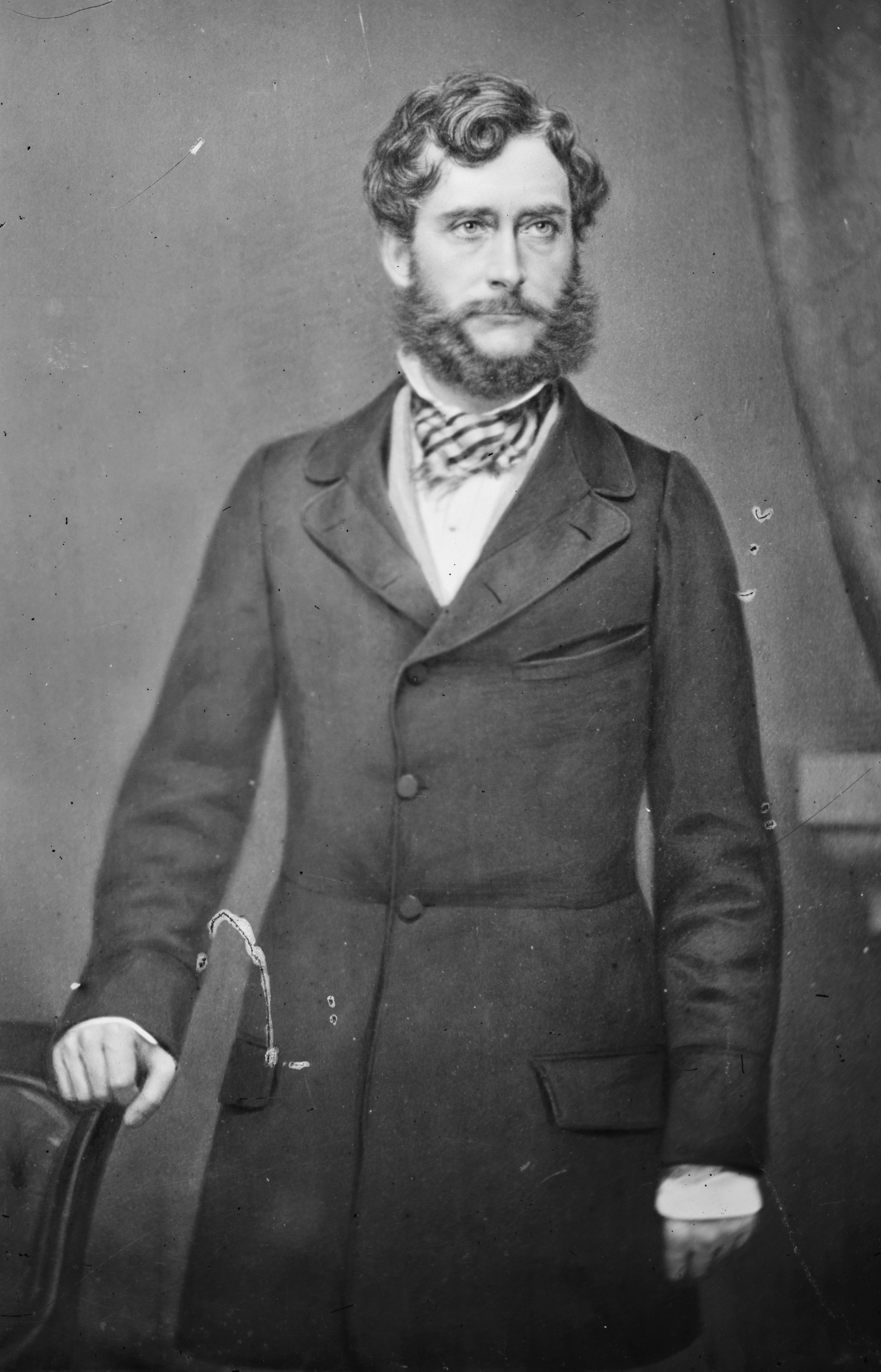
John Lothrop Motley, ca.1860
