= Constitution Center (Washington, D.C.) =

Office building in Washington, DC, US

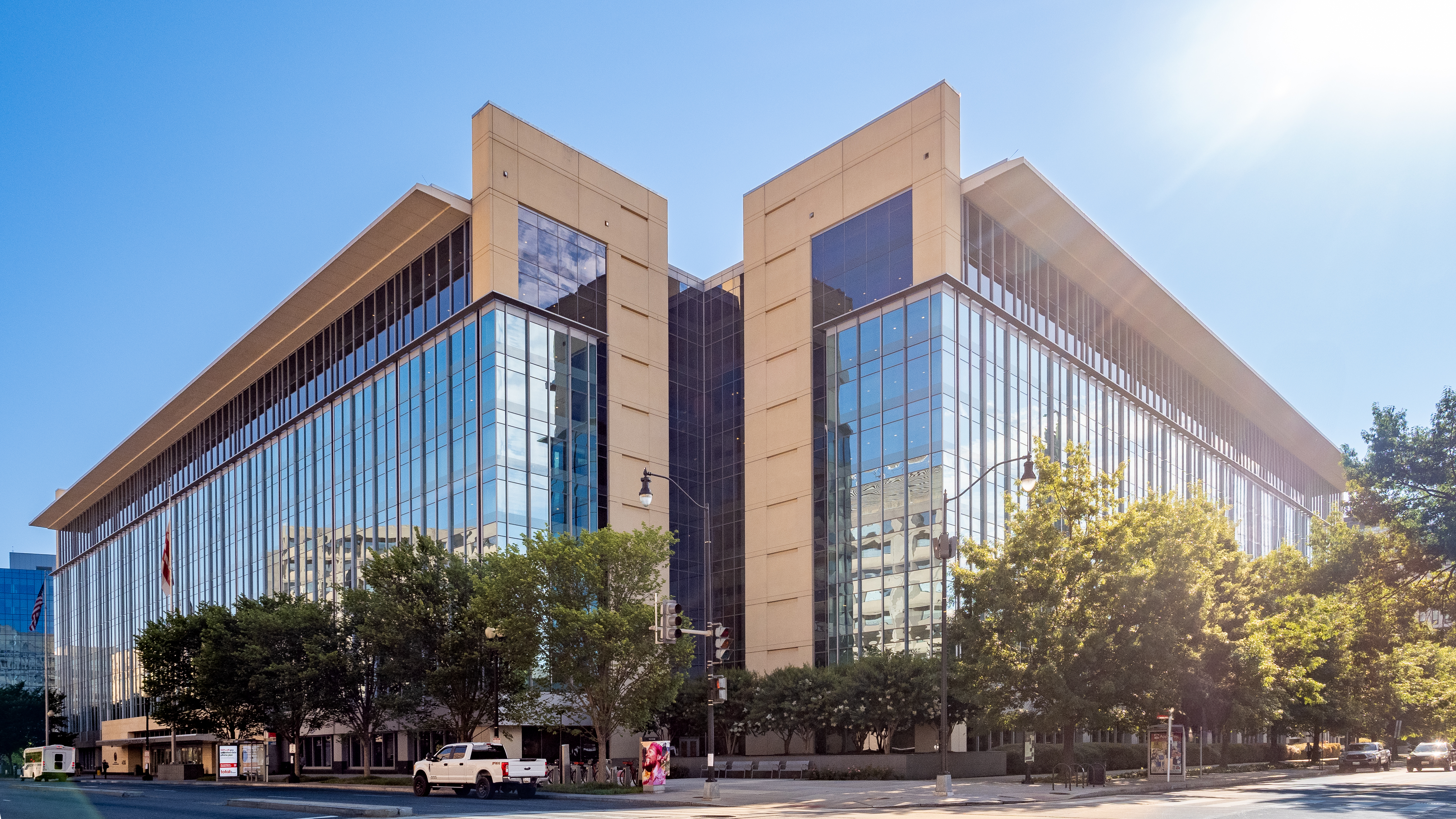
- Former names: David Nassif Building

General information
- Type: Office
- Location: 400 7th Street SW, Washington, D.C., U.S.
- Coordinates: 38°53′01″N 077°01′19″W
- Construction started: 1968
- Completed: 1969
- Cost: $26.5 million (1969); $220 million (2006 renovation)
- Owner: Nassif Associates

Height
- Roof: 140 feet (43 m)

Technical details
- Floor count: 10
- Floor area: 1,400,000 sq ft (130,000 m^{2})

Design and construction
- Architects: Edward Durrell Stone (1969); SmithGroup (2006)
- Developer: David Nassif, Sr.
- Main contractor: Volpe Construction (1969); Davis Construction (2006)

The Constitution Center, formerly known as the David Nassif Building, is an office building located at 400 7th Street SW in Washington, D.C. It is 140 feet (43 m) high and has 10 floors. Covering an entire city block, it is the largest privately owned office building in Washington, D.C. Current tenants include the Federal Housing Finance Agency and the Office of the Comptroller of the Currency. As of February 2014, Constitution Center was worth $725.8 million, making it the most valuable taxable property in the city.

== Original structure ==
In the 1950s, the U.S. Congress, then the governing institution of the District of Columbia, undertook the Southwest D.C. urban renewal project, the first in the capital district and one of the earliest such programs in the nation. In 1946, Congress passed the District of Columbia Redevelopment Act, which established the District of Columbia Redevelopment Land Agency (RLA) and provided legal authority to clear land and funds to spur redevelopment in the capital. Congress also gave the National Capital Planning Commission (NCPC) the authority to designate which land would be redeveloped and how. However, the RLA was not funded until the passage of the Housing Act of 1949. A 1950 study by the NCPC found that the small Southwest quarter of the city suffered from high concentrations of old and poorly maintained buildings, overcrowding, and threats to public health (such as lack of running indoor water, sewage systems, electricity, central heating, and indoor toilets). Competing visions for the redevelopment ranged from renovation to wholesale leveling of neighborhoods, but the latter view prevailed as more likely to qualify for federal funding. Original plans called for the demolition of almost all structures in Southwest Washington beginning in 1950, but legal challenges led to piecemeal razing of the area until the mid-1950s.

Issues surrounding the planning and construction of L'Enfant Plaza (immediately to the west of the site) delayed the construction of any buildings on the block until the late 1960s. In 1963, the RLA purchased the land from the Westminster Memorial Church, Fifth Baptist Church, and homeowners. The United States Department of Health, Education and Welfare wished to purchase the site for its new headquarters, but the RLA declined to sell the property. (The federal government does not pay taxes on land and structures it owns, and the RLA wanted a private owner who would add to the tax base.) The RLA attempted to sell the land on January 29, 1965, but there were no buyers.

The building was constructed under an agreement between the General Services Administration (GSA) and Boston developer David Nassif, Sr. In July 1965, President Lyndon B. Johnson began planning to unite various disparate transportation agencies into a new United States Department of Transportation. GSA (the property owner and manager for the U.S. federal government) began seeking to lease or build a structure to house the new agency in late 1965. Donald T. Kirwan, chief of GSA's leasing division, knew Nassif from a previous lease negotiation and discussed the siting of a building and its size with him. Nassif approached the RLA on April 21, 1966, and asked to buy the newly razed block of land bounded by 6th, 7th, D, and E Streets SW. In May 1967, GSA sent a letter to Nassif advising him that it was likely to lease the entire structure he intended to build. The $5.9 million land purchase was finalized on October 30, 1967. The cost of the structure is unclear. On November 15, 1967, Nassif had secured a $39 million construction loan. But The Washington Post pegged the cost of the building at $27 million in July 1968. The newspaper said in August 1970 that the structure cost was $26.5 million. The building was designed by architect Edward Durrell Stone, who also designed the John F. Kennedy Center for the Performing Arts. On April 11, 1968, GSA leased the entire building from Nassif for 20 years for $98 million. John A. Volpe Construction was the chief contractor.

Construction began in July 1968 (although it was delayed for a very short time when unionized ironworkers at the site went on strike) and was completed in 1969. The main entrance faced 7th Street SW. It included a central courtyard (open to the sky) featuring a fountain, footpaths, benches, and landscaping. Four 15-foot (4.6 m) high arcades pierced the building in the center of the block on each side, creating access to the courtyard. The facade's vertical marble ribs were obtained from the same quarry near Carrara, Italy, that provided the marble for the Kennedy Center. The finished building had ten floors, three basement floors, overhanging eaves, and 2,500,000 square feet (230,000 m^{2}) of space (1,019,000 square feet (94,700 m^{2}) of usable space). It was the city's largest privately owned office building at the time.

Kirwan's contacts with Nassif later became the subject of a legal investigation. Kirwan not only shared inside information with Nassif about the leasing plans of the GSA, he later invested in Nassif's D.C. business and became an officer in it. This relationship (Kirwan left GSA in December 1966, before the letter indicating an intention to lease was sent to Nassif) and GSA's irregular leasing of the building became public knowledge in August 1970. An internal GSA audit was critical of the leasing process and the costs of the lease.

That same month, refinancing of the building was called into question. In the U.S., it is common business practice for the initial lender to provide an interim loan (the "construction loan") to build a building. The interim loan is then paid off by a second lender, who becomes the mortgage lender and receives payments from the building's owner. Riggs Bank, a local D.C. bank, provided Nassif with an interim construction loan. The New York City Employees Retirement System was to have paid off this construction loan. That payment was halted when the loan officer Nassif had dealt with was indicted for taking bribes to approve loans. When the pension fund refused to provide the loan, Riggs Bank sued for payment and threatened to foreclose on the Nassif Building.

From 1969 until 2007, the Nassif Building served as the headquarters of the U.S. Department of Transportation (DOT). The building was designed to have removable interior walls to permit easy reconfiguration of the interior space. In November 1970, the federal government exercised its powers of eminent domain. It seized control of the three-story basement parking garage from Nasif to provide inexpensive parking for DOT workers. Over the years, so many government workers complained of ailments while working in the structure that some believed it suffered from sick building syndrome. David Nassif Associates, owner of the building, disputed these claims. However, when the Department of Transportation announced it would leave the building in 2000, the owners promised a $100 million renovation that included a new air ventilation and cleaning system as an inducement for the agency to stay. The owners also unsuccessfully sued the General Services Administration in 1999 to force it to renew the federal lease on the building. The Department of Transportation completed its move out of the Nassif Building and into its new headquarters in June 2007.

The L'Enfant Plaza Metro station opened an escalator entrance in the structure's north arcade on July 1, 1977. The entrance was one of two that opened that day (Metro Blue Line's opening day). The third entrance (inside the L'Enfant Promenade underground shopping center at L'Enfant Plaza) opened in October 1977. In June 1992, Virginia Railway Express opened the $1.1 million VRE L'Enfant Station on Virginia Avenue SE (about a half block north of Constitution Center).

== Renovation ==
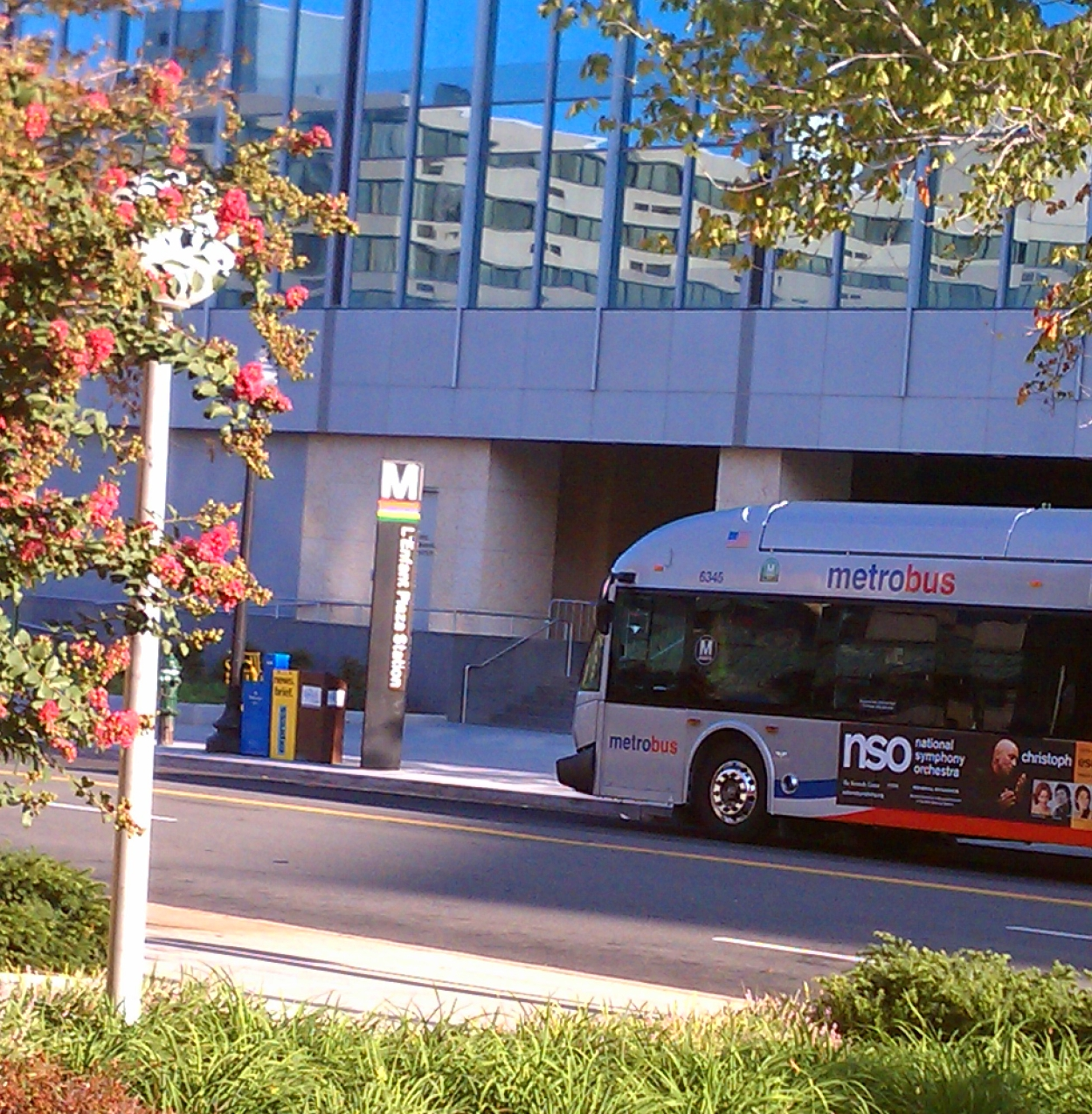
Entrance to the L'Enfant Plaza Metro station on the north side of the newly renovated and renamed Constitution Center

In 2006, Nassif Associates announced a $220 million renovation of the building and renamed it "Constitution Center". SmithGroup was the architectural firm overseeing the redesign, and Davis Construction oversaw the construction.

The renovation included some of the highest security features of any building in the D.C. area. They included a central and perimeter security system; closing of the central plaza of the building, which, along with other changes, increased its interior footage by 80,000 square feet (7,400 m^{2}); steel-jacketed underground parking garage columns capable of withstanding a powerful explosion; six fully staffed security screening points; concrete blockades built into the façade; communication, potable water, and utilities contained in blast-proof spaces; ventilation shafts for the parking garage in a secure area; and special security procedures to obtain access to the building's critical systems. The security enhancements made the office building suitable for all federal agencies except for the United States Department of Defense. The 700,000-square-foot (65,000 m^{2}) underground parking garage contains 1,500 spaces.

Several amenities were also added to the building. These included a 10,000-square-foot (930 m^{2}), 400-seat auditorium on the courtyard/plaza level; a six-room, 11,000 square feet (1,000 m^{2}) conference center which can accommodate meetings of 10 to 500 people; a full-service cafeteria on the plaza level, with access to the courtyard; and a fitness center for 100 people.

The exterior of the building was also radically changed. The celebrated key visual feature of the building, its exterior vertical white marble ribbing, was completely removed after it was found to be bowed from age and weather. Although this fundamentally changed the nature of Durrell's building, there was almost no public outcry. It was replaced by an energy-efficient, all-glass facade. Perhaps the most significant renovation feature was the structure's use of a chilled beam HVAC system, which uses chilled or heated water circulated in strategically placed columns in the interior space to cool and warm the building. To test the efficiency of the chilled beam technology, the system was installed in the penthouse of the building and tested for a full year. The architect agreed to use the system after the test outperformed specifications. The installation represented the first large-scale use of the chilled beam technology in the United States. Other energy-saving enhancements included motion and daylight detectors to turn lights off when not needed, and special exterior windows that automatically dim to prevent daytime heating. The building's ventilation system was also upgraded. The renovation left the structure with 1,400,000 square feet (130,000 m^{2}) of interior space. The final cost of the renovation was pegged at $250 million.

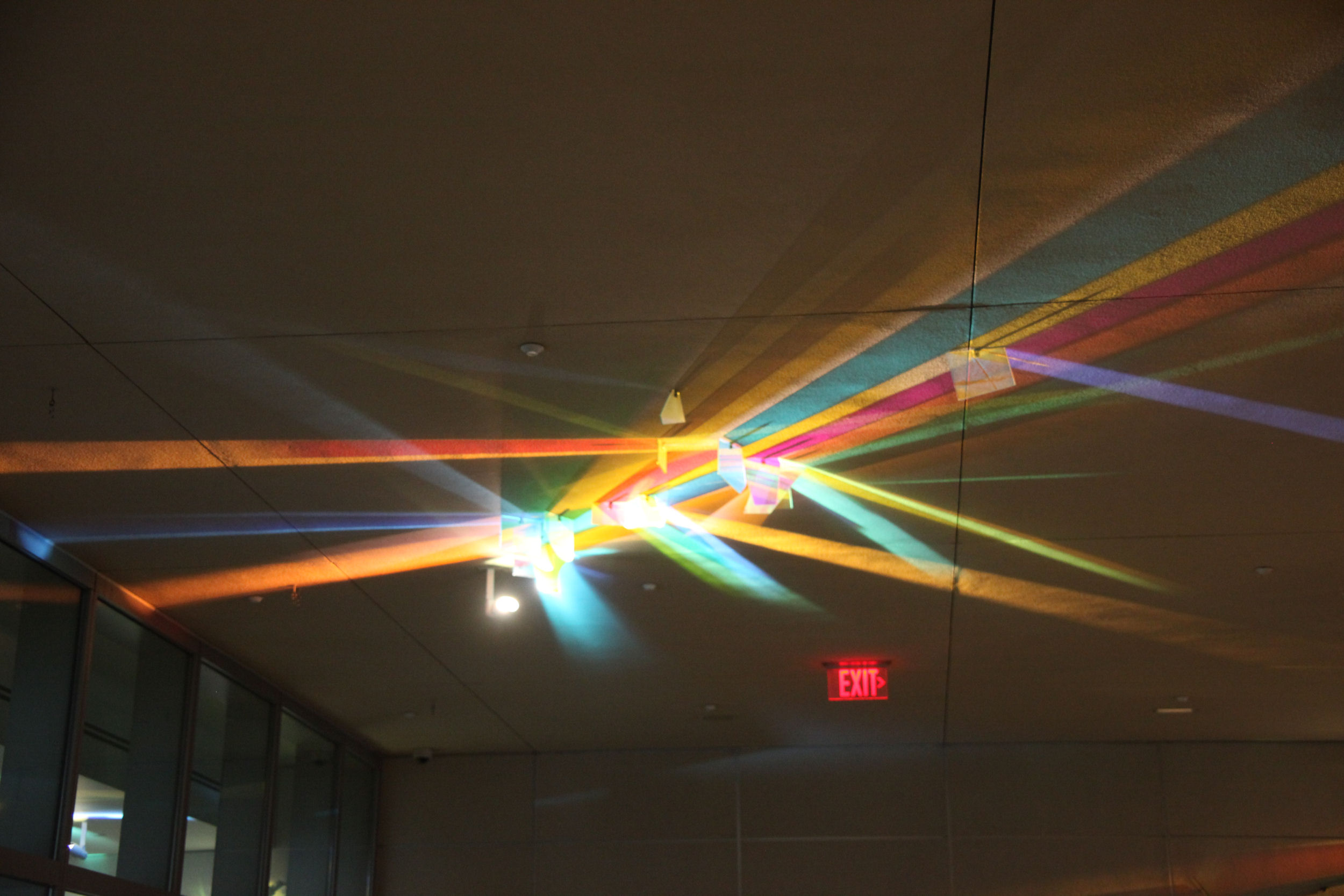
"Transformation", the light sculpture at Constitution Center

Some aesthetic improvements were made as well. The building now features a 1 acre (0.40 ha) park in its open-to-the-sky central courtyard. Most of the courtyard's concrete was removed, and trees, shrubs, and flowers were planted to absorb rainwater. The park, which is now no longer accessible by the public, also includes a huge granite abstract art sculpture ("Legacy") by Richard Deutsch. The sculpture is meant to reflect the original facade of the building by Edward Durrell Stone as well as the memory of David Nassif, Sr. and his son, David Nassif, Jr. The L'Enfant Plaza Metro station still has an entrance under the building on D Street SW (although this entrance closed between October 2007 and July 2008 for the building's reconstruction). The renovation installed artwork by internationally-known artist Stephen Knapp near this entrance, in which strong beams of light are passed through dyed glass to splay brightly colored patterns on the ceiling. The light sculpture, titled "Transformation", symbolizes the building's renovation and rebirth.

The Constitution Center is registered with the Green Building Council for Gold LEED Certification.

The renovated Constitution Center won two awards. The Mid-Atlantic Construction gave the building its "Project of the Year – Renovation/Restoration" accolade in December 2010. On March 25, 2011, the Washington Building Congress bestowed its 2011 WBC Craftsmanship Award on J.E. Richards, Inc. for excellence in workmanship in installing the power generation, distribution, and switchgear at Constitution Center.

In January 2011, Constitution Center was valued at $446 million by city tax assessors, making it the third most valuable private property in the city that year.

== Tenants ==
The late-2000s recession left the renovated building struggling to find tenants. It was empty for nearly two years after it was opened for occupancy in April 2009. Both the United States Department of Homeland Security and NASA explored leasing all or part of it in 2009 and 2010 but chose not to do so. In August 2010, the United States Securities and Exchange Commission (SEC) signed a letter contract for 900,000 square feet (84,000 m^{2}) of space at Constitution Center. The SEC planned to take occupancy in September 2011. In January 2011, the Office of the Comptroller of the Currency agreed to lease 640,000 square feet (59,000 m^{2}) of space, and the Federal Housing Finance Agency signed an agreement to occupy 335,000 square feet (31,100 m^{2}) of space. The Office of the Comptroller and the Federal Housing Finance Agency occupied the building by March 2012.

The SEC's occupancy of the building did not occur as planned. In October 2010, the SEC informed Nassif Associates that it needed only 340,000 square feet (32,000 m^{2}) of the 900,000 square feet (84,000 m^{2}) it had leased. On January 20, 2011, the SEC's inspector general launched an investigation into whether the SEC lease was proper and legal. SEC chairman Mary Schapiro was strongly criticized by Republicans in the United States House of Representatives for her handling of the lease, which she had personally approved. It was unclear if the SEC would occupy any space in the building by May. On May 23, the SEC inspector general requested a formal opinion by the Comptroller General of the United States as to whether the lease violated the Antideficiency Act. The inspector general said SEC "grossly overestimated the amount of space needed at SEC Headquarters for the SEC's projected expansion by more than 300 percent and used these groundless and unsupportable figures to justify the SEC committing to an expenditure of $556.8 million over 10 years".

In early July 2011, Nassif Associates said it had agreed to release the SEC from occupying 550,000 square feet (51,000 m^{2}) of space at Constitution Center. The company asked the SEC to reimburse it for $45 million in build-out and other expenses incurred between August 2010 and July 2011, but the agency declined to do so. Nassif Associates declined to file suit against the agency, although it indicated it would continue negotiating with the SEC and other federal agencies to seek reimbursement. At the same time, the United States Department of Justice said it was considering whether to prosecute officials at the SEC over the lease's handling and the alleged forging of documents designed to justify it.

Occupancy issues at the Constitution Center were further confused by legislative action. In October 2011, the United States House Committee on Transportation and Infrastructure voted 31-to-22 to permit the Federal Trade Commission to lease 160,000 square feet (15,000 m^{2}) of space at Constitution Center and vacate the Apex Building (which would be turned over to the National Gallery of Art). Although Congress did not adopt this legislation, the Transportation and Infrastructure Committee in March 2012 directed the General Services Administration (GSA) to analyze space needs for the Federal Trade Commission and several other federal agencies in the District of Columbia and issue a report to the committee on how Constitution Center could meet these needs. GSA reported in June 2012 that the Constitution Center held too little space to house the entire FTC, and it was too costly to do so (after accounting for moving expenses and rental prices). GSA instead proposed that the FTC lease additional space at 601 New Jersey Avenue NW and 1800 M Street NW (where it already leased space and where additional room was available).

In April 2012, Nassif Associates said the SEC also owed it rent. The company said the letter contract required the agency to pay $1.3 million a month beginning November 1, 2011. As of April 30, 2012, a company spokesperson said the agency owed $7.75 million in back rent. The agency disputed the cost, saying the build-out of the interior was never completed. SEC officials also said the agency now needed no space at Constitution Center and that the SEC was working with GSA to find other federal tenants to take over its lease. In late May, the Federal Aviation Administration said it might lease 270,000 square feet (25,000 m^{2}) of space in the building as part of a major consolidation of six of its offices in the city.

In July 2012, GSA bowed to congressional pressure and moved 1,100 FTC workers into Constitution Center from leased locations at 601 New Jersey Avenue NW and 1800 M Street NW. The deal kept the FTC in its Apex Building headquarters. Three months later, GSA rented out the last of its space in Constitution Center by signing leases for the National Endowment for the Arts and National Endowment for the Humanities.

== 2012 sale ==
On April 22, 2011, David Nassif Associates announced it was putting Constitution Center up for sale and said it hoped to find a buyer by the end of summer 2011. The company also hoped for a $900 million purchase price. Real estate banking firm Eastdil Secured assisted in securing a buyer.

In June 2012, the Washington Business Journal reported that CommonWealth Partners and Nassif Associates had negotiated a purchase agreement but could not reach an agreement. CommonWealth Partners then withdrew from any further discussions.

A deal for the sale of Constitution Center was agreed to in December 2012. MetLife and an unidentified investor (represented by Clarion Partners LLC) each purchased a 50 percent interest in the building. The sale price was $734 million, or $524 per square foot (0.093 square meters). The sale price was the most expensive in D.C. history for a single building. When the deal closed in February 2013, David Nassif Associates announced it would wind down its operations and liquidate its remaining obligations.

City tax assessors said that Constitution Center's value rose to $725.8 million in 2014, up from $573.5 million in 2013 (an increase of $152.3 million), making it the most valuable taxable property in the District of Columbia.

== Bibliography ==
- Banks, James G. and Banks, Peter S. The Unintended Consequences: Family and Community, the Victims of Isolated Poverty. Lanham, Md.: University Press of America, 2004.
- Committee on the District of Columbia. Subcommittee on Fiscal and Government Affairs. Amend Redevelopment Act of 1945 and Transfer U.S. Real Property to RLA: Hearings and Markups Before the Subcommittee on Fiscal and Government Affairs and the Committee on the District of Columbia. U.S. House of Representatives. 95th Congress, Second Session. Washington, D.C.: U.S. Government Printing Office, 1978.
- Gutheim, Frederick A. and Lee, Antoinette J. Worthy of the Nation: Washington, D.C., From L'Enfant to the National Capital Planning Commission. Baltimore, Md.: Johns Hopkins University Press, 2006.
- Historic American Buildings Survey. Southwest Washington, Urban Renewal Area. HABS DC-856. DC-856. National Park Service. U.S. Department of the Interior. July 2004.
- Rose, Mark H.; Seely, Bruce Edsall; and Barrett, Paul F. The Best Transportation System in the World: Railroads, Trucks, Airlines, and American Public Policy in the Twentieth Century. Columbus, Ohio: Ohio State University Press, 2006.
