= Omni Hotels & Resorts =

American international hotel company

- Type: Private
- Industry: Hospitality
- Founded: 1958
- Headquarters: Dallas, Texas, U.S.
- Key people: Kurt Alexander (president)
- Owner: Robert Rowling; TRT Holdings
- Website: www.omnihotels.com

Omni Hotels & Resorts is an American privately held, international hotel company based in Dallas, Texas. The company was founded in 1958 as Dunfey Hotels, and operates 51 properties in the United States and Canada, totaling over 20,010 rooms and employing more than 23,000 people.

== History ==
Dunfey Hotels was founded in 1958, when the Dunfey brothers added a 32-room motel to their Lamie's Tavern restaurant property in Hampton, New Hampshire. They soon established a hotel chain throughout New England, including 14 Sheraton Hotels franchises in 1964. In 1968, the Dunfeys acquired the near-bankrupt Parker House Hotel in Boston. In 1971, the brothers sold Dunfey Hotels to the Hartford-based Aetna Life Insurance Company, which retained the brothers to manage the properties. In 1976, Aer Lingus, the national airline of Ireland, purchased Dunfey Hotels from Aetna.

In 1983, Dunfey Hotels acquired the small Atlanta-based Omni International Hotels chain from Cousins Properties. The chain had been formed in 1973 and consisted of three hotels in Atlanta, Norfolk and Miami. Dunfey Hotels was reorganized into two operating divisions, with Omni Hotels focusing on large, upscale modern hotels, while the remaining smaller motels and Sheraton franchises were branded as Dunfey Hotels while they were divested over the following three years.

In 1988, Aer Lingus sold Omni Hotels to World International Holdings, Ltd., and the Hong Kong–based conglomerate The Wharf (Holdings) Limited for $135 million. Those companies, in turn, sold Omni in February 1996 to Texas-based private equity investor Robert Rowling of TRT Holdings, who moved the chain's headquarters from Hampton to his own base of Corpus Christi, Texas. The following year, Omni's headquarters moved again, this time to Dallas.

In 2000, Omni Hotels struck a deal with Turner Broadcasting to build a 600-room tower wing addition next to their existing hotel located in the CNN Center. The new wing opened in 2003. Omni bought Time Warner's share of the building in 2017.

In 2010, Omni Hotels purchased the Amelia Island Plantation in Florida for $67.1 million.

In January 2013, Omni Hotels acquired ClubCorp's Montelucia Resort & Spa. In June 2013, Omni Hotels acquired five properties (Barton Creek Resort & Spa in Austin, TX; La Costa Resort and Spa in Carlsbad, CA; Rancho Las Palmas Resort & Spa in Rancho Mirage, CA; The Grove Park Inn in Asheville, NC; The Homestead in Hot Springs, VA) from KSL Capital Partners. With this deal - worth $900 million according to The Wall Street Journal - Omni Hotels became an owner and operator of iconic American golf resorts. In July 2013, Omni Hotels assumed management and operations of the King Edward Hotel in Toronto, and bought shares of the property. In December 2015, Omni Hotels acquired the Omni Mount Washington Resort from CNL Financial Group, which it had operated under its brand since 2009.

In March 2018, Peter Strebel was named President of Omni Hotels & Resorts.

In December 2020, unions criticized Omni for using the Paycheck Protection Program to obtain a low-interest loan for business purposes, rather than using the money to pay workers (which would have turned the loan into a grant).

In March 2021, Omni sold five aging properties - Omni Dallas Hotel at Park West, Omni Houston Hotel at Westside, Omni San Antonio Hotel at the Colonnade, Omni Jacksonville Hotel and Omni Austin Hotel at Southpark.

In 2022, Kurt Alexander was appointed President of Omni Hotels & Resorts.

In 2025, a new Omni hotel opened in Ft. Lauderdale. The hotel chain has future plans to open properties in Mexico, Raleigh, NC and recently completed renovations on their Amelia Island property.

== Properties ==
All hotels managed and/or owned by Omni Corporate. The company had one franchised property, in Cancun, from 1988 to 2022.

=== United States ===
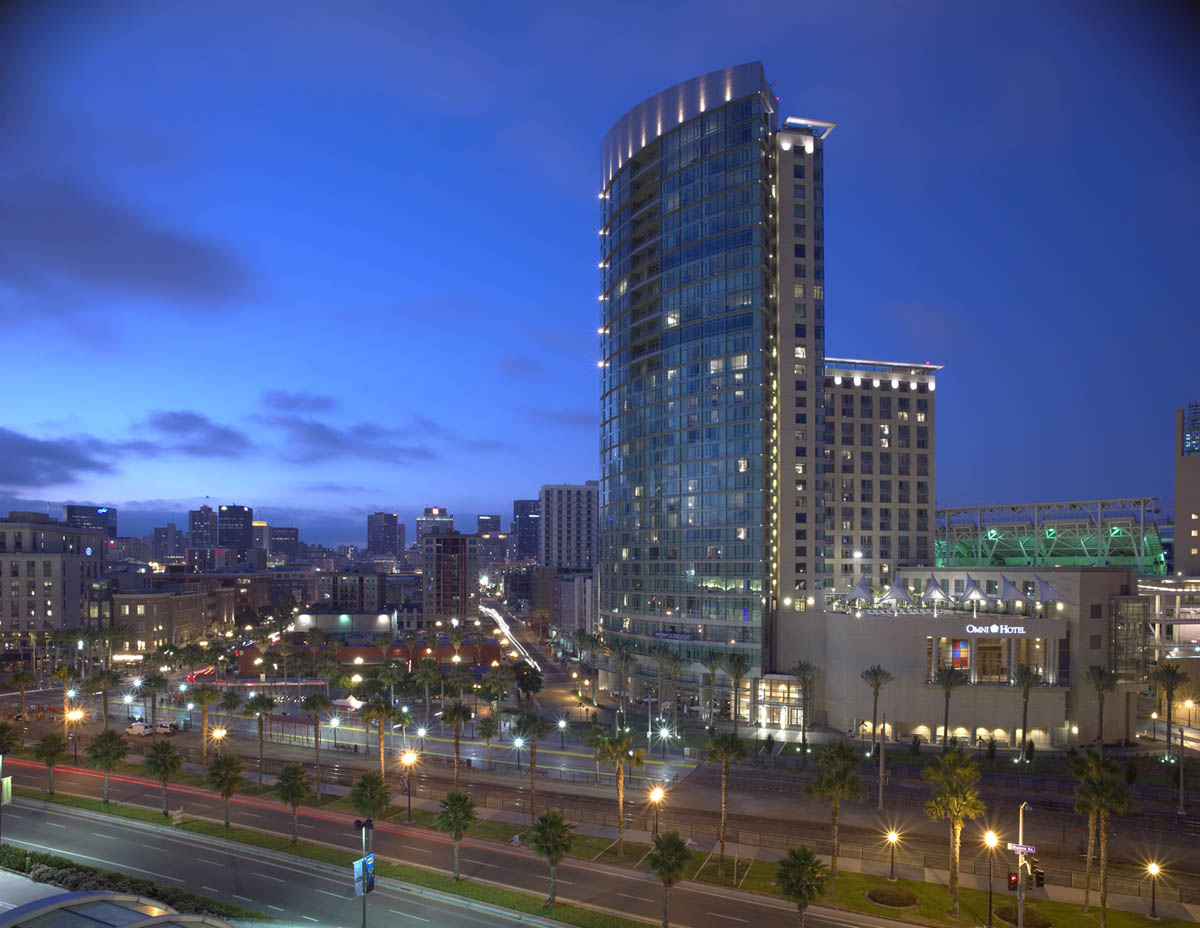
The four-star, 32-story Omni San Diego Hotel in San Diego, California

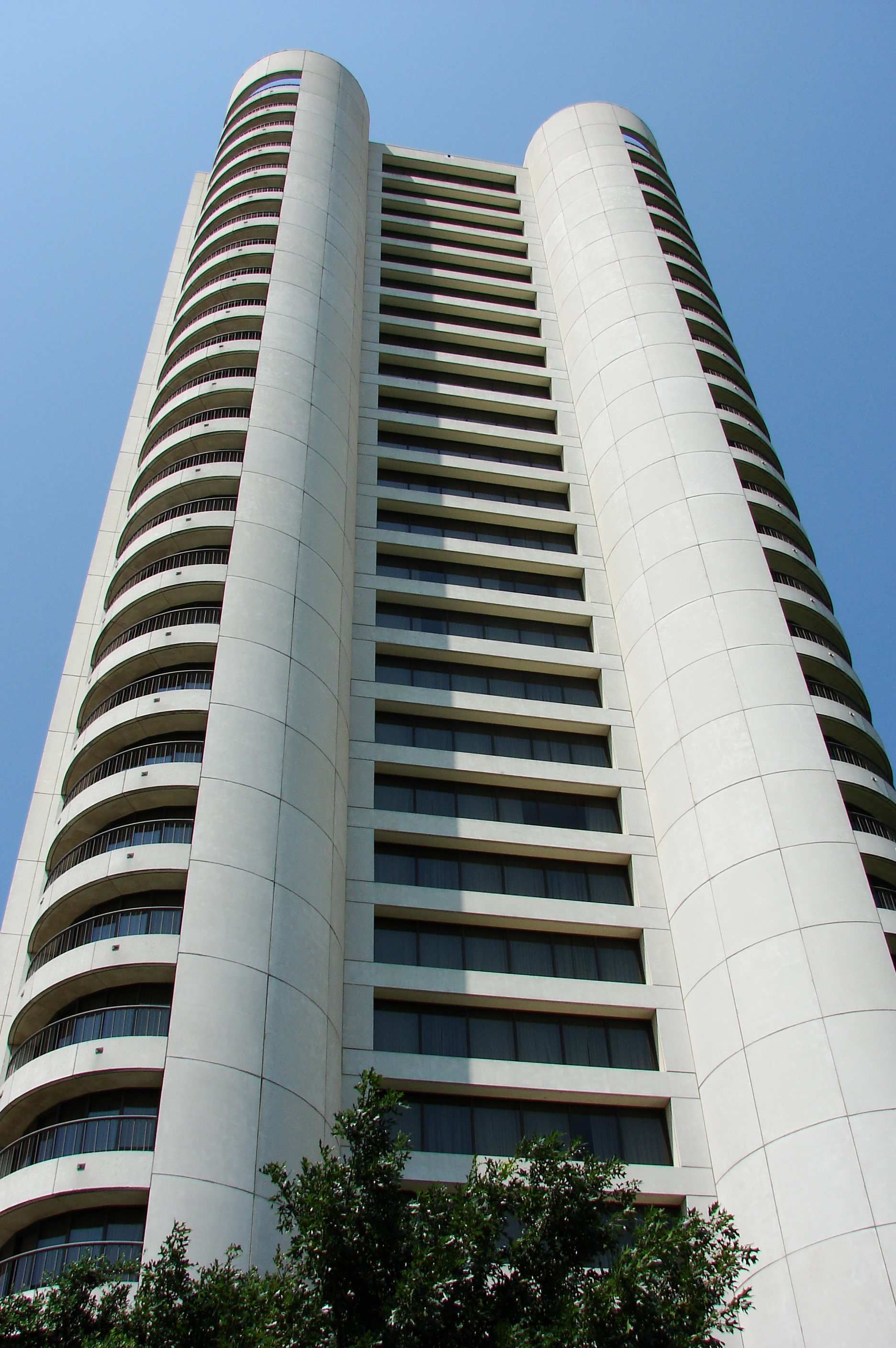
Omni Las Colinas Hotel in Las Colinas, Texas

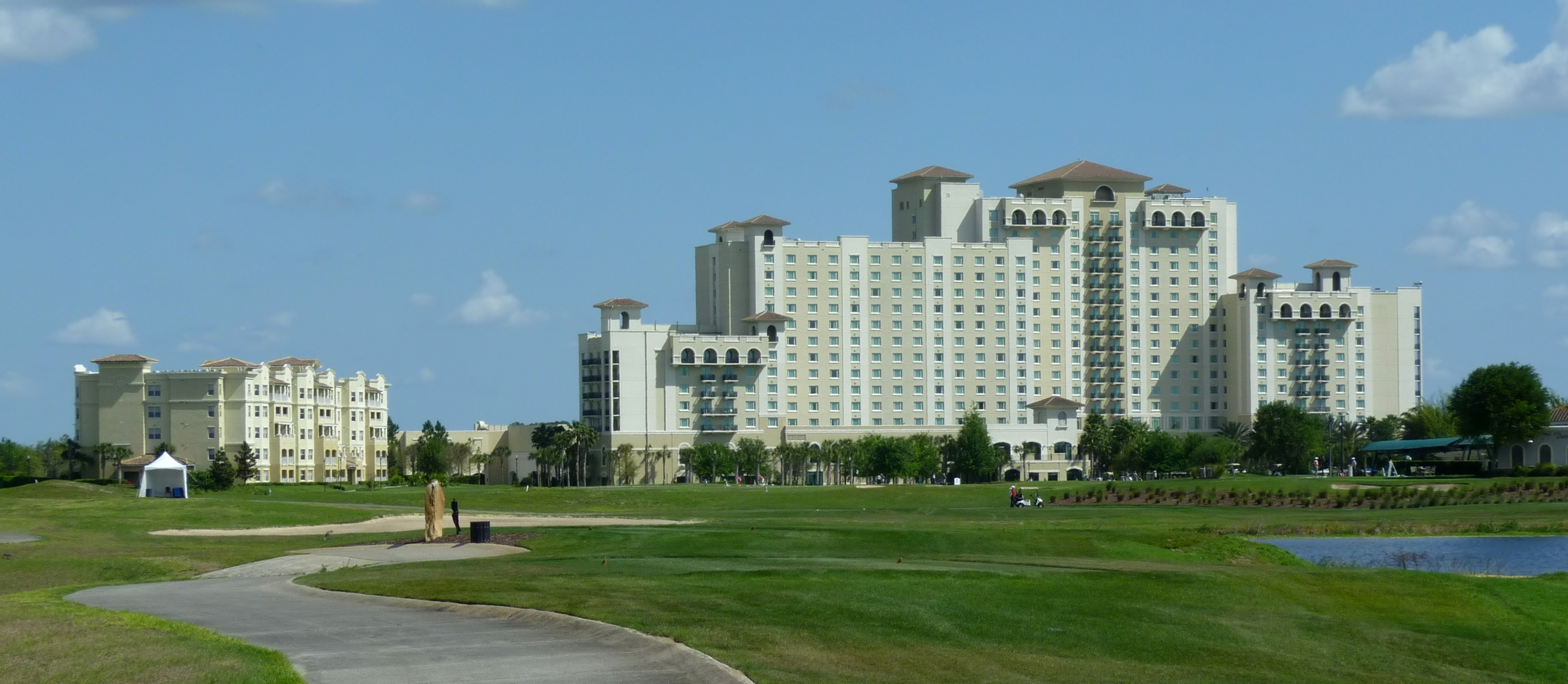
Omni Orlando Resort at ChampionsGates in Orlando, Florida

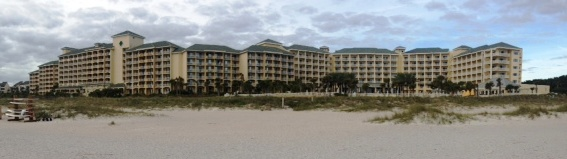
Omni Amelia Island Resort

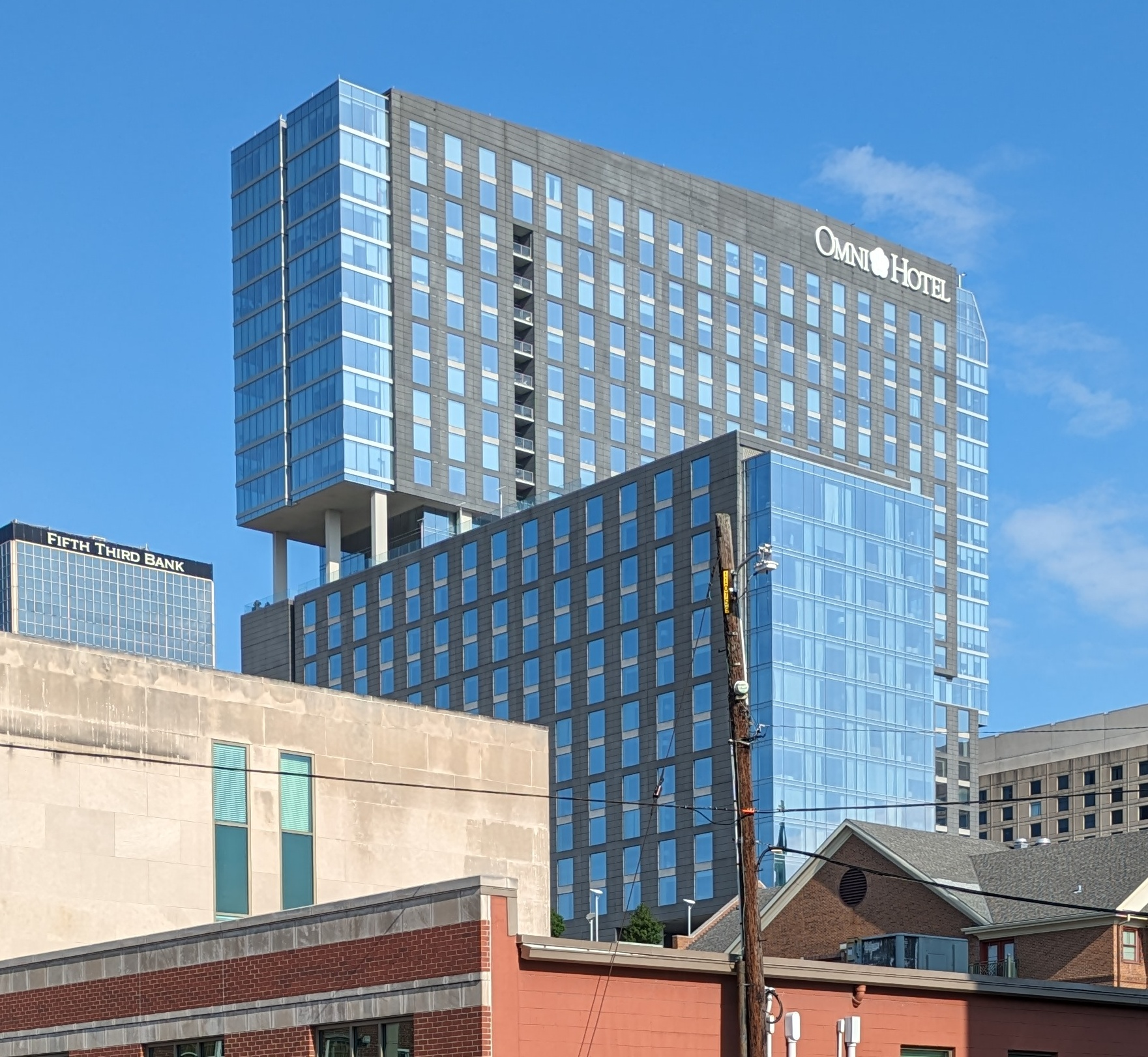
Omni Louisville Hotel in Louisville, Kentucky

| State | City | Name | Since |
|---|---|---|---|
| Arizona | Scottsdale | Omni Scottsdale Resort & Spa at Montelucia | 2014 |
| Arizona | Tempe | Omni Tempe Hotel at ASU | 2023 |
| Arizona | Tucson | Omni Tucson National Resort | 1996 |
| California | Carlsbad | Omni La Costa Resort & Spa | 2013 |
| California | Los Angeles | Omni Los Angeles Hotel at California Plaza | 2000 |
| California | Palm Springs | Omni Rancho Las Palmas Resort & Spa | 2013 |
| California | San Diego | Omni San Diego Hotel | 2004 |
| California | San Francisco | Omni San Francisco Hotel | 2002 |
| Colorado | Broomfield | Omni Interlocken Resort | 1999 |
| Connecticut | New Haven | Omni New Haven Hotel | 1998 |
| District of Columbia | Washington, D.C. | Omni Shoreham Hotel | 1979 |
| Florida | Fernandina Beach | Omni Amelia Island Resort | 2010 |
| Florida | Fernandina Beach | The Villas of Amelia Island | 2010 |
| Florida | Fort Lauderdale | Omni Fort Lauderdale | 2025 |
| Florida | Orlando | Omni Orlando Resort at ChampionsGate | 2004 |
| Georgia | Atlanta | Omni Atlanta Hotel at Centennial Park | 1975 |
| Georgia | Cumberland, Georgia | Omni Hotel at The Battery Atlanta | 2018 |
| Illinois | Chicago | Omni Chicago Hotel | 1993 |
| Indiana | Indianapolis | Omni Severin Hotel | 1989 |
| Kentucky | Louisville | Omni Louisville Hotel | 2018 |
| Louisiana | New Orleans | Omni Riverfront Hotel | 1996 |
| Louisiana | New Orleans | Omni Royal Orleans | 1981 |
| Massachusetts | Boston | Omni Parker House | 1968 |
| Massachusetts | Boston | Omni Boston Hotel at the Seaport | 2021 |
| Minnesota | Eagan | Omni Viking Lakes Hotel | 2020 |
| New Hampshire | Bretton Woods | Omni Bretton Arms at Mount Washington | 2009 |
| New Hampshire | Bretton Woods | Omni Mount Washington Resort | 2009 |
| New York | New York City | Omni Berkshire Place | 1977 |
| North Carolina | Asheville | The Omni Grove Park Inn | 2013 |
| North Carolina | Charlotte | Omni Charlotte Hotel | 1998 |
| North Carolina | Raleigh | Omni Raleigh Hotel | 2027 (Planned) |
| Oklahoma | Oklahoma City | Omni Oklahoma City Hotel | 2021 |
| Pennsylvania | Bedford | Omni Bedford Springs Resort | 2009 |
| Pennsylvania | Pittsburgh | Omni William Penn Hotel | 2001 |
| Rhode Island | Providence | Omni Providence Hotel | 2013 |
| South Carolina | Hilton Head | Omni Hilton Head Oceanfront Resort | 2012 |
| Tennessee | Nashville | Omni Nashville Hotel | 2013 |
| Texas | Austin | Omni Austin Hotel Downtown | 1992 |
| Texas | Austin | Omni Barton Creek Resort & Spa | 2013 |
| Texas | Corpus Christi | Omni Corpus Christi | 1996 |
| Texas | Dallas | Omni Dallas Hotel | 2011 |
| Texas | Dallas | Omni Las Colinas Hotel | 1992 |
| Texas | Fort Worth | Omni Fort Worth Hotel | 2009 |
| Texas | Frisco | Omni Frisco Hotel | 2017 |
| Texas | Frisco | Omni PGA Frisco Resort & Spa | 2023 |
| Texas | Houston | Omni Houston Hotel | 1991 |
| Texas | San Antonio | Omni La Mansion del Rio | 2006 |
| Texas | San Antonio | Mokara Hotel & Spa | 2010 |
| Virginia | Charlottesville | Omni Charlottesville Hotel | 1985 |
| Virginia | Hot Springs | The Omni Homestead Resort | 2013 |
| Virginia | Richmond | Omni Richmond Hotel | 1987 |

=== International ===
| Country | City | Name | Since |
|---|---|---|---|
| Canada | Montreal, Quebec | Hotel Omni Mont-Royal | 1999 |
| Canada | Toronto, Ontario | The Omni King Edward Hotel | 2013 |
| Mexico | Punta Mita, Nayarit | Omni Pontoque Resort | 2026 (Planned) |

== See also ==
- TRT Holdings
- Robert Rowling
- List of chained-brand hotels
