= Omni Berkshire Place =

Hotel in Manhattan, New York

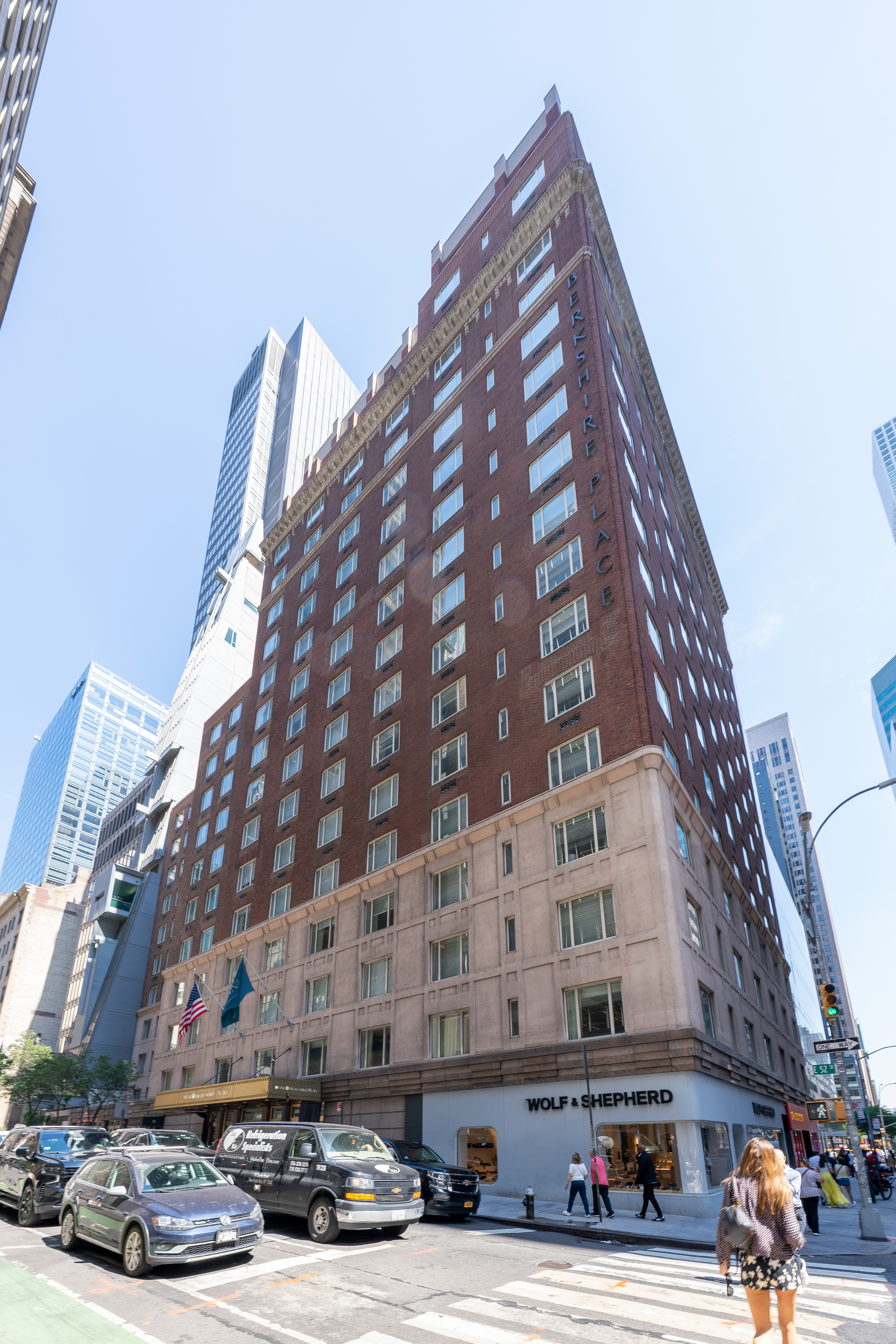
- (2026)

General information
- Location: Manhattan, New York City, 21 East 52nd St.
- Coordinates: 40°45′34″N 73°58′29″W
- Opening: 1926
- Owner: Omni Hotels
- Operator: Omni Hotels

Design and construction
- Architect: Warren & Wetmore

Other information
- Number of rooms: 395

The Omni Berkshire Place hotel is located at 21 East 52nd Street, near Madison Avenue, in Midtown Manhattan in New York City. It is owned and operated by Omni Hotels & Resorts. The hotel was also inducted into Historic Hotels of America, the official program of the National Trust for Historic Preservation, in 2010.

== History ==
=== Early history ===
Opened in 1926 as The Berkshire Hotel, it was designed by architects Warren & Wetmore in the Classical Revival style. It was built as a residential hotel and was part of the "Terminal City" project consisting of hotels and apartment buildings in the area around Grand Central Terminal. At the time of construction, it was 10 stories tall, located on a plot measuring 100 by 62 feet (30 by 19 m). Two years later, J.C. and M.G. Mayer leased the hotel for 21 years with plans to renovate it.

=== Connection to the arts ===
The Berkshire Hotel has historic ties to Broadway and the arts. Ethel Merman lived at the property for many years, and Rodgers and Hammerstein wrote the musical Oklahoma! in a suite that was later named the Rodgers and Hammerstein Suite. Alfred Hitchcock was also a regular.

The hotel was for many years the home of an exclusive private dining club founded by drama critic Alexander Woollcott and designed by Norman Bel Geddes. The club was known as the Elbow Room upon its opening in 1938. Its founding members included Harold Ross, George S. Kaufman, Robert E. Sherwood, Moss Hart, William S. Paley, Raymond Massey, and Cedric Hardwicke. Later renamed the Barberry Room, it was known as "the most exclusive restaurant in New York". Rodgers and Hammerstein collaborated at a reserved table, Edward R. Murrow dined there each Friday before the airing of his Person to Person show, and Frank Sinatra dined there in 1955 with heiress Gloria Vanderbilt. Marc Connelly, David Sarnoff, and Richard Rodgers continued to be regulars into the 1950s.

Salvador Dalí dined at the Barberry in 1960 and took offense at a William-Adolphe Bouguereau painting in the dining room depicting a satyr surrounded by nymphs. Dalí reportedly considered Bouguereau's nymphs to be bad art and struck a deal with the hotel to trade his own painting of nymphs for the Bouguereau. Dalí returned to the dining room days later and, as well-heeled diners watched and dodged paint, created an abstract impression of nymphs. He used a rubber cap on his head to apply the paint to a seven-foot canvas. The Barberry Room displayed Dalí's nymphs for a time, but it was later relegated to a linen closet. In 1979, the New York Daily News reported that the Dalí had disappeared.

=== Subsequent sales and renovations ===
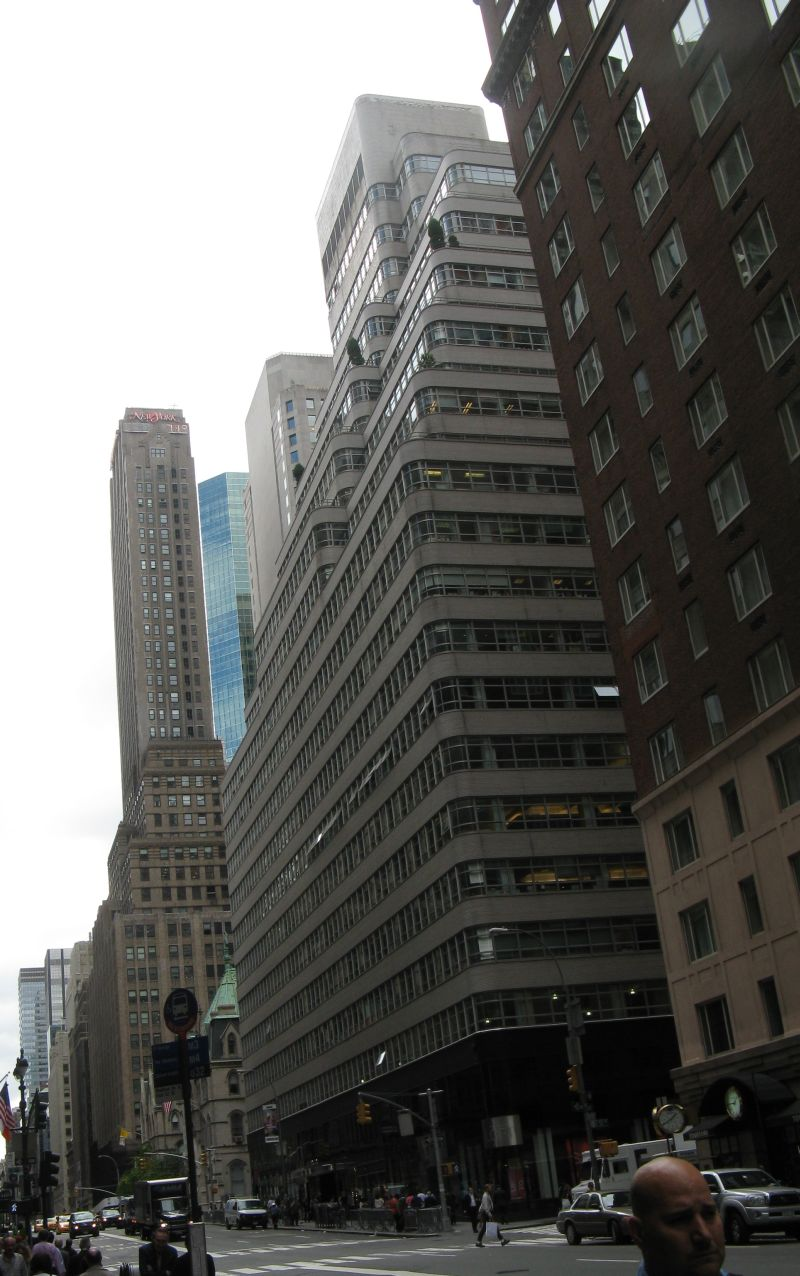
Omni Berkshire Place is at far right, across from the Look building at center.

The Berkshire Hotel was purchased in 1959 by the Knott Hotels Corporation. Knott subsequently built a 15-story, 158-room addition.

In 1977, the hotel was acquired by Dunfey Hotels, a subsidiary of Aer Lingus, for $9.7 million, becoming the first hotel in New York City to be run by that chain. The new owners evicted Ethel Merman in 1978, stating they did not want permanent residents. Dunfey renovated the hotel at a cost of $9 million to designs by Peter Gisolfi Associates and interior architect Roland Jutras. The project involved renovating all of the guest rooms. The refurbished hotel reopened in June 1979 as Berkshire Place - A Dunfey Classic Hotel. That year, The New York Times called the structure "a handsome unexceptional building erected in 1926 to the designs of Warren & Wetmore, one of New York's finest architectural firms of the eclectic period". Its restoration was described by media as part of a "building boom" that followed the city's near-bankruptcy in 1975, as well as part of a general trend of foreign airlines renovating hotels in New York City.

Dunfey Hotels acquired the Omni Hotels chain in 1983 and the hotel was soon after renamed Omni Berkshire Place. Omni bought the Berkshire Place hotel outright in March 1992 for $83.5 million. The hotel was further renovated in 1995 and 2003. During the 1995 renovation, which cost $50 million, the Omni Berkshire Place was downsized from 415 to 395 rooms, and numerous amenities were added to each room. After the renovation, the average guest room was 375 square feet (34.8 m^{2}) and there were 20 handicapped-accessible guest rooms.

In early 2020, due to the COVID-19 pandemic in New York City, Omni closed the hotel indefinitely and fired 268 staff members. On June 11, 2020, Omni announced that the Omni Berkshire Place would close permanently, though TRT Holdings, owner of Omni Hotels, would retain the property for possible conversion to an office building. In October 2021, the owners reversed their plans and reopened the hotel. This followed a piece of legislation passed by the New York City Council in September 2021; the legislation required hotels that closed due to the pandemic to pay severance to their employees if they did not reopen with at least 25 percent of their pre-pandemic staff. Omni Hotels president Peter Strebel said: "Paying the severance would have cost more than reopening."
