= Omni San Diego Hotel =

Hotel in San Diego, California

Coordinates: 32°42′24″N 117°09′31″W

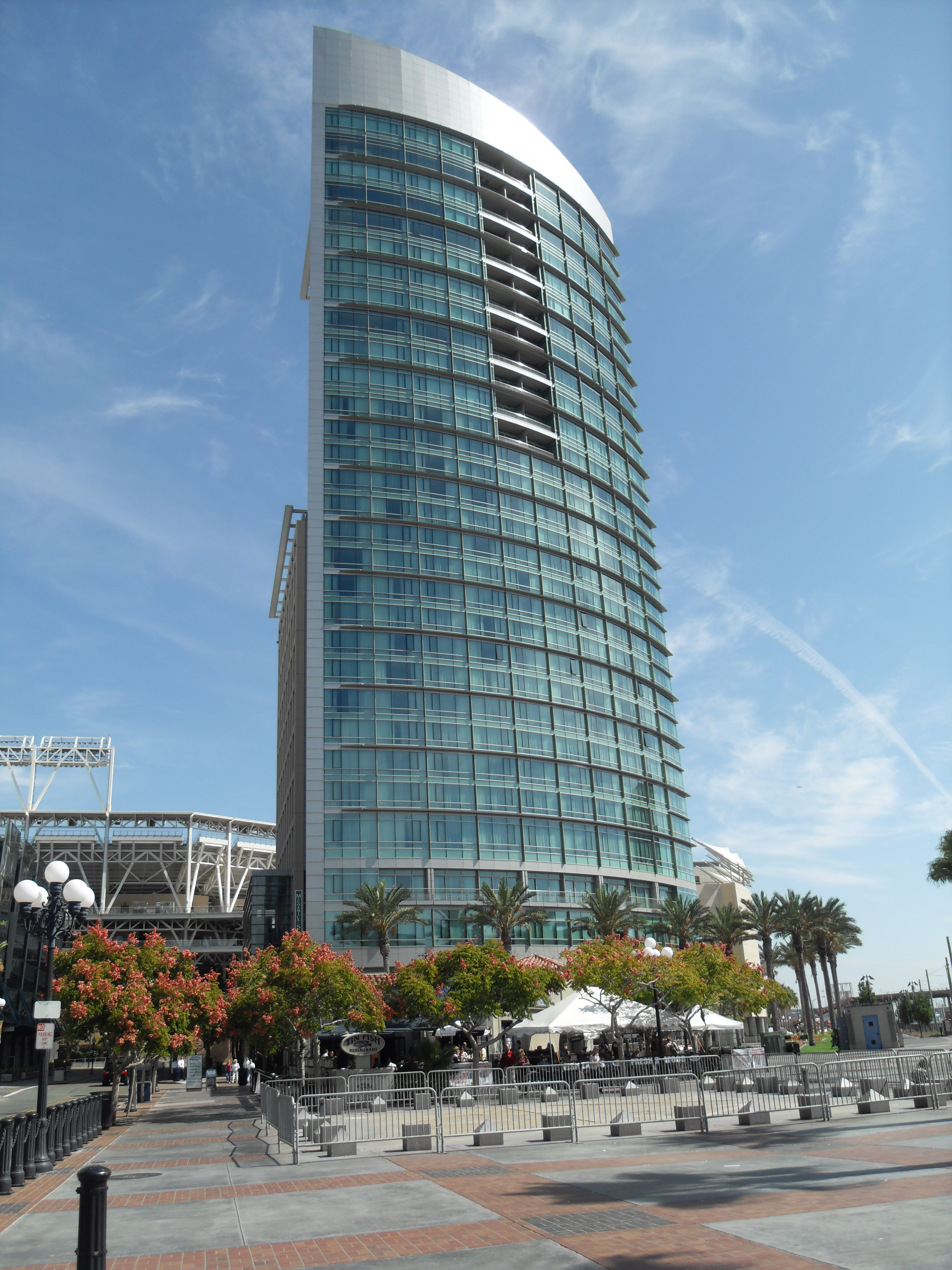
- Interactive map of the Omni San Diego Hotel area

General information
- Location: 675 L Street; San Diego, California 92101; United States
- Completed: 2004
- Cost: $124 million
- Owner: Omni Hotels & Resorts

Height
- Height: 385 ft (117 m)

Technical details
- Floor count: 32
- Floor area: 600,728 sq ft (55,809.5 m^{2})

Design and construction
- Structural engineer: Magnusson Klemencic Associates
- Other designers: Jeffrey Beers International

Other information
- Number of units: 511

Omni San Diego Hotel is a four-diamond high-rise luxury hotel and condominium tower in San Diego, California. It is owned and operated by Omni Hotels & Resorts.

== Hotel ==
Built in 2004 at a cost of $124 million, the 32-story, 511-room Omni San Diego is located across the street from the San Diego Convention Center and connected via sky bridge to Petco Park. The tower was developed by JMI Realty and designed by architectural firm Hornberger and Worstell. Other key contributors include general contractor Swinerton and Architectural Glass and Aluminum as the glazing contractor. The hotel has over 20,000 square feet (1,900 m^{2}) of meeting space in addition to a 9,750-square-foot (906 m^{2}) ballroom. There is also a sixth-floor outdoor terrace with a heated pool and jacuzzi, a McCormick & Schmick's seafood restaurant, and a full-service business center. The hotel's interior was renovated in 2024 by Jeffrey Beers International.

== The Metropolitan ==
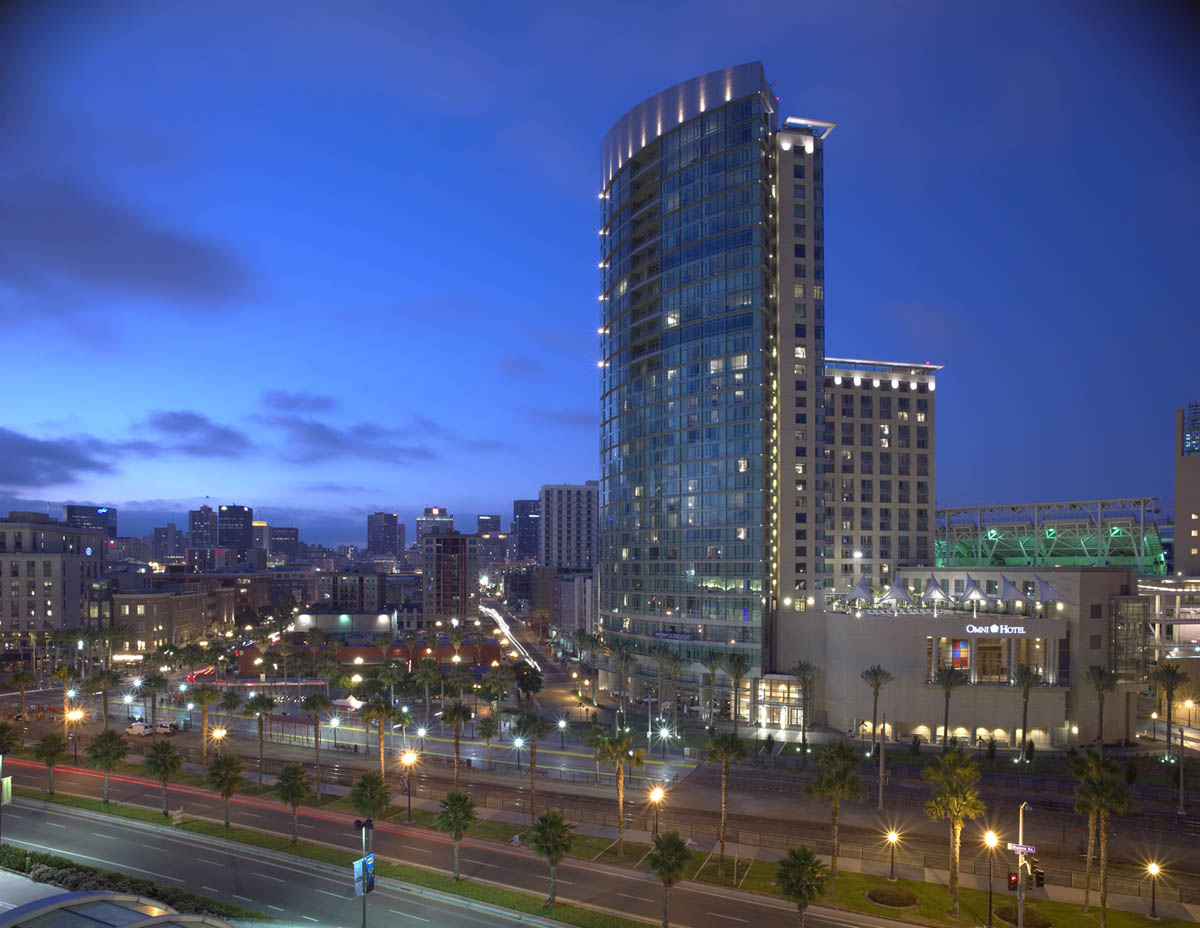
Omni San Diego Hotel at night

Occupying the top 11 floors of the Omni hotel tower (floors 22-32), the Metropolitan is a collection of 37 multimillion-dollar penthouse condominiums.

== See also ==
- List of tallest buildings in San Diego
