= Foundry Square =

Four linked buildings in San Francisco, US

- Location within San Francisco Location within California Location within the United States

General information
- Type: mixed-use
- Location: 400-500 Howard Street, San Francisco, California
- Coordinates: 37.78854°N 122.39602°W

Technical details
- Size: 1,200,000 square feet (110,000 m^{2})
- Floor count: 10

Design and construction
- Architecture firm: STUDIOS Architecture, Jim Jennings Architecture, Page & Turnbull, Webcor Builders, and landscape architect SWA Group
- Developer: Wilson Equity Office (now Wilson Meany)

Foundry Square is a complex of four architecturally-linked, 10-story mid-rise buildings located at Howard and First Streets near the Salesforce Transit Center in the South of Market neighborhood of San Francisco, California. Each of the four buildings stands on a different corner of the street.

Each building is a mixed-use structure. The four structures combined provide a total interior area of 1,200,000 square feet (110,000 m^{2}). The design team included STUDIOS Architecture, Jim Jennings Architecture, Page & Turnbull, Webcor Builders, and landscape architect SWA Group. The developer was Wilson Equity Office (now Wilson Meany). The Glazing Contractor used on these buildings was AGA (Architectural Glass and Aluminum). Current tenants include the law firm of Orrick, Herrington & Sutcliffe, STUDIOS Architecture, the headquarters of Slack, and the NASDAQ Entrepreneurial Center.

The project's first phase, Foundry Square II (405 Howard Street) and Foundry Square IV (500 Howard Street), was completed in 2003. The third building, Foundry Square I (400 Howard Street), was completed in 2007. In April 2012, Tishman Speyer acquired the entitlements to the final building, Foundry Square III (505 Howard Street), from Wilson Meany Sullivan, and broke ground later that year. Foundry Square III was completed in April 2014.

The 1,000 square feet (93 m^{2}) contained within Foundry Square's four open corners form a larger, unified public square. Each building's 200-foot (61 m) dual-glaze glass walls frame the square, establishing an arcade that defines the transition between interior building space and public exterior spaces. The four corners of the intersection are integrated by the use of public art and sculpture (such as Richard Deutsch's "Time Signature" stainless steel sculpture), tree bosques, ground-floor cafes, and over-scaled pots. The project earned SWA Group the ASLA Northern California Chapter Merit Award in 2006.

As of May 2023, during what the San Francisco Chronicle described as "Downtown San Francisco['s] worst office vacancy crisis on record," Foundry Square IV (500 Howard Street) had a vacancy rate of 95.4% and Foundry Square III (505 Howard Street) had a vacancy rate of 97.6%, compared to 1.6% for Foundry Square II (405 Howard Street) and 36.9% for Foundry Square I (400 Howard Street).
