= TRT Holdings =

Private holding company in Dallas, Texas, USA

TRT Holdings, Inc.
- Type: Private
- Industry: Hospitality; investment
- Founded: 1989
- Founder: Robert B. Rowling
- Headquarters: Irving, Texas, United States
- Key people: Robert B. Rowling (Chairman and CEO); Blake Rowling (President)
- Products: Investments
- Services: Hospitality; real estate; oil and gas investments
- Subsidiaries: Omni Hotels & Resorts; Gold's Gym
- Website: www.trtholdings.com

TRT Holdings is a private holding company based in Dallas, Texas, that owns hotel chain Omni Hotels & Resorts, Origins Behavioral Healthcare, and many investments in other companies. It was founded in 1989.

== Management ==
Robert Rowling co-founded the company, and as of 2010 served as owner, chief executive officer, and president.

== History ==
TRT Holdings was founded in 1989 by Texas oil entrepreneurs Reese Rowling and his son, Robert Rowling. They had made a fortune in the oil industry through Tana Exploration Company. The company has made several acquisitions over the years, including the Omni Hotel chain in 1996, Gold's Gym International in 2004, and Cresta Construction in Irving, Texas.

During the 2010 election cycle, TRT Holdings donated $2.5 million from the company treasury to American Crossroads, a conservative political action committee.

In August 2020, TRT Holdings sold Gold's Gym to German fitness company RSG Group for US$100 million.

In 2021, TRT holdings donated $50,000 to Save Austin Now, a political action committee.
