= Parker House roll =

Type of bread roll

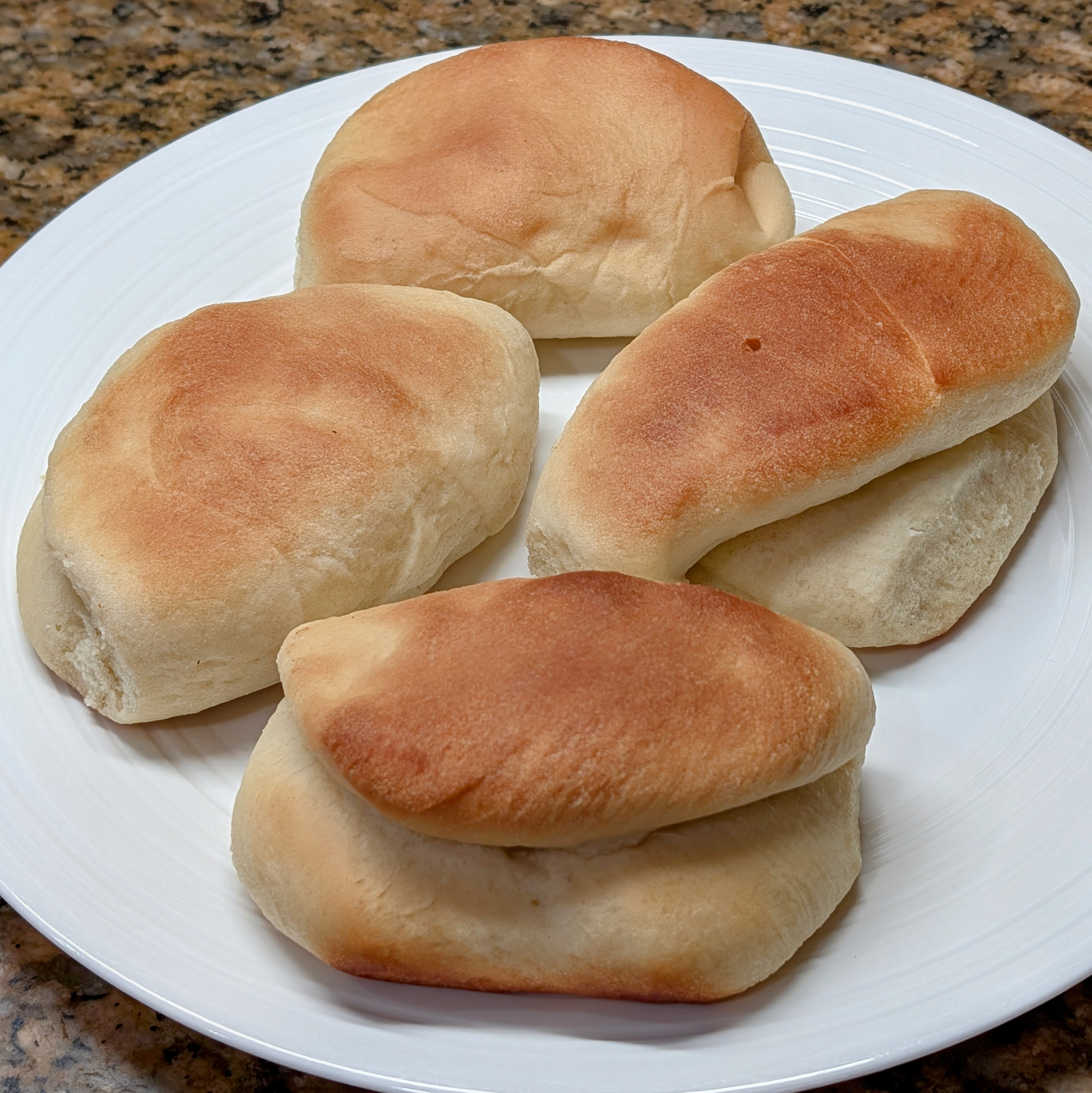
- Type: Bread roll
- Place of origin: United States
- Associated cuisine: New England
- Created by: Parker House Hotel
- Main ingredients: Flour, milk, butter or margarine, eggs, sugar

A Parker House roll is a bread roll made by flattening the center of a ball of dough with a rolling pin so that it becomes an oval shape, and then folding the oval in half. They are made with milk and are generally quite buttery, soft, and slightly sweet with a crispy shell.

They were invented at the Parker House Hotel in Boston, during the 1870s. The story of their creation has several variations, but they all involve an angry pastry cook throwing unfinished rolls into the oven, which results in their dented appearance. The recipe for Parker House rolls first started appearing in cookbooks in the 1880s. Fannie Farmer gives a recipe for them in her 1896 The Boston Cooking-School Cook Book.

== See also ==
- List of regional dishes of the United States
