= Richard Deutsch =

American sculptor (born 1953)

- Born: 1953 (age 72–73); Los Angeles, California, US
- Education: University of California, Santa Cruz
- Known for: Sculpture
- Movement: Minimalism, Expressionism

Richard Deutsch (born 1953) is an American sculptor who works primarily in the Minimalist and Expressionist genres. Although his work ranges from small table-top pieces to multi-story sculptures, Deutsch "is well-known for his large-scale architectural and environmental projects."

== Life and career ==
Deutsch was born in Los Angeles, California, in 1953. His grandparents emigrated to the United States from Russia in the first decade of the 20th century. His mother worked for the board of directors of the American Civil Liberties Union.

Deutsch received a Bachelor of Fine Arts from the University of California, Santa Cruz in 1976. He originally worked only in ceramics, and was influenced by Bizen ware (a type of very hard, reddish Japanese ceramic sculpture and pottery). The first solo exhibition of his work occurred in Seattle, Washington, in 1978. In 1981, his work was part of the "American Porcelain" exhibit at the Renwick Gallery at the Smithsonian Institution. (His contribution, "Equinox," is now part of the museum's permanent collection.) After several years of exhibiting on the West Coast and making larger and larger sculptures, Deutsch decided in the mid-1980s to work in other materials (such as bronze, concrete, granite, plaster, stainless steel, and terrazzo) and begin creating much larger artworks designed for public spaces.

In 2000, Deutsch collaborated with choreographer Liss Fain on her dance piece "Quarry." Real-time images of Deutsch at work on a sculpture ("Seven Stones," a 20 by 36 feet (6.1 by 11.0 m) granite piece) were transmitted via the Internet and projects onto a scrim and four background panels while six dancers improvised movement (which was intended to make them appear to be interacting with the Deutsch). Technical difficulties marred the performance.

Deutsch lives in Davenport, California.

== Design philosophy ==
Deutsch has described his more recent work as an attempt to create an "artist-driven environment" in which the audience interacts with his art by seeing it, touching it, being able to stop and contemplate it, and move through it. His public art is highly contextual, and he researches the history and setting of a site before beginning his work. His sculpture is also often collaborative, as he works with architects, engineers, and landscape architects to ensure that his art fits with the site.

Deutsch works at a number of studio/workshops in China, Italy, and the United States, and utilizes material from around the world.

== Noted works ==
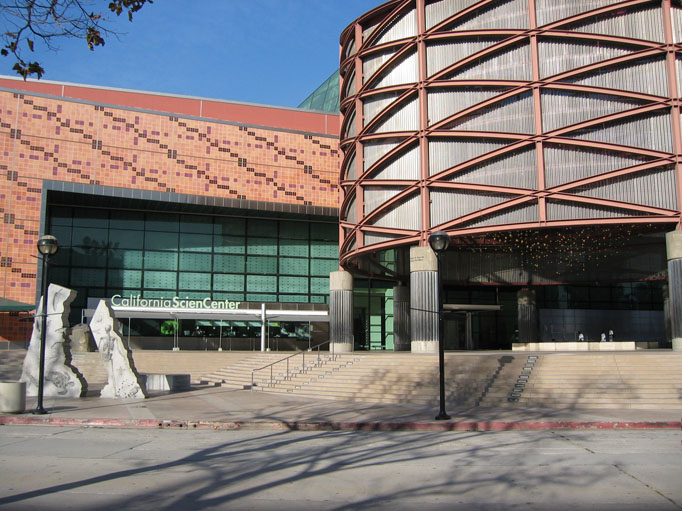
"Water Story," Deutsch's metaphorical sculpture about water's journey from the mountains to the sea, in front of the California Science Center.

The more notable of Deutsch's works include:

- "Voyage," a wall-like sculpture created from massive ship propellers, installed at the City Center in Oakland, California.
- "Unity," a piece composed of several standing granite forms, also a City Center in Oakland, California.
- "Against the Day," a rock sculpture at The Collection at Chevy Chase, a two-building luxury retail shopping center and 9,000 square feet (840 m^{2}) park in Chevy Chase, Maryland.
- "Axis," a sculpture of circular granite pieces set in a wooden groove at the entrance to the School of Engineering at Stanford University.
- "Etude," a piece at the entrance to the headquarters of Applied Materials in Santa Clara, California.
- A 70-short-ton (64 t) granite "garden" of standing stones in a memorial garden at Congregation Shir Hadash in San Jose, California.
- "Hulls," two tall, lightweight, stone-like pieces which resemble sailboat sails in front of 500 Terry Francois in the Mission Bay neighborhood of San Francisco, California. The piece was originally intended for the intersection of Main Street and Tiburon Boulevard in Tiburon, California, was never installed.
- "Legacy," a large granite sculpture in the courtyard of the Constitution Center office building in Washington, D.C.
- "Time Signature," a series of five stainless steel stacked circular forms in front of the Foundry Square office building complex in San Francisco.
- "Stacked Column," a black basalt structure (similar to interlocking Lincoln Logs) in the lobby of the Regent Bal Harbour hotel in Bal Harbour, Florida.
- "Water Story," a 5 feet (1.5 m) high black granite "mountain" over which water flows along "riverbeds" to an "ocean" (pool) below, located in front of the California Science Center.
- "Harvest," consisting of bronze casts of farm implements welded together into a tower, which stands before the Oakland Museum of California.

== Awards and honors ==
Deutsch was a Visiting Artist in 1987 at the American Academy in Rome, and received a grant in 1984 from the National Endowment for the Arts. In 2007, Santa Cruz County, California, named him County Artist of the Year.
