= Reese Rowling =

- Born: Reese McIntosh Rowling; 1928; Waycross, Georgia, U.S.
- Died: 2001 (aged 72–73)
- Education: Texas College of Mines and Metallurgy
- Occupations: businessman and geologist
- Known for: co-founded Tana Oil and Gas Corporation with William E. Colson
- Children: Robert Rowling
- Parent(s): Harry Herschel Rowling; Lily Mae Rowling

Reese McIntosh Rowling (1928–2001) was an American businessman and geologist, who co-founded Tana Oil and Gas Corporation with William E Colson in Corpus Christi, Texas, which was eventually taken over by Texaco.

He was born in 1928 in Waycross, Georgia, the son of Harry Herschel Rowling, a railway worker, and his wife Lily Mae Rowling. In 1951 he graduated from the Texas College of Mines and Metallurgy (now UTEP).

In 1972, he co-founded Tana Oil and Gas Corporation with William E. Colson in Corpus Christi, Texas

He was the father of Robert Rowling.
