= Architectural Glass and Aluminum =

American glass and aluminum company

- Founded: 1970
- Headquarters: Livermore, California
- Website: www.aga-ca.com

Architectural Glass and Aluminum (AGA) is a specialty glazing contractor located in the United States. Architectural Glass & Aluminum provides engineering, design, fabrication, installation, and assembly services for custom glazing systems, such as Curtain Wall, Storefront, Punched Openings, and Window Wall. The firm works with architects and General Contractors to meet desired aesthetics, and performance criteria (such as LEED), while providing details that interface with other exterior enclosure substrates. Along with glazing of glass, AGA installs systems with infills including aluminum panels, composite materials, and natural stone. The company has also dealt with integrating custom ornamental trims and sunscreens on a number of projects.

AGA is headquartered in Livermore, California.

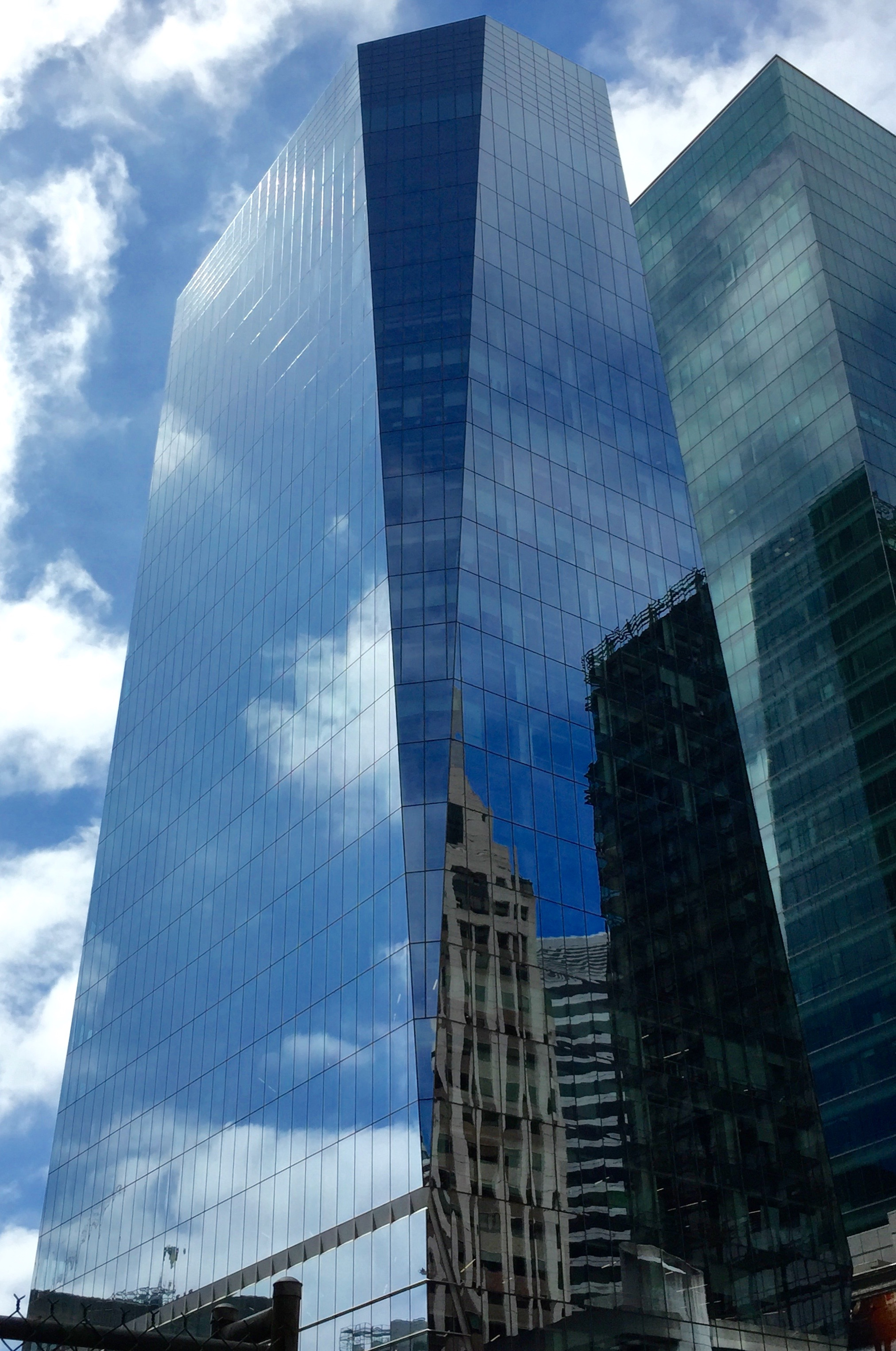
The 535 Mission Street Project in San Francisco features a 4 sided SSG curtain wall installed and designed by Architectural Glass and Aluminum.

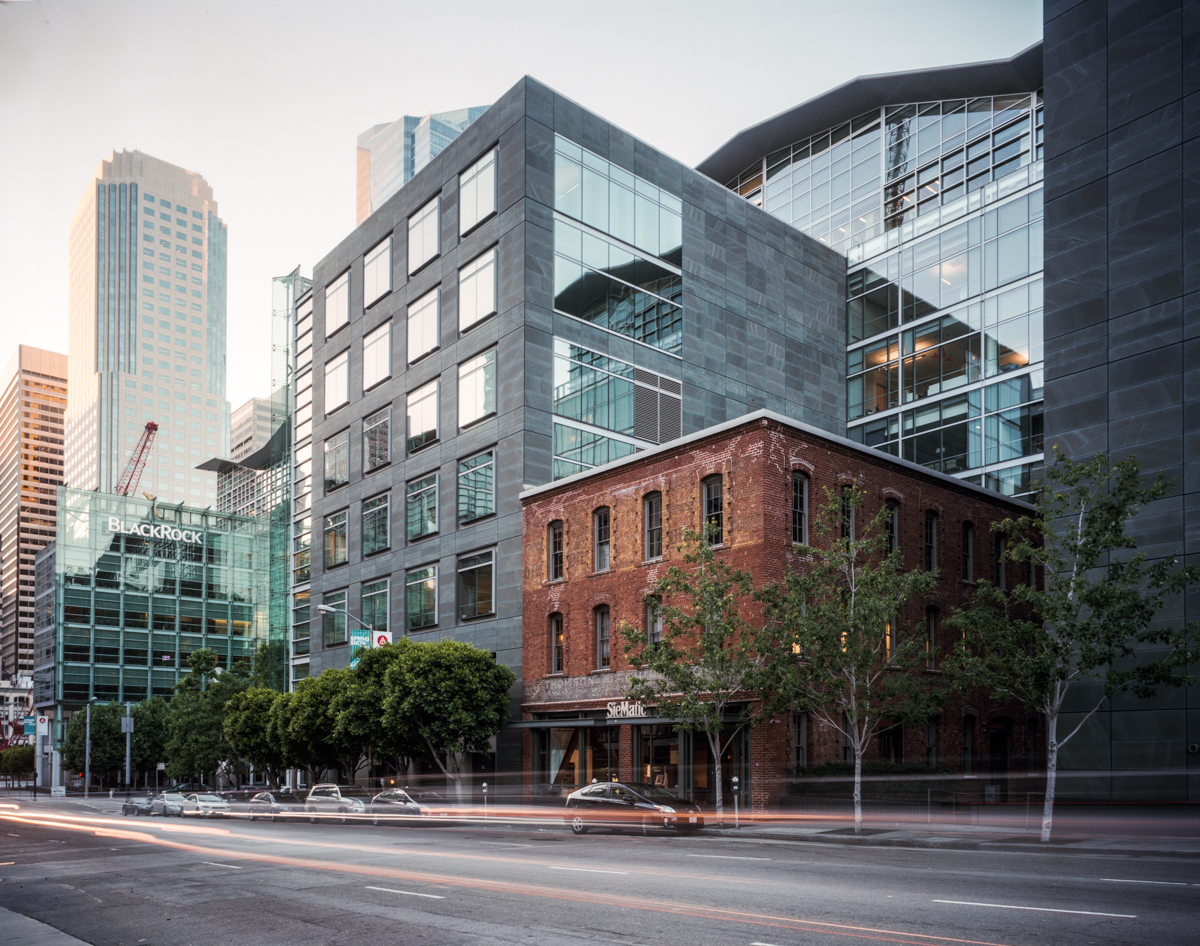
The Foundry II building facade by Architectural Glass and Aluminum, incorporates historic industrial building styles with modern design.

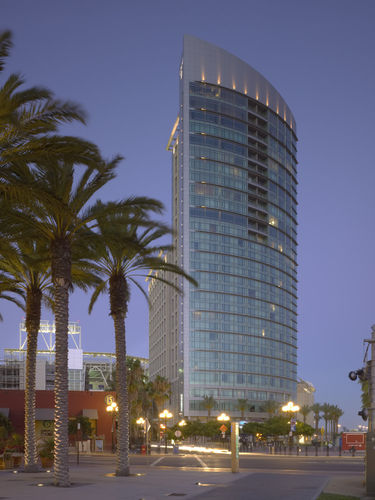
The Omni San Diego Hotel curtain wall constructed by Architectural Glass and Aluminum is an example of a modern unitized curtain wall system with integrated sunshades.

== History ==
Architectural Glass and Aluminum (AGA) was founded in 1970 by 5 employees and established in the San Francisco Bay Area. Recently AGA has taken the structure of a 100% employee-owned company (ESOP). Following years of executing contract and service work, AGA has now expanded to become a major Pacific Rim company, with full service offices in Livermore, Temecula, and Sacramento. AGA continues to grow, having now completed projects in the states of California, Hawaii, Washington, Alaska and Texas. In 2014 AGA ranked 28th for ENR California's Top Specialty Contractors.

== Office locations ==
Livermore, California – Headquarters, Northern California Branch

Irvine, California – Southern California Branch

Honolulu, Hawaii – Pacific Branch

== Notable projects ==
Omni San Diego Hotel, CA 2004

St. Regis Museum Tower, CA 2005

InterContinental San Francisco (888 Howard), CA 2007

Valley Health Center, CA 2007

CalSTRS, CA 2009

Sacramento International Airport Landside, CA 2011

David and Lucile Packard Foundation Headquarters Los Altos, CA 2012–13

Exploratorium, CA 2013

Foundry Square, CA 2003–14

100 Van Ness Avenue, CA 2015

535 Mission Street, CA 2015
