= Harvey D. Parker =

American hotelier

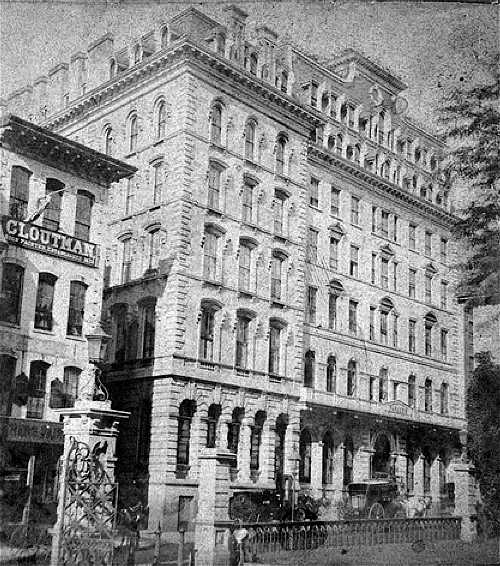
Parker House, School Street, Boston, 19th century

Harvey D. Parker (1805–1884), also known as H.D. Parker, was an hotelier in Boston, Massachusetts. He built the Parker House, the first hotel in the United States "on the European Plan".

== Biography ==
Parker was born in Temple, Maine, and spent much of his youth in Paris, Maine. In 1825, at age 20, he moved to Boston. He began working at Hunt's restaurant, Court Square, in 1832. A few months later he bought out the owner, and in 1833 opened Parker's Restaurant in the basement of 4 Court Square. He married in 1839. With John F. Mills he established the firm of Parker & Mills in 1845. The partnership lasted until Mills' death in 1876.

=== Parker House ===
In 1854, he built the Parker House hotel and restaurant, "an immense establishment of marble", designed by architect William Washburn. Located on School Street in Boston, it occupied the former site of the Boston Latin School, and later the house of Jacob Wendell, great-grandfather of Oliver Wendell Holmes Sr. The hotel opened in 1855 and expanded in 1858.

Around 1880, with Joseph H. Beckman and Edward O. Punchard, Parker established the firm Harvey D. Parker & Co. His partners took over the business after Parker's death in 1884. On November 16, 1882, a large public dinner was held in honor of Parker's 50 years in business. He was also a member of the Boston Club.

=== Death and legacy ===
Parker died in 1884 at age 80. A funeral was held at the Arlington Street Church; the facade of the Parker House was "heavily draped" in mourning. He was buried at Mount Auburn Cemetery. He left $100,000 to the Museum of Fine Arts, Boston, providing funds for objects in the museum's Harvey D. Parker Collection.
