= Robert Rowling =

American billionaire businessman

- Born: 1953 (age 72–73); El Paso, Texas, US
- Education: University of Texas at Austin; Southern Methodist University
- Occupation: Businessman
- Title: Founder, TRT Holdings
- Spouse: Terry Hennersdorf
- Children: 2
- Parent: Reese Rowling

Robert B. Rowling (born 1953) is an American billionaire businessman, and the founder of TRT Holdings, the holding company of Omni Hotels & Resorts.

== Early life ==
A native of Corpus Christi, Texas, Rowling has an undergraduate degree from the University of Texas at Austin and a doctorate in jurisprudence from Southern Methodist University.

== Career ==
In 1972, Rowling began working for Tana Oil and Gas, which was owned by his father, Reese Rowling, and William E Colson. In 1989 Texaco acquired Tana for $476 million, thereby providing money that was used to form TRT Holdings. Five years later, TRT Holdings sold Corpus Christi National Bank to NationsBank for $131 million. TRT Holdings would later purchase Omni Hotels & Resorts for $500 million and Gold's Gym for $180 million. In August 2010, Rowling made the winning bid to acquire the bankrupt Amelia Island Plantation Resort for $67.1 million. In July 2013, Rowling purchased six resorts from KSL Resorts including The Homestead 1766 in Hot Springs, Virginia.

Rowling served as a regent to the University of Texas System until February 2009 when he resigned over a controversy regarding bonuses paid to the UTIMCO investment staff. Governor Rick Perry and Texas state senators had sought to go back on compensation agreements with the staff. Unwilling to break the contracts and disgusted by their grandstanding, Rowling quit during a Texas Senate Finance Committee meeting and followed it up a day later with a formal letter of resignation

As of September 2025, Rawling had a net worth of US$8.8 billion and was ranked number 149 on the Forbes 400 list of the richest people in the United States.

== Political activities ==
He is a conservative Republican and a major donor to the party. He is also one of four billionaire backers of the conservative political action committee (PAC) American Crossroads. According to Forbes, four San Francisco Gold's Gym franchises split off from the brand after Rowling made a $2 million donation to Karl Rove's American Crossroads PAC, sparking protest from gay rights advocates. Speaking to Fox News, Rowling claimed that his donation to American Crossroads had nothing to do with social policies: "I've never heard one discussion of a social issue. This is all about fiscal sanity."

In April 2020, Governor Greg Abbott named Rowling to the Strike Force to Open Texas – a group "tasked with finding safe and effective ways to slowly reopen the state" amid the COVID-19 pandemic.

== Personal life ==
He is married to Terry Hennersdorf Rowling, they have two children, and live in Dallas, Texas. They met when they were both studying for their bachelor's degrees in business at the University of Texas at Austin.
