= Swerdlow =

Swerdlow is a surname. It is an altered form of the surname Sverdlov. Notable people with the surname include:

- Amy Swerdlow, American activist
- Anthony Swerdlow, British epidemiologist
- Ezra Swerdlow (1953–2018), American film producer
- Jenna Rose Swerdlow (born 1998), American singer
- Joel Swerdlow, American journalist
- Mark Swerdlow (1918–2003), British consultant anaesthetist
- Michael Swerdlow (born 1943), American real estate developer
- Noel Swerdlow (1941–2021), American academic
- Tommy Swerdlow (born 1962), American screenwriter
