= List of Boston Latin School alumni =

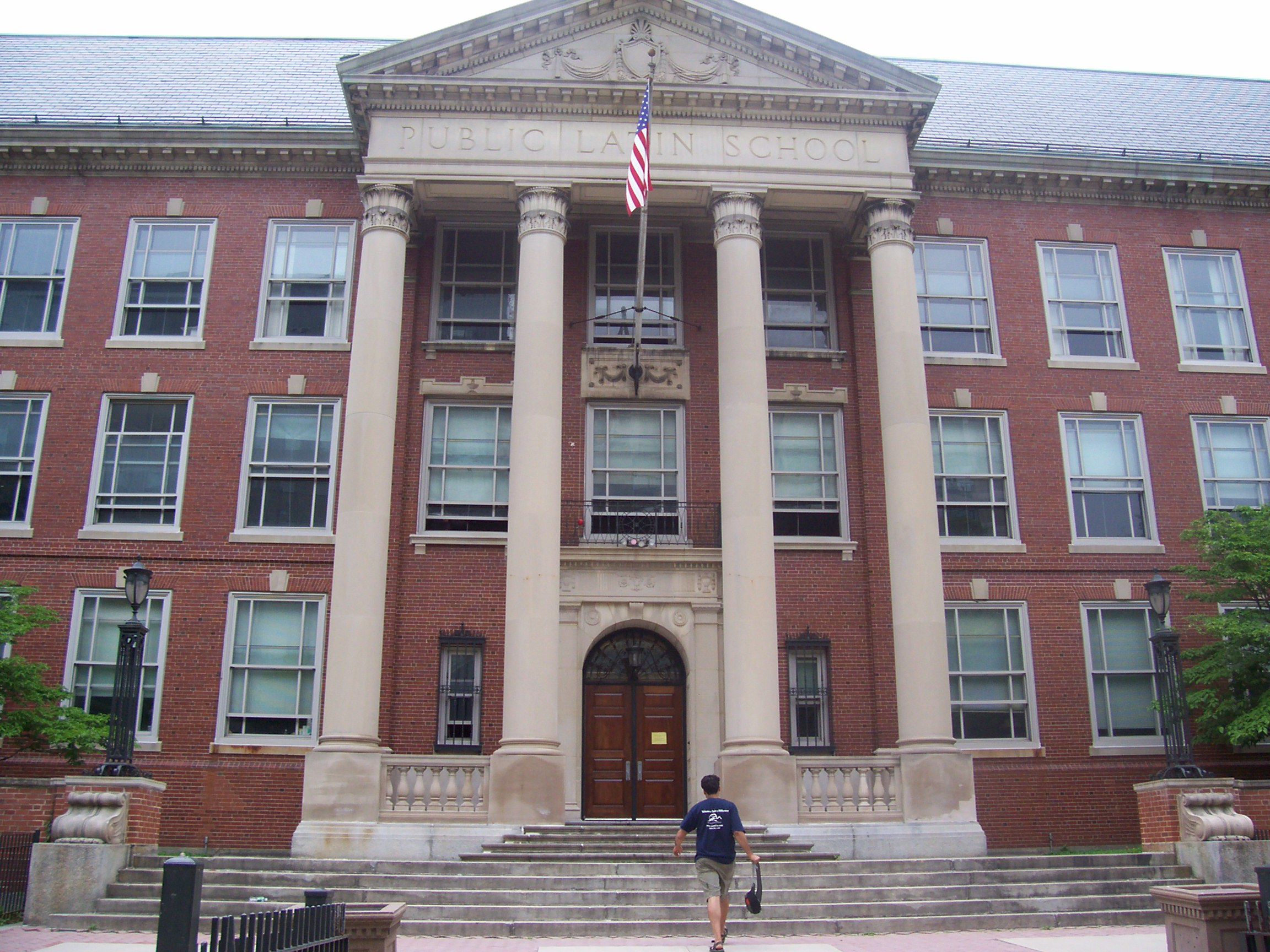
The front entrance to Boston Latin School on Avenue Louis Pasteur

Boston Latin School is a public exam school located in Boston, Massachusetts, that was founded in 1635. It is the first public school and the oldest existing school in the United States.

The school's first class included nine students; the school now has 2,400 pupils drawn from all parts of Boston. Its graduates have included four Harvard presidents, eight Massachusetts state governors, and five signers of the United States Declaration of Independence, as well as several preeminent architects, a leading art historian, a notable naturalist and the conductors of the New York Philharmonic and Boston Pops orchestras. There are also several notable non-graduate alumni, including Louis Farrakhan, a leader of the Nation of Islam. Boston Latin admitted only male students at its founding in 1635. The school's first female student was admitted in the nineteenth century. In 1972, Boston Latin admitted its first co-educational class.

Admission is determined by a combination of a student's score on the independent school Entrance Examination and recent grades, and is limited to residents of the city of Boston. Although Boston Latin runs from the 7th through the 12th grade, it admits students only into the 7th and 9th grades. In 2007, the school was named one of the top twenty high schools in the United States by U.S. News & World Report.

== Alumni ==
=== Graduate alumni ===
Image	Name	Class year	Notability	Reference(s)
—	Edwin Hale Abbot	1854	Lawyer, railroad executive	
Charles Francis Adams Jr.	Charles Francis Adams Jr.	—^{[a]}	Union Army general	
Charles Francis Adams Sr.	Charles Francis Adams Sr.	1819	U.S. congressman, ambassador to Great Britain	
Samuel Adams	Samuel Adams	1729	Governor of Massachusetts, Boston Tea Party organizer	
Ed Ames	Ed Ames	—^{[a]}	Popular singer, actor	
James Barnes	James Barnes	—^{[a]}	Union Army general	
John L. Bates	John L. Bates	1819	Governor of Massachusetts	
Henry Ward Beecher	Henry Ward Beecher	1826	Congregationalist clergyman, social reformer, abolitionist, speaker	
Jonathan Belcher	Jonathan Belcher	1689	Colonial governor of Massachusetts, New Hampshire, New Jersey	
Bernard Berenson	Bernard Berenson	—^{[a]}	Art historian	
Leonard Bernstein	Leonard Bernstein	1935	Conductor, composer, author, music lecturer, pianist	
George Tyler Bigelow	George Tyler Bigelow	1824	Chief justice of the Massachusetts Supreme Judicial Court	
Edwin Blashfield	Edwin Blashfield	1861	Artist	
James Bowdoin	James Bowdoin	1734	Governor of Massachusetts	
Thomas Mayo Brewer	Thomas Mayo Brewer	1826	Naturalist	
Phillips Brooks	Phillips Brooks	1846	Bishop of Massachusetts in the Episcopal Church	
—	Robert A. Brooks	1949	Telecommunications pioneer	
Charles Bulfinch	Charles Bulfinch	1770	Architect of the U.S. Capitol	
Thomas Bulfinch	Thomas Bulfinch	—^{[a]}	Mythologist, banker	
Andrea Campbell	Andrea Campbell	2000	Lawyer and politician (Massachusetts attorney general and former Boston City Council member)	
Francis James Child	Francis James Child	1840	Scholar, educationist, folklorist	
James Freeman Clarke	James Freeman Clarke	1821	Unitarian clergyman, author	
Richard A. Clarke	Richard A. Clarke	1968	Chief counter-terrorism adviser on the U.S. National Security Council	
—	Marshall Cogan	1955	Investor, banker, entrepreneur; founder of United Automotive Group and investment banking firm Cogan, Berlind, Weill & Levitt	
—	Cid Corman	—^{[a]}	Poet, translator, editor	
Joseph W. Cullen	Joseph W. Cullen	1954	Cancer researcher and scientist	
Thomas Cushing	Thomas Cushing	1740	Acting governor of Massachusetts	
Timothy Cutler	Timothy Cutler	1690	Episcopal clergyman and rector of Yale College	
Martin J. Dain	Martin J. Dain	1943	American photographer and photojournalist	
Francis Dana	Francis Dana	1751	Lawyer, jurist, statesman, delegate to the Continental Congress	
Charles Henry Davis	Charles Henry Davis	1815	Rear admiral in the United States Navy	
Charles Devens	Charles Devens	1829	Lawyer, jurist, statesman, Union Army general	
—	Paul A. Dever	1918	Governor of Massachusetts	
—	Edward Payson Dutton	1844	Book publisher	
Ayo Edebiri	Ayo Edebiri	2013	Comedian, writer, producer, and actress	
Charles William Eliot	Charles William Eliot	1844	President of Harvard University	
Samuel Atkins Eliot	Samuel Atkins Eliot	1809	U.S. congressman, mayor of Boston	
Ralph Waldo Emerson	Ralph Waldo Emerson	1817	Essayist, philosopher, poet, orator, leader of the Transcendentalist movement, Unitarian clergyman	
William Eustis	William Eustis	1761	Governor of Massachusetts, United States secretary of war	
William Maxwell Evarts	William Maxwell Evarts	1828	United States attorney general, secretary of state	
Edward Everett	Edward Everett	1805	Governor of Massachusetts, U.S. secretary of state, U.S. senator	
William Everett	William Everett	1852	U.S. congressman	
Frederick Winthrop Faxon	Frederick Winthrop Faxon	1885	Bibliographer, publisher, owner of F. W. Faxon Publishing Company, secretary of the American Library Association	
—	Aaron Feuerstein	1943	Owner and CEO of Malden Mills	
—	Arthur Fiedler	1907	Conductor of the Boston Pops Orchestra	
—	Thomas Finneran	1967	Speaker of the Massachusetts House of Representatives	
John F. Fitzgerald	John F. Fitzgerald	1880	Mayor of Boston, U.S. congressman	
—	Tom Fitzgerald	1929	The Boston Globe sports journalist and recipient of the Lester Patrick Trophy and the Elmer Ferguson Memorial Award	
—	John Bernard Fitzpatrick	1826	Roman Catholic Bishop of Boston	
James Freeman	James Freeman	1766	Unitarian clergyman and writer	
James A. Gallivan	James A. Gallivan	1884	U.S. congressman	
—	Dave Gettleman	1968	General manager of the New York Giants	
Christopher Gore	Christopher Gore	1765	Governor of Massachusetts, U.S. senator	
Nathaniel Gorham	Nathaniel Gorham	1746	President of the Continental Congress, signer of the United States Constitution	
—	Mike Gorman	1965	Television play-by-play commentator for the Boston Celtics	
Benjamin A. Gould	Benjamin A. Gould	1835	Astronomer	
Robert Grant	Robert Grant	—^{[a]}	Novelist, probate court judge	
John Chipman Gray	John Chipman Gray	—^{[a]}	Harvard Law School professor	
—	Adolphus W. Green	1859	Attorney, businessman, founder of Nabisco	
—	Richard Saltonstall Greenough	1829	Sculptor	
Edward Everett Hale	Edward Everett Hale	1831	Author, Unitarian clergyman	
Franklin Elmer Ellsworth Hamilton	Franklin Elmer Ellsworth Hamilton	1883	Bishop of the Methodist Episcopal Church	
John Hancock	John Hancock	1745	Merchant, president of the Second Continental Congress, first governor of Massachusetts	
—	Nat Hentoff	1941	Historian, novelist, jazz critic, columnist, civil libertarian	
Henry Lee Higginson	Henry Lee Higginson	1846	Businessman, philanthropist, founder of the Boston Symphony Orchestra	
William Hooper	William Hooper	1749	Member of the Continental Congress, signer of the U.S. Declaration of Independence	
Samuel Gridley Howe	Samuel Gridley Howe	—^{[a]}	Physician, abolitionist, advocate of education for the blind	
—	John Hull	1637	Merchant, military officer, and politician in the Massachusetts Bay Colony	
—	Leavitt Hunt	1839	Attorney, photography pioneer, brother of Richard Morris Hunt	
Richard Morris Hunt	Richard Morris Hunt	1843	Architect, founder of the American Institute of Architects and the Municipal Art Society	
Thomas Hutchinson	Thomas Hutchinson	1716	Colonial governor of Massachusetts	
—	Charles Jackson	1784	Jurist, judge of the Massachusetts Supreme Judicial Court	
Joseph Kennedy	Joseph Kennedy	1908	Businessman, U.S. ambassador to the United Kingdom, first chairman of the Securities and Exchange Commission	
John King	John King	1981	Journalist, reporter	
Henry Knox	Henry Knox	1758	Bookseller, chief artillery officer of the Continental Army, first U.S. secretary of war	
—	Yehuda Krinsky	—^{[a]}	Chabad Lubavitch Hasidic rabbi	
—	Philip J. Landrigan	1959	Epidemiologist, pediatrician	
—	Samuel Langdon	1734	US Congregational clergyman, president of Harvard University	
—	William L. Langer	1912	Chairman of the history department at Harvard University, head of the Research and Analysis branch of the Office of Strategic Services	
Samuel Pierpoint Langley	Samuel Pierpoint Langley	1845	Astronomer, physicist, inventor of the bolometer, pioneer of aviation	
—	Joseph R. Levenson	1937	University of California, Berkeley historian of China	
—	Norman B. Leventhal	1933	Developer and manager of office buildings, housing, and hotels	
John Leverett the Younger	John Leverett the Younger	1669	President of Harvard College	
—	Howard Lindsay	1907	Broadway producer, playwright, librettist, director, actor	
James Lloyd	James Lloyd	1776	U.S. senator	
Edward Lawrence Logan	Edward Lawrence Logan	1894	Militia officer, jurist; namesake of Logan International Airport	
Ruthzee Louijeune	Ruthzee Louijeune	2004	At-large Boston City Council member	
—	James Lovell	1744	Educator, delegate to the Continental Congress	
Augustus Lowell	Augustus Lowell	—^{[a]}	Businessman, philanthropist	
—	Burton Malkiel	1949	Economist, author of A Random Walk Down Wall Street	
—	Charles F. Manski	1966	Econometrician	
Jonathan Mason	Jonathan Mason	1774	U.S. senator	
Cotton Mather	Cotton Mather	1669	New England Puritan minister, author, pamphleteer	
Christine Elise McCarthy	Christine Elise McCarthy	1983	Film and television actress	
Wade McCree Jr.	Wade McCree Jr.	1937	First African-American judge appointed to the U.S. Court of Appeals for the 6th Circuit; second African-American solicitor general	
Robert F. McDermott	Robert F. McDermott	1955	Brigadier general; first permanent dean of the faculty at the United States Air Force Academy; chairman and CEO of USAA	
James F. McNulty Jr.	James F. McNulty Jr.	1943	U.S. congressman from Arizona	
Martin Milmore	Martin Milmore	1859	Sculptor	
—	Paul Mockapetris	1966	Inventor of the Domain Name System	
Alfred Moore	Alfred Moore	1763	Associate justice of the United States Supreme Court	
—	Hosea Ballou Morse	1866	Sinologist, Chinese Maritime Customs Service	
Perez Morton	Perez Morton	1760	Lawyer; patriot during the Revolution	
John Lothrop Motley	John Lothrop Motley	1824	Historian	
—	Darragh Murphy		Activist, founder and head of PUMA PAC	
Barry Newman	Barry Newman	1948	Actor	
—	Jack O'Callahan	1975	Professional ice hockey player and member of the 1980 Winter Olympics United States national team	
—	David Ochterlony	1766	British general	
Andrew Oliver	Andrew Oliver	1713	Merchant, public official	
Harrison Gray Otis	Harrison Gray Otis	1773	Federalist party leader, U.S. senator, mayor of Boston	
Robert Treat Paine	Robert Treat Paine	1738	Signer of the Declaration of Independence, speaker of the Massachusetts House of Representatives	
—	Isaac Parker	1777	U.S. congressman	
—	William Parmenter	1800	U.S. congressman	
—	William Dandridge Peck	1771	America's first native entomologist, professor at Harvard College	
Wendell Phillips	Wendell Phillips	1822	Abolitionist, advocate for Native Americans, orator	
Edward Charles Pickering	Edward Charles Pickering	1857	Astronomer, physicist	
William Dummer Powell	William Dummer Powell	1762	Lawyer, judge, political figure in Upper Canada	
—	J. Pickering Putnam	1860	Architect and designer	
Josiah Quincy II	Josiah Quincy II	1754	Lawyer	
—	Sumner Redstone	1940	Majority owner and chairman of the board of National Amusements; majority owner of CBS Corporation, Viacom, MTV Networks, BET, Paramount Pictures, and DreamWorks	
Vivian Rich	Vivian Rich	1911	Silent film actress	
—	George T. Richardson	188?	Journalist, playwright, theatre critic	
Marie Mercury Roth	Marie Mercury Roth		Synthetic organic chemist	
—	Stan Salett	1955	National education policy advisor (an architect of Upward Bound, Head Start); civil rights organizer; author	
—	George Sanderson		Pennsylvania state senator and 10th mayor of Lancaster, Pennsylvania	
George Santayana	George Santayana	1878	Philosopher, essayist, poet, novelist	
Winthrop Sargent	Winthrop Sargent	—^{[a]}	Secretary of Northwest Territory, governor of Mississippi Territory	
—	Benjamin I. Schwartz	1934	Harvard University historian of China	
Roger Hale Sheaffe	Roger Hale Sheaffe	1770	American-born general in the British Army	
Nathaniel B. Shurtleff	Nathaniel B. Shurtleff	1822	Twentieth mayor of Boston	
Samuel Francis Smith	Samuel Francis Smith	1828	Baptist minister, journalist, author, wrote lyrics of "My Country, 'Tis of Thee"	
—	Guy L. Steele Jr.	1972	Computer scientist	
—	Julian Steele	1925	Social worker and activist, Massachusetts' first African-American town moderator, state agency head	
Raymond Bartlett Stevens	Raymond Bartlett Stevens	—^{[a]}	U.S. congressman from New Hampshire	
Moorfield Storey	Moorfield Storey	—^{[a]}	Lawyer, publicist, and civil rights leader	
William Stoughton	William Stoughton	—^{[a]}	Judge during Salem Witch Trials; acting colonial governor of Massachusetts	
Charles Sumner	Charles Sumner	1821	U.S. senator, leader of the Radical Republicans	
—	Joseph Henry Thayer	1842	Biblical scholar	
Edward D. Townsend	Edward D. Townsend	—^{[a]}	Adjutant general of the United States Army, 1869–1880	
Edward Tuckerman	Edward Tuckerman	1827	Botanist, professor	
Frederic Tudor	Frederic Tudor	1793	Founder of the Tudor Ice Company	
—	William Tudor	1758	Lawyer	
—	Isadore Twersky	—^{[a]}	Professor of Hebrew Literature and Philosophy at Harvard University	
Royall Tyler	Royall Tyler	1765	Jurist, playwright	
—	Henry Van Brunt	1844	Architect, architectural writer	
—	Andrew Viterbi	1952	Electrical engineer, philanthropist	
John Collins Warren	John Collins Warren	1786	Surgeon, pioneer of ether anesthesia	
—	Clifton R. Wharton Jr.	1943	Economist, first African-American university president and chairman of a Fortune 100 corporation, United States deputy secretary of state	
Helen Magill White	Helen Magill White	—^{[a]}	First woman in the United States to earn a PhD	
—	Theodore White	1932	Political journalist, historian, novelist	
Robert Charles Winthrop	Robert Charles Winthrop	1821	Speaker of the United States House of Representatives, U.S. senator	
—	John Joseph Wright	1927	Prelate of the Roman Catholic Church, prefect of the Congregation for the Clergy	
—	Daniel Yankelovich	1942	Public opinion analyst, social scientist	

a ^{1} ^{2} ^{3} ^{4} ^{5} ^{6} ^{7} ^{8} "—" indicates the year of graduation is unknown.

=== Non-graduate alumni ===
Image	Name	Class year	Notability	Reference(s)
—	Walter A. Brown	—	Original owner of the Boston Celtics	
Louis Farrakhan	Louis Farrakhan	—	National representative of the Nation of Islam and Elijah Muhammad	
Torin Francis	Torin Francis	—	Professional basketball player	
Benjamin Franklin	Benjamin Franklin	—	Founding Father of the United States, polymath, author, printer, satirist, political theorist, politician, scientist, inventor, civic activist, statesman, diplomat	
Mike Sherman	Mike Sherman	—	Head coach of the Texas A&M Aggies football team	
