= School Street =

Street in Boston, Massachusetts

Coordinates: 42°21′27.5″N 71°3′34.84″W

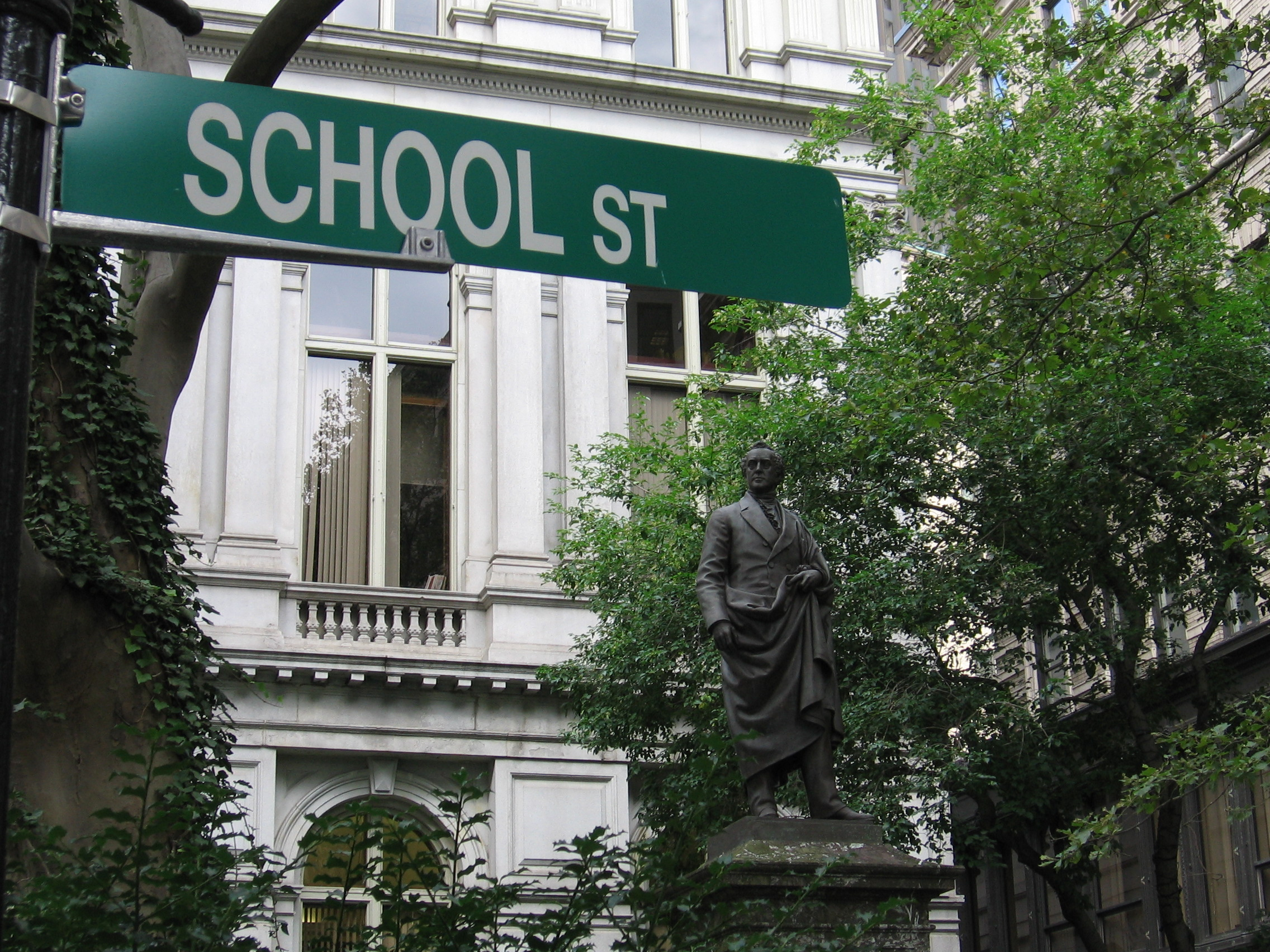
- School Street
- Interactive map of School Street
- Location: Boston
- West end: Tremont Street
- East end: Washington Street

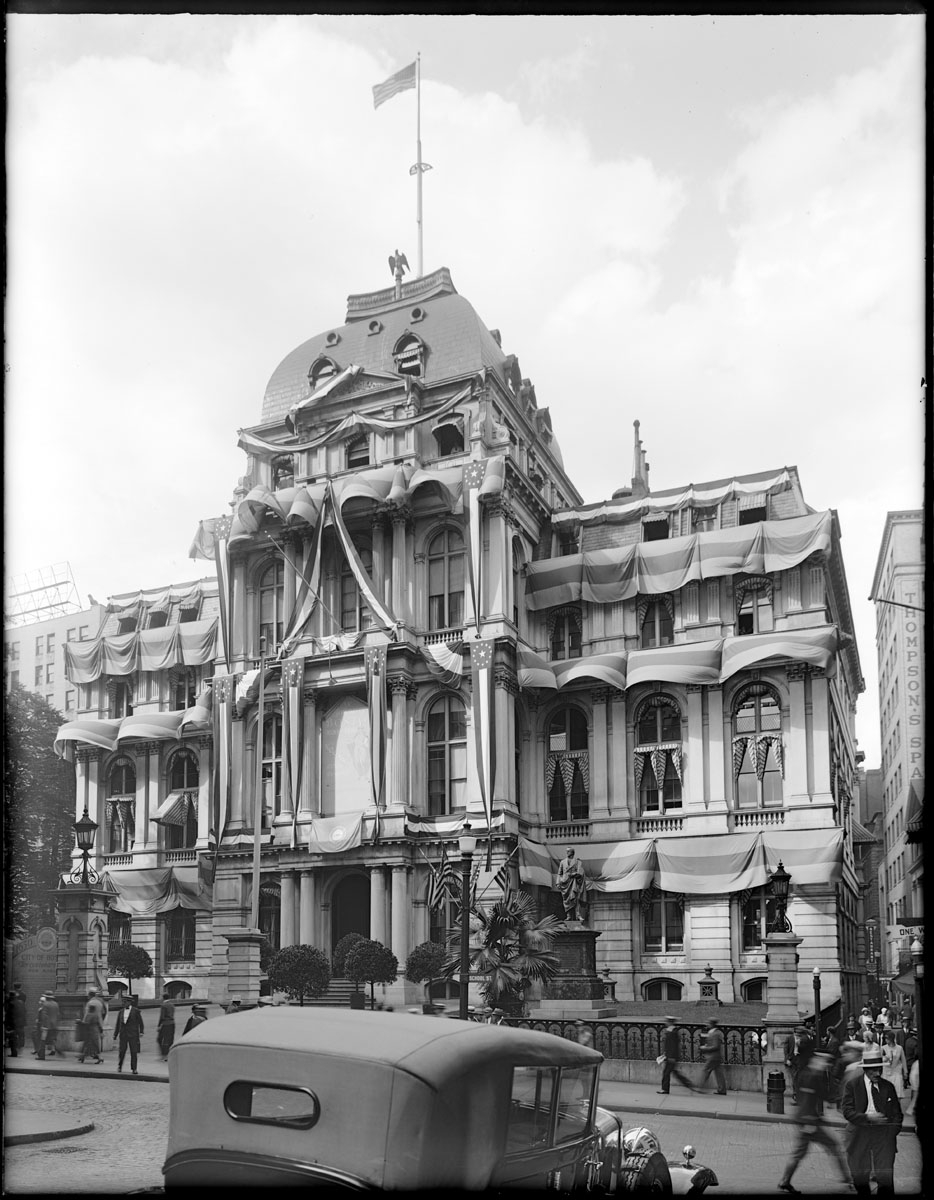
Old City Hall in 1930

School Street is a short but significant street in the center of Boston, Massachusetts. It is so named for being the site of the first public school in the United States (the Boston Latin School, since relocated). The school operated at various addresses on the street from 1704 to 1844.

Effectively a southeastern extension of Beacon Street, School Street runs one or two blocks (it is bisected by Province Street on one side) from Tremont Street to Washington Street. Along the way, it passes King's Chapel, Boston's Old City Hall (on the first public school site), and the historic Old Corner Bookstore.

The Parker House hotel, 19th-century meeting place of politicians and literary figures as well as the origin point of several famous local dishes, is also located along the street.

The entirety of the street is part of the Freedom Trail, a walking path that leads tourists to historic sites in the center of the city.

== Timeline ==
=== 17th–18th centuries ===
- 1635 – Gaol begins operating in vicinity.
- 1688 – King's Chapel built.
- 1708 – Officially named "School Street."
- 1711 – October 2: Fire.
- 1716 – Governors' Province House in use near School Street.
- 1729
  - South Meeting House built near School Street.
  - Samuel Adams graduates from Latin School.
- 1748 – Latin Schoolhouse built.
- 1750 – John Hancock graduates from Latin School.
- 1754 – King's Chapel rebuilt in stone.
- 1772 – King's Chapel bell installed.
- 1798 – Massachusetts State House built at top of hill in vicinity of School Street.

=== 19th century ===
- 1804 – Union Circulating Library in business.
- 1810 – County courthouse built.
- 1817 – Second Universalist Church consecrated.
- 1827 – Tremont Theatre opens in vicinity of School Street.
- 1833 – Harding's Gallery of art active (approximate date).
- 1841
  - City Hall moves to School Street.
  - Boston Museum opens near School Street.
- 1844 – Latin School moves away from School Street.
- 1845 – Horticultural Hall built.
- 1854 – Ticknor and Fields publisher in business in the Corner Bookstore.
- 1855
  - Parker House hotel in business.
  - Saturday Club founded.
- 1857 – Benjamin Franklin statue erected in front of City Hall.
- 1858 – Boston Five Cents Savings Bank built.
- 1865 – City Hall rebuilt.
- 1868 – Charles Dickens stays at Parker House.
- 1872 – November 9: Great Boston Fire occurs in vicinity, just missing School Street.
- 1885 – Hugh O'Brien becomes mayor.

=== 20th century ===
- 1906 – John F. Fitzgerald becomes mayor.
- 1914 – James Michael Curley becomes mayor.
- 1920 – Charles Ponzi moved his fraud "Securities Exchange Company" to the Niles building on School Street.
- 1930 – Boston Public Library's Kirstein Business Branch opens off School Street.
- 1958 – Freedom Trail stripe painted.
- 1969 – City hall moves away from School Street.
- 1972 – Maison Robert restaurant in business.
- 1973 – Boston Five Cents Savings Bank rebuilt.
- 1982 – Globe Corner Bookstore in business.

== See also ==
Past tenants/activities

- Boston True Flag (c. 1852–1864)
- Richard Clarke (merchant) lived on School St., 18th century
- Mrs. Abner Haven's cafe, 19th century
- Merry's Museum published on School St. in the 1840s
- Moses B. Russell, miniature painter, 19th century
- Antoine Sonrel ran a photography studio, 1860s
- Watch and Ward Society, circa 1890s–1900s

== Images ==
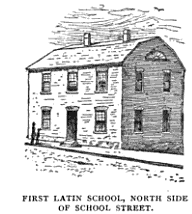
Boston Latin School, 17th century

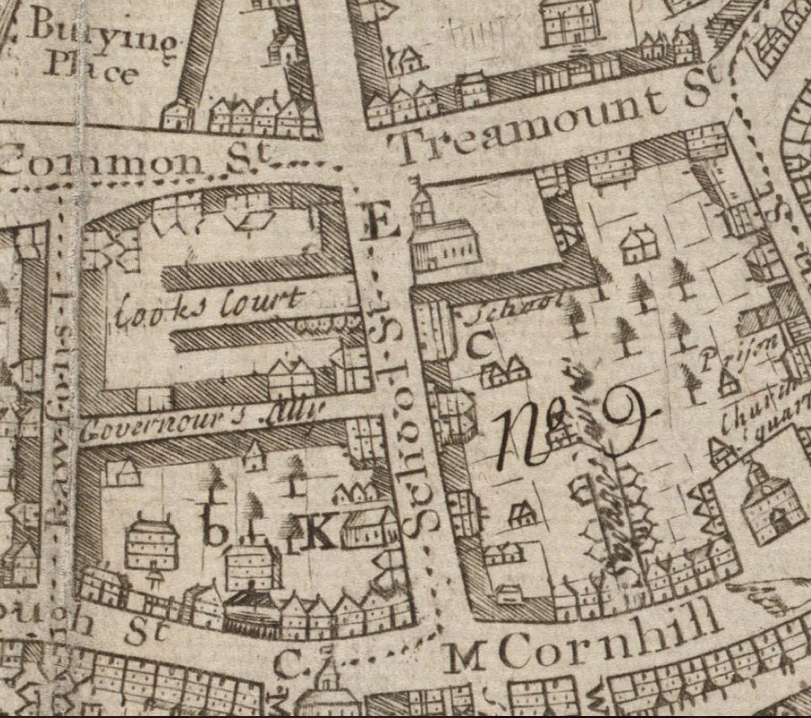
Detail of 1743 map of Boston by William Price, showing School Street and vicinity

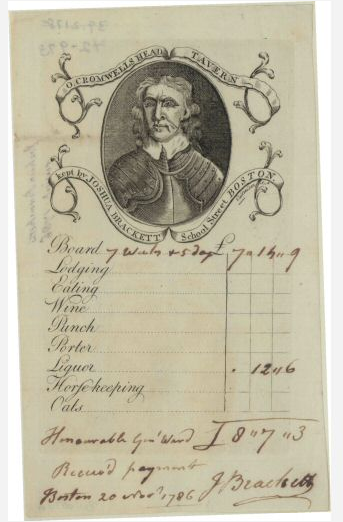
Bill from Cromwell's Head Tavern, 1768

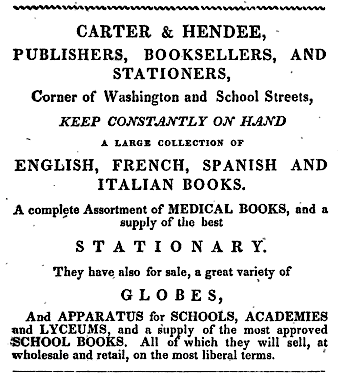
Ad for Carter & Hendee, booksellers; Washington St. and School St., Boston, 1832

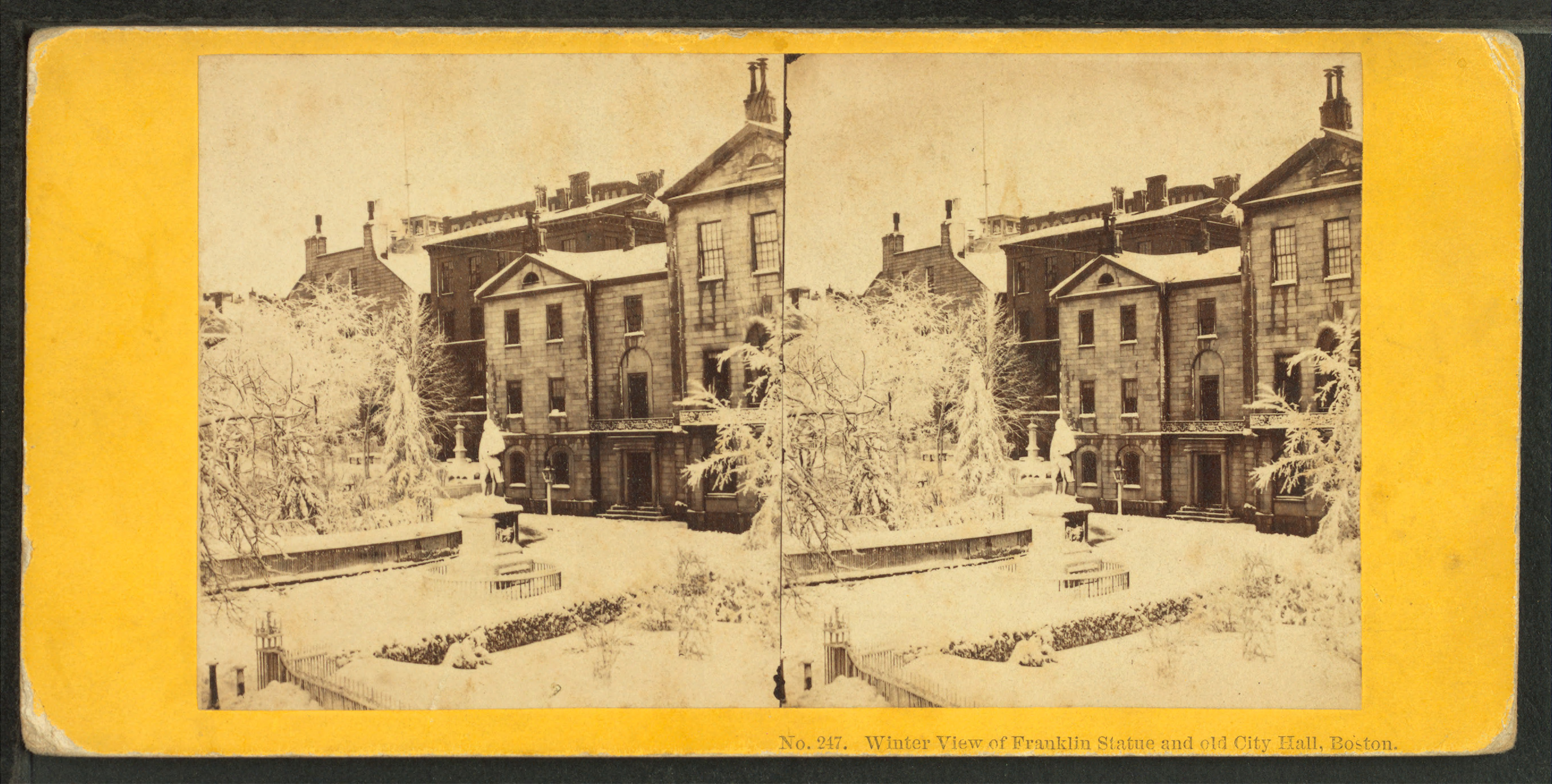
Winter view of Franklin statue and City Hall, 19th century, by John P. Soule

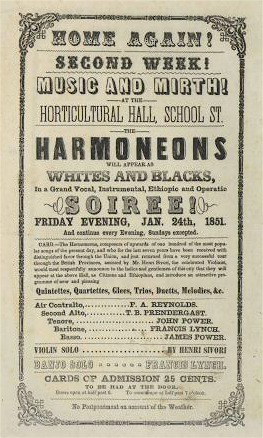
Harmoneons performing at Horticultural Hall, 1851

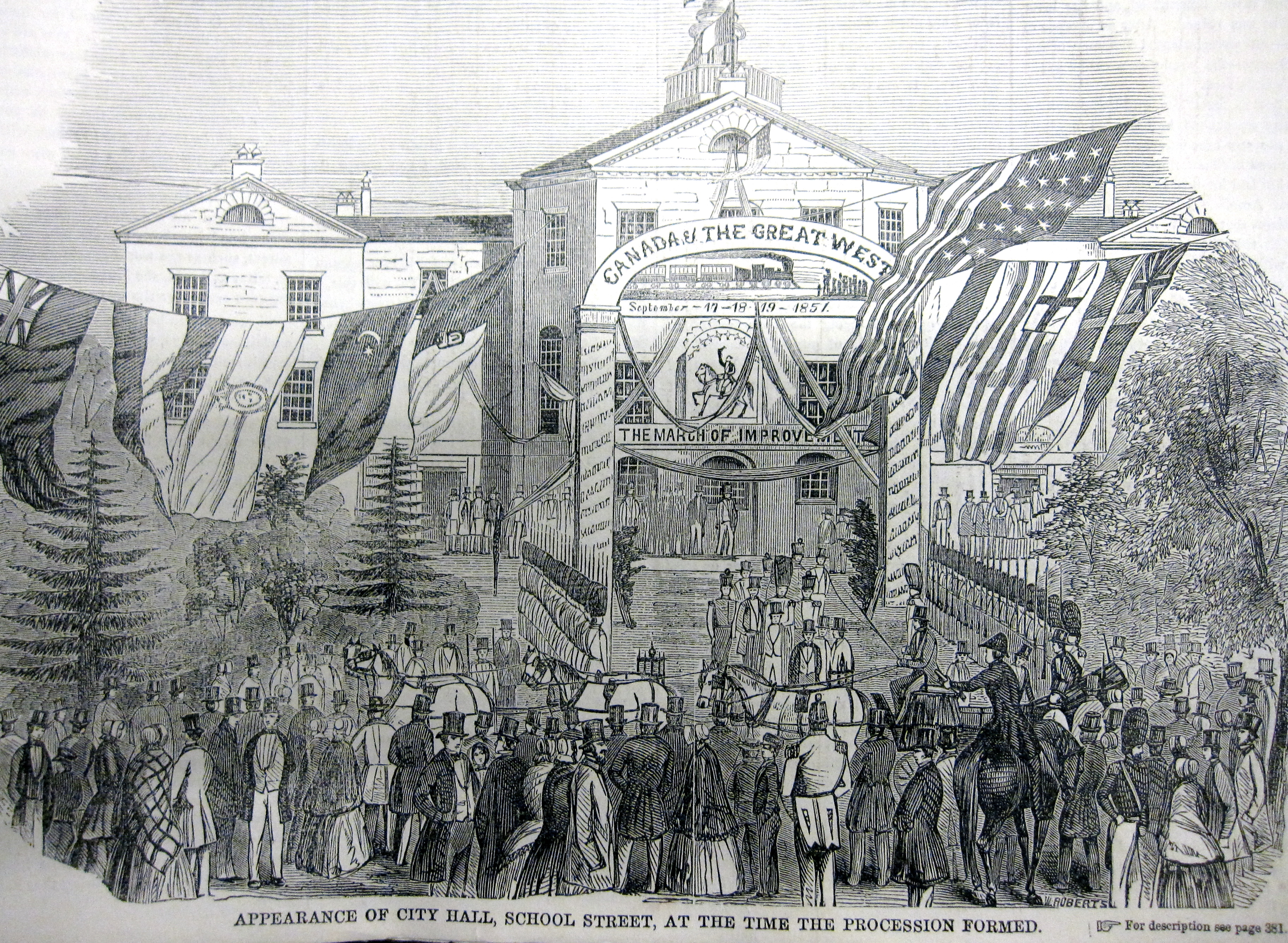
Railroad Jubilee, procession forming at City Hall, 1854 (from Gleason's Pictorial)

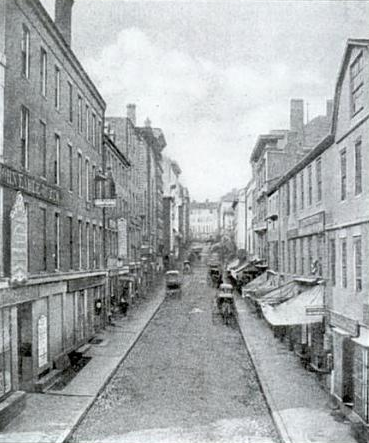
School St., 1858

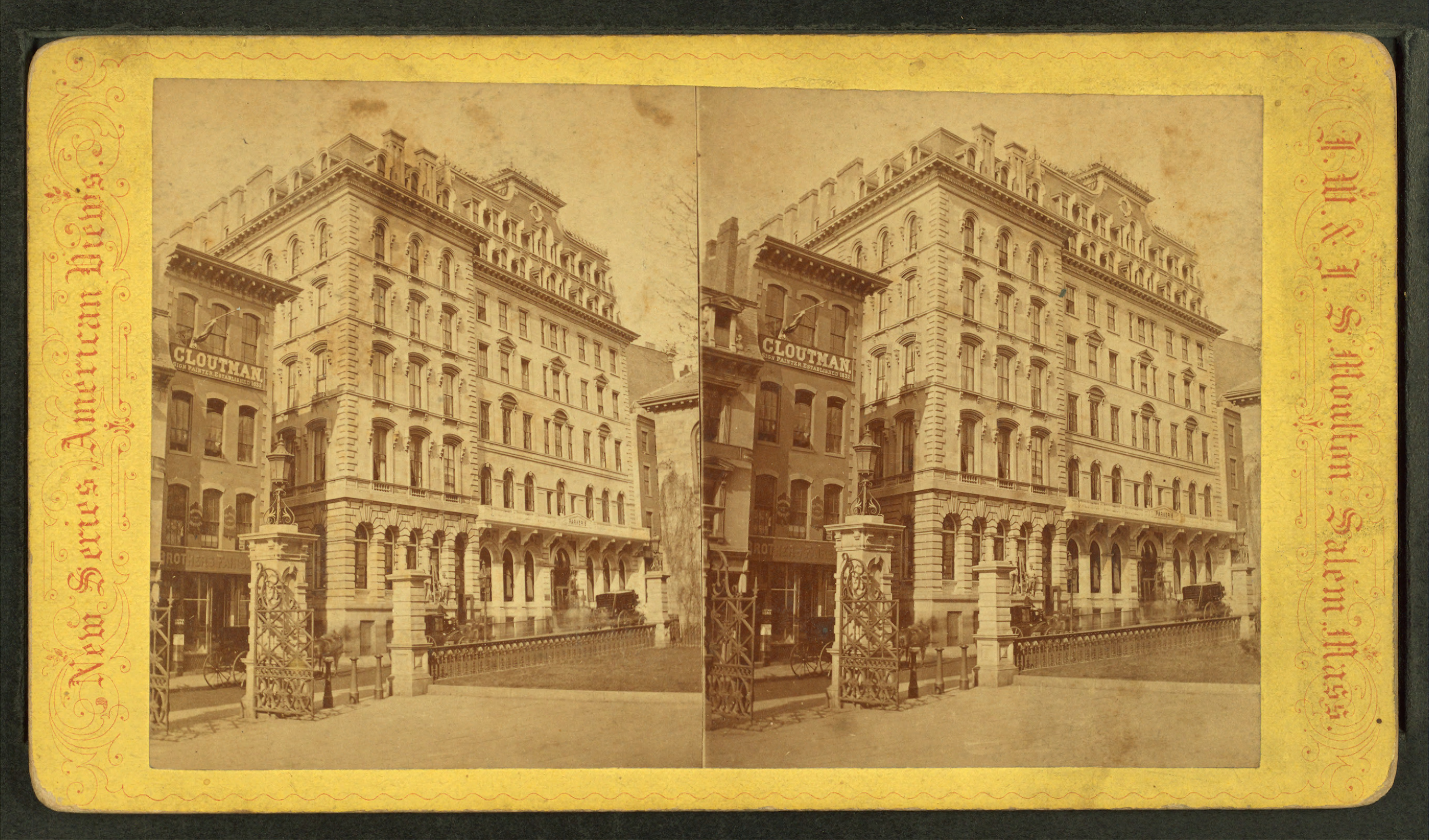
Parker House, 19th century

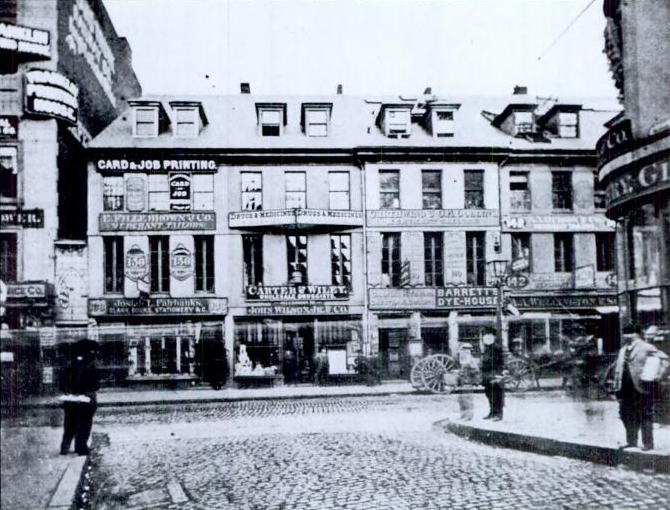
Intersection of Washington St. and School St., 19th century

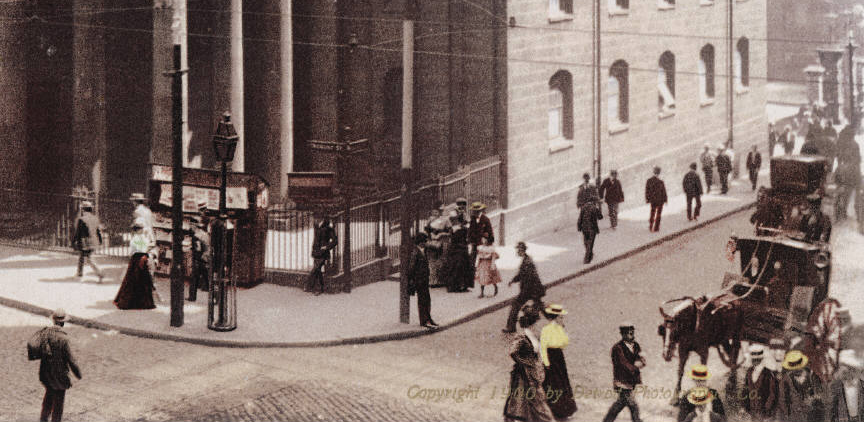
Corner of School and Tremont Streets, 1900
