= Joseph Cullen (disambiguation) =

Joseph Cullen (1849–1917) was an Australian politician.

Joseph Cullen may also refer to:

- Joseph W. Cullen (1936–1990), American cancer researcher
- Joseph Cullen (Australian politician), one of the Members of the New South Wales Legislative Assembly, 1894–1895
- Joseph Cullen (footballer) for New Jersey Blaze

== See also ==
- Joe Cullen (disambiguation)
