= Interphone =

Interphone may refer to:

- Intercom, a stand-alone voice communications system for use within a building, small collection of buildings or portably within a small coverage area
- Interphone study, a set of international case-control studies conducted with the aim of determining whether mobile phone use increased the risk of certain tumors

== See also ==
- Interphon Records, an American record label
