= Stephen Hecht =

American chemist

Stephen Samuel Hecht
- Education: Duke University, Massachusetts Institute of Technology
- Spouse: Sharon E. Murphy
- Awards: Fellow of the American Association for the Advancement of Science since 2014, American Society of Preventive Oncology's Joseph Cullen Award (2012), American Chemical Society Division of Chemical Toxicology Founders' Award (2009), National Cancer Institute Merit Award (2004)
- Scientific career
- Fields: Chemistry, pathology, toxicology
- Institutions: University of Minnesota
- Thesis: Part I: A̲protic decomposition of 2-phenyl-cyclooctanone p̲-toluene-sulfonylhydrazone; and 3-phenylycyclooctanone p̲-toluenesulfonylhy-drazone; part II: Oxadiaziridines: synthesis and reactivity. (1968)

Stephen S. Hecht is an American chemist and cancer researcher. He is the Wallin Land Grant Professor of Cancer Prevention in the Department of Laboratory Medicine and Pathology at the University of Minnesota. He is also a member of the University of Minnesota's Medicinal Chemistry graduate program, as well as the Program Leader of the Carcinogenesis and Chemoprevention Program of the Masonic Cancer Center. Since January 2013, he has also been the editor-in-chief of Chemical Research in Toxicology.

== Research ==
Hecht's research focuses on the mechanisms whereby carcinogens in tobacco and the environment cause cancer. He has been studying the link between tobacco smoking and lung cancer for over four decades. For example, he has studied the ways in which certain people, such as babies whose mothers smoke during pregnancy, are exposed to carcinogens in tobacco.

== Honors and awards ==
In 2004, Hecht received a National Cancer Institute (NCI) Merit Award, and from 1987 to 2001, he received an Outstanding Investigator Grant from the NCI. In 2006, he received the American Association for Cancer Research's Award for Outstanding Achievement in Cancer Prevention Research. He has been a fellow of the American Chemical Society since 2009 and of the American Association for the Advancement of Science since 2014. In 2012, he received the American Society of Preventive Oncology's Joseph W. Cullen Award.
