= Anthony Swerdlow =

Anthony J. Swerdlow is a British epidemiologist and head of the epidemiology section at the Institute of Cancer Research in Sutton, London, England.

== Education and career ==
Swerdlow trained at Cambridge University and Oxford University, and worked at the University of Glasgow’s Department of Community Medicine and the Office of Population Censuses and Surveys early in his career. In 1987, he began working at the London School of Hygiene and Tropical Medicine, where he remained until joining the Institute of Cancer Research in 2000. He was elected a Fellow of the Academy of Medical Sciences in 2003.

== Research ==
Swerdlow has worked on a number of studies relating to the purported link between mobile phone use and cancer, including the Interphone Study.
