= James Silver =

Historian and writer (1907–1988)

James Wesley Silver (June 28, 1907 – July 25, 1988) also credited as Jim Silver was an American historian, academic, and author. He wrote Mississippi: The Closed Society. He was a professor at the University of Mississippi, then University of Notre Dame, and finally at the University of South Florida. He was targeted for firing despite his tenure at Ole Miss because of his support for civil rights.

== Career ==
Jim Silver was a professor at the University of Mississippi when rioting erupted on the Ole Miss campus after James Meredith became the University of Mississippi's first African-American student and federal troops moved in to keep order.

Silver befriended Meredith. In a speech to the Southern Historical Association in the Fall of 1963, he analyzed the violence with which Mississippi was resisting desegregation. Mississippi was, he said, "a closed society" -- "totalitarian," "monolithic," "corrupt." The speech received widespread media coverage, and Silver expanded his analysis in a book, Mississippi: The Closed Society (1964).

His advocacy of racial change subjected him to hostility in Mississippi, and even an attempt by the Mississippi State Sovereignty Commission to have him fired. That effort failed, but Silver took a job teaching at University of Notre Dame in Indiana.

Silver taught at Notre Dame from 1965 until 1969. He left Notre Dame to teach history at the University of South Florida until he retired in 1982.

Silver was a member of the American Academy of Arts and Sciences.

== Personal life ==
Silver corresponded with the president of Tougaloo College A. D. Beittel.

Photographer Martin J. Dain took photographs of him in Oxford, Mississippi.

== Writings ==
- Mississippi: The Closed Society (1964)
- Confederate Morale and Church Propaganda (1967)
- Life for the Confederacy (1974)
- Running Scared: Silver in Mississippi (1984)
