= Antoine Sonrel =

Antoine Sonrel (died 1879) was an illustrator, engraver, and photographer in Switzerland and Boston, Massachusetts, in the 19th century. He moved from Neuchâtel to the United States around the late 1840s, and was affiliated with Louis Agassiz throughout his career. (Note: Sometimes Sonrel's name appears (incorrectly) as "Antoine Sourel", "August Sonrel," "Auguste Sonrel" or "Antoine Sowrel.") As a photographer he created numerous carte de visite portraits in the 1860s and 1870s; subjects included his friend Agassiz, Oliver Wendell Holmes Sr., Oliver Wendell Holmes Jr., Abbott Lawrence Rotch, and sculptor Anne Whitney. (Note: Photos by Sonrel reside in the collections of the Massachusetts Historical Society, Smithsonian, Boston Athenaeum, and Harvard University.)

== Biography ==
Around the 1830s in Neuchâtel, Sonrel began creating scientific illustrations for Louis Agassiz. "Draftsmen of superior talent, trained ... to the greatest accuracy — Weber, Dinkel, and Sonrel — were constantly in [Agassiz's] employ at a regular salary. ... At the suggestion of Agassiz an extensive lithographic establishment was created in Neuchatel." Agassiz wrote in 1857: "I esteem myself happy to have been able to secure the continued assistance of my old friend, Mr. A. Sonrel, in drawing the zoological figures of my work. More than twenty years ago, he began to make illustrations for my European works; and ever since he has been engaged, with short interruptions, in executing drawings for me."

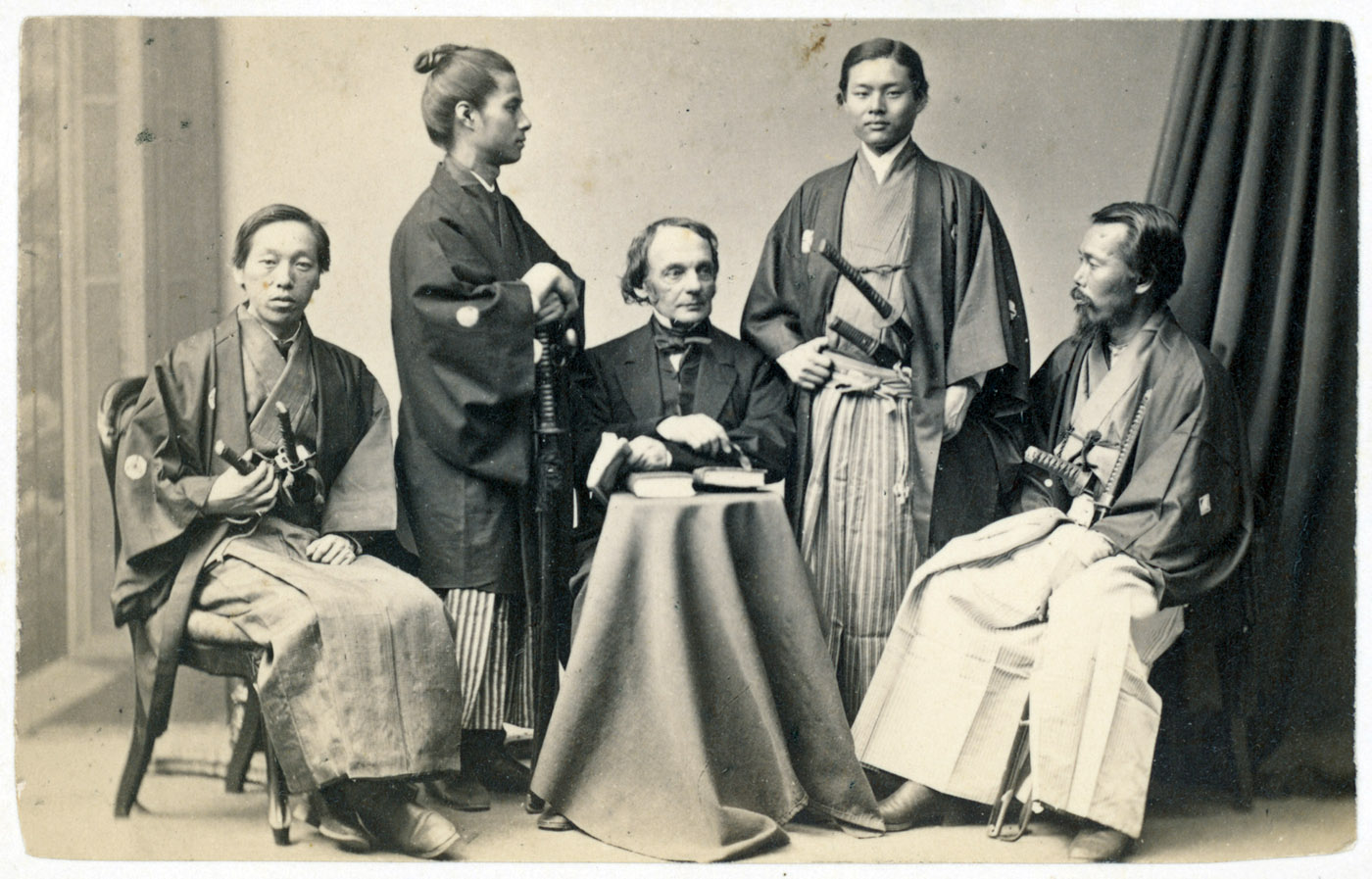
Portrait by Sonrel of C. K. Dillaway with Hanabusa Kotaro, Hiraga Isasaburo, Tsuge Zengo, and Aoki Yoshihira, 19th century (Smithsonian) (Note: For more information on Dillaway, see: "Dillaway, Charles K. (Charles Knapp) 1804-1889", WorldCat)

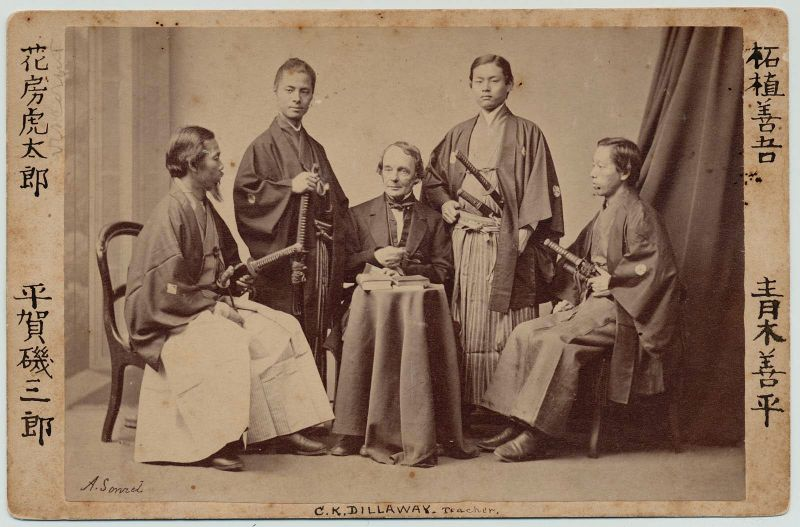
Portrait by Sonrel of C. K. Dillaway with Hanabusa Kotaro, Hiraga Isasaburo, Tsuge Zengo, and Aoki Yoshihira, 19th century (Museum of Fine Arts, Boston)

In the United States, Sonrel lived in Boston on Acorn Street in Beacon Hill (c. 1850), Tremont Street (c. 1873), and in Woburn, Massachusetts (c. 1852–1874). He kept a studio in Boston at 46 School Street (c. 1860s) and Washington Street (c. 1871–1874). Sonrel exhibited lithographs in the 1851 World's Fair in London and in the 1853 exhibition of the Massachusetts Charitable Mechanic Association.

== Image gallery ==
Works by Sonrel

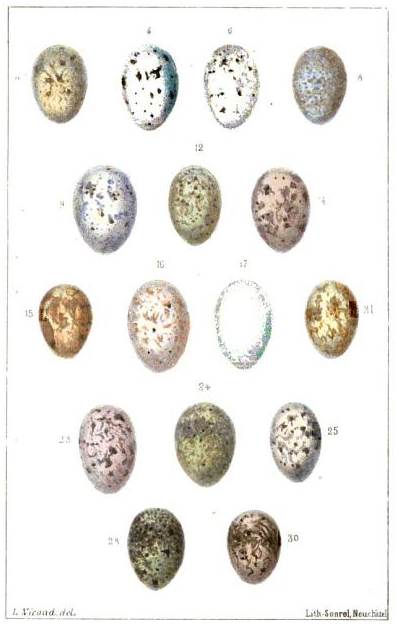
Oeufs de coucou, lithograph by "Sonrel, Neuchatel," 19th century

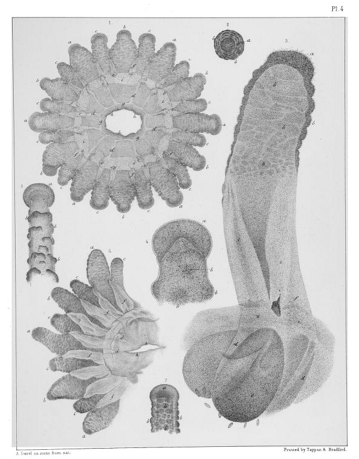
From: The Anatomy of Astrangia Danae, 1849

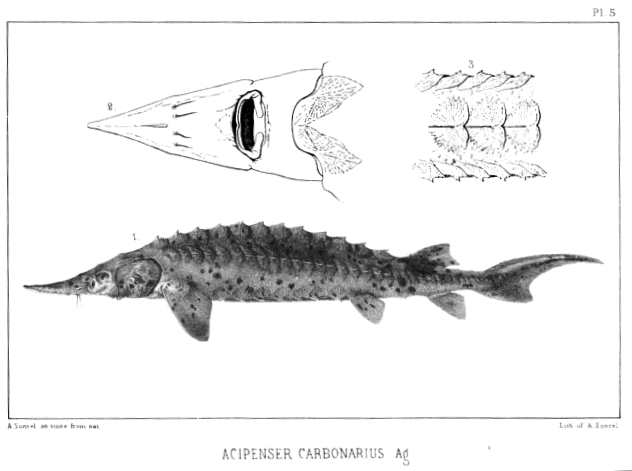
From: Lake Superior, 1850.

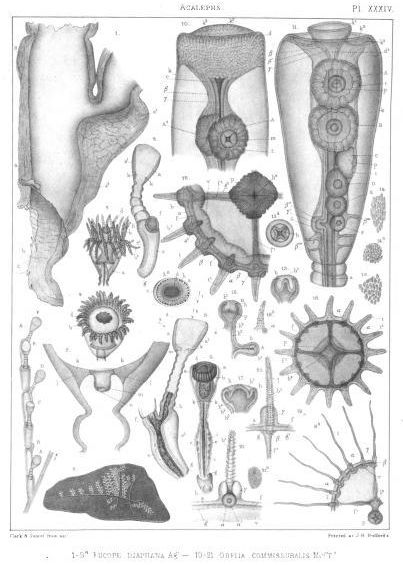
From: Louis Agassiz. Contributions to the Natural History of the United States of America, 1862.

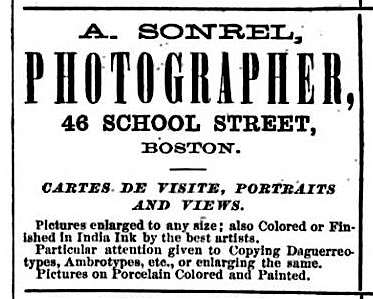
Advertisement for A. Sonrel, photographer, School Street, Boston, 1868

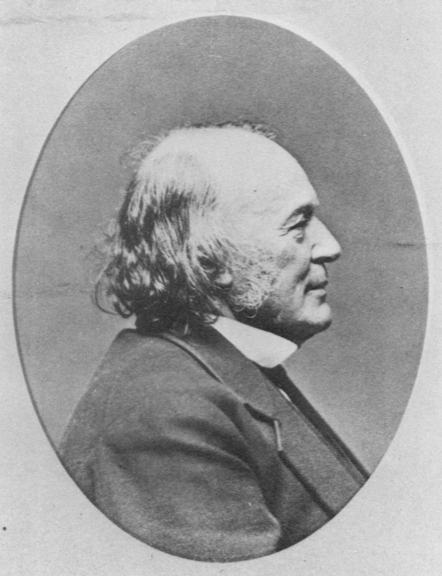
Portrait of Louis Agassiz, by Sonrel, 1872

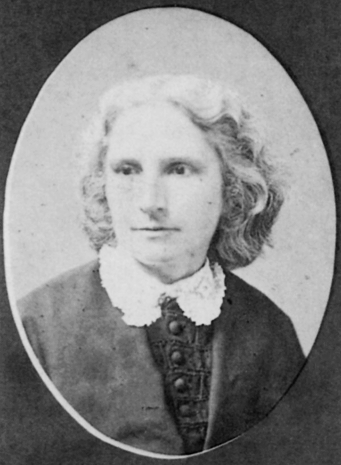
Portrait of Anne Whitney, 1874

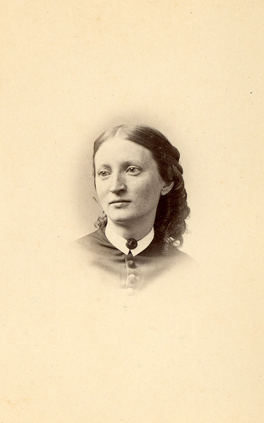
Portrait of an unidentified woman, 19th century

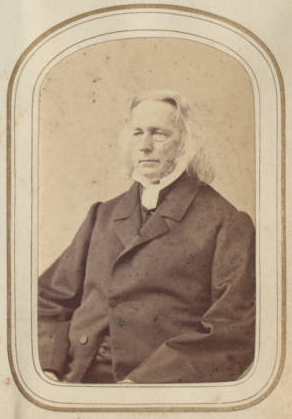
Portrait of Mr. Pettee, 19th century
