= American Society of Preventive Oncology =

Professional medical society

- Abbreviation: ASPO
- Type: Learned society
- Purpose: Cancer prevention
- Headquarters: Indianapolis, Indiana
- President: Anita Kinney, PhD, RN, FAAN, FABMR, Rutgers University
- Secretary/Treasurer: Allison Burton-Chase, PhD, To Life! Breast Cancer Education and Support Nonprofit
- President-Elect: Michael Scheurer, PhD, MPH, Baylor College of Medicine
- Executive Director: Billi Carson
- Website: aspo.org

The American Society of Preventive Oncology is a multidisciplinary professional society dedicated to cancer prevention and control research. It was established in 1976.

In 1992, the society established the Cullen Memorial Award, named after Joseph W. Cullen, which is given at each of their annual meetings to an individual who has made distinguished achievements in tobacco control. Ellen Gritz was the award's first recipient.

The society has nine special interest groups: Behavioral Science & Health Communication; Lifestyles Behavior, Energy Balance & Chemoprevention; Molecular Epidemiology & the Environment; Early Detection & Risk Prediction of Cancer; Cancer Health Equity; Survivorship & Health Outcomes; Early Career; Mid Career and Global Cancer Research. Since 2017 ASPO has hosted monthly webinars led by the special interest groups.

The society has held an annual scientific conference for 48 years. The 44th and 45th of these conferences were held virtually in response to the Covid-19 pandemic. In-person conferences resumed in 2022. Conferences are held in April and supported by a National Institute of Health R13 grant.
