= Richard Clarke (merchant) =

American merchant (1711–1795)

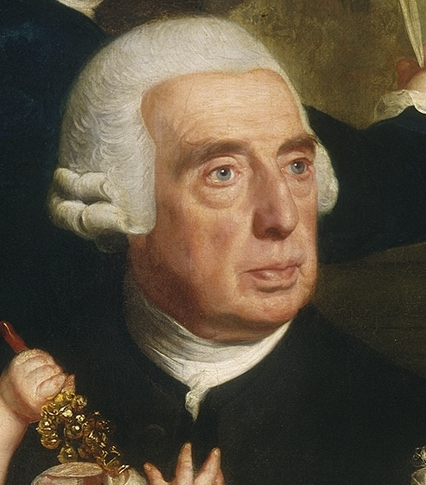
- from The Copley Family by John Singleton Copley
- Born: May 1, 1711
- Died: February 27, 1795
- Spouse: Elizabeth Winslow

Richard Clarke (May 1, 1711 – February 27, 1795) was a prominent Boston merchant and Loyalist in the late eighteenth century. His company, Richard Clarke & Sons, was chosen as factors for the British East India Company and were among the consignees of the tea which was thrown into Boston Harbor on December 16, 1773, as part of the Boston Tea Party.

== Biography ==
Clarke was the son of William and Hannah (Appleton) Clarke of Boston, where he was born.

On May 3, 1733, he married Elizabeth Winslow, who has been variously said to be the daughter of Edmund, Isaac, and Col. Edward Winslow. It is probable that she was the daughter of Edward Winslow and Elizabeth his wife, whose birth of February 16, 1712, is listed in the Boston records. Both Richard Clarke and his wife were of distinguished ancestry and occupied a high social position.

Richard graduated from Harvard College in 1729 and became one of the most prominent merchants in Boston, his firm at the time of the American Revolution including his two sons, Jonathan and Isaac, under the name of Richard Clarke & Sons.

The family had become extremely unpopular with the Whigs. On one occasion, Isaac went to Plymouth to collect some debts and was attacked and forced to make a midnight escape. Susannah Farnum Clarke, one of Richard's four daughters, married the artist John Singleton Copley in 1769 and went to live with him in London. In view of the growing difficulties in Boston and after the Boston Tea Party, Clarke also decided to go to England. After a remarkable voyage of only twenty-one days, he landed there on December 24, 1775, and lived at Copley's house until his death in 1795, at the age of 83. With one of his sons he joined the Loyalist Club of London. The family was on the American proscription lists, but in his will Clarke disposed of considerable property, including Bank of England stock and American securities.

== Boston Tea Party ==
Jonathan was in London in 1773 and Richard Clarke & Sons were named as factors for the Honourable East India Company and were among the consignees of the tea which was thrown into Boston Harbor in December of that year, in the Boston Tea Party. On November 2, they had received a letter signed "O. C.," ordering them to appear at the Liberty Tree the following Wednesday at noon to make a public resignation of their commission as factors.

On Wednesday morning some of the other consignees, including Thomas Hutchinson Jr. (son of the governor), Benjamin Faneuil (the brother of Peter Faneuil), and Joshua Winslow, met the Clarkes at their warehouse on King Street. A mob of about five hundred had gathered at the Liberty Tree and, as the merchants did not appear, a considerable number gathered in front of the warehouse. Nine of them went in as emissaries to induce the merchants to yield, and, when they refused to do so, the mob attempted to storm the building but was repulsed. When Jonathan arrived from England there was a gathering of friends at the Clarkes' house in School Street to welcome him, which led to another attack by the mob. The Clarke firm at first refused to sign the Non-Importation Agreement, but afterward consented. Richard Clarke was also one of the signers of the Address to General Thomas Gage.

== General and cited references ==
- "Richard Clarke". Dictionary of American Biography. American Council of Learned Societies, 1928–1936.
