= Sverdlin =

Sverdlin, feminine: Sverdlina is a Russian-language toponymic surname of Jewish origin derived from places named Sverdly/Sviardly, in Vitebsk region, Belarus. Notable people with the surname include:

- Grigory Sverdlin
- Lev Sverdlin

== See also ==
- Sverdlov, a surname of similar etymology
