= Pain ladder =

Guideline for the use of drugs in the management of pain

"Pain ladder", or analgesic ladder, was created by the World Health Organization (WHO) as a guideline for the use of drugs in the management of pain. Originally published in 1986 for the management of cancer pain, it is now widely used by medical professionals for the management of all types of pain.

The general principle is to start with first step drugs, and then to climb the ladder if pain is still present. The medications range from common, over-the-counter drugs at the lowest rung, to strong opioids.

== The ladder ==
The WHO guidelines recommend prompt oral administration of drugs ("by the mouth") when pain occurs, starting, if the patient is not in severe pain, with non-opioid drugs such as paracetamol (acetaminophen) or aspirin, with or without "adjuvants" such as non-steroidal anti-inflammatory drugs (NSAIDs) including COX-2 inhibitors. Then, if complete pain relief is not achieved or disease progression necessitates more aggressive treatment, a weak opioid such as codeine, dihydrocodeine or tramadol is added to the existing non-opioid regime. If this is or becomes insufficient, a weak opioid is replaced by a strong opioid, such as morphine, diamorphine, fentanyl, buprenorphine, oxymorphone, oxycodone, or hydromorphone, while continuing the non-opioid therapy, escalating opioid dose until the patient is pain free or at the maximum possible relief without intolerable side effects. If the initial presentation is severe pain, this stepping process should be skipped and a strong opioid should be started immediately in combination with a non-opioid analgesic.

The guideline directs that medications should be given at regular intervals ("by the clock") so that continuous pain relief occurs, and ("by the individual") dosing by actual relief of pain rather than fixed dosing guidelines. It recognizes that breakthrough pain may occur and directs immediate rescue doses be provided.

WHO Pain Ladder
Step 1.	Mild pain:			Non-opioid	+	Optional adjuvant	If pain persists or increases, go to step 2.
Step 2.	Moderate pain:	Weak opioid	+	Non-opioid	+	Optional adjuvant	If pain persists or increases, go to step 3.
Step 3.	Severe pain:	Strong opioid	+	Non-opioid	+	Optional adjuvant	Freedom from pain.

The usefulness of the second step (weak opioid) is being debated in the clinical and research communities. Some authors challenge the pharmacological validity of the step and, pointing to their higher toxicity and low efficacy, argue that a weak opioid, with the possible exception of tramadol due to its unique additional actions (see tramadol § Pharmacology), could be replaced by smaller doses of a strong opioid.

Not all pain yields completely to classic analgesics, and drugs that are not traditionally considered analgesics, but which reduce pain in some cases, such as steroids or bisphosphonates, may be employed concurrently with analgesics at any stage. Tricyclic antidepressants, class I antiarrhythmics, or anticonvulsants are the drugs of choice for neuropathic pain. Up to 90 percent of cancer patients, immediately preceding death, use such adjuvants. Many adjuvants carry a significant risk of serious complications.

== History ==
The ladder was developed by a team that included Jan Stjernswärd and Mark Swerdlow.

== See also ==
- Opioid comparison, an example of an equianalgesic chart
- Pain management

== Bibliography ==
- Schug, Stephan A; Auret, Kirsten (26 September 2008). Clinical pharmacology: principles of analgesic drug management. CRC Press. pp. 103–122. ISBN 9780340940075., in Sykes et al (2008)
- Sykes, Nigel; Bennet, Michael; Yuan, Chun-su, eds. (2008). Clinical Pain Management: Cancer Pain. CRC Press. ISBN 978-0-340-94007-5.
- Cancer-Related Pain Management. Cancer Care Ontario. 2012.

The pain ladder has appeared in several publications.

The original 1986 presentation of the pain ladder is on page 51 of this booklet.

- World Health Organization (1986). Cancer pain relief (PDF) (1 ed.). Geneva: World Health Organization. ISBN 9241561009.

Later presentations are in updated publications.

- World Health Organization (1996). Cancer pain relief. With a guide to opioid availability (2 ed.). Geneva: WHO. ISBN 92-4-154482-1.
- World Health Organization (1998). Cancer pain relief and palliative care in children. Geneva: WHO. ISBN 978-92-4-154512-9.
- "WHO's cancer pain ladder for adults". Cancer. WHO. 2017. Archived from the original on August 7, 2003.
