= Joseph W. Cullen =

American cancer researcher

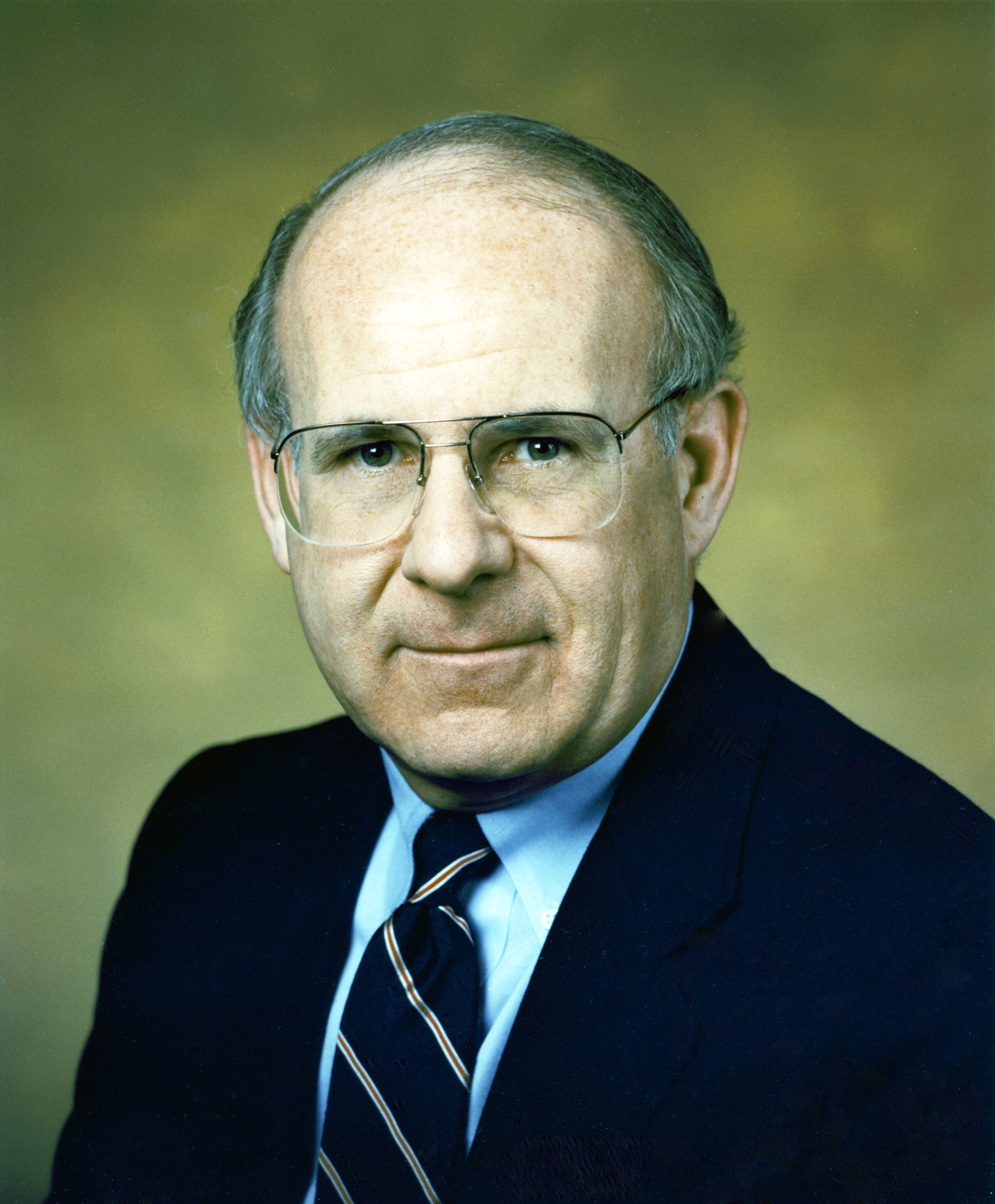
- 1988 portrait of Cullen, National Cancer Institute
- Born: 28 November 1936; Boston, Massachusetts, U.S.
- Died: 24 November 1990 (aged 53); San Francisco, California, U.S.
- Cause of death: Brain cancer
- Education: Boston College (BS, MA); Florida State University (PhD)
- Known for: Smoking Tobacco and Cancer Program at NCI (1982)
- Spouse: Katherine Marie Cullen
- Children: 2
- Scientific career
- Fields: Cancer prevention and rehabilitation
- Workplaces: Perry Point VA Hospital; National Institutes of Health; National Cancer Institute; Jonsson Comprehensive Cancer Center; AMC Cancer Center

Joseph W. Cullen (November 28, 1936 – November 24, 1990) was an American cancer prevention and rehabilitation researcher and briefly director of the AMC Cancer Research Center (1989-1990). He previously worked at the VA Hospital in Maryland (1968-1973), the National Institutes of Health (1973), the National Cancer Institute (NCI) (1974-1976, 1982–1989), and the Jonsson Comprehensive Cancer Center (1976-1982), holding high-level positions such as division director at several. He was a coordinator, creator, and researcher for the Smoking Tobacco and Cancer Program at the NCI, the largest anti-smoking campaign in the world at that time. Cullen wrote more than 90 publications in his lifetime, including four books.

== Early life and education ==
Cullen was born in Boston, Massachusetts, on November 28, 1936. He graduated from Boston Latin School in 1954 before earning a BS (1961) and MA (1965) degree in experimental and clinical psychology from Boston College. In 1968, he finished his PhD in physiological psychology from Florida State University. While working on his doctorate in 1964–1966, he worked as an instructor at Florida State, Wrentham State School, and Dean College. He was a Quimet Scholar and a PBS predoctoral fellow, and participated in a National Science Foundation Summer Research Program.

== Career ==
After graduating with his PhD in 1968, he worked at the Pavlovian Research Laboratory at the VA Hospital in Perry Point, Maryland, first as a research associate, and later as a research psychologist. He was also a lecturer at the University of Maryland and an assistant professor of psychiatry at the University of Maryland School of Medicine at this time. Starting in 1971, he was Chief of the Behavioral Nutrition Laboratory in Perry Point. He left this role in 1973 to join the National Institutes of Health as a grants associate in the research grants division. The following year, he became the Head of Review Activities for Treatment and Rehabilitation in the National Cancer Institute's (NCI) Cancer Control Program. In 1975 and 1976, he was Program Director of the NCI's behavioral programs within the Cancer Control and Rehabilitation division. He departed in 1976 and joined the Jonsson Comprehensive Cancer Center at the University of California, Los Angeles (UCLA) as the first director of the Division of Cancer Control. At this time, he also oversaw programs in behavioral medicine, educational research and evaluation, career development and communications; was chairman of the NCI's Smoking, Cancer, and Health program; and co-chairman of the Department of Health and Human Services' Intergovernmental Smoking Program.

In 1982, he returned to the NCI in Bethesda, Maryland as the deputy director of the Cancer Prevention and Control division. He and division director Peter Greenwald established a new approach to cancer control, which Cullen used as a model for the Smoking Tobacco and Cancer Program (STCP) he created in 1982. This framework was used to approach cancer by ascribing research stages for the first time. They made cancer prevention a research topic of its own right. Cullen was the creator and coordinator of the comprehensive Smoking, Tobacco and Cancer Program (STCP) at the NCI in 1982 to test a variety of cancer interventions. Significant amounts of money were poured into STCP to make it the largest program of its kind in the world; it was planned to leave the research stage and enter the public health sphere in 1991. In 1984, he was appointed as head of a panel by Surgeon General C. Everett Koop about the dangers of snuff. This project was called the Americans Stop Smoking Intervention Study (ASSIST), named as such after Koop challenged Americans to make the United States a smokeless society by the year 2000.

In May 1989, he was appointed director of the AMC Cancer Center in Denver, Colorado and was a clinical professor at the nearby University of Colorado School of Medicine, roles he held until his death in November 1990.

=== Related activities and awards ===
During his time at UCLA (1976-1982), he was editor of five different scientific journals; in 1984, he was associate editor of the Journal of the National Cancer Institute Monograph. He also designed the Preventative Medicine curricula at UCLA. In 1987, he was awarded the Surgeon General's Medallion for his work on the ASSIST program under Surgeon General Koop and in 1988 was named a Grads Made Good honoree by Florida State University. He was also awarded the American Cancer Society's (ACS) Order of the Golden Sword for his work on STCP campaigns. He was active in both the ACS and with the American Society of Preventative Oncology (ASPO).

== Personal life ==
On November 21, 1990, while on vacation in San Francisco, doctors discovered a malignant brain tumor. Cullen died at St. Luke's Hospital just three days later from brain cancer. At the times of his death, he lived in Englewood, Colorado with his wife Katherine. He was also survived by a son, Neil (or Neal) of State College, Pennsylvania; a daughter, Jennifer of Berkeley, California; and a brother Richard and a sister Joan of New York.

== Legacy ==
In 1992, the first Joseph W. Cullen Memorial Award was awarded by ASPO to Ellen Gritz, one of Cullen's mentees from UCLA. This award recognizes "distinguished achievement in continued national tobacco control efforts through research; the development of prevention and cessation programs with a wide-reaching public health impact; or public policy and advocacy initiatives." Other recipients of this prize include Jonathan Samet (2002), Caryn Lerman (2004), Stanton Glantz (2005), Michael Thun (2007), Ronald Davis (posthumously) (2009), Stephen Hecht (2012), and K. "Vish" Viswanath (2014).

In 1993, the Joseph W. Cullen Award was given to Emily Untermeyer from the Texas Cancer Council by the Association of State and Territorial Chronic Disease Program Directors and the CDC for her contributions to chronic disease prevention and control.

In 1994, the first Joseph W. Cullen Prevention/Early Detection Award was given to former Surgeon General Jesse Leonard Steinfeld by the International Association for the Study of Lung Cancer (IASLC). This award recognizes distinguished scientists working towards prevention research of thoracic malignancies. Nise Yamaguchi and Fadlo R. Khuri received the prize in 2018 and Denise Aberle did so in 2019.

The National Association of Chronic Disease Directors has an annual Joseph W. Cullen Excellence Award that recognizes "an individual outside the traditional public health field who has made outstanding contributions in the field of chronic disease." Past awardees include Courtney Atkins (2012) of Whole Child Leon for her work in establishing pre-K wellness and nutrition initiatives to decrease childhood obesity; and Kathleen Nolan (2014) of the National Association of Medicaid Directors for her work on the Affordable Care Act and Medicaid sustainability.
