= Ellen R. Gritz =

American psychologist and cancer researcher

- Born: April 9, 1944 (age 82); Washington Heights, New York, U.S.
- Education: Barnard College; University of California, San Diego
- Medical career
- Field: Behavioral Sciences
- Institutions: UCLA Jonsson Comprehensive Cancer Center; The University of Texas M. D. Anderson Cancer Center

Ellen R. Gritz (born April 9, 1944) is an American psychologist and cancer researcher. She is Professor and Chair Emerita of the Department of Behavioral Science and Olla S. Stribling Distinguished Chair for Cancer Research at The University of Texas M. D. Anderson Cancer Center.

== Biography ==
Gritz was born on April 9, 1944, in Washington Heights, Manhattan. She attended Bronx High School of Science and received her B.A. from Barnard College in 1964. After graduating from Barnard, she worked as a research assistant at Bell Labs. She then earned her Ph.D. from the University of California, San Diego, where her dissertation focused on memory mechanisms of animals. Her research has focused on the study of cigarette smoking behavior, smoking cessation, as well as the role of psychology in the prevention and treatment of cancer.

Gritz was a professor at UCLA Jonsson Comprehensive Cancer Center before moving to the University of Texas MD Anderson Cancer Center in 1993 and held the founding Chair of the Department of Behavioral Science for 21 years until her retirement in 2014.

In 2007, Gritz was elected a member of the National Academy of Medicine. She was a president of the Society for Research on Nicotine and Tobacco in 2006-2007, and president of the American Society of Preventive Oncology in 1993-1995.
