= Jan Stjernswärd =

Professor Jan Stjernswärd PhD, FRCP(Edin)
- Born: 1936 (age 89–90)
- Education: Karolinska Institute
- Occupation: Oncologist
- Employers: Karolinska Institute; World Health Organization

Professor Jan Stjernswärd PhD, FRCP(Edin) (born 1936) is an oncologist, specialising in palliative care.

Stjernswärd obtained a medical degree at the Karolinska Institute, and subsequently worked there as an assistant professor in tumour biology and as a specialist in radiotherapy and oncology.

From 1980 to 1986, he worked for the World Health Organization, as their head of cancer. While in that role he instigated development of the 'WHO Three-Step Pain Ladder' and worked to improve cancer care globally.
