= Joe Cullen =

Joe Cullen may refer to:

- Joe Cullen (American football) (born 1967), defensive line coach
- Joe Cullen (darts player) (born 1989), English darts player

== See also ==
- Joseph Cullen (disambiguation)
