= Sverdlov (surname) =

Sverdlov (Свердлов, feminine: Sverdlova) is a primarily Jewish toponymic surname from the places named Sverdly/Sviardly, in Vitebsk region, Belarus. Notable people with the surname include:

- Abram Sverdlov (1912–1991), Soviet naval officer
- Anastasya Sverdlova (born 1989), Ukrainian soccer player
- Andrei Sverdlov (1911–1969), Soviet police officer
- Arkady Vladimirovich Sverdlov (1906–1979), Soviet naval officer
- Borukh Hertsevych Sverdlov (1914–1972), Ukrainian Soviet artist
- Denis Sverdlov (born 1978), British-based Russian businessman
- F. D. Sverdlov (1921–2002), Soviet military historian
- G. M. Sverdlov (1898–1965), Soviet jurist
- Lazar Matveevich Sverdlov (1926–1986), Russian physicist
- Marksėn Gaukhman-Sverdlov (1929–1997), Russian artist
- Mikhail Sverdlov (1939–2022), Russian historian
- Mikhail Igorevich Sverdlov (born 1966), Russian literary critic
- Rephael Sverdlov (1885–1965), Russian-Israeli politician
- Roza Sverdlova (1908–2003), Russian actress
- Saul Markovich Sverdlov (1902–1938), Soviet statesman
- Vladimir Sverdlov-Ashkenazy (born 1976), Russian pianist and composer
- Yakov Sverdlov (1885–1919), Russian revolutionary and Soviet politician
- Yaroslav Sverdlov (born 1968), Belarusian soccer player
- Veniamin Sverdlov (1886–1939), Soviet statesman
- Yevgeny Sverdlov (born 1938), Russian biochemist
- Yuri Sverdlov (1925–2007), Russian Soviet scientist
- Yury Sverdlov (born 1972), Russian politician
- Zinovy Peshkov (1884–1966), Russian-born French general and diplomat

== See also ==
- Sverdlin, a surname of similar etymology
