= Kasisomayajula Viswanath =

American scientist

Kasisomayajula Viswanath, nicknamed “Vish,” is an American scientist, currently the Lee Kum Kee Professor of Health Communication at Harvard T.H. Chan School of Public Health (HSPH), as well as in the McGraw-Patterson Center for Population Sciences at the Dana-Farber Cancer Institute (DFCI). At HSPH, he directs both the Lee Kum Sheung Center for Health and Happiness and the India Research Center. At DFCI, he leads the Viswanath Lab. Within the Harvard Cancer Consortium (HCC), he serves as Faculty Director of the Health Communication Core, founding Director of the Enhancing Communications for Health Outcomes (ECHO) Laboratory, and Associate Director of Community Outreach and Engagement. Dr. Viswanath received his PhD from the University of Minnesota in 1990.

Dr. Viswanath’s research agenda is grounded in two core commitments. The first is to place equity at the center of translational communication science in order to advance health and well-being across all population groups. The second is to partner with community-based organizations and other stakeholders through participatory research that supports meaningful social change. Through his lab’s research program, he seeks to inform and improve public health policy and practice by advancing knowledge translation and translational communication. His scholarship draws on communication science, social epidemiology, dissemination and implementation research, and the social and health behavior sciences.

Over the course of his career, Dr. Viswanath has examined how communication inequalities intersect with poverty, health disparities, and knowledge translation efforts aimed at reducing inequities in health. He has published more than 340 journal articles and book chapters on communication inequalities and health disparities, knowledge translation, public health communication campaigns, e-health and the digital divide, public health emergency preparedness, and communication interventions designed for underserved populations. He has also co-edited seven books and monographs, which are listed below.

Dr. Viswanath has contributed his expertise to numerous national committees, including groups convened by the U.S. Department of Health and Human Services (HHS), the Centers for Disease Control and Prevention (CDC), and the National Academy of Sciences, Engineering, and Medicine (NASEM). He also chaired NASEM’s Consensus Study Committee on Understanding and Addressing Misinformation About Science.

Among his many honors, Dr. Viswanath’s four most recent recognitions are election as a member of the National Academy of Medicine in 2026, the American Association for the Advancement of Science in 2024, the College of Liberal Arts Alumnus of Notable Achievement honor from the University of Minnesota in 2018, and the Post Graduate Mentor of the Year award from Dana-Farber Cancer Institute in 2017. In addition, he has received several other awards and fellowships recognizing his contributions to health communication, mentoring, tobacco research, public health, behavioral medicine, and public opinion research.

== Books and monographs ==
- Glanz, K., Rimer, B. K., & Viswanath, K. (Eds.). (2024). Health behavior: Theory, research, and practice (6th ed.). Wiley.
- Viswanath, K., Taylor, T. E., & Rhodes, H. G. (Eds.). (2024). Understanding and addressing misinformation about science. National Academies Press.
- Viswanath, K., Awasthi, A., Pinnamaneni, R., Dhawan, D., Kumar, A., & Poddar, M. A. (2021). The first 1000 days of life: Lessons from social and behavior change communication. Ministry of Women and Child Development, Government of India.
- National Cancer Institute. (2017). A socioecological approach to addressing tobacco-related health disparities (Tobacco Control Monograph No. 22). U.S. Department of Health and Human Services. [K. Viswanath, Section Editor]
- National Cancer Institute. (2008). The role of media in promoting and reducing tobacco use (Tobacco Control Monograph No. 19). U.S. Department of Health and Human Services. [K. Viswanath, Editor]
- Donsbach, W. (Ed.). (2008). The international encyclopedia of communication. Wiley-Blackwell. [K. Viswanath, Area Editor for Communication and Social/Behavioral Change]
- Viswanath, K., & Demers, D. P. (Eds.). (1999). Mass media, social control, and social change: A macrosocial perspective. Iowa State University Press.
