= Robert F. McDermott =

US Air Force general

Robert Francis McDermott
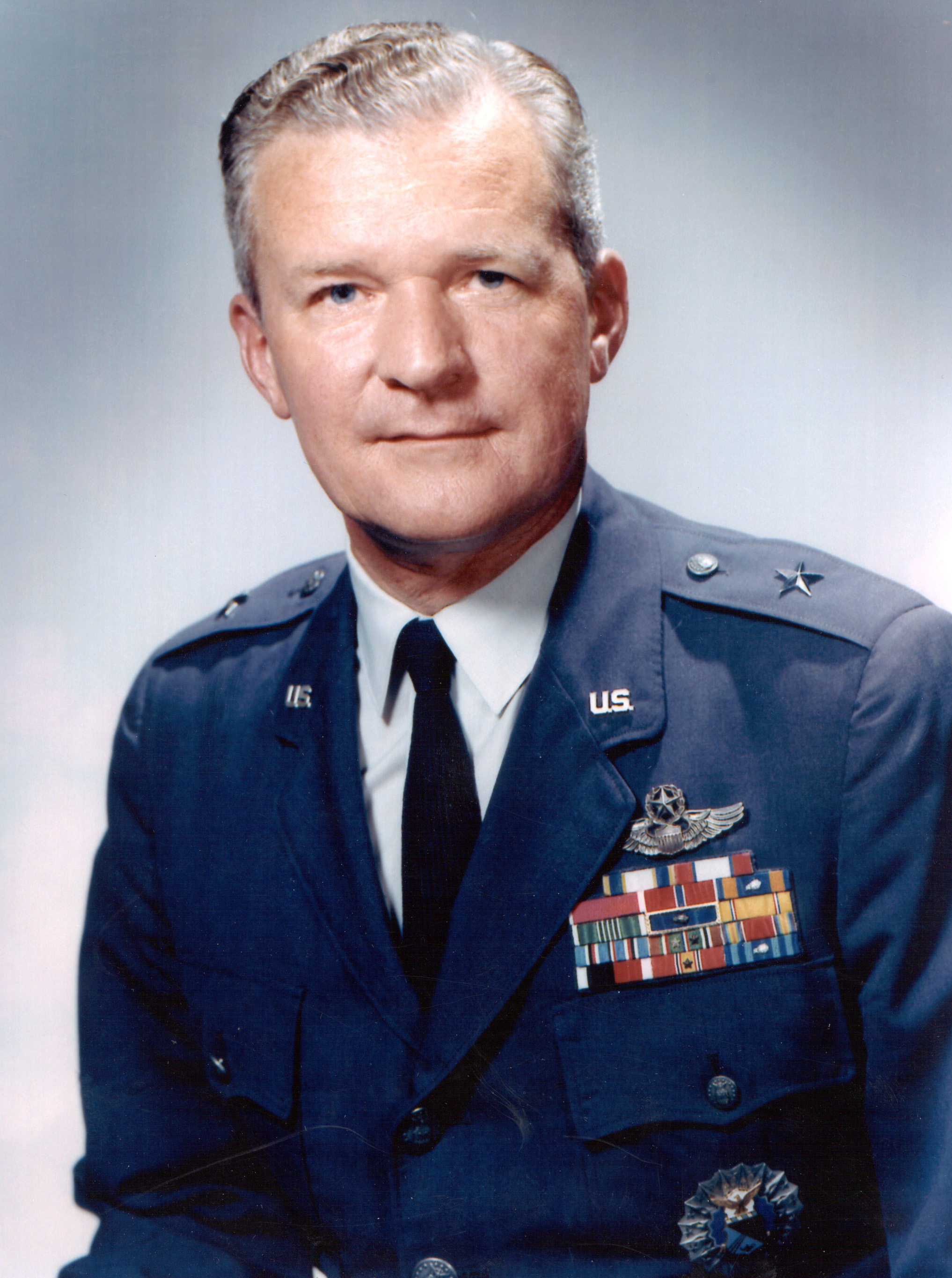
- Air Force portrait of Brigadier General Robert F. McDermott
- Born: July 31, 1920; Boston, Massachusetts
- Died: August 28, 2006 (aged 86); San Antonio, Texas
- Military career
- Allegiance: United States of America
- Branch: United States Air Force
- Service years: 1943-1968
- Rank: Brigadier General
- Conflicts: World War II
- Awards: Army Distinguished Service Medal; Air Force Distinguished Service Medal; Legion of Merit; Bronze Star; Air Medal (6)
- Other work: Chairman, CEO of USAA

Robert Francis McDermott (July 31, 1920 – August 28, 2006) was the first permanent dean of the Faculty at the United States Air Force Academy, and later was chairman and CEO of USAA. He is often referred to as the "Father of Modern Military Education" for his contributions to that field.

== Education ==
McDermott graduated from the Boston Latin School, attended Norwich University, and in 1943, graduated from the United States Military Academy. In 1950, he earned a master of business administration degree from Harvard Business School, and later earned a doctor of laws degree from St. Louis University.

== Air Force Career ==
General McDermott served as a combat pilot and operations officer of a fighter-bomber group in the European Theater during World War II and as a staff officer in a theater headquarters and in the Pentagon. His combat decorations include the Bronze Star and the Air Medal with five oak leaf clusters; he also was the recipient of the Distinguished Service Medal (Army and Air Force), and the Legion of Merit.

He was appointed by President Eisenhower as the first permanent professor of the United States Air Force Academy in 1957, and as the first permanent Dean of the Faculty in 1959. His promotion to brigadier general that accompanied his appointment as dean made him the youngest general or flag officer on active duty at that time.

General McDermott has emerged as a recognized leader in higher education and pioneer in military education. The innovations he introduced in the service academy system of education included the "whole person" concept in selecting cadets and a program of advanced and elective courses to enrich the prescribed curriculum. The concept of using measures of a candidate's moral and leadership attributes as well as physical and mental qualifications for selection was introduced in 1956, for the first time at any service academy.

Also in 1956, as another service academy first, General McDermott introduced a comprehensive curriculum enrichment program designed to provide each cadet with a challenge to advance academically as far and as fast as possible, in accordance with the cadet's aptitudes, interests and prior preparation. General McDermott laid the groundwork for the establishment of an Astronautical Research Laboratory and an extension of the enrichment program to include graduate education opportunities for exceptional cadets. He was credited with introducing about 30 academic majors to the Academy and bringing a degree of flexibility to curriculum requirements.

== Post-Air Force ==
McDermott wrote books on finance for service personnel, which attracted the attention of USAA president Charles Cheever and in 1968, McDermott retired from the Air Force to join USAA and become its chief executive officer. Under his leadership, USAA grew from the 16th to the 5th largest insurer of private automobiles in the nation and the nation's 4th largest homeowner insurer. A Washington Post obituary explained:

Within the company, he was a leading force for minority hiring and equalizing wages. He established four-day workweeks and made employee child care a feature to attract working mothers. "You don't lead by being authoritarian, he said....He had a reputation as a rare maverick in the insurance business, most notably advocating air bags as a crucial safety measure when auto manufacturers were saying it was too costly.

In September 1993 he assumed the position of chairman emeritus.

McDermott also played a significant role in the community of San Antonio, Texas. In 1974, he was elected chairman of the Greater San Antonio Chamber of Commerce. In 1975, he founded the Economic Development Foundation and was its chairman until 1980. In the 1980s, he focused on the developing of biotechnology in San Antonio, and founded the Texas Research and Technology Foundation which began development of the Texas Research Park. In the mid-1990s he was chairman of an investor group that purchased the San Antonio Spurs basketball team for $85 million.

== Awards and recognition ==
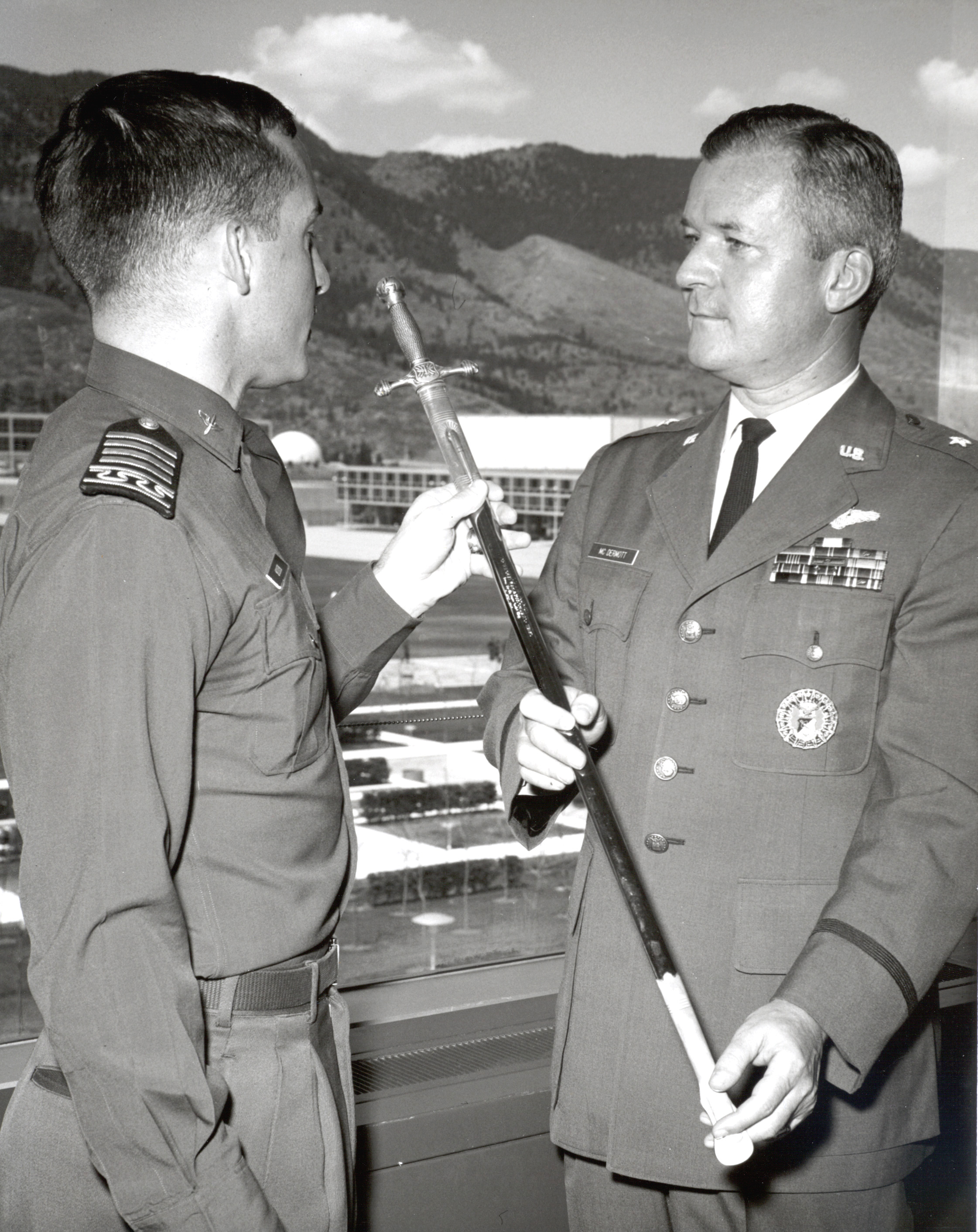
Brig. Gen. McDermott receives an inscribed sword from a cadet at the United States Air Force Academy.

Testaments to his lifelong interests in education include an elementary school and a Clinical Science Building at the University of Texas Health Science Center which bear his name. A grateful community designated a section of Interstate 10 in Texas running through San Antonio between I-35 outside of Downtown to Loop 1604 as the Robert F. McDermott Freeway in recognition of his many initiatives as a pioneer civic entrepreneur, both in education and economic development. Academic chairs in his honor have been established at the United States Air Force Academy and the United States Military Academy, and the library at the Air Force Academy also bears his name.

For his leadership in business, he was selected to the Texas Business Hall of Fame in 1987 and the American National Business Hall of Fame in 1989. In 1993, West Point selected him to receive its Distinguished Graduate Award. In 1994 Fortune selected him as Laureate in Junior Achievement's National Business Hall of Fame. In 1996, the International Insurance Society inducted him into the Insurance Hall of Fame. In 1998, he was awarded the Harvard Business School's highest honor, the Alumni Achievement Award, as a tribute to his accomplishments at the Air Force Academy and USAA. He received the Golden Plate Award from the American Academy of Achievement in June 1999. His Golden Plate was presented by Awards Council member General David C. Jones.

== Death ==
McDermott died on August 28, 2006, in San Antonio at the age of 86. He had suffered a stroke about a month earlier. General McDermott was eulogized by former Secretary of Housing and Urban Development Henry G. Cisneros at the funeral, and interred at Fort Sam Houston United States National Cemetery on September 1, 2006.
