= USAA =

American insurance and financial services company

United Services Automobile Association
- Formerly: United States Army Automobile Association (1922–1924)
- Type: Private (Reciprocal inter-insurance exchange)
- Industry: Financial services
- Founded: June 20, 1922; 104 years ago
- Headquarters: San Antonio, Texas, United States
- Number of locations: 5 financial centers
- Area served: Worldwide
- Key people: James M. Zortman (Chairman); Juan Andrade (President and CEO)
- Products: Banking; Financial planning; Insurance; Retirement
- Revenue: ▲US$42.49 billion (2023)
- Net income: ▲US$1.217 billion (2023)
- Total assets: ▲US$211.6 billion (2023)
- Total equity: ▲US$29.15 billion (2023)
- Members: ▲14.3 million (2025)
- Number of employees: c. 37,000 (2023)
- Capital ratio: 16.4% (Tier 1, Q2 2024)
- Rating: AM Best: A++; Moody's: Aa1; S&P: AA+
- Website: usaa.com

The United Services Automobile Association (USAA) is an American financial services company providing insurance, including personal property and casualty and life insurance, and banking products exclusively to members of the military, veterans and their families. It was founded in 1922 in San Antonio, Texas, by a group of 25 U.S. Army officers as a mechanism for mutual self-insurance, when they were unable to secure auto insurance due to insurer’s inability to accommodate their frequent relocations.

USAA is headquartered in northwest San Antonio. USAA Federal Savings Bank, which provides banking services and is one of the largest banks in the United States, is headquartered on a 575-acre (233 ha) campus in Phoenix, Arizona. USAA is ranked 93rd on the Fortune 500. USAA is a pioneer of the concept of direct marketing; most of its business is conducted over the Internet or telephone using employees instead of agents.

== History ==
The United Services Automobile Association was formed based on a meeting of 25 United States Army officers on June 20, 1922, at the Gunter Hotel in San Antonio, Texas, to discuss the procurement of reliable and economical auto insurance.

The organization was originally called the United States Army Automobile Association. In 1924, the name was changed to United Services Automobile Association, when commissioned officers of other U.S. military services became eligible for membership.

Despite initial success, by the late 1920s, a dispute between competing factions for control of the company threatened its long-term viability. The issue was resolved when feuding members agreed to hire a leader from outside, resulting in the 1928 appointment of Major General Ernest Hinds as general manager and secretary-treasurer. Hinds provided stability and remained in the position until his death in 1941.

Until the 1960s, the bulk of its business was conducted via mail. In the late 1960s, USAA began a transition from mail to phone-based sales and service. Retired Air Force brigadier general Robert F. McDermott became CEO in 1969. The USAA office building in San Antonio was constructed under his tenure, and McDermott was behind USAA's shift from service-by-mail to service-by-phone. USAA launched a toll-free number in 1978.

In 1993, retired Air Force General Robert T. Herres became CEO. Under Herres, USAA expanded its services to enlisted members of the military and developed Internet based financial services. USAA launched Internet sales and service in June 1999 via its website.

In 2000, Robert G. Davis, a former Army officer who came to USAA with experience in a variety of financial services companies became CEO. During his time at USAA, membership, assets and net worth grew significantly. Davis oversaw USAA's first layoffs and by some reports had a confrontational style of leadership. Davis retired abruptly in December 2007.

Beginning in 2009, USAA was one of the first banks to enable customers to deposit checks via mobile deposit. The company fought many legal battles to protect its patent claims on mobile checking deposit technology. USAA offered restricted membership to civilians between September 2009 and August 2013. This membership provided access to USAA's investment products, most bank deposit products and life insurance. Auto and property insurance policies were not included for non-military members due to eligibility restrictions. In 2019, USA sold its asset management company to Victory Capital. In May 2020, Charles Schwab Corporation acquired USAA's investment management and brokerage accounts for $1.8 billion. USAA named Wayne Peacock, the first USAA CEO who is not a veteran of the armed forces, as CEO effective February 2020 to succeed Stuart Parker. Effective April 2025, Juan C. Andrade became CEO.

== Membership requirements ==
USAA's mission statement indicates its focus to serve its niche market, which consists of members of the U.S. military and their immediate families. To that end, the association has always marketed directly to members of the U.S. military. USAA membership is offered to officers and enlisted personnel, including those on active duty, those in the National Guard and Reserve, Officer candidates in commissioning programs (Academy, ROTC, OCS/OTS) and all those who have served in the aforementioned categories and who have retired or have been discharged honorably.

Historically, only U.S. military officers (among certain other federally sworn officers) were eligible to join USAA, with descendants of USAA members able to purchase insurance from USAA-CIC. It did not matter if one was an active duty or retired officer; one could join at any time. In 1973, membership was opened to members of the National Guard and Reserves, and in 1996, eligibility was expanded to enlisted members of the armed services. As the number of persons who have served on active duty in an enlisted status in the U.S. Armed Forces is quite large, USAA chose to limit the establishment of eligibility to those who were currently on active duty or who had recently separated. The same time limit on establishment of eligibility was then applied to military officers. In 2008, USAA expanded membership eligibility to all military personnel and retirees, and all veterans who separated after 1996. For a short time, USAA also offered enrollment for federal law enforcement.

In November 2009, USAA expanded eligibility requirements to offer coverage to anyone who has ever served honorably in the US Military.

In 2022, USAA extended membership to those who have a general discharge from the military.

USAA also includes current and former employees from the following federal agencies:

- Defense Criminal Investigation Services (DCIS)
- Drug Enforcement Administration (DEA)
- Federal Bureau of Investigation (FBI)
- Naval Criminal Investigative Service (NCIS)
- Secret Service (SS)
- U.S. Air Force Office of Special Investigations (AFOSI)
- U.S. Army Criminal Investigation Command (ACIC)
- U.S. Department of State (DOS) - eligibility for USAA membership limited to Foreign Service Officers and certain Foreign Service Employees who are or were on permanent appointment.
- Merchant Marine Academy (USMMA) Staff and Faculty - eligibility for USAA membership limited to current staff and faculty holding a commission granted by the Marine Administration.

== Locations ==
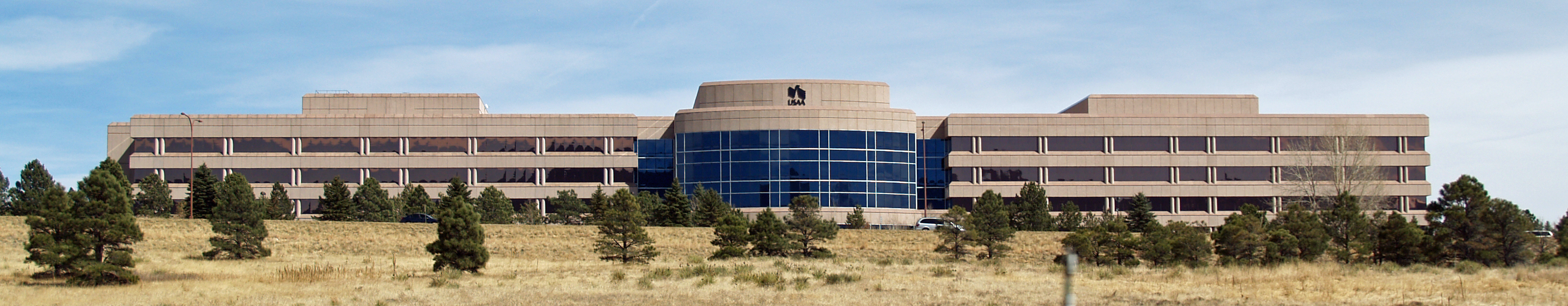
USAA's Colorado Springs location

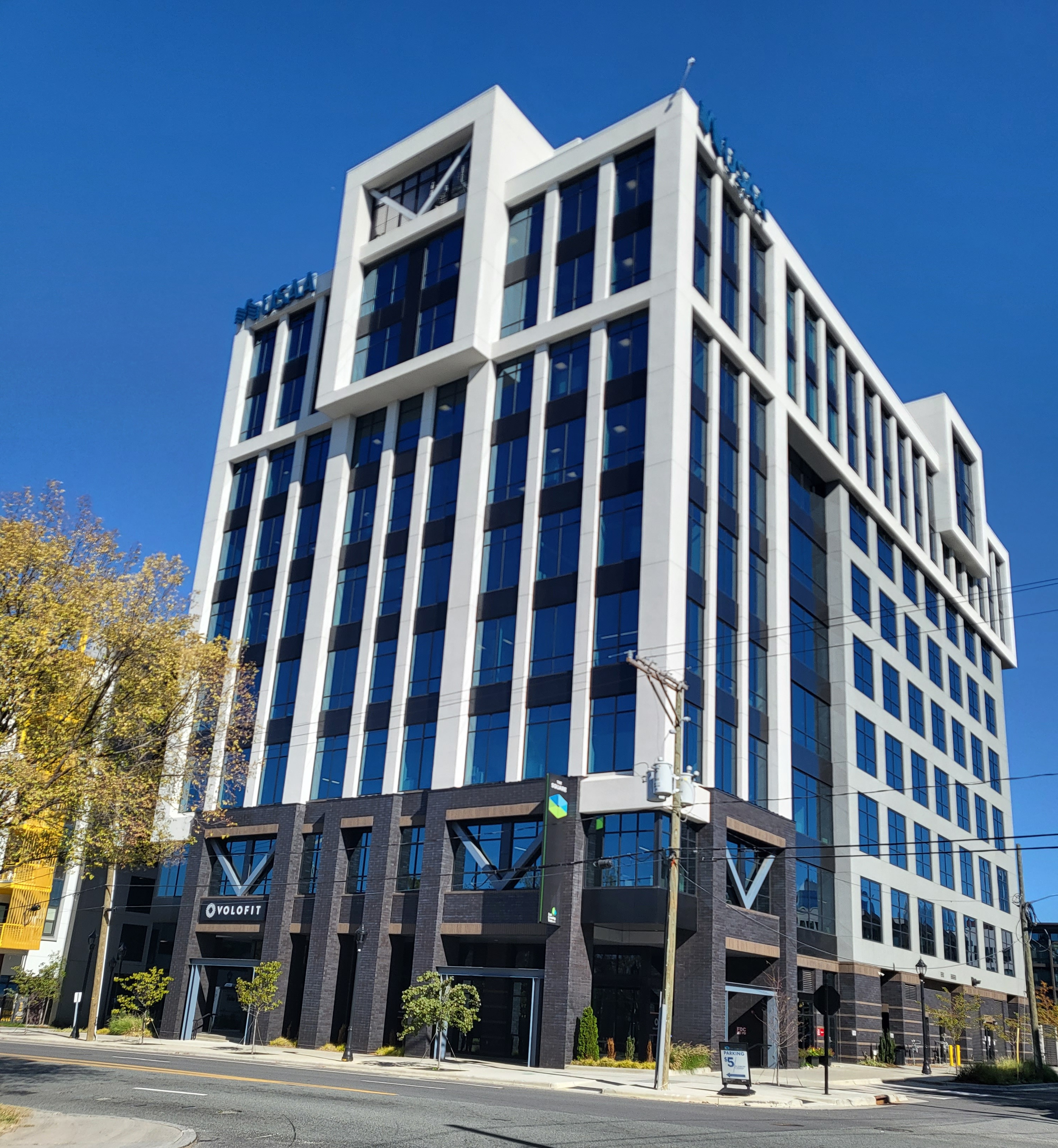
USAA's Charlotte, North Carolina South End location

Besides its headquarters in San Antonio, USAA has a second major office in Phoenix. USAA also has offices in Chesapeake, Virginia; Colorado Springs, Colorado; Plano, Texas; and Tampa, Florida. Internationally, USAA has offices in Dublin, London and Frankfurt. The company has numerous office buildings in the Phoenix area, most on a 400-acre multi-use north Phoenix campus built in 2017. These buildings contain 4,500 workers.

In May 2019, USAA opened another Phoenix office located at 25700 N Norterra Pkwy in north Phoenix to house 1,100 employees, primarily software developers.

In May 2021, USAA announced that it will be adding an additional 750 employees to its 100-employee base in Charlotte, North Carolina, leasing 90,000 square feet (8,400 m^{2}) of space in a new building in South End called The Square. Company employees started moving in at the end of 2021. In June 2022, USAA purchased The Square from developer Beacon Partners for $97 million.

== Sponsorships ==
USAA has been a sponsor of the Wounded Warrior Project since 2009.

Since 2011, USAA has sponsored the National Football League recognizing and honoring the military community. The partnership includes sponsoring the league's Salute to Service Award, presented annually at the NFL Honors.

In collegiate sports, USAA is a partner of all three United States service academies in NCAA Division I—the Air Force Falcons, Army Black Knights, and Navy Midshipmen. The company has been the Army–Navy Game's presenting sponsor since 2009, as part of a multi-year deal through 2030.

== Regulatory and legal actions ==
In March 2022, Financial Crimes Enforcement Network (FinCEN) announced a $140 million "civil money penalty" against USAA Federal Savings Bank for violations of the Bank Secrecy Act. In 2019, the OCC uncovered evidence of 600 violations of the Servicemembers Civil Relief Act and the Military Lending Act by USAA.

In August 2024, USAA paid $64.2 million to settle accusations that it breached the Servicemembers Civil Relief Act (SCRA) by charging illegal fees and excessive interest on loans.

In December 2024, the Office of the Comptroller of the Currency issued a cease and desist order Against USAA Federal Savings Bank to require the bank to correct a range of deficiencies related on unsafe or unsound practices relating to management, earnings, information technology, consumer compliance, and internal audit and suspicious activity reporting violations.

== See also ==
- List of largest banks in the United States
