= Mark Swerdlow =

British consultant anaesthetist

Dr. Mark Swerdlow FFARCS, DA
- Born: 1918
- Died: 26 February 2003
- Education: University of Manchester
- Occupation: Consultant anaesthetist
- Employer: Salford Royal Hospital

Dr. Mark Swerdlow FFARCS, DA (1918–2003) was a British consultant anaesthetist, said to have "created the speciality of pain medicine in Great Britain".

Swerdlow trained at the University of Manchester, and afterwards served in the Royal Army Medical Corps.

He developed his interest in pain management while working as a consultant anaesthetist at Salford Royal Hospital from 1951 to 1980.

He set up the North West Regional Pain Relief Centre, one of the UK's first, in 1959.

In 1971 he was elected chair of the Intractable Pain Society of Great Britain (later the Pain Society), which he had founded in 1967. He was subsequently made an honorary member.

After formally retiring, he worked as an advisor to the World Health Organization on the WHO analgesic ladder.

He died on 26 February 2003.

A collection of material relating to him is held by the University of Manchester Special Collections.
