= Vladimir Sverdlov-Ashkenazy =

Russian pianist and composer

- Born: Vladimir Leonidovich Sverdlov; July 21, 1976 (age 49); Moscow
- Occupation(s): pianist, composer
- Instrument: piano

Vladimir Leonidovich Sverdlov-Ashkenazy (Russian: Влади́мир Леони́дович Свéрдлов-Ашкена́зи; born on July 21, 1976, Moscow) is a Russian pianist and composer.

== Family ==
Vladimir Sverdlov comes from a family of musicians. His grandfather David Ashkenazy was a pianist, accompanist and composer, People's Artist of the USSR. His mother, Elena Ashkenazy, is a pianist and teaches piano at Musashino Academia Musicae in Tokyo. His uncle, Vladimir Ashkenazy, is a famous pianist and conductor.

== Education ==
Vladimir Sverdlov studied at the Central Music School at the Moscow Conservatory under Professor Vladimir Krainev. At the age of 14, in 1990, became the winner of the Moscow City Piano Competition. He continued his education at the Hannover Higher School of Music under Professor Arie Vardi.

== Career ==
At the age of 16, in 1992, Vladimir embarked on his first tour through Germany, accompanied by the Radio Frankfurt Orchestra conducted by Dmitry Kitayenko.

In 1993 Vladimir Sverdlov won the Grand Prix at the Citta di Senigallia International Competition in Italy.

In 1995 Vladimir made his Tel Aviv debut with the Israel Philharmonic Orchestra, performing Concerto No. 1 by Dmitri Shostakovich.

In 1997 Vladimir debuted with a solo recital at Tokyo's Suntory Hall.

In 1999 Vladimir was triumphant (Sixth Prize) at the Queen Elizabeth Competition in 1999 in Brussels. His performance has garnered him a great acclaim among the public and led to many professional engagements. After this the rapid rise of the pianist began. In 2000 Vladimir Sverdlov made his debut at the Great Hall of Concertgebouw. He performs regularly at important festivals including the Progetto Martha Argerich, collaborates with artists such as Mikhael Pletnev, Mischa Maisky, Martha Argerich and Alexander Vedernikov and performs internationally with major orchestras.

In 2006 Vladimir won the 14th International Monte-Carlo Piano Masters Competition. Critics noted his excellent technique and expressiveness.

In 2009 Vladimir Sverdlov first played several of his own compositions during his concert in Salle Gaveau in Paris.

In 2011 British music label "Piano classics" releases his album "Pictures at an Exhibition", which includes several Vladimir's own works. In the accompanying materials to the album he was named Vladimir Sverdlov-Ashkenazy for the first time, which is intended to symbolize his incarnation not only as a pianist, but also as a composer.

In 2013 Vladimir Sverdlov-Ashkenazy was granted the Manashir Yakubov Award "For Outstanding Mastery of Composing and Performing".

In April 2015 Vladimir Sverdlov-Ashkenazy took to the stage as a conductor, performing the Wolfgang Amadeus Mozart Concerto in D-moll k.466 with the Moscow Virtuosi Chamber Orchestra and the Svetlanov Hall of the Moscow International House of Music.

In March 2015 the composer presented the project "Reflection" in collaboration with theatre and film actor Georgy Taratorkin at the Small Hall of the Moscow Conservatory, in which Sverdlov-Ashkenazy played improvisations to Alexander's Blok poetry, which was named the high point of the Moscow cultural life in those days. In November 2015 Vladimir Sverdlov-Ashkenazy tried himself in the improvisation genre again, creating new pieces on the spot, and had success with the audience. The artist periodically returns to the genre of improvisation.

In 2019, Vladimir released his solo album "Vision Fugitive - Piano Creations", containing 15 original piano pieces. In the same year, his first video clip for the title composition of the album "Vision Fugitive" (Russian: Мимолётность) was released, where Vladimir is personally represented as an author, actor and pianist.

In 2021, Vladimir released his work Mystery (Russian: Тайна) on digital platforms, which can be called a requiem, since it is dedicated to the memory of a girl who died.

== Music ==
=== Discography ===
- Frédéric Chopin, Vladimir Sverdlov – "Piano Works"; CD, Cypres, 1999
- Modest Mussorgsky, Vladimir Sverdlov – "Modest Mussorgsky: Pictures at an Exhibition"; CD, Piano Classics, 2011
- Vladimir Sverdlov-Ashkenazy – "Vision Fugitive (Piano Creations)"; Digital, Pancher, 2019
- Vladimir Sverdlov-Ashkenazy – "Mystery"; Digital, Pancher, 2021

=== Video clips ===
Vision Fugitive — Pancher, 2019

=== Music for movies ===
- Sapsan, I Love You – Feature Film, 2012
- Good God! – Feature Film, 2012
- Birthday – Short Film, 2016.
- Girl with a Scythe – Feature Film, Epic Media, 2018
- Dina Rubina. On the Sunny Side – Documentary Film, AB-TV Production, 2019

=== Significant performances ===
- Prelude op. 9 for violin and piano, solo by Dmitry Kogan (violin) – performed at Festival de Menton, 2009
- Variations for Piano – performed at Festival de l'Athénée, Geneva, 2010
- Piano Sonata – performed at the Pianissimo Festival, Torredembarra, Spain, 2012
- Performance at the closing ceremony of the "Mirror" Film Festival named in honor of Andrei Tarkovsky, 2013
- "American Pictures", Fantasia for clarinet and piano – performed at the Chamber Hall of the Moscow International House of Music, 2013
- "Beautiful Mind", Septet – performed at the Chamber Hall of the Moscow International House of Music, 2014
- Burlesque – performed at the Seoul Arts Center, 2014
- Fantasy for piano and orchestra (in memory of David Ashkenazy) – performed at the Svetlanov Hall of the Moscow International House of Music, 2015
- Andante in Memory of Dmitry Kogan – performed at the Moscow Conservatory, 2018
- Romance, The Hope – both performed at The Organ Hall in Chisinau, 2018
- Ballade (in honor of Baron Arie Van Lysebeth) – performed at Flagey in Brussels, 2019
- Schumaniana (dedicated to Robert Schumann) – performed at the Wilhelm Kempf Academy in Positano, 2019

=== Sheet music publications ===
Fantasia op.11 for violin, viola and piano – Moscow Publishing House "Muzyka", 2010

== Social activities ==
Vladimir Sverdlov founded the Schwarzstein Arts Production Concert Association in Belgium and established the Chiba Festival (competition for young pianists in Japan) and the Moscow Art Center "Music With No Rules".
