= List of bells in Boston =

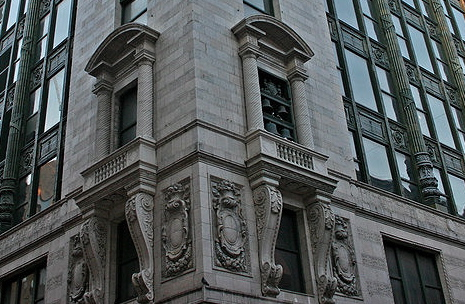
Bells in Filene's building, Downtown Crossing, Boston, 2008

This is a compilation of functioning bells in Boston, Massachusetts, located primarily in bell towers.

== List ==
- Church of the Advent
- Faneuil Hall. The bell was repaired in 2007 by spraying the frozen clapper with WD-40 over the course of a week and attaching a rope. Prior to this repair, the last known ringing of the bell with its clapper was at the end of World War II, in 1945, though it had since been rung several times by striking with a mallet.
- King's Chapel. The King's Chapel bell, cast in England, was hung in 1772. In 1814 it cracked, was recast by Paul Revere, and was rehung. It is the largest bell cast by the Revere foundry, and the last one cast by Paul Revere himself. It has been rung at services ever since.
- Lowell House bells. These bells are a replica set of the Danilov Monastery bells, which resided in the tower from 1930 to 2008. They consist of 3 large rhythm bells and 15 tuned melody bells that form a 2-octave white key scale. The bells are rung every Sunday at 1pm by the Lowell House Society of Russian Bell Ringers.
- Old North Church. Eight change ringing bells at Old North Church were cast in Gloucester, England in 1744 and hung in 1745. One bell has the inscription: We are the first ring of bells cast for the British Empire in North America, A.R. 1744.(Abel Rudhall, Bell Founder, Gloucester 1714–1760) The bells were restored in 1894 and in 1975. They are maintained and rung regularly by the Massachusetts Institute of Technology Guild of Bellringers.
- Old South Church
- Old South Meeting House Old South Meeting House now is home to a Paul Revere bell, cast in 1801. The bell was installed in 2011
- Arlington Street Church
- Park Street Church Whitechapel bell cast by Thomas Mears in 1819 for the church. Five bells cast and installed in 2021 by Meeks & Watson, Georgetown Ohio, tuned to match original bell. Prior to 2021, the Whitechapel bell had been silent for as much as a hundred years or more (per church records), other than occasional manual ringing with a mallet. All six bells are controlled electronically, and are equipped with both strikers and swinging motors. The new bells were pitched so as to chime the Westminster quarters, with the Whitechapel bell tolling the hour. The pitches are F#-A-B-D-E-F#.
- Cathedral of the Holy Cross Five bells cast in 1859 and 1860, moved from the former Holy Trinity Church, Shawmut Ave.
- Filene's building, Downtown Crossing. 4 small bells, which chime the Westminster quarters.
- The Mother Church (The First Church of Christ, Scientist). A chime of 18 bells installed 1984. Westminster quarters rung on D-E-A-B-C#

== See also ==
- Acoustic ecology
- Environmental noise
- Soundscape
