= Jonsson Comprehensive Cancer Center =

Cancer research center in Los Angeles, California

UCLA's Jonsson Comprehensive Cancer Center logo

The Jonsson Comprehensive Cancer Center (JCCC) is a cancer research center at University of California, Los Angeles.

== History ==
The center was originated by UCLA scientists and volunteers who began working together in the late 1960s. The center was formally established in 1974 and was designated as a comprehensive cancer center by the National Cancer Institute in 1976. The namesake of the center is the Jonsson family; entrepreneur and philanthropist Kenneth Alan Jonsson (the son of Texas Instruments co-founder J. Erik Jonsson), along with his wife Diana Gordon Jonsson, made a $1 million gift for UCLA in 1975 to establish the center, and continued to financially support the center over a period of decades.

Joseph W. Cullen served as a deputy director of the center.

== Organization, activities, and funding ==
The primary sponsor of the center is the Jonsson Cancer Center Foundation (JCCF), a 501(c)(3) entity (established in 1945).

The center employs over 500 physicians and scientists, who engage in clinical activities (i.e., cancer treatment), education, research (basic and clinical), and cancer prevention.

Although based at UCLA, the center has clinics elsewhere in California, in Westwood, Santa Monica, Alhambra, Irvine, Pasadena, Porter Ranch, Santa Clarita, and Simi Valley.

The center is known for its research on breast and ovarian cancer. JCCC scientists developed palbociclib (PD 0332991), a breast-cancer drug that was in phase III clinical trials as of 2015. JCCC scientists also identified IGF-1 as a pathway as one pathway for the growth of tumors.

In 2013, U.S. News & World Report ranked JCCC as #11 nationally among cancer centers. In 2015, the center ranked #6.

In 2023, U.S. News & World Report ranked JCCC #4 nationally and #1 in California among cancer centers.
