= Martin Dain =

American photographer

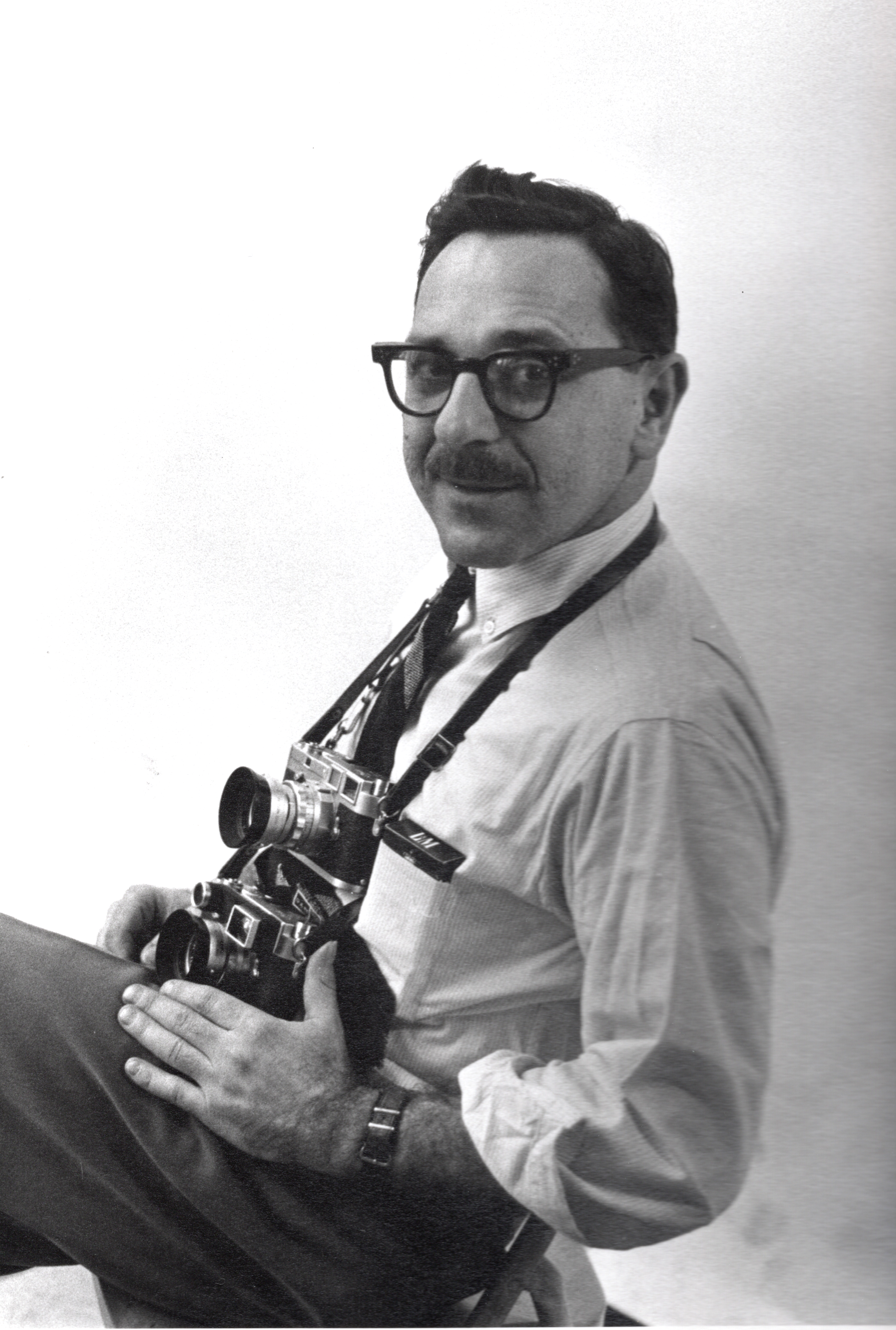
Martin J. Dain (photograph by Charles Harbutt, courtesy of the Dain family)

Martin Joseph Dain (September 20, 1924 – February 16, 2000) was an American photographer and photojournalist, known best for his photographs of the author William Faulkner. Dain studied photography in Paris, before returning to the United States where he worked as a freelance photographer for major publications including The New York Times and Time Magazine. Dain photographed a wide range of subjects and published 4 books. His photographs are held in collections at the University of Mississippi and the University of Texas at Austin.

== Early life and education ==
Dain was born in Cambridge, Massachusetts on September 20, 1924, the son of Max Mendel Dain, a pharmacist, and Beatrice Trilling Dain. Both of his parents were of Russian-Jewish heritage. Dain’s father Max was an amateur photographer and Dain would start shooting with his father's Rolleicord camera.

Dain attended high school at the Boston Latin School. He enlisted in the military in 1943, where he served as a communications specialist in the Signal Corps during World War II. After leaving the army in 1946, Dain attended the University of Miami where he studied history and government. After graduation, he relocated to Paris and enrolled at the Sorbonne on the GI Bill.

== Career ==
In Paris, Dain landed a job with the Pictorial Service, where he processed pictures for some of Europe’s leading photographers. This was also the time when Dain transitioned from shooting with a Rolleicord camera to 35mm cameras.

On returning to the United States in 1953, Dain settled in New York City, where he became a freelance photographer. His photographs were featured in exhibitions and published in numerous newspapers and magazines, including the New York Times, Time magazine, The Saturday Evening Post, Fortune, Esquire, and Popular Photography's Photography Annual, which featured the year’s best photographs.

Dain photographed a wide range of subjects including the 1955 Newport Jazz Festival, 1950's Paris, Native Americans, and the construction of the Lincoln Tunnel. He photographed numerous celebrities and politicians, including Ernest Hemingway in Pamplona, classical composers and musicians such as Carlos Chavez, Aaron Copland, Andres Segovia, Igor Stravinsky, and Heitor Villa-Lobos, and jazz musicians including Miles Davis and Louis Armstrong.

His interest in sports cars culminated in the book A Guide to American Sports Car Racing in 1960, which included photographs from the 1958 Little Le Mans endurance race at Lime Rock and the 1958 Watkins Glen Grand Prix.

In the early 1960s, Dain embarked on a project to capture the world of writer William Faulkner. Dain made several trips to Oxford, Mississippi, the first in August 1961, where he made contact with several of Faulkner's friends and acquaintances, including J. R. Cofield, Jim Silver, and Mac Reed. Later, he met Faulkner’s step-granddaughter, Victoria Fielden. Eventually, Dain was able to meet and photograph the writer at home. During Dain's final visit to Oxford, in 1962, he attended and photographed Faulkner's funeral. Select photographs from this project were published in the books Faulkner's County: Yoknapatawpha in 1964, and Faulkner's World: The Photographs of Martin J. Dain in 1997.

Dain's photographs of Oxford, Mississippi are held in the Martin J. Dain Collection at the University of Mississippi. Similarly, over 500 of Dain's prints, which were previously part of the Magnum Photos press prints collection, are held in a collection at the University of Texas at Austin's Harry Ransom Center.

== Critical reception ==
Of his book, Faulkner's World: The Photographs of Martin J. Dain, the Jackson Clarion Ledger said the book "provides context to the land and the people who provided the Nobel Prize winner with the rich vein he mined so well for so long. It is a glorious and painful collection of photographs, rich in detail, emotional in its spareness, connecting the reader with a past that gives clues to our present."

Of the exhibit of photographs from the book at the Birmingham Public Library Gallery, The Birmingham News said Dain's photography "offers an honest, gritty, humorous, and visual interview with time and place.... capturing the informality of this great author [Faulkner]... and recording a small Southern town carefully resting in a time warp".

The Lexington Herald-Leader, referring to the exhibit of the same photographs at the Kentucky Highlands Museum in Ashland, considered the "pictures of Faulkner... the weakest in the exhibit.... But overall the exhibit does work because to look at the pictures is to see Faulkner's inspiration made tangible.

== Personal life and death ==
Dain settled in Carmel Valley, California in 1971 and opened a shop in Carmel-by-the-Sea, selling Inuit and Native American artwork and sculptures.

Dain died on February 16, 2000 in Carmel Valley, California. He was 75.

== Publications ==
Publication Date	Title	Publisher	Author
1960	A Guide to American Sports Car Racing	Hanover House	Martin J. Dain (Photography), William S. Stone (Author)
1964	Faulkner's County: Yoknapatawpha	Random House	Martin J. Dain
1968	On the Beat: Policemen at Work	Harcourt	Barry Robinson and Martin J. Dain
1997	Faulkner's World: The Photographs of Martin J. Dain	University Press of Mississippi	Tom Rankin (Editor)
