= Interphone study =

The Interphone study (sometimes stylized as INTERPHONE) was a set of international case-control studies conducted with the aim of determining whether mobile phone use increased the risk of certain tumors, namely, glioma, meningioma, and schwannoma. The study was conducted by the International Agency for Research on Cancer (IARC) in thirteen countries, at a cost of $24 million. About fifty scientists worked on the study, which was the largest case-control study conducted on the association between mobile phones and cancer as of 2014. The study's results, published in 2010, indicated that mobile phone use did not increase the risk of tumors among most cell phone users, with the possible exception of an increased risk among the 10% of users who used their cell phones the most.

In the Interphone study, the top 10% of users used their phones 30 minutes/day. Some users reported using their cell phones >5 hours per day, but this was considered implausible at the time of the study. The median usage was less than 2.5 hours per month.

== History and design ==
In 1998 and 1999, the IARC conducted a feasibility study which concluded that a large case-control study examining the relationship between mobile phone use and risk of brain tumors would be "feasible and informative". After this conclusion was reached, Interphone began in 2000, and interviewed over 5,000 people with either glioma or meningioma. The study ended in 2006 and was originally due to be released that year, but its release was delayed until 2010 because scientists involved in the study could not agree on how its results should be described.

== Funding ==
Interphone received some funding from the mobile phone industry, including the Mobile Manufacturers Forum and Groupe Speciale Mobile Association, but this was subject to guarantees that the study would remain scientifically independent.

== Results ==
On May 17, 2010, the Interphone study's results were published in the International Journal of Epidemiology. The results indicated that overall, mobile phone use did not increase the risk of glioma or meningioma, and that, in fact, a decrease in risk was observed. The authors said this decrease may have been due to study limitations. However, the results also found that among people who were exposed to mobile phones the most (half an hour per day over ten years), there was evidence of an increase in risk of glioma. The study also concluded that "biases and error prevent a causal interpretation" with regard to the increased risk of glioma observed at the highest exposure levels. The authors also said that the number of people using their mobile phones this much was relatively small.

== Reaction ==
The results of the study were hailed by the mobile phone industry, but some researchers criticized the study, with an editorial accompanying it arguing that its results were likely due to bias. Michael Thun of the American Cancer Society noted that Interphone was the largest study of mobile phone use and tumor risk conducted to date, but also criticized it, saying in a statement that "The majority of participants in this study were not heavy cell phone users compared to today's practices." John Niederhuber, the then-director of the National Cancer Institute, said that Interphone "illustrates how difficult it is to identify and corroborate, or definitively rule out, any possible association between the two [i.e. cell phones and cancer]".
