= Michael Thun =

American cancer researcher

Michael J. Thun is an American cancer researcher and emeritus vice president of epidemiological research at the American Cancer Society (ACS).

== Education ==
Thun served in the United States Army for 3 years as a medic. Upon completion of military service, Thun received his bachelor's degree from Harvard College in 1970, his MD from the University of Pennsylvania School of Medicine in 1975, and his master's degree in epidemiology from the Harvard School of Public Health in 1983.

== Career ==
After receiving his masters', Thun worked for the New Jersey Department of Health and the Centers for Disease Control until 1989, when he joined the ACS as their director of analytic epidemiology. He was appointed vice president of epidemiology and surveillance research there in 1998, and held that position until he retired at the end of 2012.

== Research ==
Thun is known for his research into the health effects of tobacco, as well as for a number of studies he has published on the association between aspirin use and cancer risk. He has also published studies on other putative risk factors for cancer, such as red meat consumption and certain hair dyes.

== Views ==
Thun has advised people to limit their red meat consumption due to the adverse health affects associated with it. He has criticized the President’s Cancer Panel's 2010 report for arguing that the proportion of cancer cases caused by environmental factors has been "grossly underestimated."
