= Seven-layer salad =

American salad dish

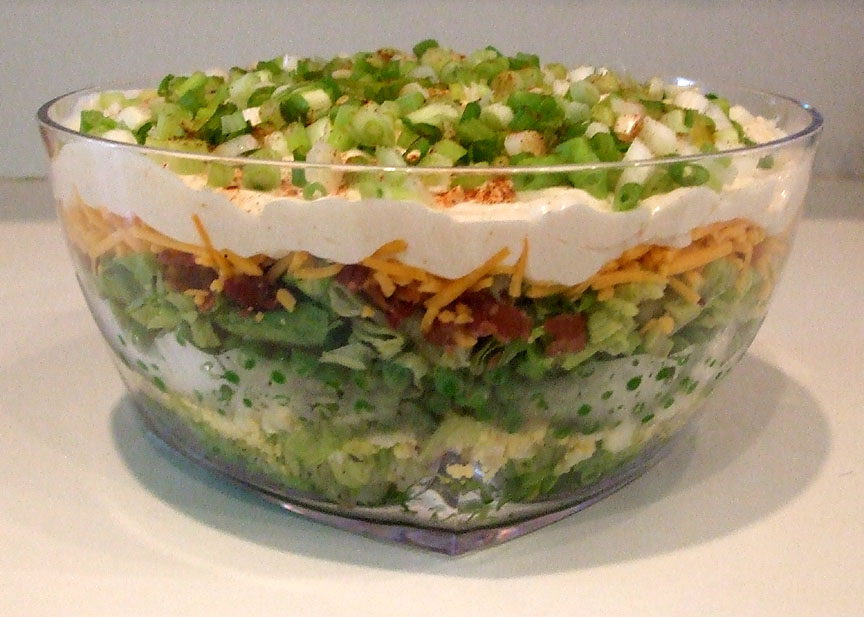
- Course: Salad
- Place of origin: United States
- Region or state: Southern United States
- Serving temperature: Cold
- Main ingredients: Iceberg lettuce, tomatoes, cucumbers, onions, sweet peas, hard-boiled eggs, sharp cheddar cheese, and bacon pieces

Seven-layer salad is an American dish that includes a colorful combination of seven layers of ingredients: iceberg lettuce, tomatoes, cucumbers, onions, sweet peas, hard-boiled eggs, sharp cheddar cheese, and bacon pieces. The salad is topped with a mayonnaise-based dressing and sometimes sour cream is added. It is often served in a glass bowl or large pan so the layers can be observed. The dish is often associated with potlucks, picnics, and barbecues, where a large gathering of people takes place and many people need to be fed. There are many variants of the seven-layer salad and it can be made with additional (or sometimes fewer) layers, making it (for example) an eight-layer salad instead.

== History ==
Although there are many variations, the traditional seven-layer salad has remained the same for decades. The dish may have originated in the South and was called the "seven-layer pea salad" for its main layers of peas. The traditional seven-layer salad is covered with a coating of mayonnaise (and sometimes sour cream) and includes eggs and bacon. It has been said to have "helped give salads of the 1950s a bad name... when it came to health."

== Variations ==
Popular variations on the home-made salad's ingredients include ham, mushrooms, celery, carrots, and bell peppers. The dish remains a party staple, and its impressive height and layered architecture have been adapted by some restaurant chefs, though "our mothers were stacking long before many of today's chefs were even born." Cooks modifying the salad include those at Aura restaurant on Lincoln Road in Florida who include sliced mozzarella, red tomatoes and basil layered for red, green and white color, and others using fruit, cutting back on high-fat ingredients, substituting low-fat yogurt or a vinaigrette dressing for the mayonnaise/sour cream, and modifying the ingredients with ethnic and gourmet foods such as tomatillos, chickpeas, black beans and pepperoni. Another chef who serves items with "a sense of humor" offers "an updated seven-layer salad in a tortilla, where the ground beef of the [1970s] is exchanged for grilled shrimp."

== See also ==
- List of salads
- Potato salad
- Snickers salad
- Cookie salad
- Jello salad
- Pistachio salad
- Hotdish
- Glorified rice
- Baked beans
