= Glorified rice =

Dessert from the American Midwest

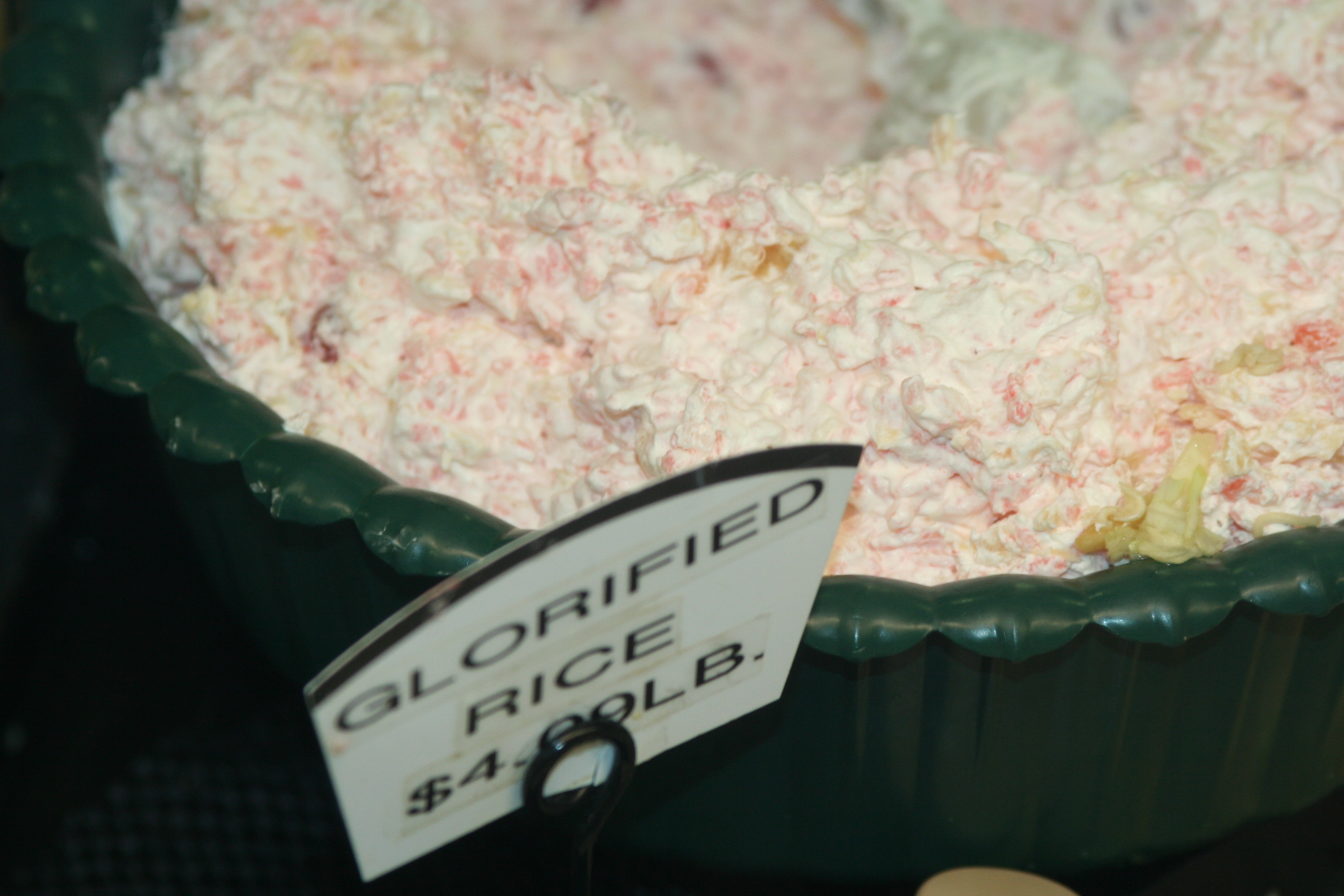
- Glorified rice at a supermarket in Minnesota
- Course: Dessert
- Place of origin: United States
- Region or state: Minnesota and the Upper Midwest
- Serving temperature: Cold
- Main ingredients: Rice, crushed pineapple, whipped cream
- Variations: with marshmallows, gelatin, Jell-O, fruit cocktail, maraschino cherries, bananas, apples, nuts, pie filling or Cool Whip

Glorified rice is a dessert salad popular in the Midwestern cuisine served in Minnesota and other states in the Upper Midwest, United States and other places with Norwegian populations. It is popular in more rural areas with sizable Lutheran populations of Scandinavian heritage. It is made from rice, crushed pineapple and whipped cream. It is often decorated with maraschino cherries.

== History ==
The long-established recipe has been the subject of many newspaper articles. In 1995, Janet Letnes Martin and Suzann Nelson authored a humorous book comparing Lutheran and Catholic traditions called They Glorified Mary…We Glorified Rice: A Catholic–Lutheran Lexicon. The book includes a recipe for glorified rice. The dish is also included in the title of Carrie Young's Prairie Cooks: Glorified Rice, Three-Day Buns, and Other Recipes and Reminiscences. Glorified rice often turns up at potlucks and church picnics.

== See also ==
- Jello salad
- Watergate salad
- Snickers salad
- Cookie salad
- Midwestern cuisine
- Ambrosia (fruit salad)
- Risalamande, similar dish in Danish and other Scandinavian cuisine
- List of salads
