= Watergate cake =

American cake

- Type: Dessert
- Place of origin: United States
- Main ingredients: Pistachio pudding

Watergate cake is a pistachio cake popular in the U.S. which shares its name with the Watergate scandal of the 1970s, although the name's origin is not clear. The cake pre-dates Watergate salad, a dessert made with similar ingredients including pistachio pudding.

== Ingredients and preparation ==
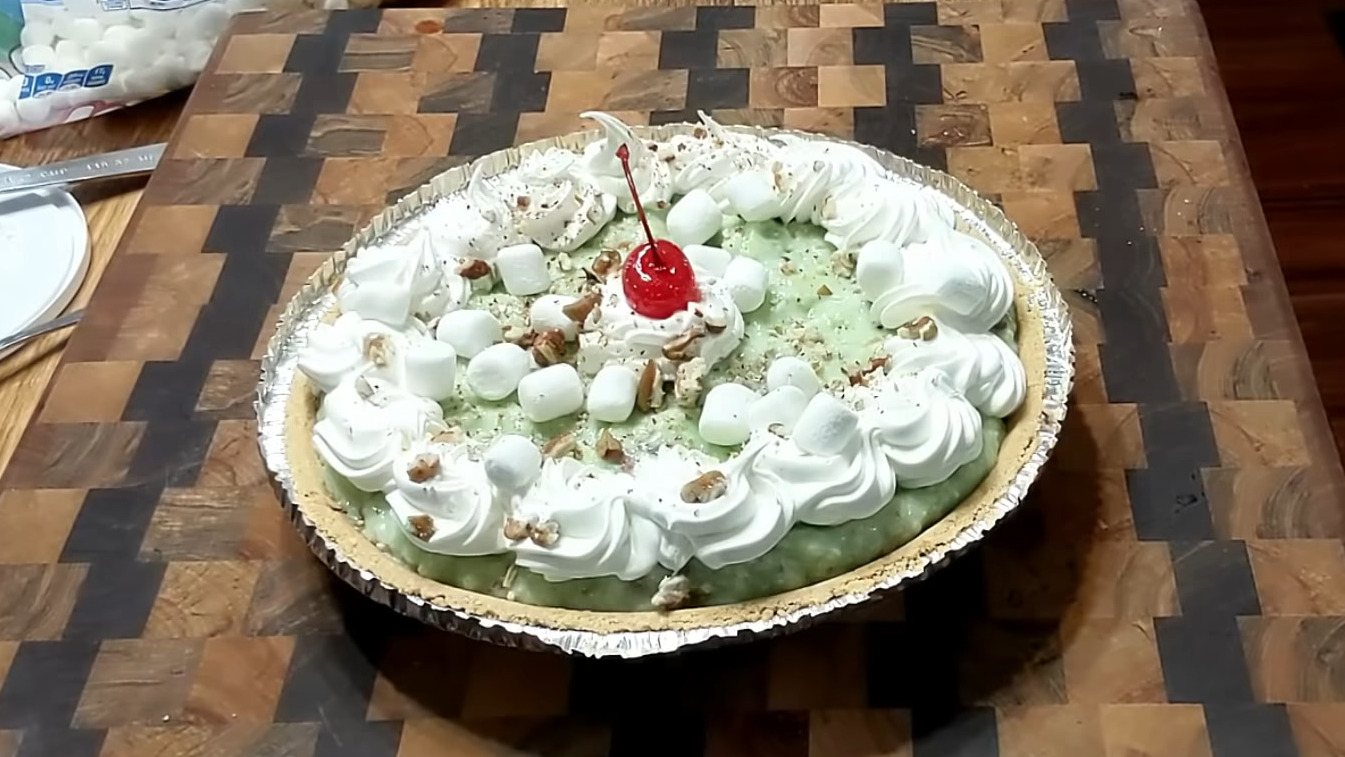
A rendition of "Watergate pie", a similar dish

Watergate cake mix can contain pistachio-flavor pudding, marshmallows, nuts, crushed pineapple, whipped cream, and green food coloring. The cake is then covered in icing symbolizing a "cover-up", in reference to the Watergate scandal, during which the Nixon administration attempted to conceal its involvement in the 1972 break-in at the Democratic National Committee offices in the Watergate complex.

Vintage Cakes (2012) by baker Julie Richardson describes a Watergate cake made from "a pistachio layer cake with mascarpone mousse frosting." Richardson's recipe calls for a pistachio cake, pudding, and an "impeachment" pistachio frosting of mascarpone, topped with caramelized pistachios.

A family recipe from Washington Post critic Tom Sietsema calls for a base made from white cake mix, instant pistachio pudding, 7 Up soda, eggs, vegetable oil, and walnuts, which is baked, covered with icing made from instant pudding mix and Cool Whip, and topped with maraschino cherries. In some variations, the base contains another type nut rather than walnut, club soda or ginger ale instead of 7 Up, and coconut, and it can be baked as a Bundt cake, cupcake, or layer cake. In the southern U.S., pecans are often used in the cake due to their prevalence in the region.

== History ==
=== Origin ===
The Jell-O company started selling its pistachio pudding mix in 1976, amidst a trend in American cuisine whereby people created salad dishes containing ingredients such as Cool Whip, nuts, pineapple, and pudding. General Foods, then owner of the Jell-O brand, published a recipe for "Pistachio Pineapple Delight" that would later become Watergate salad. Two Watergate-related cookbooks were published in 1973: The Watergate Cook (Or, Who's in the Soup?) by The Committee to Write the Cookbook and The Watergate Cookbook. The latter book featured "unimpeachable recipes" all containing pistachio gelatin, such as a "Watergate Cake with Cover-Up Icing", which became popular after it was disseminated by media outlets.

According to WAMU reporter Gabe Bullard, the name may be satirical wordplay: an early recipe published by the Hagerstown Daily Mail of Maryland in September 1974 (a month after the resignation of Richard Nixon) credits Christine Hatcher, who gave the cake its name "because of all the nuts that are in it." Author Joseph Rodota, who has written on the Watergate Hotel, said "It could've been a Democratic partisan who wanted to make sure the Watergate name lived on, because the Republicans were very intent on turning the page." Susan Benjamin, a West Virginian historian of candy, claims the name "came out of the mouths of the people who ate it," a jab at the Nixon administration following the Watergate scandal. Leslie Cole for Oregon Live writes that the Watergate Cake was a "vehicle" for people to purchase pudding and cake mixes, like many 1960s and 1970s recipes.

It is not known whether the Watergate Hotel ever sold Watergate cake or salad. According to Joseph Rodota, "the lack of answer is fitting" regarding the origin of the cake's name: "The bakery, like the hotel, was quite upscale. A cake made with cheap ingredients was off-brand for a hotel known for luxury and privacy." However, the cake originated in a time of what Rodota describes as "Watergate consumerism", and one shop in the Watergate complex was known to have sold "ties with plastic bugs on them". The Watergate Pastry Shop also reportedly denied knowledge of the cake despite its popularity in stores, and none of its dessert products contained pistachios.

=== Popularity ===
A shortage of one brand of pistachio pudding in Washington, D.C. occurred in 1975, starting around Thanksgiving and becoming especially worse in Christmas, partly due to poor pistachio crops. A spokesperson for the Giant Food grocery stores claimed the shortage was exacerbated by the large numbers of home cooks baking Watergate cakes.
