= Salad =

Dish of foods mixed together

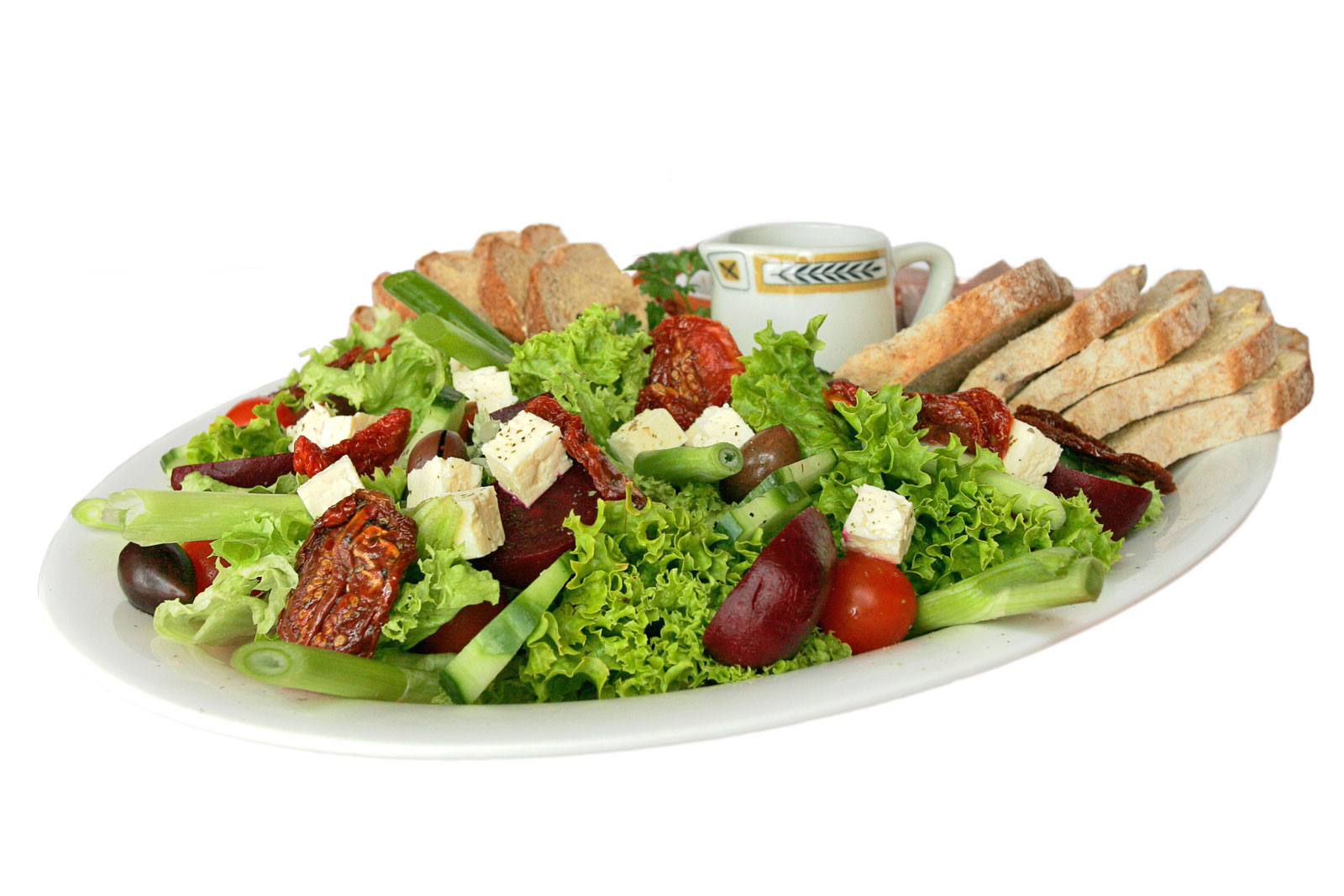
- A garden salad platter served with bread and dressing on the side, consisting of lettuce, beetroot, cucumber, scallions, cherry tomatoes, olives, sun-dried tomatoes, and feta
- Main ingredients: Pieces of vegetables, fruits, eggs, or grains mixed with a sauce
- Variations: Many

A salad is a dish consisting of mixed ingredients, frequently vegetables. They are typically served chilled or at room temperature, though some can be served warm. Condiments called salad dressings, which exist in a variety of flavors (generally savory), are often added to a salad.

Garden salads are plant-based salads made from ingredients commonly found in gardens, including raw leaf vegetables (sometimes young "baby" greens) such as lettuce, arugula (rocket), kale or spinach, often with tomato and cucumber; they are common enough that the word salad alone often refers specifically to garden salads. Other types of salad include caprese salad, bean salad, tuna salad, bread salads (such as fattoush, panzanella), vegetable salads without leafy greens (such as Greek salad, potato salad, coleslaw), rice-, pasta- and noodle-based salads, fruit salads, and dessert salads.

Salads may be served at any point during a meal:

- Appetizer salads – light, smaller-portion salads served as the first course of the meal
- Side salads – to accompany the main course as a side dish; examples include potato salad and coleslaw
- Main course salads – usually containing a portion of one or more high-protein foods, such as eggs, legumes, or cheese
- Dessert salads – sweet salads containing fruit, gelatin, sweeteners or whipped cream

When a sauce is used to flavor a salad, it is generally called a dressing; most salad dressings are based on either a mixture of oil and vinegar or a creamy dairy base.

== Etymology ==
The word "salad" comes to English first as "salad" or "sallet" in the 14th century, it is derived from the French salade of the same meaning, itself an abbreviated form of the earlier Vulgar Latin herba salata (salted herb), from the Latin salata (salted), from sal (salt) because vegetables were seasoned with brine (a solution of salt in water) or salty oil-and-vinegar dressings during Roman times.

The phrase "salad days", meaning a "time of youthful inexperience" (based on the notion of "green"), is first recorded by Shakespeare in 1606, while the use of salad bar, referring to a buffet-style serving of salad ingredients, first appeared in American English in 1937.

== History ==
Ancient Greeks and Romans ate mixed greens with dressing, a type of mixed salad. Salads, including layered and dressed salads, have been popular in Europe since the Greek and Roman imperial expansions. In his 1699 book, Acetaria: A Discourse of Sallets, often considered the first book on salads, John Evelyn attempted with little success to encourage his fellow Britons to eat fresh salad greens. Mary, Queen of Scots, ate boiled celery root over greens covered with creamy mustard dressing, truffles, chervil, and slices of hard-boiled eggs.

Oil used on salads can be found in ancient Greece and ancient Rome, and also in the 17th-century colony of New Netherland (later called New York, New Jersey and Delaware). A list of common items arriving on ships and their designated prices when appraising cargo included "a can of salad oil at 1.10 florins" and "an anker of wine vinegar at 16 florins". In a 1665 letter to the Director of New Netherland from the Island of Curaçao there is a request to send greens: "I request most amicably that your honors be pleased to send me seed of every sort, such as cabbage, carrots, lettuce, parsley, etc. for none can be acquired here and I know that your honor has plenty,...".

Salads may be sold in supermarkets, at restaurants and at fast food chains. In the United States, restaurants may have a salad bar with salad-making ingredients, which the customers will use to put together their salad. Salad restaurants were earning more than $300 million in 2014. At-home salad consumption in the 2010s was rising but moving away from fresh-chopped lettuce and toward bagged greens and salad kits, with bag sales expected to reach $7 billion per year.

== Types ==
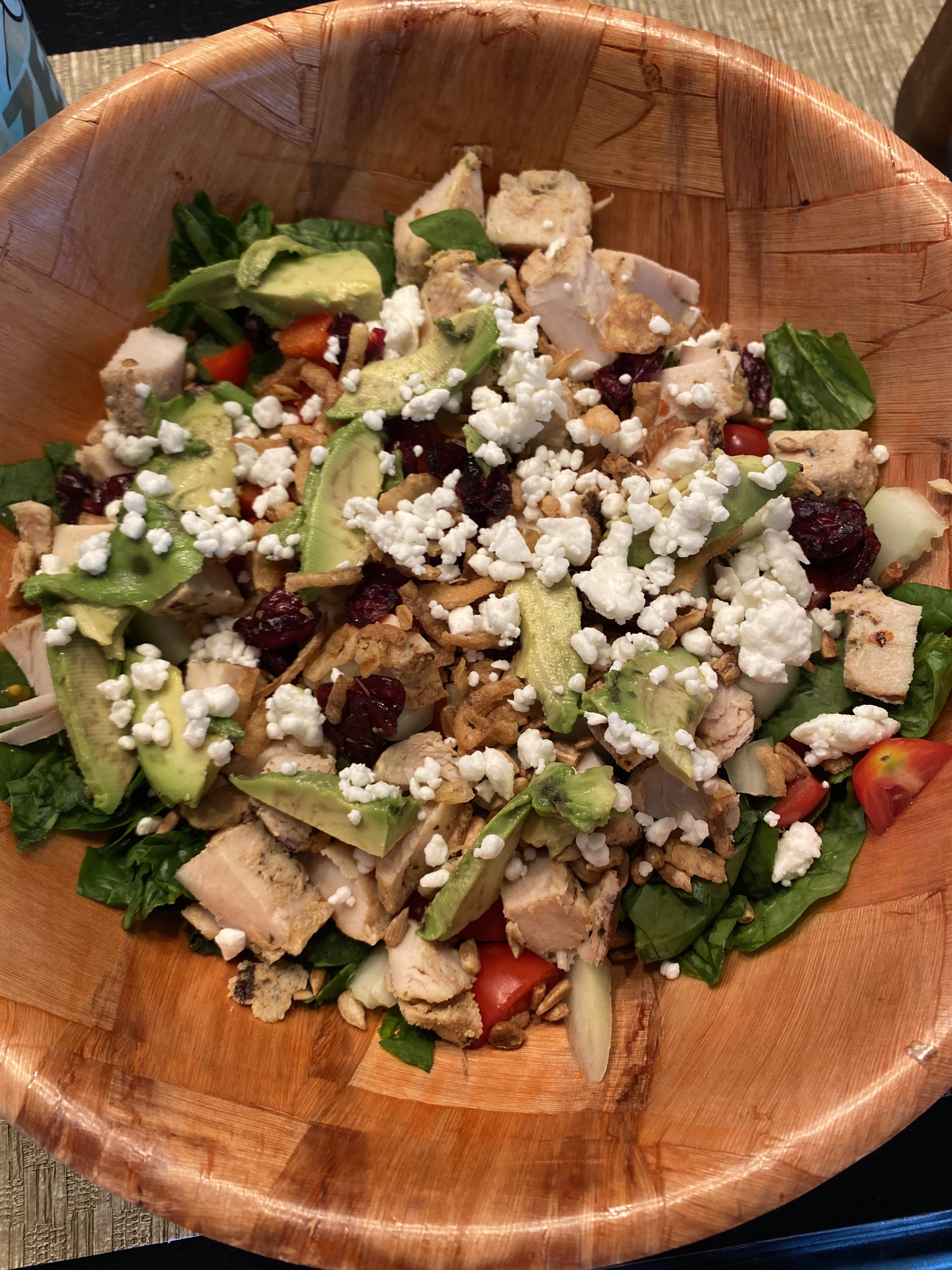
A large mixed salad

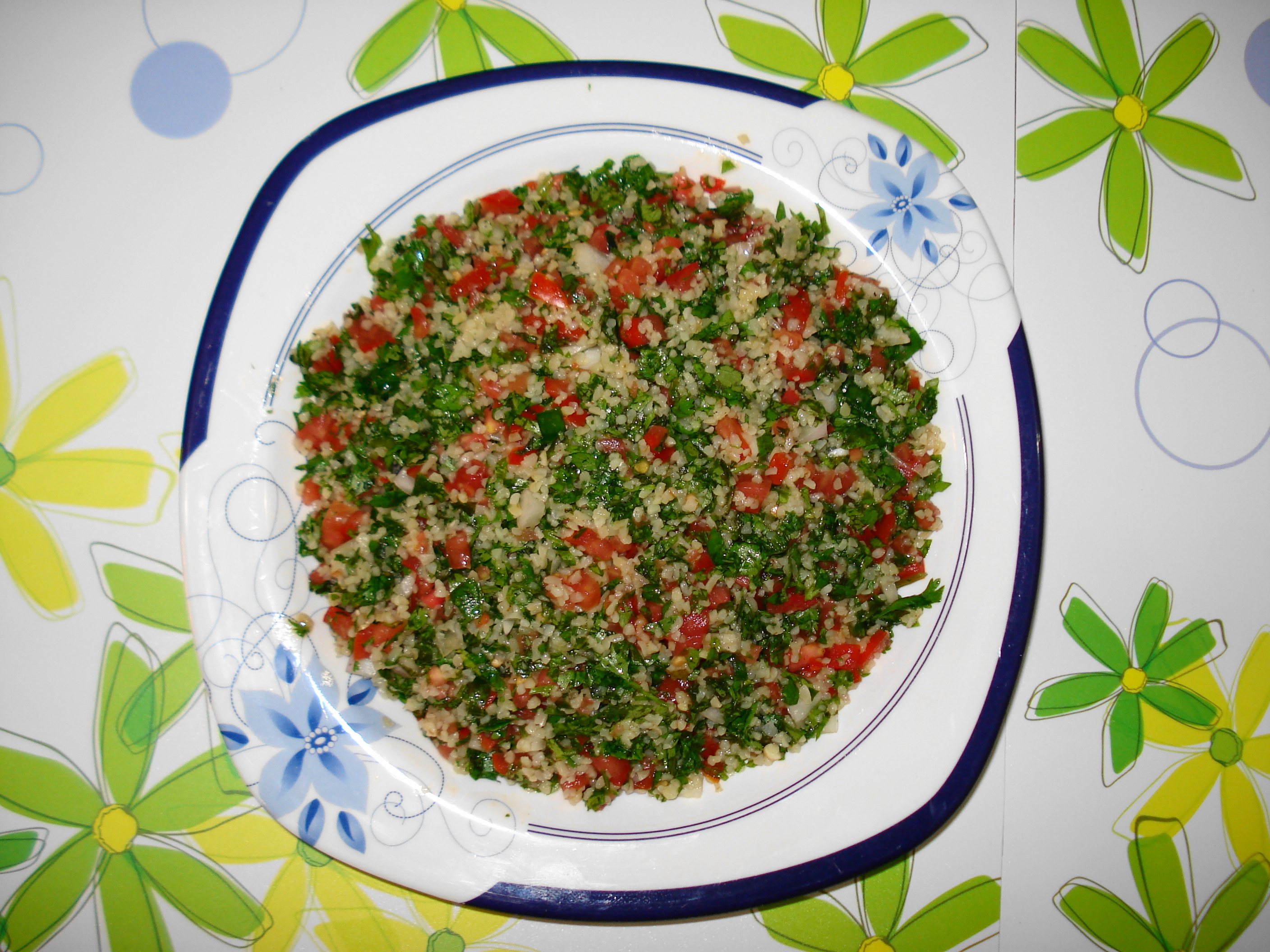
A Middle Eastern salad called taboulleh

A salad can be a composed salad (with the ingredients specifically arranged on the serving dish) or a tossed salad (with the ingredients placed in a bowl and mixed, often with salad dressing). An antipasto plate, the first dish of a formal Italian meal, is similar to a composed salad, and has vegetables, cheese, and meat.

=== Green salad ===
A green salad, or green leaf salad, another name for garden salad, is most often composed of leafy vegetables such as lettuce varieties, spinach, or rocket (arugula). If non-greens make up a large portion of the salad it may instead be called a vegetable salad. Common raw vegetables (in the culinary sense) used in a salad include cucumbers, peppers, tomatoes, onions, carrots, celery, radishes, mushrooms, avocado, olives, artichoke hearts, heart of palm, watercress, parsley, fennel, garden beets, and green beans. Nuts, berries, seeds, lentils, and flowers are less common components. Hard-boiled eggs, bacon, shrimp, and cheeses may be used as garnishes, but large amounts of animal-based foods would be more likely in a dinner salad.

==== Wedge salad ====
A wedge salad is a green salad made from a head of lettuce (often iceberg), halved or quartered, with other ingredients on top.

=== Bound salads ===
Bound salads are assembled with thick sauces such as mayonnaise. One portion of a bound salad will hold its shape when placed on a plate with a scoop. Examples of bound salad include tuna salad, chicken salad, egg salad, coleslaw, and potato salad. Some bound salads are used as sandwich fillings. Some pasta salads, e.g. macaroni salad, are bound salads. They are popular at picnics, potlucks and barbecues.

=== Dinner salads ===
Main course salads (known as dinner salads or as entrée salads in the United States) may contain small pieces of poultry, seafood, or steak. Caesar salad, chef salad, Cobb salad, Chinese chicken salad, Michigan salad, and Pittsburgh salad are dinner salads.

A wide variety of cheeses are used in dinner salads, including Roquefort blue cheese (traditional for a Cobb salad) and Swiss (for chef and Cobb salads).

=== Fruit salads ===
Fruit salads are made of fruit (in the culinary sense), which may be fresh or canned. Examples include fruit cocktail.

=== Dessert salads ===
Dessert salads rarely include leafy greens and are often sweet. Common variants are made with gelatin or whipped cream; e.g. jello salad, pistachio salad, and ambrosia. Other forms of dessert salads include regional dishes such as Midwestern America's ambrosia-like glorified rice and cookie salad, which contains crumbled cookies as an ingredient.

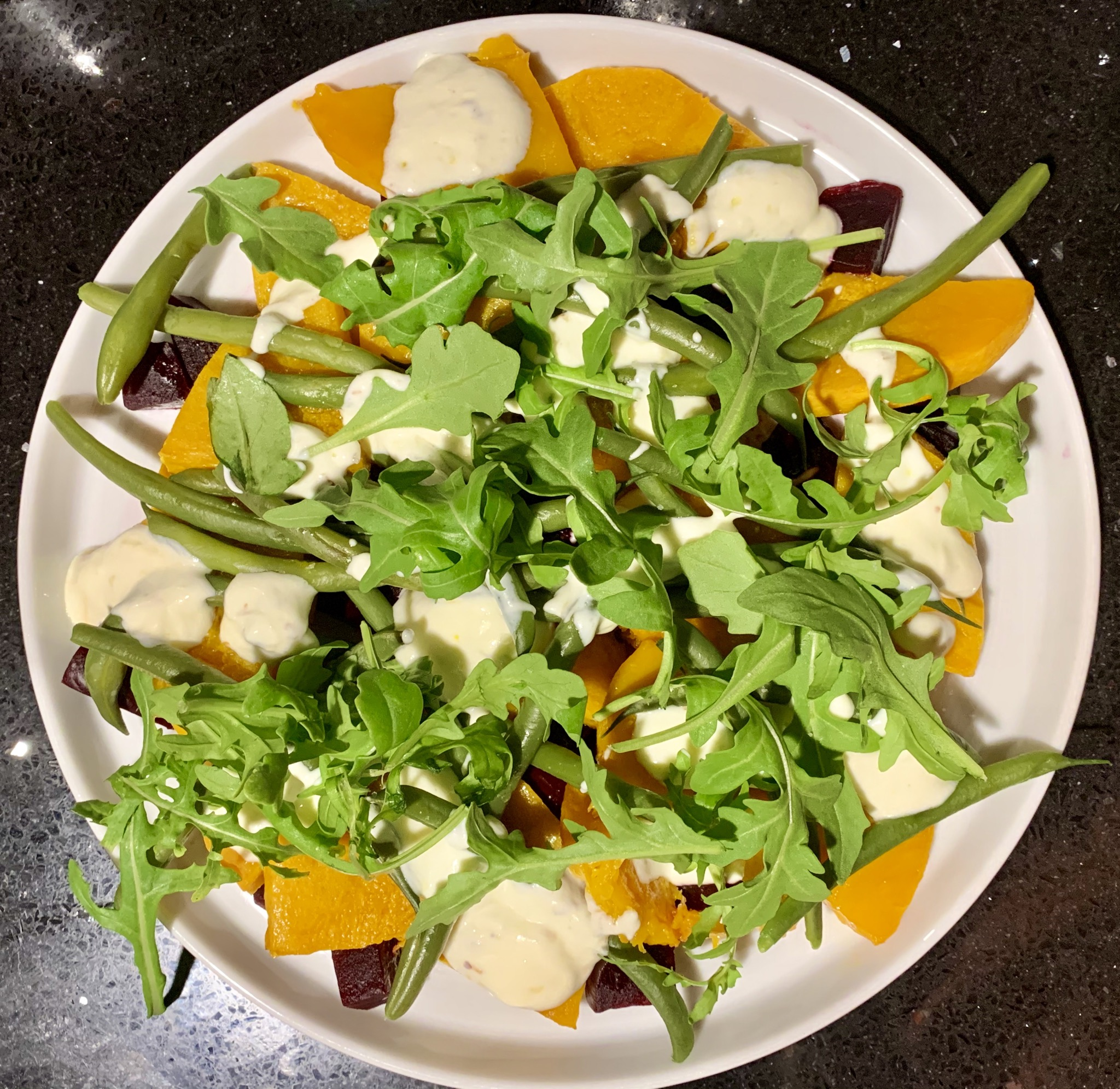
A tossed green salad

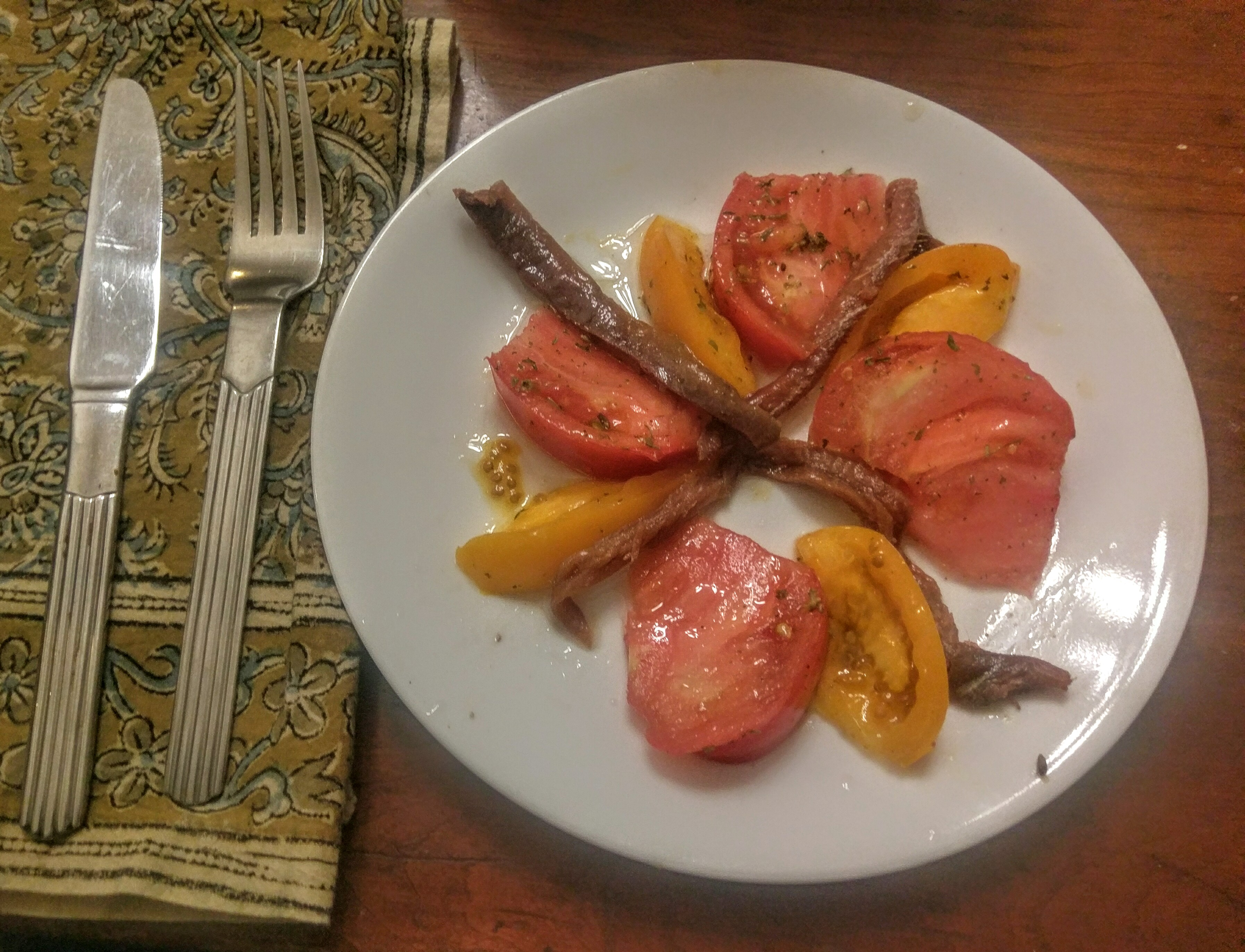
A simple salad of anchovies and tomato wedges

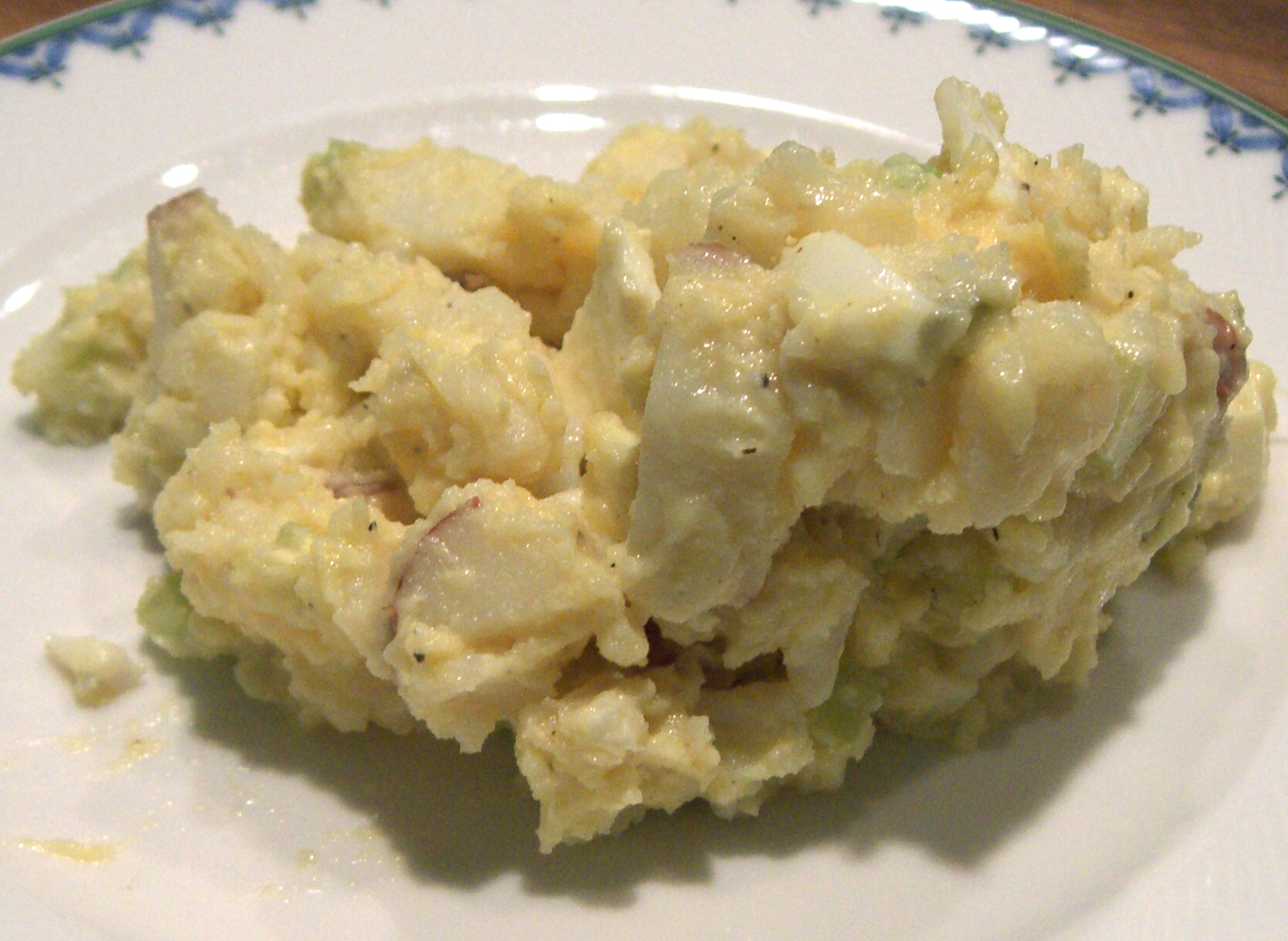
American-style potato salad with egg and mayonnaise

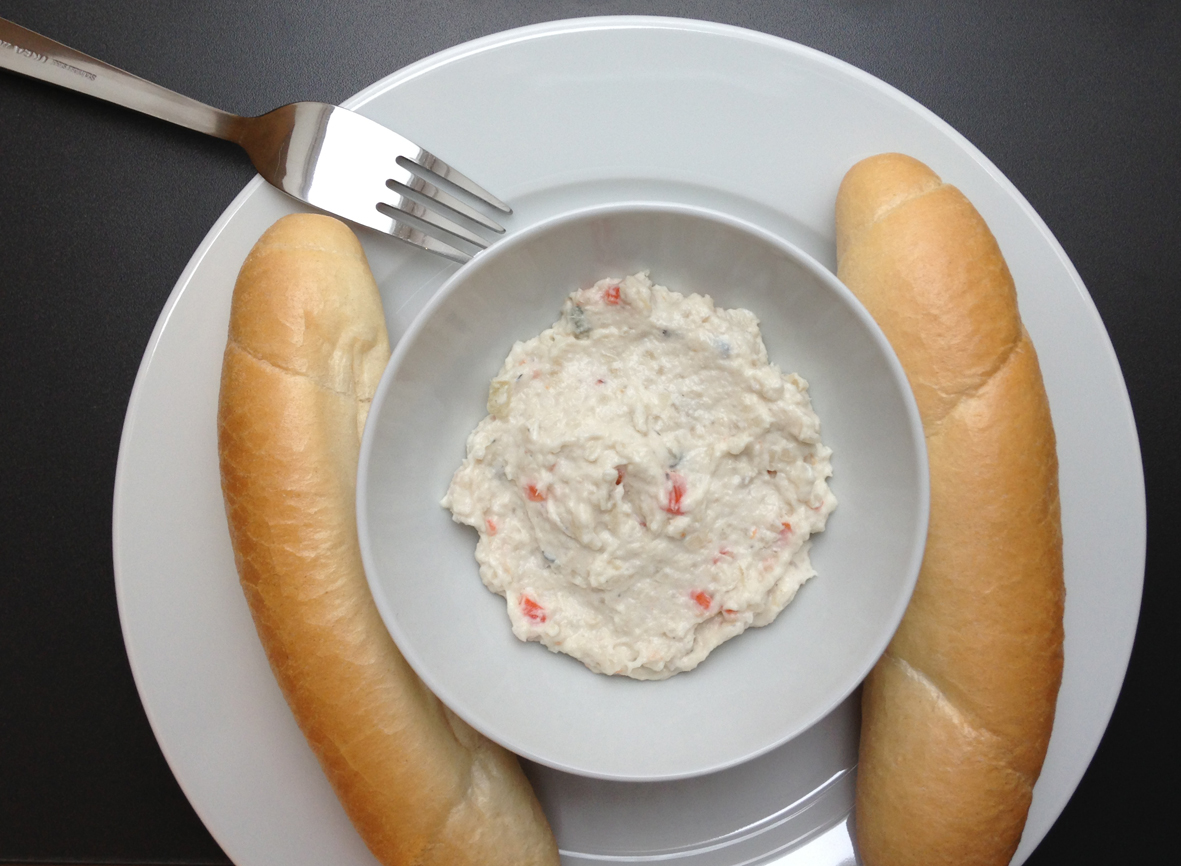
A traditional Slovak fish salad of cod in mayonnaise, treska s majonézou

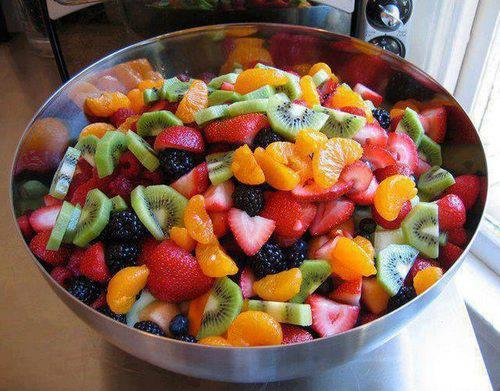
Fruit salad

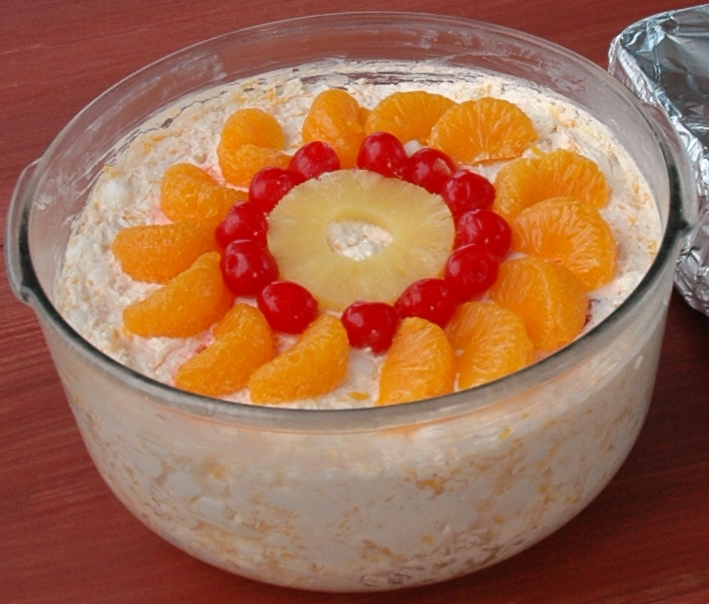
Ambrosia, a dessert salad

== See also ==
- Antipasto
- Salad spinner
