= Chubby bunny =

Game in which marshmallows are stuffed into the mouth

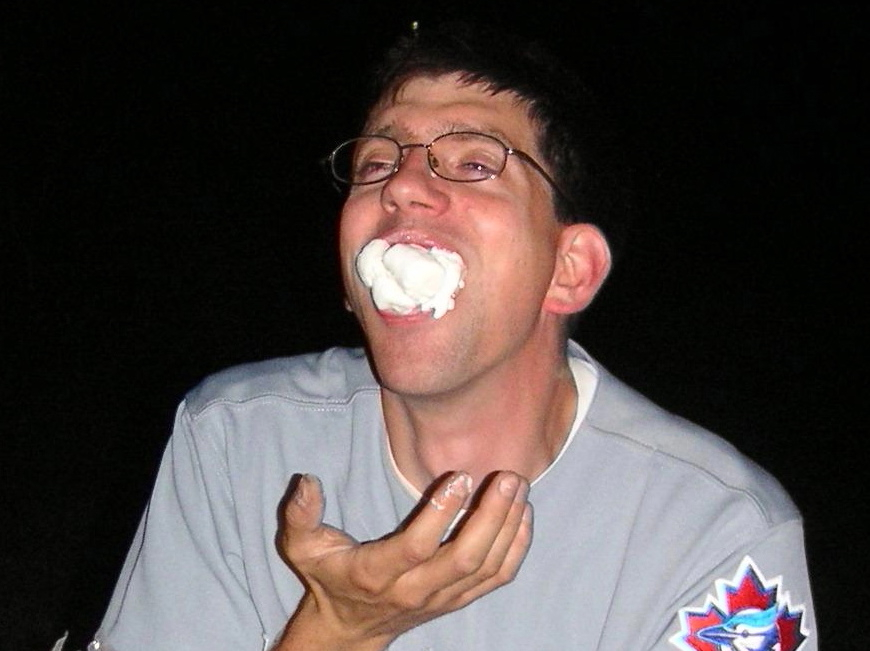
A man playing chubby bunny

Chubby bunny is an informal recreational and hazing game, or theater game, that involves the placement of an increasing number of marshmallows or similar items such as cotton balls into one's own mouth and stating a phrase that is intended to be difficult to say clearly with a filled mouth. The game is often played where marshmallows are readily available, such as around a campfire. Variations include similar-sounding phrases such as pudgy bunny, fluffy bunny, fuzzy bunny, chubby monkey, jungle bunny and chubby buddy.

Although the origins of the game are unknown, a 1959 Peanuts comic strip shows Snoopy's mouth being filled with an increasing number of marshmallows while Charlie Brown keeps count. The once-popular TV series What's with Andy? might have contributed to its popularity in the 21st century after airing an episode in which protagonist Andy Larkin and his friend Danny do the challenge.

== Rules ==
In the game, each participant usually places a marshmallow into their mouth and says 'chubby bunny'. If they are able to state the whole phrase, usually in a comprehensible manner that the other participants wholly concur to, they pass that round. Each successful player then adds an additional marshmallow to the ones already in their mouth and repeats the phrase. A player who fails to complete the phrase is eliminated from the game. The process continues until only one player remains. After the penultimate player loses the game, the winning player might have to place one more marshmallow into their mouth and may have to state the phrase once more. The winner of the game is the player who fits the most marshmallows into their mouth. Some variants of the game require the winner to actually ingest the marshmallows.

As a theater game, the premise is for two people to act out a short skit that is intended to have a serious tone (e.g. a patient and doctor in a hospital, or a married couple discussing divorce), while everyone else in the theater group forms an audience. Every time someone laughs for any reason, the performers (or the performer who most recently spoke) must put a marshmallow in their mouths, thus making it increasingly difficult to take the 'serious' skit seriously and increasingly likely that someone will laugh. The challenge is to finish the skit before the performers become hopelessly incoherent.

== Cases of deaths ==
At least three people have died of suffocation by choking on marshmallows.

On June 4, 1999, 12-year-old Catherine "Casey" Fish died after choking on four marshmallows while playing chubby bunny. The contest was scheduled for the annual Care Fair held at Hoffman Elementary School in Chicago's North Shore area. It was to be supervised, but Casey and some of her friends began playing while the teacher was momentarily away. She collapsed and was taken to Glenbrook Hospital, where she was pronounced dead a few hours later. John and Therese Fish, Casey's parents, subsequently sued Glenview Elementary School District 34 and Casey's teacher, who eventually agreed to a $2 million settlement. They also appeared on The Oprah Winfrey Show to warn about the dangers of chubby bunny.

On September 12, 2006, Janet Rudd, 32, from London, Ontario, Canada died in a chubby bunny competition at the Western Fair. St John Ambulance volunteers initially came to Rudd's aid prior to the arrival of paramedics from Thames EMS. The paramedics arrived with equipment including a defibrillator and suction devices, but were unable to remove the blockage in the unconscious woman's throat.

On 7 October 2023, 37-year-old Natalie Buss choked to death after taking part in a marshmallow eating competition at a rugby club. She collapsed and died shortly after competing onstage at a Beddau RFC fundraising evening on 7 October. At the inquest, Coroner Patricia Morgan heard the competition involved fitting as many marshmallows in her mouth as possible. Ms Morgan was told that Ms Buss appeared to be choking and CPR was carried out until paramedics arrived; she could not be revived and died at the scene.

== See also ==
- Chipmunking, strategy in competitive eating
- Hamster, able to hold food in its cheeks
