= Cookie salad =

Type of dessert salad

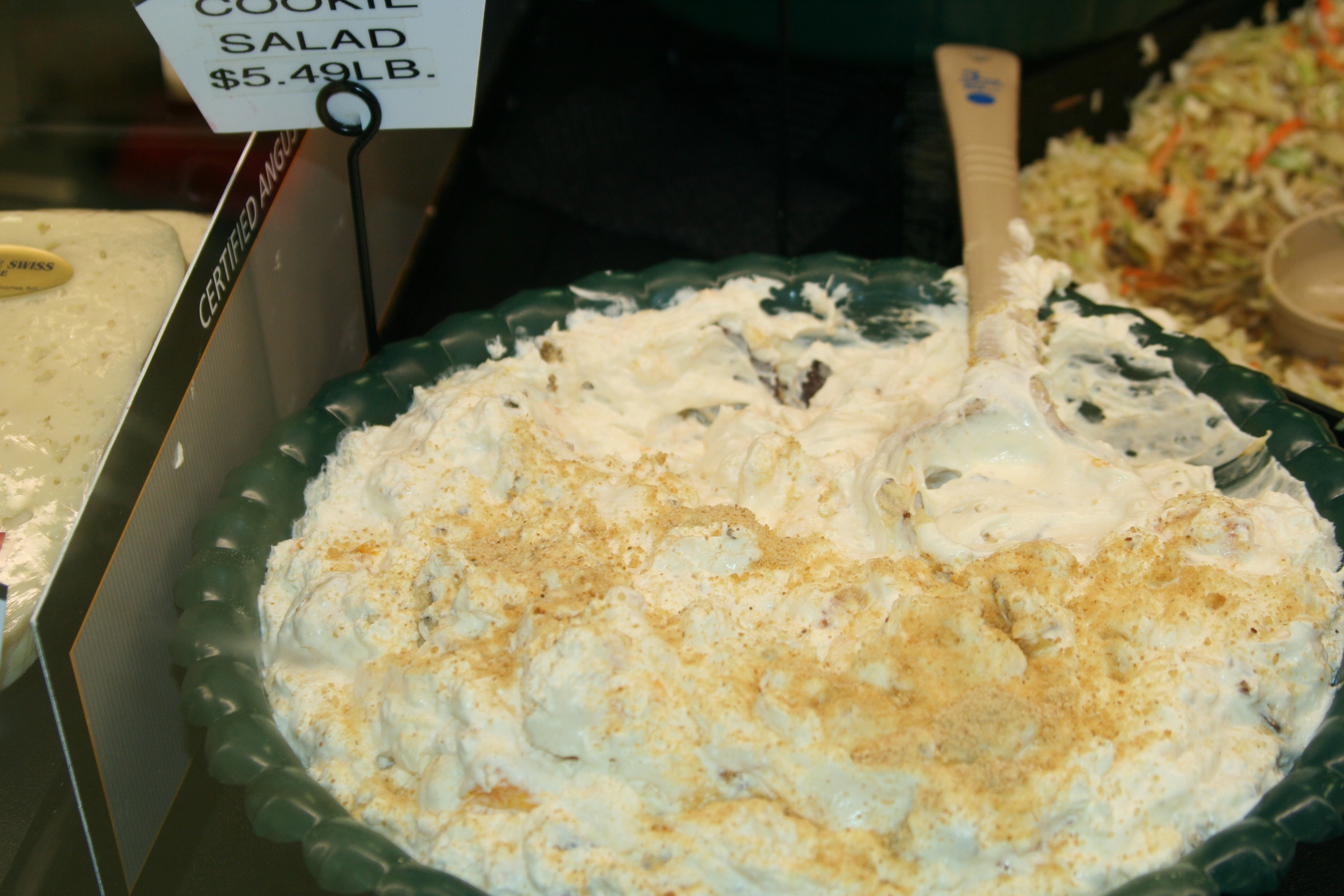
- Cookie salad at a supermarket in Minnesota
- Course: Dessert
- Place of origin: United States
- Region or state: Midwest
- Serving temperature: Cold
- Main ingredients: Fudge stripe shortbread cookies, vanilla pudding, whipped cream, mandarin oranges

Cookie salad is a dessert salad from the U.S. states of Minnesota and North Dakota made with buttermilk, vanilla pudding, whipped cream, mandarin oranges, crushed pineapple, and fudge stripe shortbread cookies. Dessert salads, like glorified rice and cookie salad, are more common in the cuisine of the Midwestern United States than other parts of the country. They are popular with children and a common contribution to holiday tables and potlucks. Berries can also be added. The salad is also prepared in other areas of the Midwestern United States.

== See also ==
- Glorified rice
- Snickers salad
- Watergate salad
