= Strawberry delight =

Dessert salad

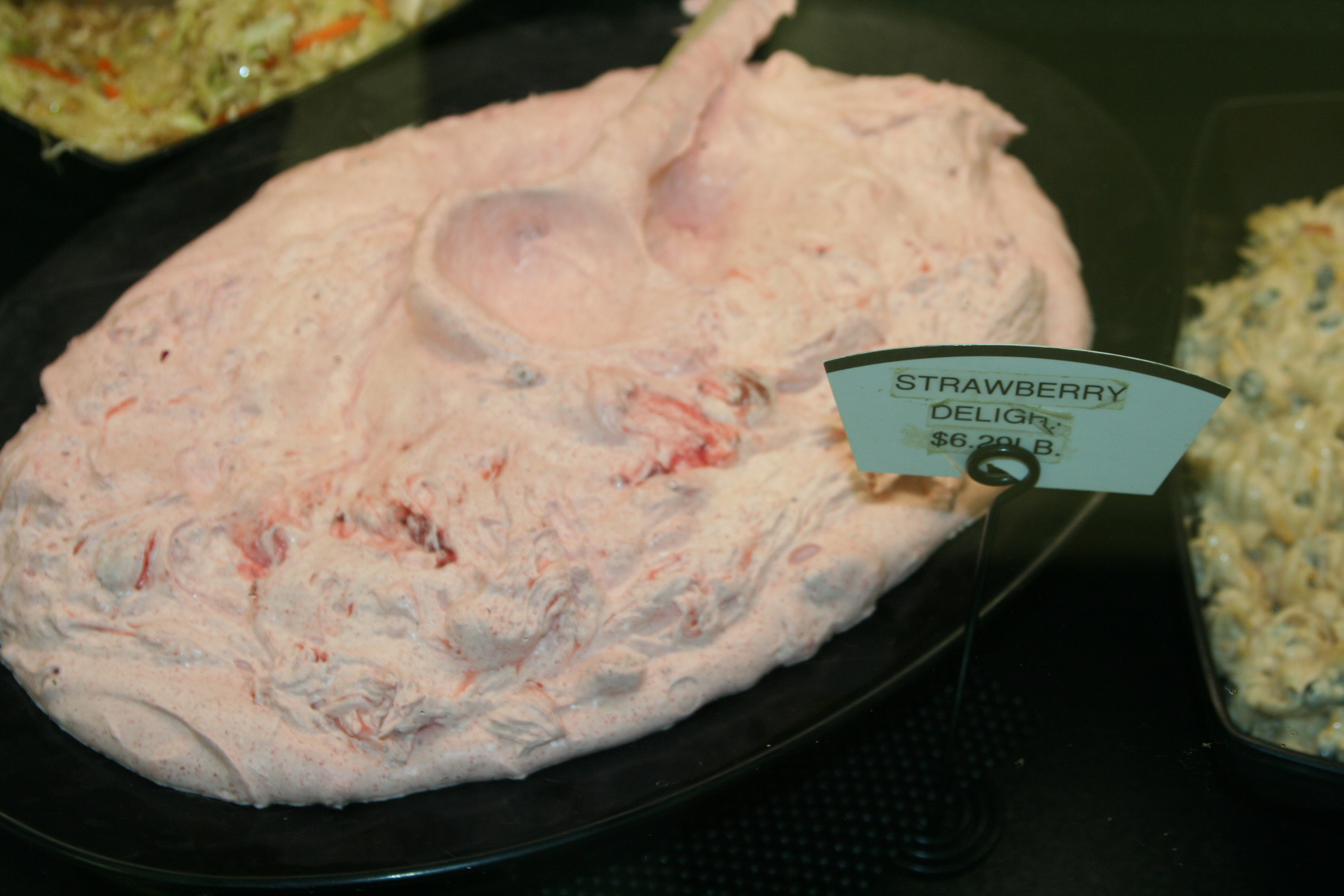
- Strawberry delight at a Minnesota supermarket
- Type: Dessert salad
- Place of origin: United States
- Region or state: Minnesota
- Main ingredients: Crust: graham cracker and butter Filling: milk, whipped topping, cream cheese, strawberries and strawberry gelatin

Strawberry delight is a dessert salad found in the United States, especially in the South and more rural areas of Minnesota. Strawberry delight is made from milk, whipped topping, cream cheese, strawberries and strawberry gelatin over a graham cracker crust. Variations include ingredients such as ice cream, canned fruit (mandarin oranges and pineapple can be used), marshmallows, lemon juice, and walnuts. The crust ingredients are mixed and pressed in a pan with the creamy ingredients mixed and added on top. Boiling water is added to the strawberry gelatin mix, strawberries are added to it, and then that mixture is poured over the creamy mixture in the pan, all of which is then refrigerated to set.

The strawberry delight moniker is also used to refer to cookies, cakes, and other foods that have some of the same pinkish, sweet qualities. A soda fountain version with sponge cake and ice cream was featured in a 1922 edition of The Soda fountain newsletter.

In Persian cuisine, strawberry delight (deser-e toot farangi) is made with berries dipped in liquified sugar flavored with vanilla and rosewater. Strawberries, walnut or almond oil, and powdered milk have also been suggested for a "strawberry delight" skin cream. The name Strawberry Delight has also been given to hosta (H. longipes X H. pycnophylla) and fuchsia. A version has also been featured in an Indonesian-English reader.

== See also ==
- List of strawberry dishes
- List of desserts
- List of salads
