= Frazee, Minnesota =

City in Minnesota, United States

- City
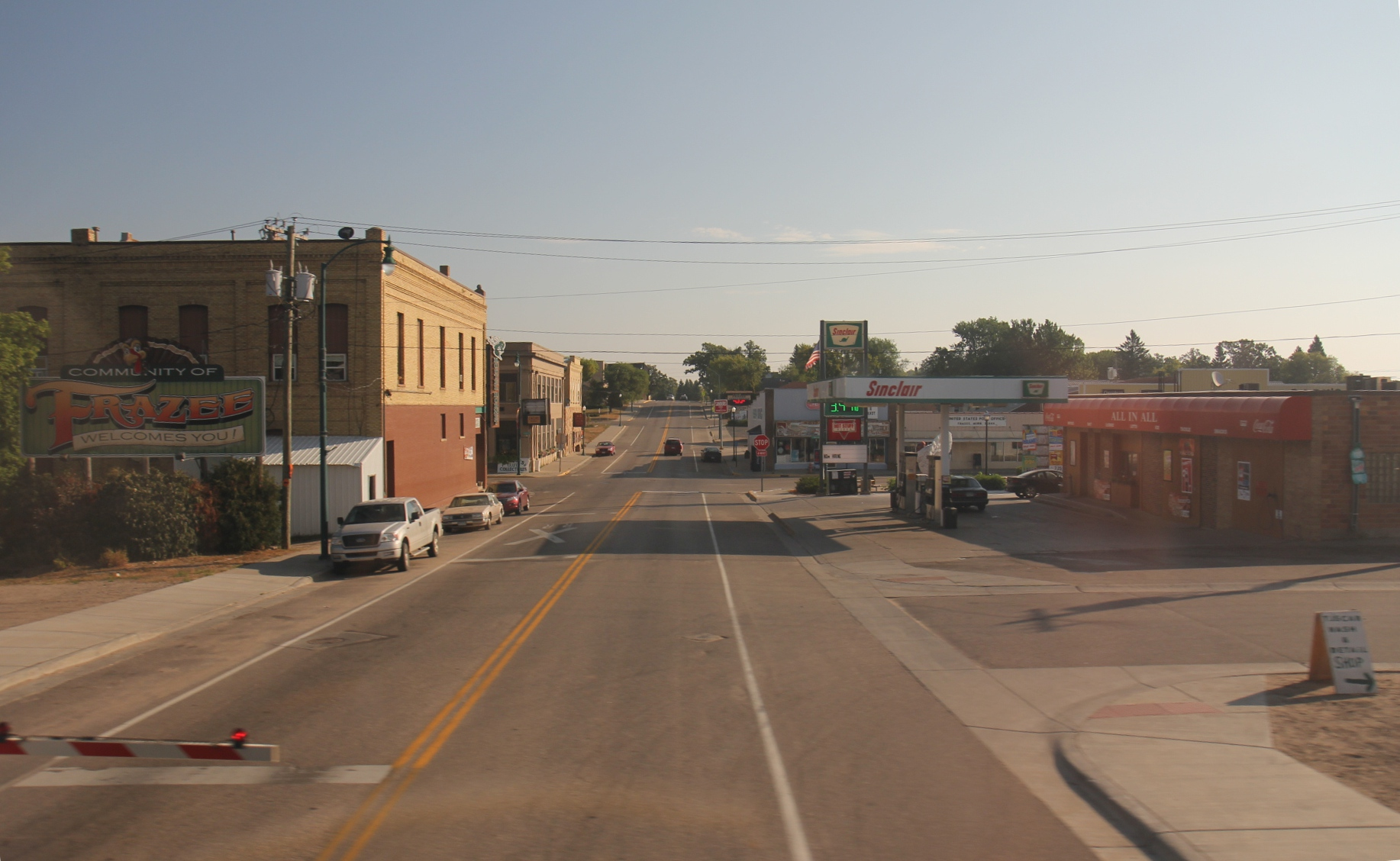
- Downtown Frazee
- Nicknames: "The Hive", "Turkey Town"
- Motto(s): "Home of the World's Largest Turkey", "Stingers up"
- Location of Frazee, Minnesota
- Coordinates: 46°43′40.85″N 95°42′3.16″W
- Country: United States
- State: Minnesota
- County: Becker
- Settled: 1870
- Platted: 1873
- Incorporated: January 6, 1891
- Named for: Randolph Lafayette Frazee

Government
  - Mayor: Mike Sharp
  - Councilmembers: Andrea Froeber; Mark Kemper; Andrew Daggett; Jim Rader

Area
  - City: 1.112 sq mi (2.880 km^{2})
  - Land: 1.073 sq mi (2.778 km^{2})
  - Water: 0.039 sq mi (0.102 km^{2})
- Elevation: 1,385 ft (422 m)

Population (2020)
  - City: 1,335
  - Estimate (2023): 1,308
  - Density: 1,220/sq mi (470.9/km^{2})
  - Metro: 35,283
- Time zone: UTC−6 (Central (CST))
  - Summer (DST): UTC−5 (CDT)
- ZIP Code: 56544
- Area code: 218
- FIPS code: 27-22472
- GNIS feature ID: 0643899
- Sales tax: 7.375%
- Website: frazeecity.com

Frazee (/freɪˈziː/ fray-ZEE) is a city in Becker County, Minnesota, United States. It is the second-most-populous city in Becker County. The population was 1,335 at the 2020 census.

== History ==
The community was originally named Detroit and later Third Crossing before adopting the name Frazee. With Becker County not formally organized until 1871, it was the earliest settlement in the area. The city was incorporated on January 6, 1891. It was named after Randolph Lafayette Frazee, owner of a sawmill.

Frazee was the birthplace of Kieth Engen, a noted operatic bass.

== Geography ==
According to the United States Census Bureau, the city has a total area of 1.110 square miles (2.87 km^{2}), of which 1.073 square miles (2.78 km^{2}) is land and 0.039 square miles (0.10 km^{2}) is water.

== Demographics ==
Historical population
Census	Pop.	Note	%±
1880	97		—
1900	1,000		—
1910	1,645		64.5%
1920	1,277		−22.4%
1930	1,041		−18.5%
1940	1,167		12.1%
1950	1,021		−12.5%
1960	1,083		6.1%
1970	1,015		−6.3%
1980	1,284		26.5%
1990	1,176		−8.4%
2000	1,377		17.1%
2010	1,350		−2.0%
2020	1,335		−1.1%
2023 (est.)	1,308		−2.0%
U.S. Decennial Census; 2020 Census

As of the 2023 American Community Survey, there are 640 estimated households in Frazee with an average of 2.4 persons per household. The city has a median household income of $49,000. Approximately 22.1% of the city's population lives at or below the poverty line. Frazee has an estimated 60.6% employment rate, with 9.5% of the population holding a bachelor's degree or higher and 85.1% holding a high school diploma.

The top five reported ancestries (people were allowed to report up to two ancestries, thus the figures will generally add to more than 100%) were English (97.8%), Spanish (0.0%), Indo-European (1.6%), Asian and Pacific Islander (0.5%), and Other (0.1%).

The median age in the city was 31.1 years.

=== 2020 census ===
Frazee, Minnesota – racial and ethnic composition Note: the US Census treats Hispanic/Latino as an ethnic category. This table excludes Latinos from the racial categories and assigns them to a separate category. Hispanics/Latinos may be of any race.
Race / ethnicity (NH = non-Hispanic)	Pop. 2000	Pop. 2010	Pop. 2020	% 2000	% 2010	% 2020
White alone (NH)	1,277	1,167	1,098	92.74%	86.44%	82.25%
Black or African American alone (NH)	9	18	30	0.65%	1.33%	2.25%
Native American or Alaska Native alone (NH)	41	69	66	2.98%	5.11%	4.94%
Asian alone (NH)	13	8	9	0.94%	0.59%	0.67%
Pacific Islander alone (NH)	0	0	0	0.00%	0.00%	0.00%
Other race alone (NH)	3	0	0	0.22%	0.00%	0.00%
Mixed race or multiracial (NH)	21	55	97	1.53%	4.07%	7.27%
Hispanic or Latino (any race)	13	33	35	0.94%	2.44%	2.62%
Total	1,377	1,350	1,335	100.00%	100.00%	100.00%

As of the 2020 census, there were 1,335 people, 543 households, and 327 families residing in the city. The population density was 1,244.2 inhabitants per square mile (480.4/km^{2}). There were 606 housing units at an average density of 564.8 per square mile (218.1/km^{2}). The racial makeup of the city was 83.07% White, 2.32% African American, 5.24% Native American, 0.67% Asian, 0.07% Pacific Islander, 0.67% from some other races and 7.94% from two or more races. Hispanic or Latino people of any race were 2.62% of the population.

=== 2010 census ===
As of the 2010 census, there were 1,350 people, 540 households, and 325 families residing in the city. The population density was 1,273.6 inhabitants per square mile (491.7/km^{2}). There were 595 housing units at an average density of 561.3 per square mile (216.7/km^{2}). The racial makeup of the city was 88.07% White, 1.56% African American, 5.11% Native American, 0.59% Asian, 0.00% Pacific Islander, 0.22% from some other races and 4.44% from two or more races. Hispanic or Latino people of any race were 2.44% of the population.

There were 540 households, of which 34.1% had children under the age of 18 living with them, 41.1% were married couples living together, 13.3% had a female householder with no husband present, 5.7% had a male householder with no wife present, and 39.8% were non-families. 34.1% of all households were made up of individuals, and 16.3% had someone living alone who was 65 years of age or older. The average household size was 2.39 and the average family size was 3.00.

The median age in the city was 36.7 years. 25.9% of residents were under the age of 18; 8.1% were between the ages of 18 and 24; 24.2% were from 25 to 44; 23.5% were from 45 to 64; and 18.5% were 65 years of age or older. The gender makeup of the city was 45.4% male and 54.6% female.

== Government ==
Frazee is governed by the Statutory City Plan A form of government (in Minnesota, 601 cities operate under Plan A). This plan removes the clerk from the council and replaces that position with a fourth (or sixth) elected council member. The city council appoints the clerk and treasurer to indefinite terms of office. A mayor and four council members are elected to three-year terms. The council meets on the second and fourth Wednesdays of each month at the Frazee Event Center.

== Business and industry ==
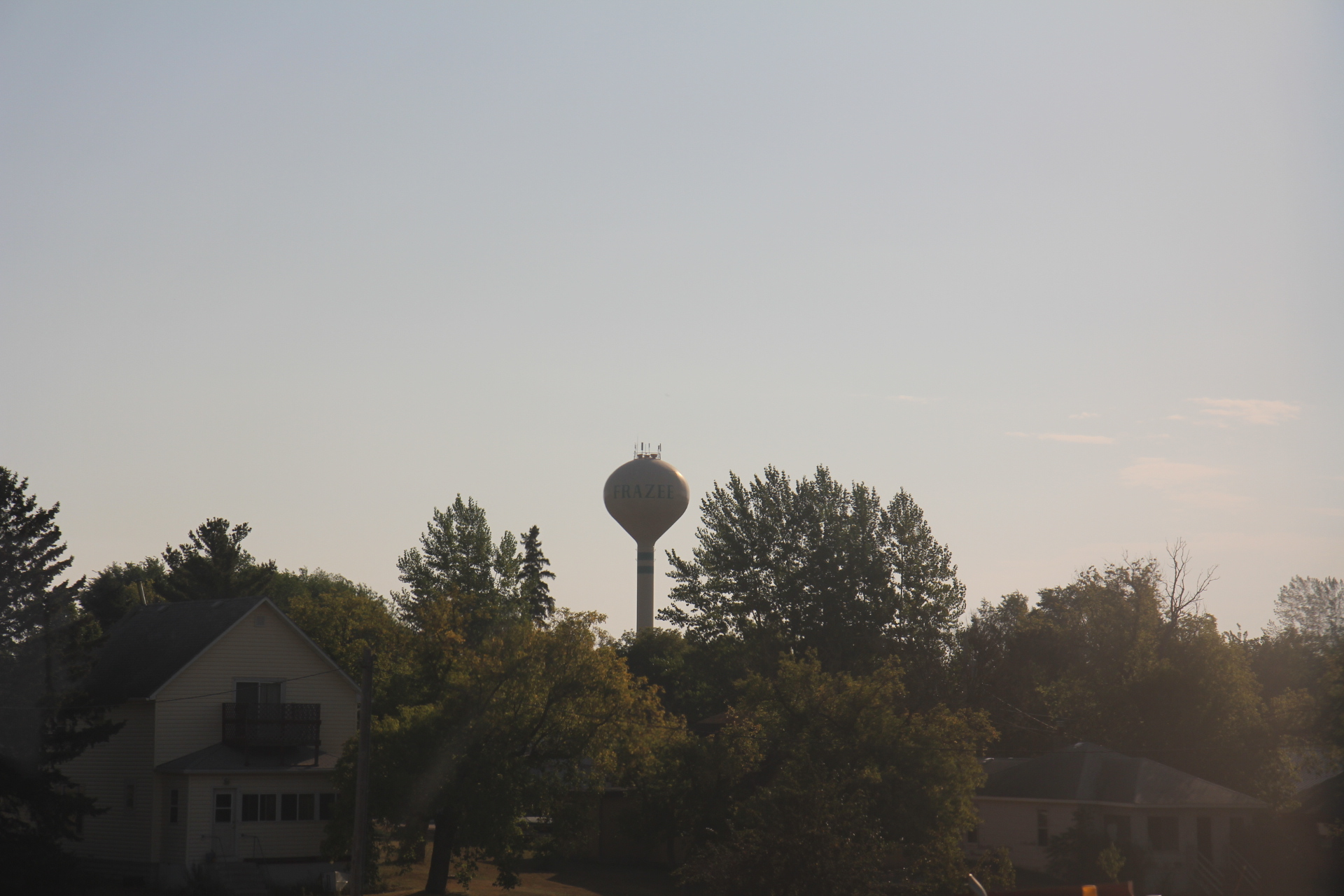
Water tower

Frazee's three largest employers are Frazee-Vergas Public Schools (160 employees), Frazee Care Center (160), and Daggett Truck Line (102). Daggett Truck Line has been operating for 80 years out of Frazee, carrying refrigerated and dry freight throughout the United States and southern Canada. It transports frozen foods, snack foods, pet food, produce, and manufactured goods. Its trucks return with processed foods or raw materials for local manufacturers.

== Transportation ==
Major roads are U.S. Route 10, a four-lane divided highway connecting the twin cities of Minneapolis-Saint Paul to the east and Fargo-Moorhead to the west; and Minnesota State Highway 87, a two-lane secondary road running east from the city.

Frazee is on the Northern Pacific Railway's former main line, now the Northern Transcon of the BNSF. In 2015, this line carried an average of 49 trains per day.

Amtrak's Empire Builder runs through town in each direction in the early morning; its closest station stop is Detroit Lakes, ten miles (16 km) away.

== Notable people ==
- Amber Estenson, social media influencer known as "That Midwestern Mom"

== The world's largest turkey ==
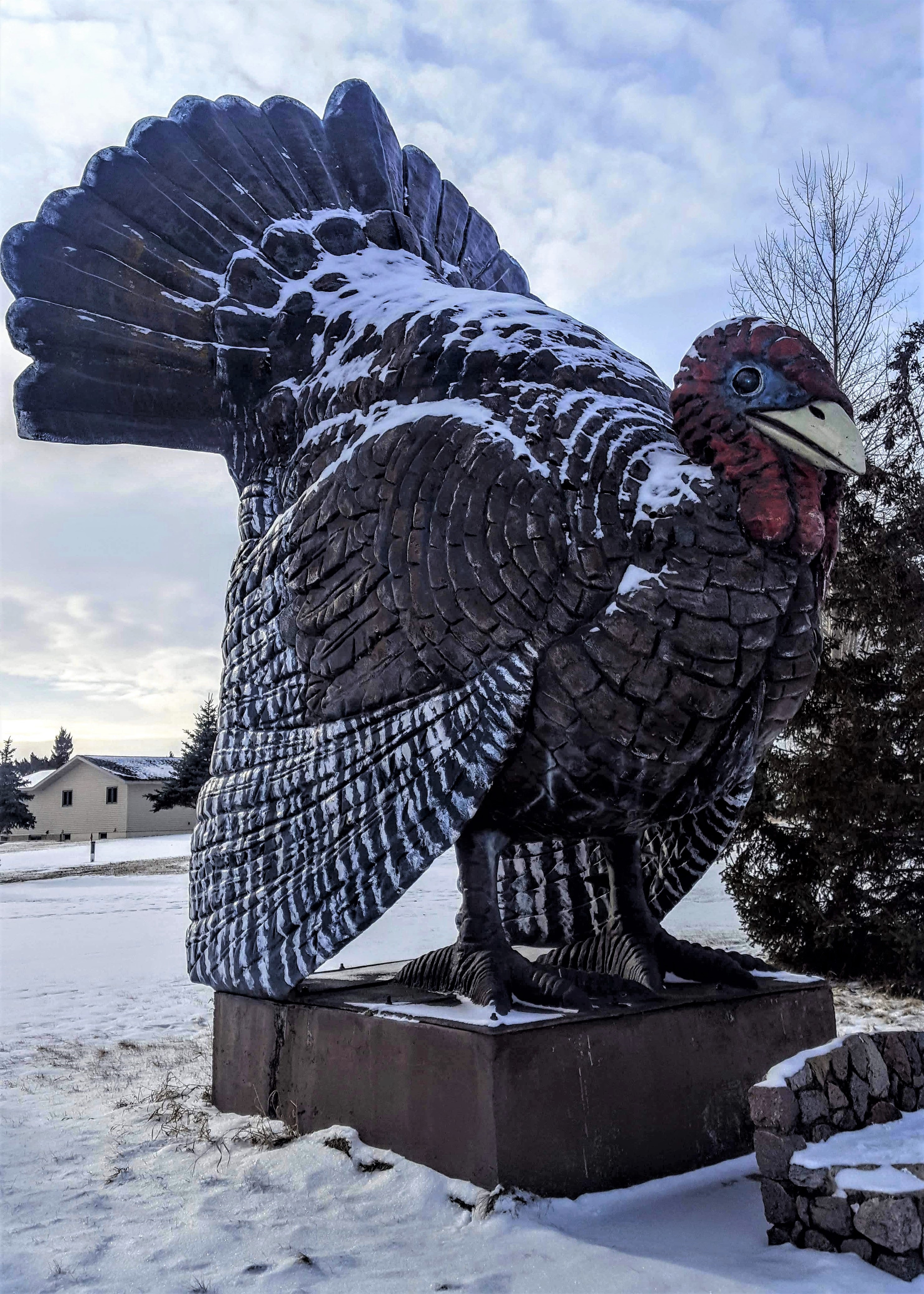
"Big Tom" in 2018

Frazee is best known as the home of Big Tom: the World's Largest Turkey. Frazee has long been part of the turkey industry. In 1984, turkey growers and committee members put up a giant turkey statue to honor the town. For $20,000, the group commissioned artist Shell Scott to construct the statue, which was built on a metal frame and covered in cement, fiberglass, cardboard, and insulation. The statue, named "Big Tom", was finished in 1986 and stood 22 feet (6.7 m) tall, earning Frazee the title "Home of the world's largest turkey."

Due to Big Tom's physical makeup, the statue needed frequent repairs. There were also complaints that Big Tom was not proportioned like a real turkey. The area committee decided it needed a new Big Tom and commissioned artist Dave Oswald. On July 1, 1998, during the removing process for Big Tom, the statue caught fire from a cutting torch that was being used to remove the wings.

On September 19, 1998, a new statue arrived in Frazee in three pieces on a flatbed trailer. The new "Big Tom" took eight hours to assemble, standing over 20 feet (6.1 m) tall and 17 feet (5.2 m) wide. It weighs over 5,000 pounds, having 1,000 pounds of steel reinforcement. It has 3,000 to 4,000 separate fiberglass feathers, which took the D.W.O. Fiberglass Company over 2,000 hours to make.
