= Snickers salad =

Snickers, apples, and whipped cream

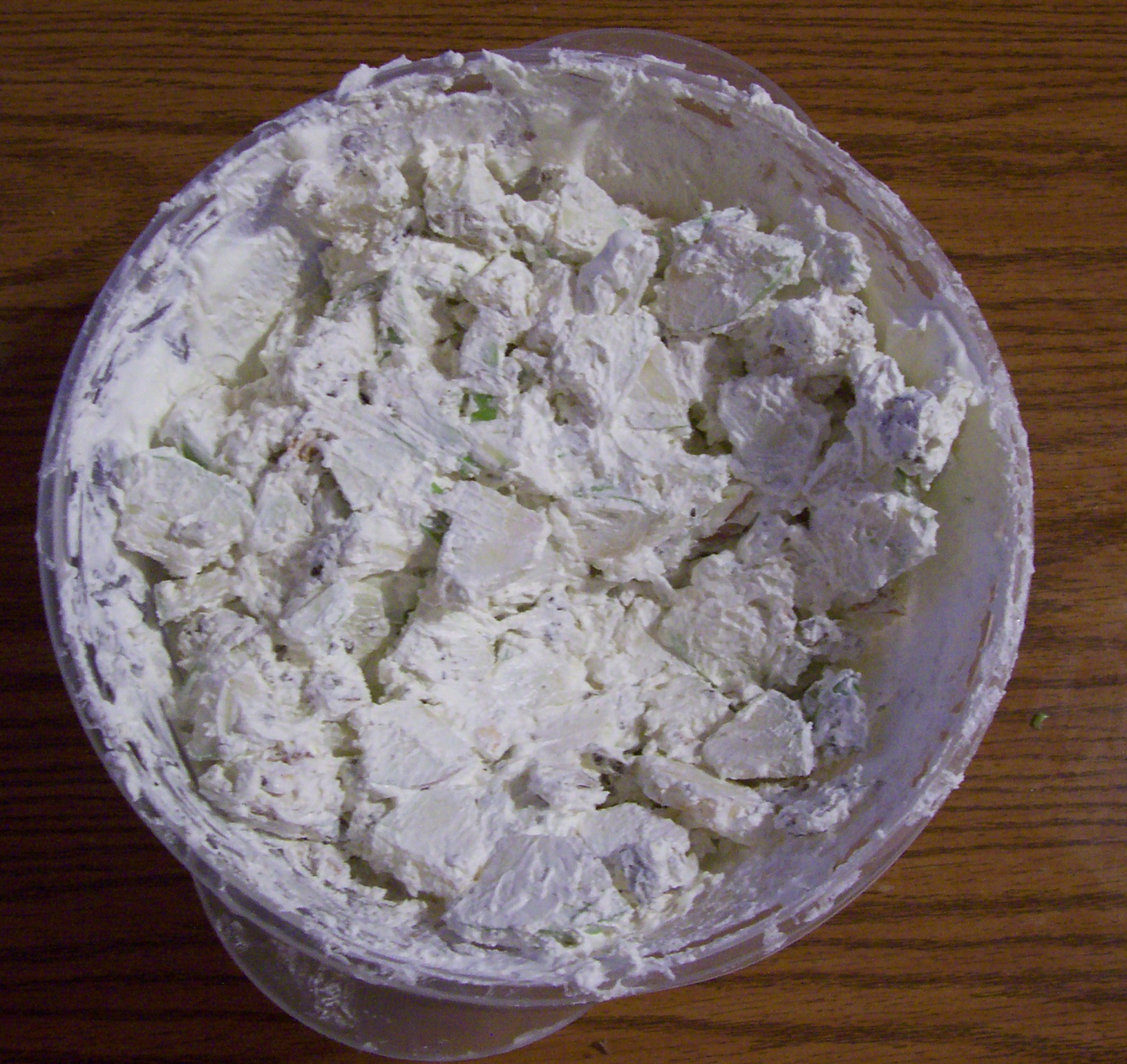
- A completed Snickers salad
- Course: Salad
- Place of origin: United States
- Region or state: Upper Midwest
- Serving temperature: Cold
- Main ingredients: Snickers bars, Granny Smith apples, whipped topping, marshmallows

Snickers salad is a dessert salad consisting of a mix of Snickers bars, Granny Smith apples, Cool Whip or whipped topping, marshmallows, and often pudding served in a bowl. It is a staple of potlucks in Iowa. It is sometimes included in church cookbooks.

Snickers salad is easy to make; the ingredients are simply chopped and combined. As to whether it is a salad or a dessert, popular lore has it that it depends on which end of the table it is sitting at.

It has a rather unique texture, being sticky and crunchy. Clumps are known to get stuck in the teeth. This feature makes the experience of eating it divisive.

The recipe for Snickers salad was included in a 2009 article "Salads worthy of a church picnic" in The Indianapolis Star. The author said that "Despite what all my community and church cookbooks would say, I don't think anything with marshmallows can really be called a salad."

Amber Estenson is known for, among other things, her videos of making a Snickers salad.

== See also ==
- Chocolate salo
- List of salads
