= Doumak =

Manufacturer of marshmallows

Doumak Inc.
- Founded: 1961; 65 years ago
- Founder: Alex Doumak
- Headquarters: Elk Grove Village, Illinois, United States
- Products: Marshmallows
- Revenue: 50 million USD (2005)
- Owner: Doumak family
- Number of employees: 160
- Website: www.doumak.com

Doumak Inc. is a company based in Illinois, US, founded in 1961 by Alex Doumak. The company produces marshmallows and holds a patent for the extrusion process by which they are manufactured. As of 2005, Doumak Inc.'s revenue is US$50 million.

Doumak Inc. began its marshmallow-making journey in 1921, producing cast mold marshmallows in Los Angeles, California. In 1954, Alex Doumakes invented and patented the extrusion process of manufacturing marshmallows. This breakthrough innovation allowed the mass production of marshmallows in a cost-efficient manner. Marshmallows went from being an expensive confection to an everyday sweet treat and favorite ingredient for many recipes. In 1961, the Doumak family moved the company to its current location outside Chicago, Illinois. In 2003, Doumak acquired the Campfire brand and opened its second manufacturing facility in the Chicago area.
