= Pistachio pudding =

Pudding made with pistachio nuts

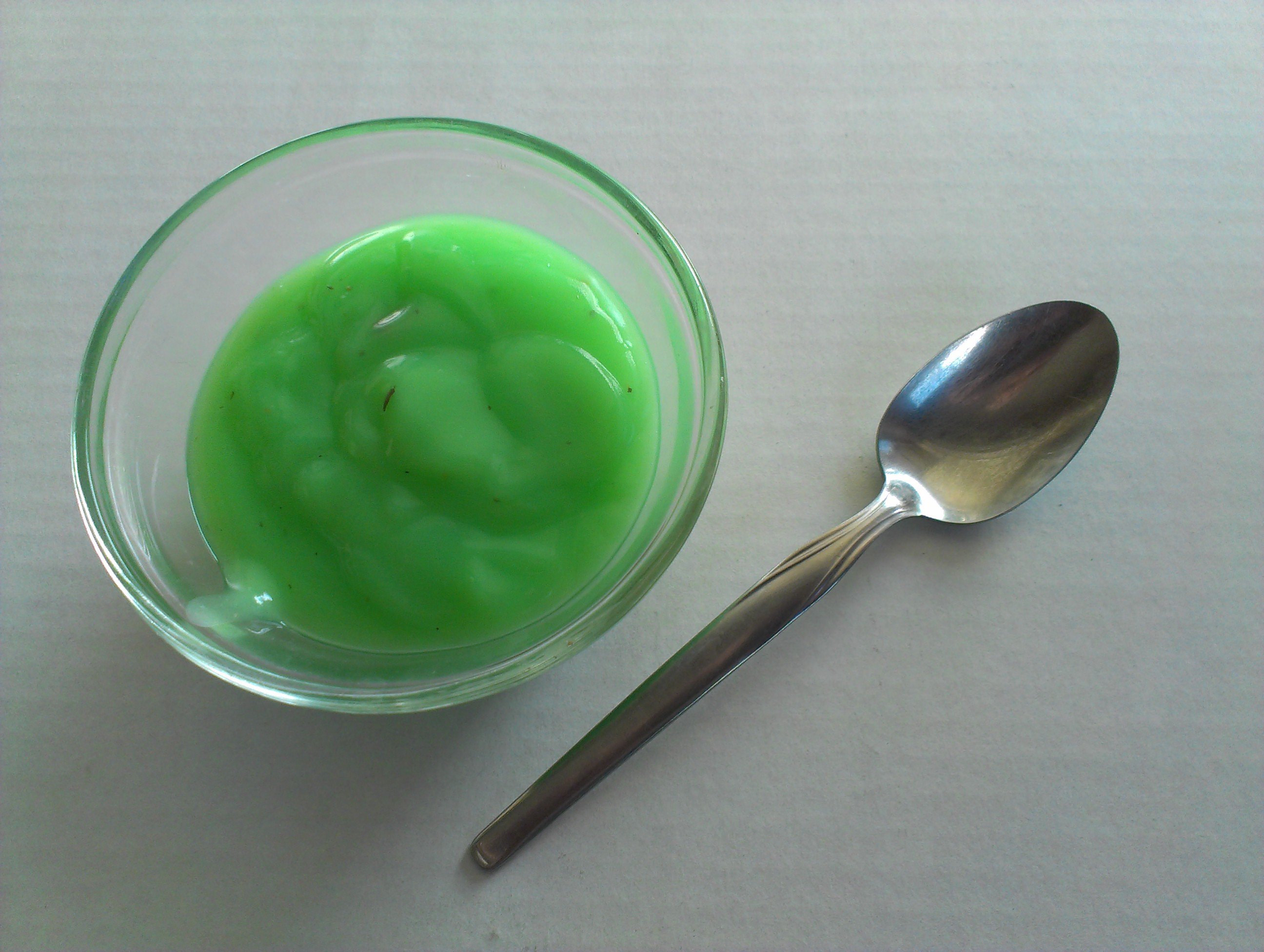
- Type: Pudding
- Main ingredients: Pistachio nuts

Pistachio pudding is a green pudding made from pistachio nuts and occasionally contains small chunks of almonds. Jell-O also sells boxed pistachio pudding mix. Boxed pistachio pudding was developed by Kraft Foods in 1975. Pistachio pudding quickly became a staple ingredient in Watergate salad. This pudding is also an ingredient in certain types of cakes, pies, muffins, pastries, and pistachio salad.
