= Watergate salad =

American dessert salad dish

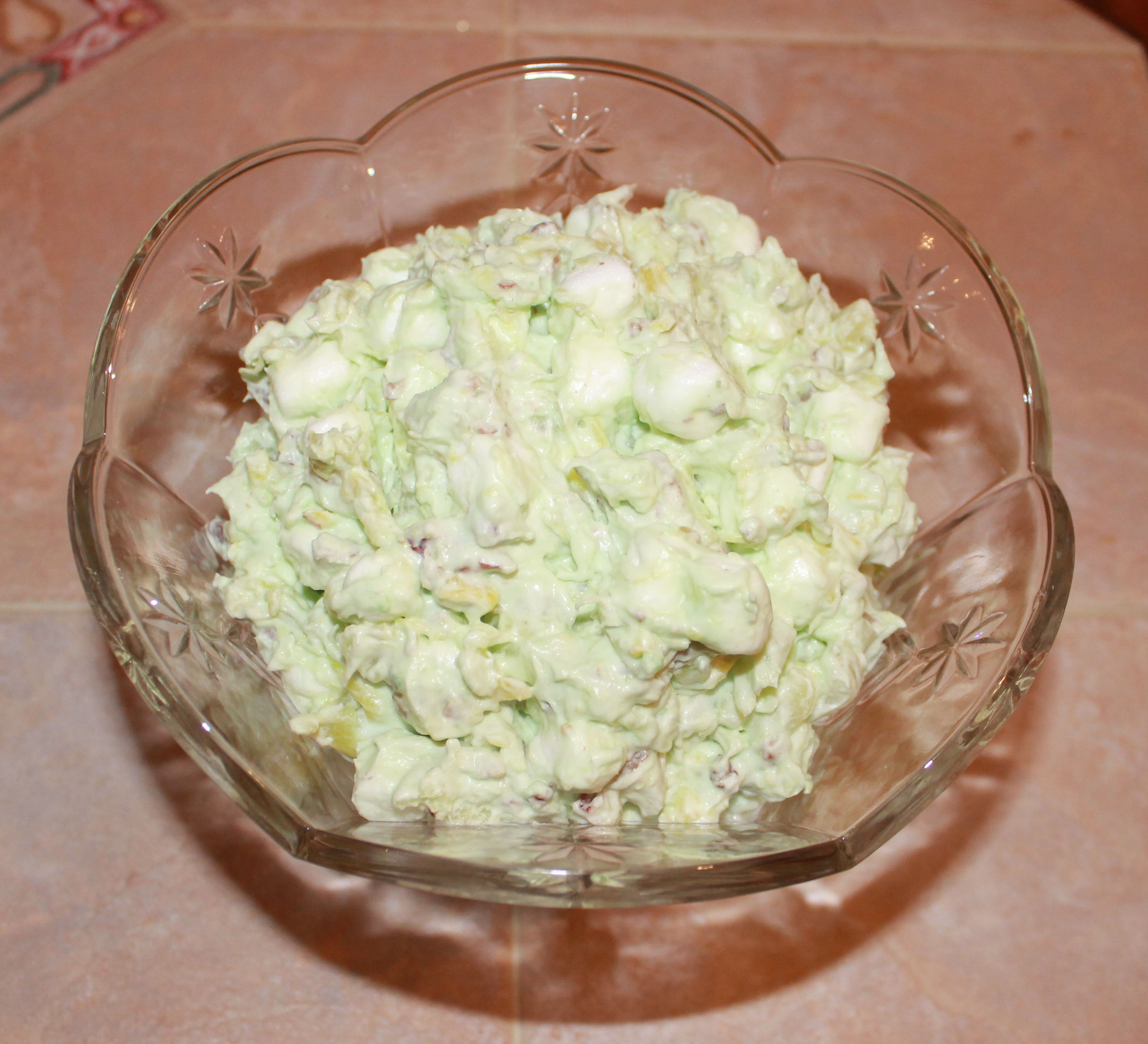
- Alternative names: Pistachio Delight, Shut The Gate Salad, Green Goop, Green Goddess, Green Fluff, Green Stuff, Mean Green, Shamrock Salad
- Type: Dessert
- Place of origin: United States
- Main ingredients: Pistachio pudding, canned pineapple, Cool Whip, marshmallows

Watergate salad, also referred to as Pistachio Delight or Shut the Gate salad, is a side dish salad or dessert salad made from pistachio pudding, canned pineapple, whipped topping, crushed walnuts or pecans, and marshmallows. The ingredients are combined and then often chilled. It is a popular dish in areas of the U.S. where potlucks are common.

== History ==
The origin of the name "Watergate salad" is obscure.

In 1922 Helen Keller published a similar recipe, calling for canned diced pineapple, nuts, marshmallows, whipped cream and other ingredients. "I ate it first in California, so I call it Golden Gate Salad".

The dish was in the news by March 1973, when it was "said to be catching on." As of May 1973, a newspaper in Daly City noted that "those waitresses at the new Emeryville Holiday Inn (East Bay) are getting tired of hearing about 'bugs' in their house special — the Watergate Salad. The salad was named in honor of the adjoining apartment development, not the You-Know-What thing."

Syndicated household advice columnists Anne Adams and Nan Nash-Cummings, in their "Anne & Nan" column of October 9, 1997, reported that name came from the similar "Watergate Cake" (which shares most of the same ingredients): "The recipes came out during the Watergate scandal. The cake has a 'cover-up' icing and is full of nuts. The salad is also full of nuts." Both cake and salad were part of a trend for satirically named recipes such as Nixon's Perfectly Clear Consommé and Liddy's Clam-Up Chowder.

=== Kraft recipe publication in 1975 ===
The recipe was published by General Foods (since merged into what is now Kraft Heinz) and called for two General Foods products: Jell-O instant pistachio pudding and Cool Whip whipped topping, a whipped-cream substitute. According to Kraft, "There are several urban myths regarding the name change, but we can't substantiate any of them." Several competing explanations exist.

Kraft Corporate Affairs said: "We developed the recipe for Pistachio Pineapple Delight. It was in 1975, the same year that pistachio pudding mix came out." Kraft, however, did not refer to it as Watergate Salad until consumers started requesting the recipe for it under the name. "According to Kraft Kitchens, when the recipe for Pistachio Pineapple Delight was sent out, an unnamed Chicago food editor renamed it Watergate Salad to promote interest in the recipe when she printed it in her column." Neither the article nor editor has been tracked down, however.

=== Modern ===
Amber Estenson first went viral for a Watergate salad recipe.

== Other names ==
Watergate salad is also referred to as Pistachio Delight or Shut the Gate salad, or colloquially as Green Goop, Green Goddess salad, Green Fluff, or Green Stuff.

== See also ==
- List of salads
