= Amber Estenson =

American social media influencer

- Born: Frazee, Minnesota
- Other name: That Midwestern Mom
- Education: Peabody Conservatory, University of Maryland
- Known for: Social media influencer

Amber Estenson Schwarzrock is an American social media influencer and opera singer best known for her social media content, which is posted under the name That Midwestern Mom and celebrates and parodies the culture of Minnesota. Her best-known content features dessert salads, which she calls "Minnesota salads that aren't really salads".

== Biography ==
Schwarzrock hails from Frazee, Minnesota, near Detroit Lakes. She attended Detroit Lakes High School, and has stated that she went on to attend Westminster Choir College, which she attended in 2001. She also studied abroad, including in Costa Rica. She earned her bachelors' degree in opera singing from the Johns Hopkins University and also attended the University of Maryland for opera singing. She went on to be a professional opera singer, before becoming a music teacher at Frazee Elementary School. She moved back to the Detroit Lakes area around 2016.

She first went viral on social media for a pistachio fluff salad recipe she made on Saint Patrick's Day 2021, which had more than thirty thousand likes. After the video and a subsequent video also about a "Minnesota salad" went viral, her mother convinced her to create the "That Midwestern Mom" persona, based on her mother and featuring hair in curlers; another viral video was of her walking in a grocery store with curlers in. In 2022, she sang the national anthem for a Minnesota Twins game; at around the same time, she noted that she began getting constantly recognized, including before singing the anthem and at Pride.

She became more viral after Minnesota Public Radio did an article on her, and views continued to accumulate. Most of her following is within Minnesota: as of 2023, around 30% of her followers hail from the Twin cities. She is best known for her series of videos on "Minnesota salads that aren't really salads", or dessert salads, including such recipes as Snickers salad and Raspberry Pretzel Salad. A "crazy eyes" expression she makes in her videos became a viral meme. Videos also included other cultural behaviors. She quit her day job in 2023. She has advertised for organizations including the Northeast Bean Growers Association.

In 2024, she went further viral for making the recipes of then-Governor of Minnesota and vice presidential nominee Tim Walz.

In 2026, she and her child were plaintiffs in an ACLU case against Detroit Lakes Public Schools, who had banned rainbow flags and rainbow stickers from schools. The policy was ultimately rescinded after she spoke at a meeting of the school board, stating the ban meant "families now feel unwelcome in our own schools" and that the decision directly impacted her family.

Also in 2026, she debuted her own talk show, which records live.

== Personal life ==
At age 40, she was diagnosed with attention deficit hyperactivity disorder and dyslexia. She has a fiance who is also a music teacher and has created content about visiting him in Saudi Arabia.
