= Ambrosia (fruit salad) =

American dish

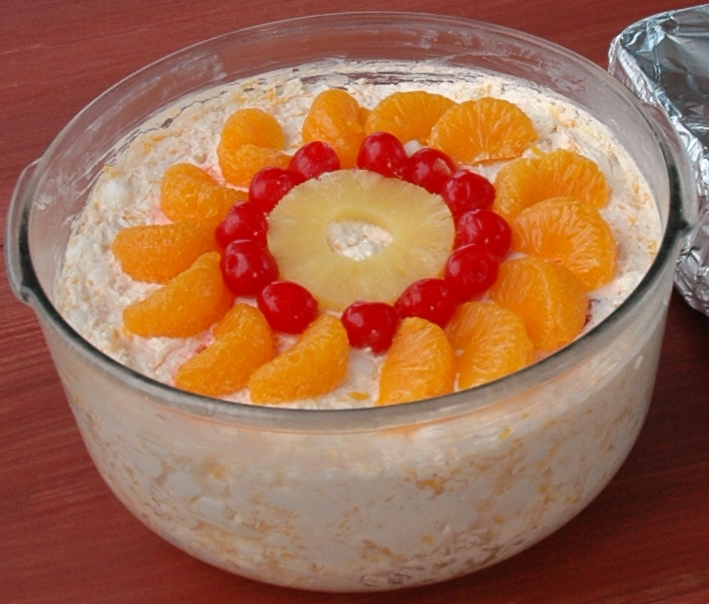
- An ambrosia salad prepared for a potluck, topped with canned mandarin orange slices, maraschino cherries, and a canned pineapple ring
- Alternative names: 5 cup salad
- Place of origin: United States
- Region or state: Southern United States
- Main ingredients: Pineapple, mandarin oranges, marshmallows, and coconut

Ambrosia also known as ambrosia salad is a North American variety of fruit salad originating in the Southern United States. Most ambrosia recipes contain canned (often sweetened) or fresh pineapple, canned mandarin orange slices or fresh orange sections, miniature marshmallows, and coconut. Other ingredients might include various fruits and nuts: maraschino cherries, bananas, strawberries, peeled grapes, or crushed pecans. Ambrosia can also include mayonnaise or dairy ingredients: whipped cream (or whipped topping), sour cream, cream cheese, pudding, yogurt, or cottage cheese.

The mixture of ingredients is refrigerated for a few hours or overnight before serving to allow the flavors to meld.

The earliest known mention of the salad is in the 1867 cookbook Dixie Cookery by Maria Massey Barringer. The name references the food of the Greek gods.

== See also ==
- Jello salad
- List of salads
