= Marshmallow =

Sugar-based confection

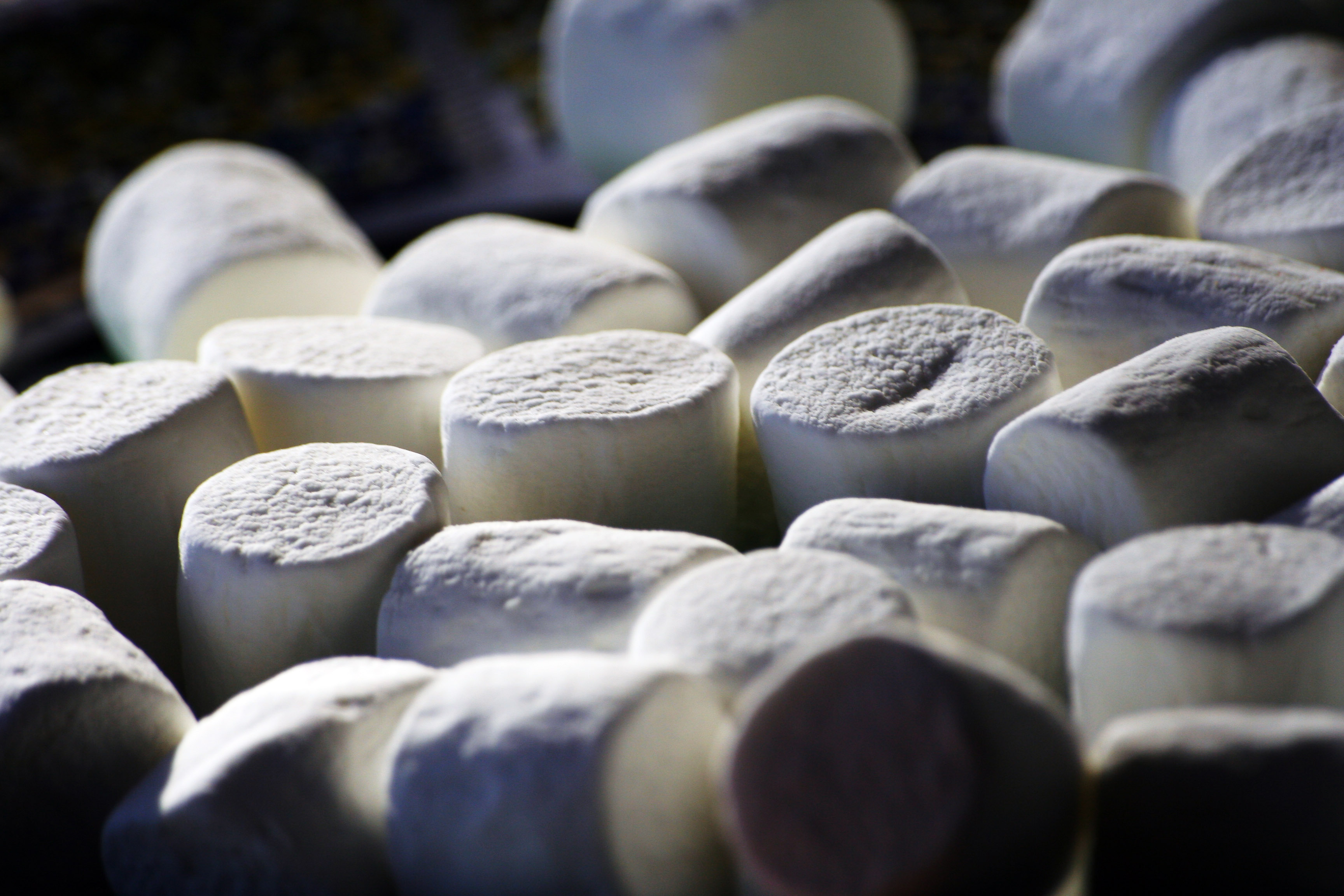
- Type: Confectionery
- Place of origin: France
- Main ingredients: Sugar, gelatin, water, and air
- Variations: Food coloring, sprinkles

Marshmallow (UK: /ˌmɑːrʃˈmæloʊ/, US: /ˈmɑːrʃˌmɛloʊ, -mæl-/) is a confection made from sugar, water and gelatin whipped to a solid-but-soft consistency. It is used as a filling in baking or molded into shapes and coated with corn starch. This sugar confection is inspired by a medicinal confection made from Althaea officinalis, the marsh-mallow plant.

== History ==
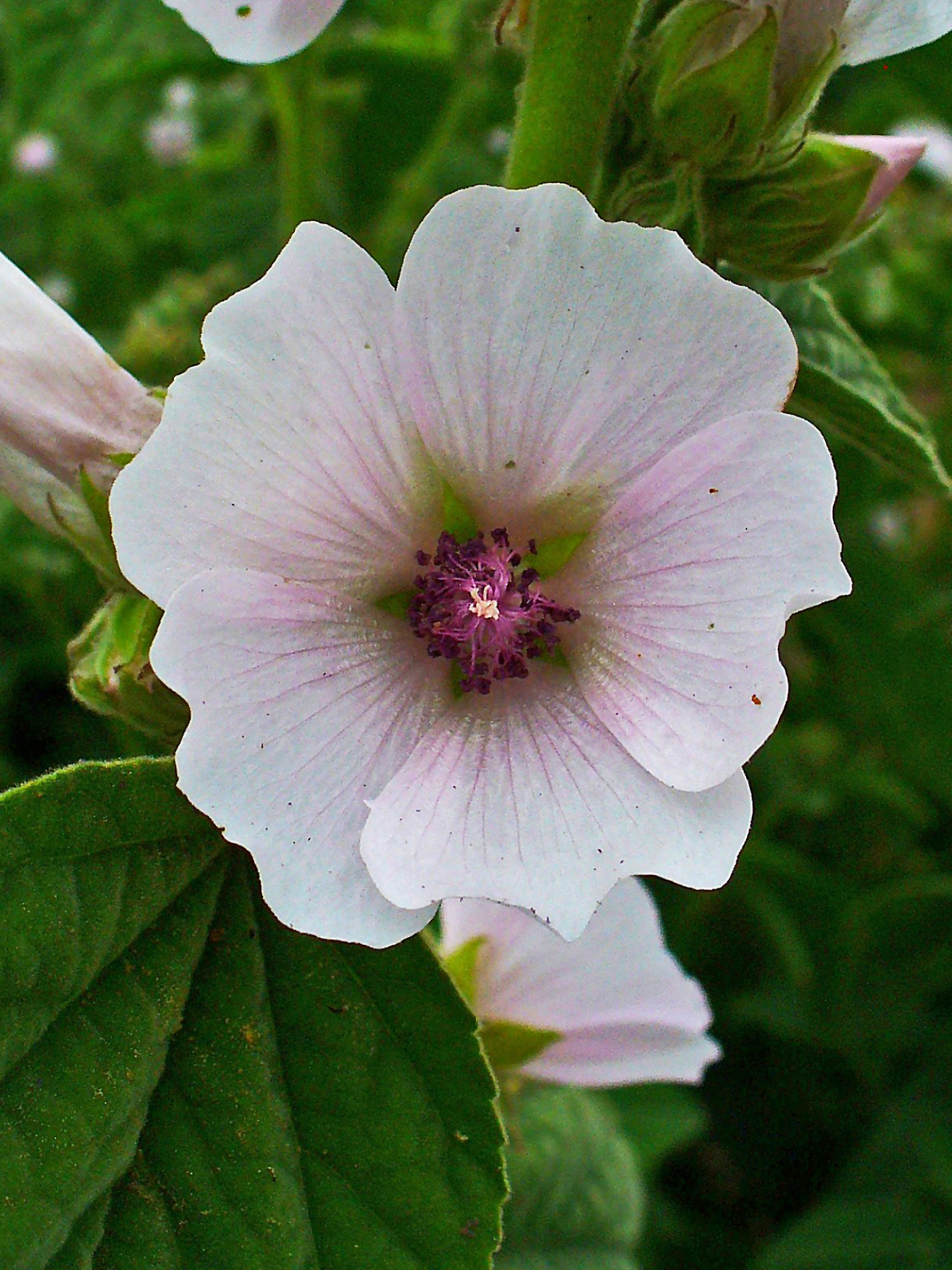
The marsh-mallow plant (Althaea officinalis)

The word "marshmallow" comes from the mallow plant species (Althaea officinalis), a wetland weed native to parts of Europe, North Africa, and Asia that grows in marshes and other damp areas. The plant's stem and leaves are fleshy, and its white flower has five petals. It is not known exactly when marshmallows were invented, but their history goes back as early as 2000 BCE. Ancient Egyptians were said to be the first to make use of the root of the plant to soothe coughs and sore throats and to heal wounds. The first marshmallows were prepared by boiling pieces of root pulp with honey until thick. Once thickened, the mixture was strained, cooled, then used as intended.

Whether used for candy or medicine, the manufacture of marshmallows was limited to a small scale. In the early to mid-19th century, the marshmallow had made its way to France, where confectioners augmented the plant's traditional medicinal value. Owners of small confectionery stores would whip the sap from the mallow root into a fluffy candy mold. This candy, called Pâte de Guimauve, was a spongy-soft dessert made from whipping dried marshmallow roots with sugar, water, and egg whites. It was sold in bar form as a lozenge. Drying and preparation of the marshmallow took one to two days before the final product was produced. In the late 19th century, candy makers started looking for a new process and discovered the starch mogul system, in which trays of modified corn starch had a mold firmly pushed down in them to create cavities within the starch. The cavities were then filled with the whipped marshmallow sap mixture and allowed to cool or harden. At the same time, candy makers began to replace the mallow root with gelatin, which created a stable form of marshmallow.

By the early 20th century, thanks to the starch mogul system, marshmallows were available for mass consumption. In the United States, they were sold in tins as penny candy and used in a variety of food recipes like banana fluff, lime mallow sponge, and tutti frutti. They also became a popular garnish for hot chocolate and dishes including candied sweet potatoes. In 1956, Alex Doumak patented the extrusion process that involved running marshmallow ingredients through tubes. The tubes created a long rope of marshmallow mixture and were then set out to cool. The ingredients were then cut into equal pieces and packaged.

Modern marshmallow manufacturing is highly automated and has been since the early 1950s, when the extrusion process was first developed. Numerous improvements and advancements allow for the production of thousands of pounds of marshmallow a day.

== Ingredients ==
Marshmallows consist of four ingredients: sugar, water, air, and a whipping agent/aerator (usually a protein). The types of sugar and whipping agent vary depending on the desired characteristics. Each ingredient plays a specific role in the final product.

The marshmallow is a foam, consisting of an aqueous continuous phase and a gaseous dispersed phase; in other words, a liquid with gas bubbles spread throughout. Marshmallows are an "aerated" confection because the material is made up of 50% air. The goal of an aerated confection like a marshmallow is to incorporate gas into a sugar mixture and stabilize the aerated product before the gas can escape.

=== Protein ===
In marshmallows, proteins are the main surface-active agents responsible for the formation and stabilization of the dispersed air. Due to their structure, surface-active molecules gather at the surface area of a portion of (water-based) liquid. A portion of each protein molecule is hydrophilic, with a polar charge, and another portion is hydrophobic and non-polar. The non-polar section has little or no affinity for water, and so this section orients as far away from the water as possible. However, the polar section is attracted to the water and has little or no affinity for the air. Therefore, the molecule orients with the polar section in the water, with the non-polar section in the air. Two primary proteins that are commonly used as aerators in marshmallows are albumen (egg whites) and gelatin.

==== Albumen (egg whites) ====
Albumen is a mixture of proteins found in egg whites and is utilized for its capacity to create foams. In a commercialized setting, dried albumen is used as opposed to fresh egg whites. In addition to convenience, the advantages of using dried albumen are an increase in food safety and the reduction of water content in the marshmallow. Fresh egg whites carry a higher risk of Salmonella, and are approximately 90 percent water. This is undesirable for the shelf life and firmness of the product. For artisan-type marshmallows, prepared by a candy maker, fresh egg whites are usually used. Albumen is rarely used on its own when incorporated into modern marshmallows, and instead is used in conjunction with gelatin.

==== Gelatin ====
Gelatin is the aerator most often used in the production of marshmallows. It is made up of collagen, a structural protein derived from animal skin, connective tissue, and bones. Not only can it stabilize foams, like albumen, but when combined with water, it forms a thermally-reversible gel. This means that gelatin can melt, then reset due to its temperature sensitivity. The melting point of gelatin gel is around 95 °F (35 °C), which is just below normal body temperature (around 97 °F (36 °C)). This is what contributes to the "melt-in-your-mouth" sensation when a marshmallow is consumed—it actually starts to melt when it touches the tongue.

During preparation, the temperature needs to be just above the melting point of the gelatin, so that as soon as it is formed, it cools quickly, and the gelatin sets, retaining the desired shape. If the marshmallow rope mixture exiting the extruder during processing is too warm, the marshmallow starts to flow before the gelatin sets. Instead of a round marshmallow, it takes on an oval form. Excessive heat can also degrade or break down the gelatin itself. Therefore, when marshmallows are being produced at home or by artisan candy makers, the gelatin is added after the syrup has been heated and cooled down.

In commercial operations, the gelatin is cooked with the sugar syrup, rather than being added later after the syrup has cooled. In this case, kinetics play an important role, with both time and temperature factoring in. If the gelatin was added at the beginning of a batch that was then cooked to 112–116 °C in 20–30 minutes, a significant amount of gelatin would break down. The marshmallow would have reduced springiness from that loss of gelatin. But since the time the syrup spends at elevated temperature in modern cookers is so short, there is little to no degradation of the gelatin.

In terms of texture and mouth-feel, gelatin makes marshmallows chewy by forming a tangled 3-D network of polymer chains. Once gelatin is dissolved in warm water (dubbed the "blooming stage"), it forms a dispersion, which results in a cross-linking of its helix-shaped chains. The linkages in the gelatin protein network trap air in the marshmallow mixture and immobilize the water molecules in the network. The result is the well-known spongy structure of marshmallows. This is why the omission of gelatin from a marshmallow recipe results in marshmallow creme, since there is no gelatin network to trap the water and air bubbles.

=== Sugars ===
A traditional marshmallow might contain about 60% corn syrup, 30% sugar, and 1–2% gelatin. A combination of different sugars is used to control the solubility of the solution. The corn syrup/sugar ratio influences the texture by slowing crystallization of the sucrose. The smooth texture of marshmallows relies on disordered, or amorphous, sugar molecules. In contrast, increasing the sugar ratio to about 60–65% produces a grainy marshmallow. Temperature also plays an important role in producing smooth marshmallows by reducing the time window for ordered crystals to form. To ensure the sugars are disordered, the sugar syrup solution is heated to a high temperature and then cooled rapidly.

==== Sugarcane and sugar beet ====
Sugarcane and sugar beet are the two primary sources of sugar, consisting of sucrose molecules. Sucrose is a disaccharide that consists of one glucose and fructose molecule. This sugar provides sweetness and bulk to the marshmallow while simultaneously setting the foam to a firm consistency as it cools. Sucrose, and sugars in general, impair the ability of a foam to form, but improve foam stability. Therefore, sucrose is used in conjunction with a protein like gelatin. The protein can adsorb, unfold, and form a stable network, while the sugar can increase the viscosity. Liquid drainage of the continuous phase must be minimized as well. Thick liquids drain more slowly than thin ones, and so increasing the viscosity of the continuous phase reduces drainage. A high viscosity is essential if a stable foam is to be produced. Therefore, sucrose is a main component of marshmallow. But sucrose is seldom used on its own because it tends to crystallize.

==== Corn syrup ====
Corn syrup, derived from maize, contains glucose, maltose, and other oligosaccharides. Corn syrup can be obtained from the partial hydrolysis of cornstarch. Corn syrup is important in the production of marshmallow because it prevents the crystallization of other sugars (like sucrose). It may also contribute body, reduce sweetness, and alter flavor release, depending on the Dextrose Equivalent (DE) of the glucose syrup used.

The DE is the measure of the amount of reducing sugars present in a sugar product in relation to glucose. Lower-DE glucose syrups provide a chewier texture, while higher-DE syrups make the product more tender. In addition, depending on the type of DE used, can alter the sweetness, hygroscopicity, and browning of the marshmallow. Corn syrup is flavorless and cheap to produce, which is why candy companies love using this product.

==== Invert sugar ====
Invert sugar is produced when sucrose breaks down due to the addition of water, also known as hydrolysis. This molecule exhibits all the characteristics of honey except the flavor because it is the primary sugar found in honey. This means that invert sugar has the ability to prevent crystallization and produce a tender marshmallow. It is also an effective humectant, allowing it to trap water and prevent the marshmallow from drying out. For some candies, this is not a good trait to have, but for marshmallows, it is an advantage since it has a high moisture content.

==== Fruit syrups ====
While not widely used for traditional or commercial recipes, fruit syrups have been proposed as an alternative sugar for marshmallows.

=== Additional ingredients ===
==== Flavors ====
Unless a variation of the standard marshmallow is being made, vanilla is always used as the flavoring. The vanilla can either be added in extract form or by infusing the vanilla beans in the sugar syrup during cooking. The latter is the best technique to get an even distribution of flavor throughout the marshmallow.

==== Acids ====
Acids, such as cream of tartar or lemon juice, may also be used to increase foam stability. The addition of acid decreases the pH. This reduces the charge on the protein molecules and brings them closer to their isoelectric point. This results in a stronger, more stable interfacial film. When added to egg whites, acid prevents excessive aggregation at the interface. However, acid delays foam formation. It may therefore be added toward the end of the whipping process after a stable foam has been created.

== Manufacturing process ==
Video of making marshmallows

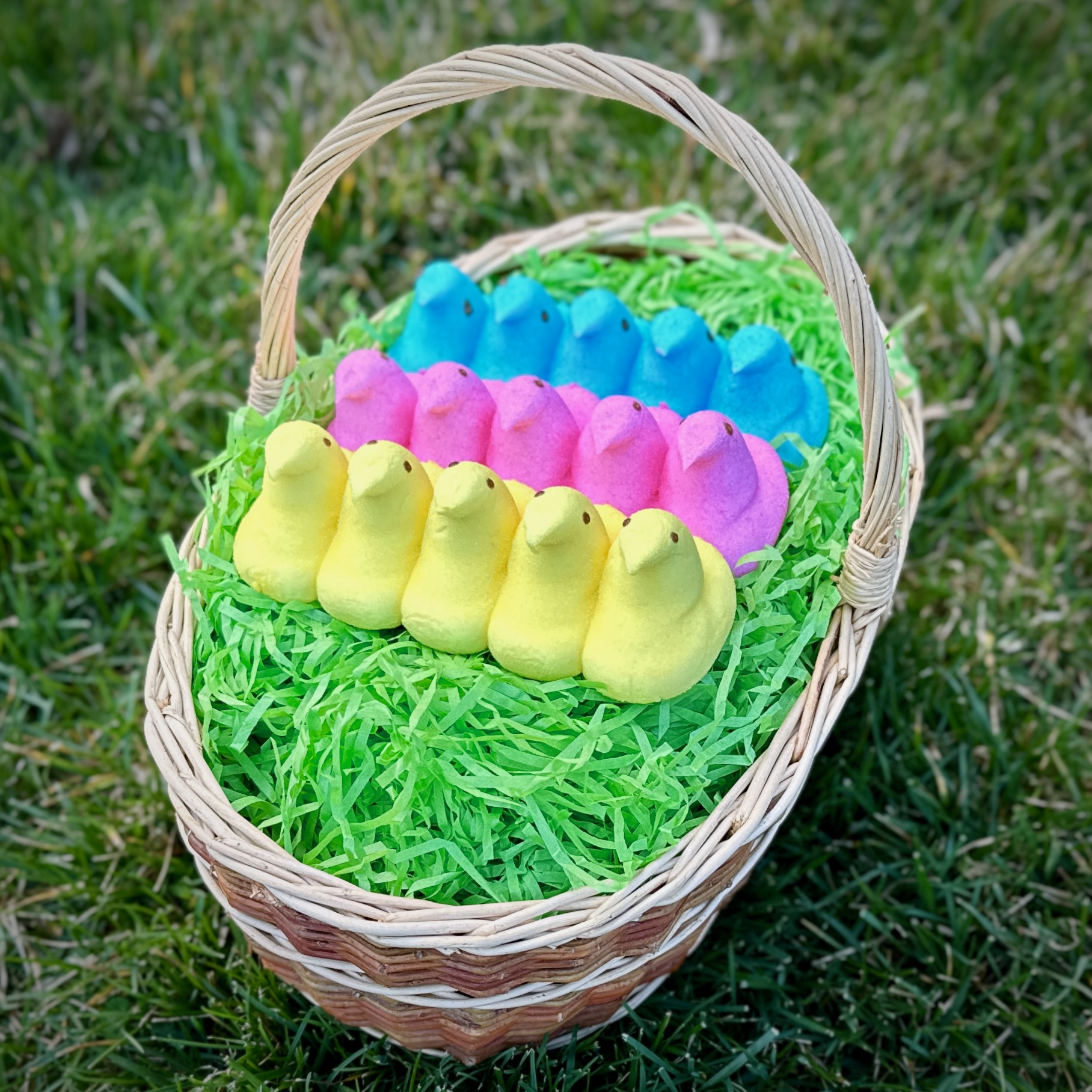
Just Born Peeps in an Easter basket

=== Commercial process ===
In commercial marshmallow manufacture, the entire process is streamlined and fully automated.

Gelatin is cooked with sugar and syrup. After the gelatin-containing syrup is cooked, it is allowed to cool slightly before air is incorporated. Whipping is generally accomplished in a rotor-stator type device. Compressed air is injected into the warm syrup, held at a temperature just above the melting point of gelatin. In a marshmallow aerator, pins on a rotating cylinder (rotor) intermesh with stationary pins on the wall (stator) provide the shear forces necessary to break the large injected air bubbles into numerous tiny bubbles that provide the smooth, fine-grained texture of the marshmallow. A continuous stream of light, fluffy marshmallow exits the aerator en route to the forming step.

The marshmallow confection is typically formed in one of three ways. First, it can be extruded in the desired shape and cut into pieces, as done for Jet-Puffed Marshmallows. Second, it can be deposited onto a belt, as done for Peeps. Third, it can be deposited into a starch-based mold in a mogul to make various shapes.

=== Home making process ===
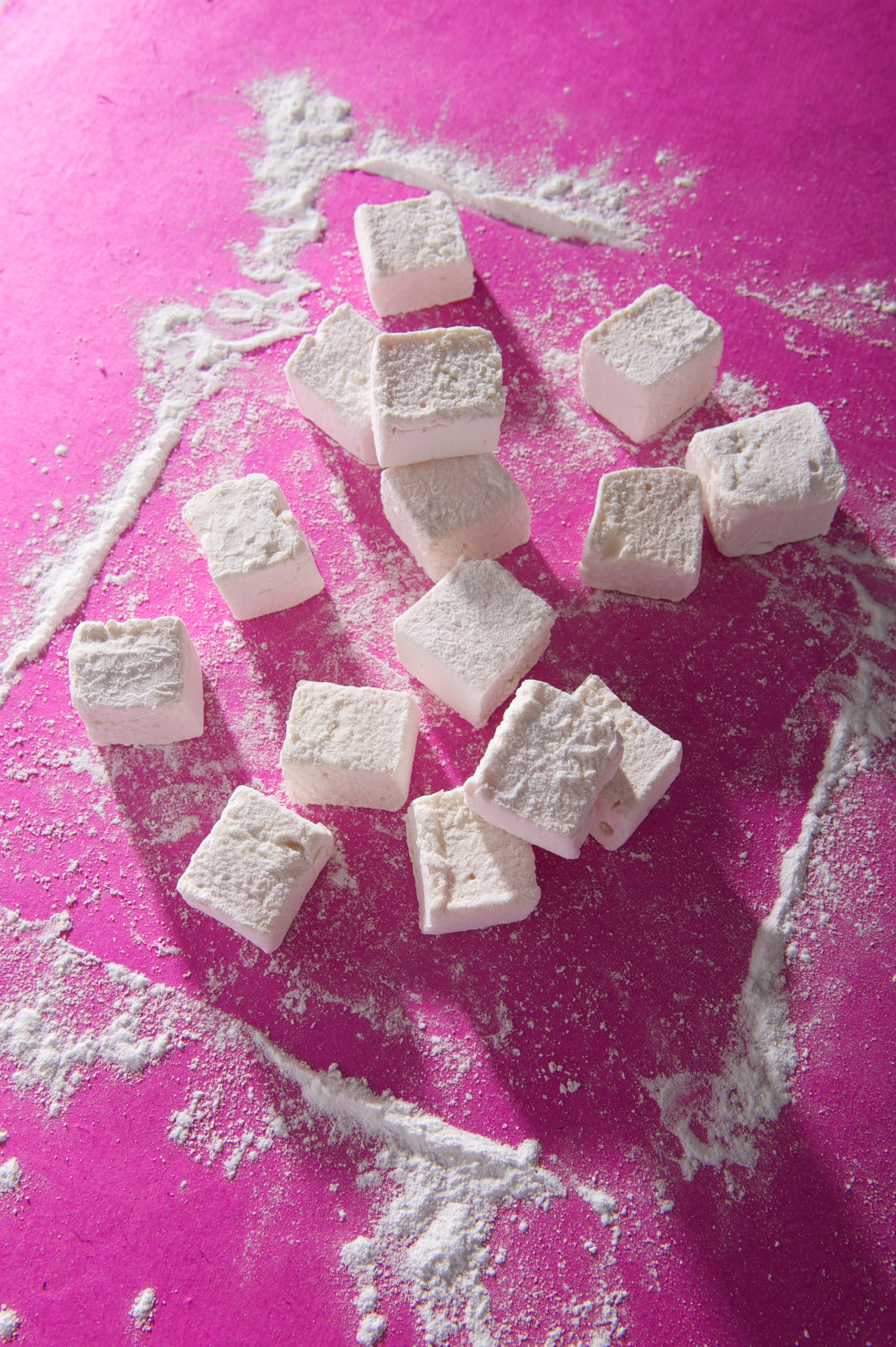
A freshly-cut batch of homemade marshmallows

The home process for making marshmallow differs from commercial processes. A mixture of corn syrup and sugar is boiled to about 252 °F (122 °C). In a separate step, gelatin is hydrated with enough warm water to make a thick solution. Once the sugar syrup has cooled to about 100 °F (38 °C), the gelatin solution is blended in along with desired flavoring, and whipped in a mixer to reach the final density. The marshmallow is then scooped out of the bowl, slabbed on a table, and cut into pieces.

== Roasted marshmallows and s'mores ==
A popular camping or backyard tradition in the United Kingdom, United States, Canada, New Zealand, Australia, and Hong Kong is the roasting or toasting of marshmallows over a campfire or other open flame. A marshmallow is placed on the end of a stick or skewer and held carefully over the fire. This creates a caramelized outer skin with a liquid, molten layer underneath. Major flavor compounds and color polymers associated with sugar browning are created during the caramelization process.

As sugar costs went down in the 19th century, a New Jersey newspaper reported in 1892 that "'Marshmallow roasts' are the newest thing in summer resort diversions." There were more mentions of the trend throughout 1890s, implicitly (and sometimes explicitly) referring to home-made marshmallows, as commercial process was yet to be invented.

S'mores are a traditional campfire treat in the United States, made by placing a toasted marshmallow on a slab of chocolate, which is placed between two graham crackers. These can then be squeezed together, causing the chocolate to begin melting.

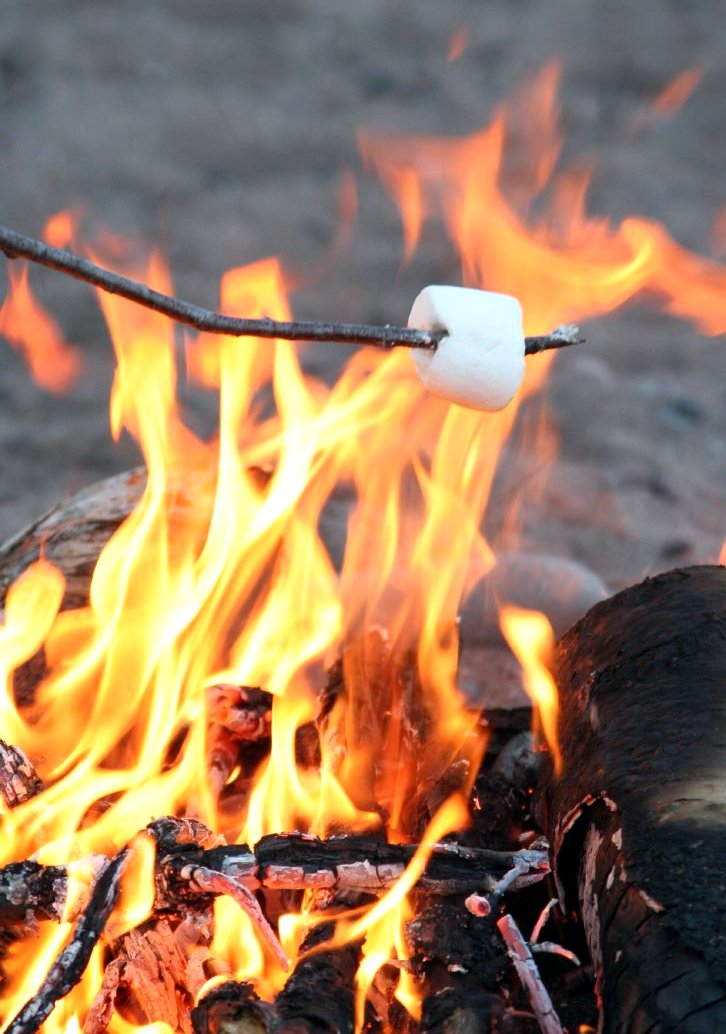
Roasting a marshmallow

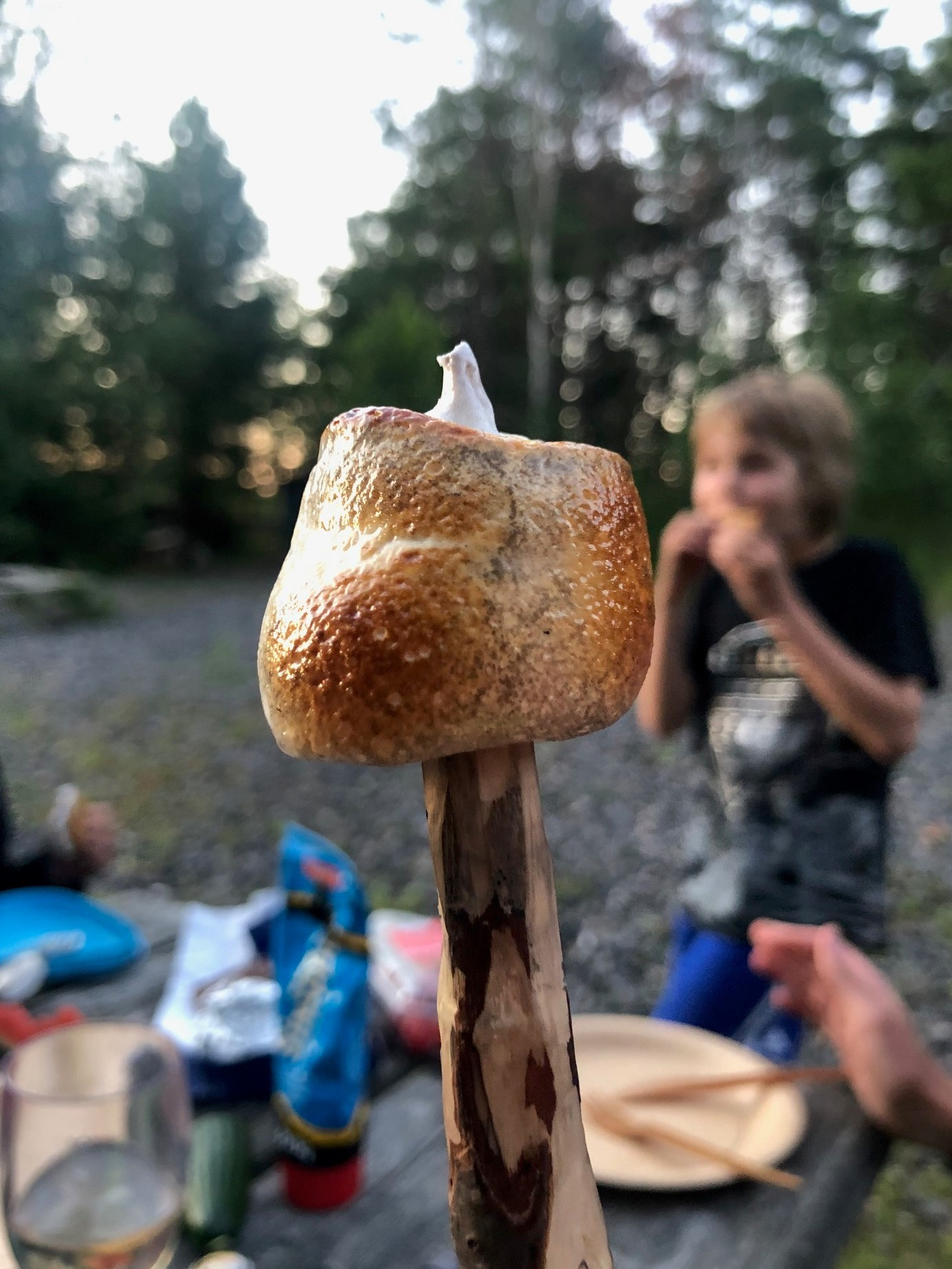
A roasted marshmallow

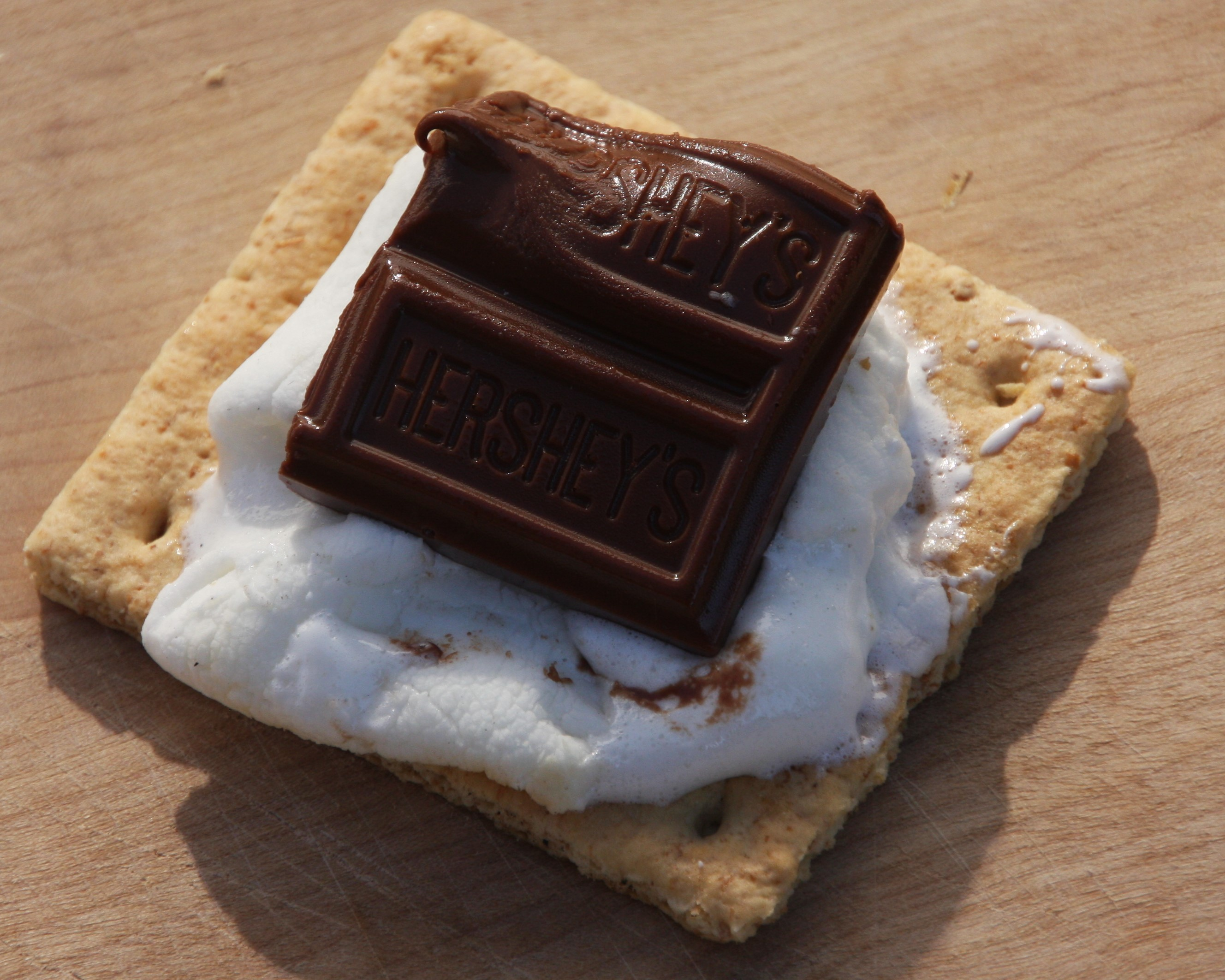
An open-faced s'more

== Nutrition ==
Marshmallows are defined in US law as a food of minimal nutritional value.

== Dietary preferences ==
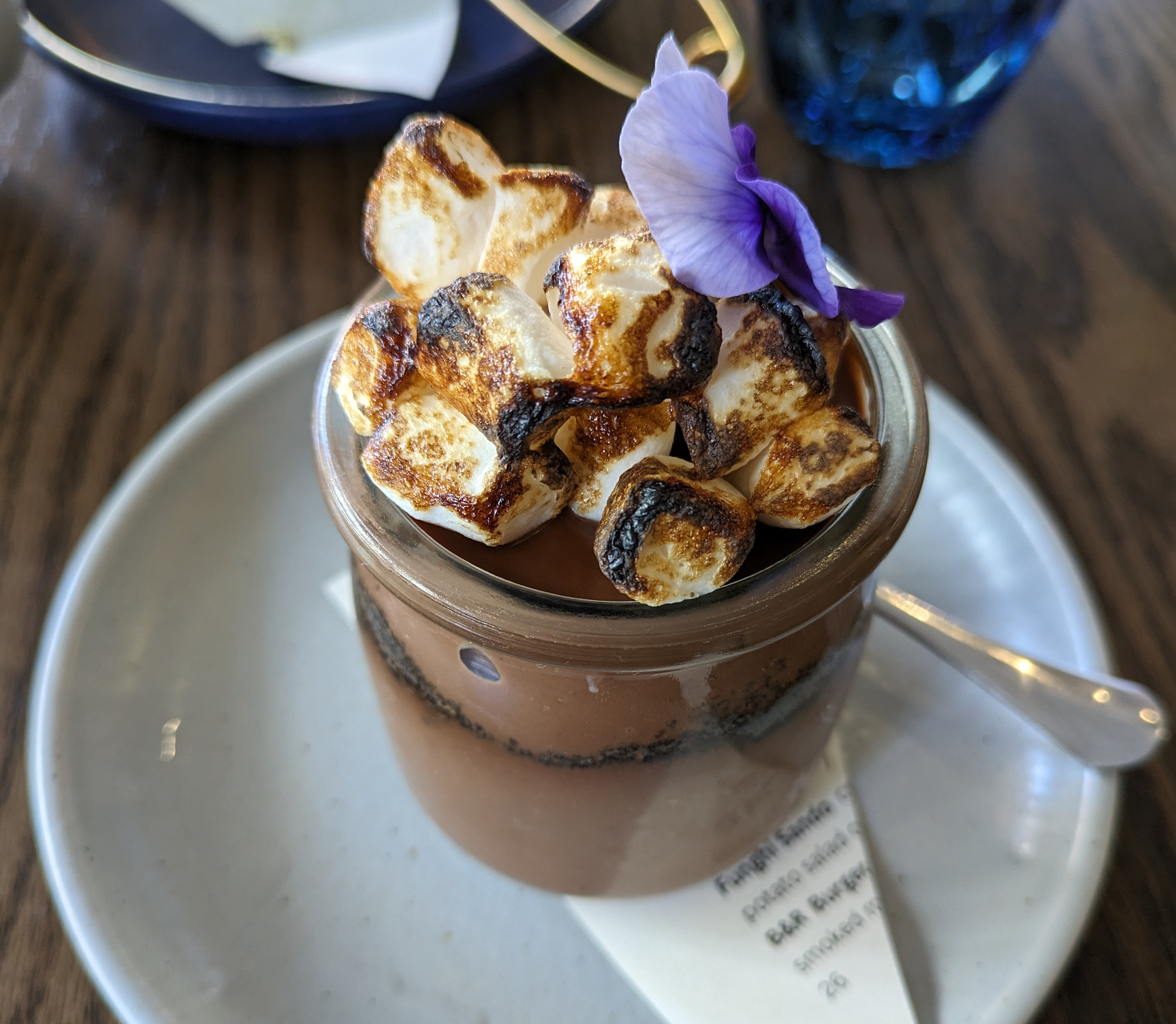
Toasted vegan marshmallows served with chocolate mousse

The traditional marshmallow recipe uses powdered marshmallow root, but most commercially manufactured marshmallows instead use gelatin in their manufacture. Vegans and vegetarians avoid gelatin, but there are versions that use a substitute non-animal gelling agent such as agar. In addition, marshmallows are generally not considered to be kosher or halal unless either their gelatin is derived from kosher or halal animals or they are vegan.

Marshmallow creme and other less firm marshmallow products generally contain little or no gelatin, which mainly serves to allow the familiar marshmallow confection to retain its shape. They generally use egg whites instead. Non-gelatin, egg-containing versions of this product may be consumed by ovo vegetarians. Several brands of vegetarian and vegan marshmallows and marshmallow fluff exist.

== See also ==
- Ambrosia (fruit salad)
- Chocolate-coated marshmallow treats
- Chubby Bunny, children's game involving marshmallows
- Divinity (confectionery)
- Flump (sweet)
- Nougat
- Stanford marshmallow experiment
- Stay Puft Marshmallow Man
- Zefir (food)
