= List of compositions by William Bolcom =

This is a list of compositions by William Bolcom.

== By genre ==
=== Operas ===
- McTeague (1991–92)
- A View from the Bridge (1997–98)
- A Wedding (2003)
- Dinner at Eight (2016)

=== Symphonies ===
- Symphony No. 1 (1957)
- Symphony No. 2 Oracles (1964)
- Symphony No. 3 Symphony for Chamber Orchestra (1979)
- Symphony No. 4 (1986)
- Symphony No. 5 (1989)
- Symphony No. 6 (1996–1997)
- Symphony No. 7 (2002)
- Symphony No. 8 (2005)
- Symphony No. 9 (2012)
- Symphony No. 1 for band (2008)

=== Concertos ===
- Piano Concerto (1976)
- Violin Concerto in D (1983)
- Fantasia Concertante (1984)
- Clarinet Concerto (1988)
- Flute Concerto Lyric Concerto (1992–1993)
- Concerto for Two Pianos Left Hand Gaea (1996)
- Concerto Grosso for Saxophone Quartet and Orchestra (2000)
- Romanza (2009)
- Trombone Concerto (2016)
- Concerto for Soprano Saxophone and Band (2016)
- 2nd Piano Concerto (2019)

=== Piano ===
- Miscellaneous rags (24)
- Three Ghost Rags (1970)
  - Graceful Ghost Rag
  - Poltergeist Rag
  - Dream Shadows Rag
- The Garden of Eden (1974)
- Twelve Etudes (1959–66)
- Twelve New Etudes for Piano (1977–1986)
- Nine Bagatelles (1996)
- Nine New Bagatelles (2005)
- Bird Spirits (1999)
- Dream Music No. 1 (1965)
- Fantasy-Sonata (1961)
- Ballade (2008)

Organ

- Mysteries (1976), commissioned for the 1976 International Contemporary Organ Music Festival, premiered by William Albright.

=== Song cycles ===
- Songs of Innocence and of Experience
- Ancient Cabaret
- Briefly It Enters
- Cabaret Songs
- I Will Breathe a Mountain
- Let Evening Come
- Minicabs
- Old Addresses
- Open House
- Songs To Dance
- Three Donald Hall Songs
- A Whitman Triptych
- Morning and Evening Poems
- Medusa
- Laura Sonnets
- Chestnuts

=== Novelty songs ===
- "Lime Jello Marshmallow Cottage Cheese Surprise"

=== Guitar ===
- Seasons

== By year ==
- 1957: First Symphony
- 1964: Symphony No. 2 "Oracles"
- 1967: Black Host (Nonesuch H-71260)
- 1970: Graceful Ghost Rag
- 1971: Commedia (for "Almost" 18th Century Orchestra)
- 1974: The Garden of Eden
- 1979: Third Symphony (for Chamber Orchestra)
- 1956-82: Songs of Innocence and of Experience (William Blake)
- 1978-83: "Cabaret Songs" (Vol. 1 and 2)
- 1979-1984: Gospel Preludes (Books 1-4), for organ
  - Book IV: Sometimes I Feel Like A Motherless Child (a reaction to Marvin Gaye's death), Sweet Hour of Prayer, and Fantasy on "O Zion Haste" and "The Church's One Foundation"
- 1984: Lilith for Alto Saxophone and Piano
- 1977-85: Cabaret Songs (Vol. 1 and 2)
- 1984: Songs of Innocence and of Experience
- 1985: Fantasia Concertante, for viola, cello and orchestra
- 1986: Fourth Symphony
- 1977-86: Twelve New Etudes for Piano [Winner of 1988 Pulitzer Prize in Music]
- 1989: Fifth Symphony
- 1991-92: McTeague (opera)
- 1996: Cabaret Songs (Vol. 3 and 4)
- 1996: Gaea, Concerto for Two Left-Handed Pianists, and Orchestra
- 1996-97: Sixth Symphony
- 1997-98: A View from the Bridge (opera)
- 1998: Concert Suite (for alto saxophone and band)
- 2000: (First) Piano Quintet
- 2002: Seventh Symphony: A Symphonic Concerto
- 2003: A Wedding (opera)
- 2005: La fantome du Clavecin (for harpsichord)
- 2006: Canciones de Lorca
- 2007: Eighth Symphony
- 2007: Lucrezia
- 2008: First Symphony for Band
- 2009: Prometheus
- 2009: Romanza (for solo violin and string orchestra)
- 2011: Ninth Symphony
- 2016: Dinner at Eight (opera)
- 2019: Three Miniatures, premiered by the 2020 Eastern Michigan University Honors Band.
