= Orange salad =

Orange salad might refer to:

- Seafoam salad
- Sicilian orange salad
