= Tomer Zvulun =

Israeli stage director (born 1976)

- Born: 1976 (age 49–50)
- Occupation: Stage Director

Tomer Zvulun (born in 1976) is the General and Artistic Director of Atlanta Opera since 2013.

== Life and career ==
Zvulun studied art and music at the Open University in Tel Aviv, and graduated from the Executive Program of Leadership Development at Harvard Business School. He immigrated to the United States in 2001. For seven years he was engaged as an assistant director at the Metropolitan Opera of New York, where he directed revivals of Tosca and Carmen. Zvulun is a frequent guest director at the Seattle Opera (Semele, La Boheme, Eugene Onegin, Lucia di Lammermoor), The Dallas Opera (Die Fledermaus, La Boheme), Houston (The Flying Dutchman, Rigoletto), The Wexford Festival (Silent Night, Dinner at Eight), the Cincinnati Opera (Magic Flute, Don Giovanni, Flying Dutchman), Wolf Trap Opera (Falstaff, Don Giovanni) and the Israeli Opera (Dead Man Walking, Giulio Cesare). He has directed productions at numerous opera houses in North and South America, including The Metropolitan Opera, Washington National Opera, Houston Grand Opera, Seattle Opera, San Diego Opera, Minnesota Opera, Opera de Montreal, Boston Lyric Opera, Dallas, Buenos Aires, Wolf Trap, New Orleans, Glimmerglass Opera, as well as at prestigious educational institutions such as Juilliard School, Indiana University and Boston University. Zvulun is known for introducing the European premieres of numerous American operas. In 2014, his production of Silent Night at the Wexford Festival received multiple Irish Times awards as best production of the year. In 2018, his production of Dinner at Eight received its European premiere at the Wexford Festival Opera in Ireland. In 2019 his production of Dead Man Walking was presented in Tel Aviv, becoming the first modern American opera to be presented in that house.

Since June 2013, he has been the artistic director of the Atlanta Opera. As a director, he has interpreted a wide range of operas. In the 2017–18 season he staged three completely different works: the Wagner opera The Flying Dutchman, the musical Sweeney Todd by Stephen Sondheim and the Holocaust opera Out of Darkness by American composer Jake Heggie.

His collaboration with the Harvard Business School led to a case study about his leadership at the Atlanta Opera. It documents the changes he has brought during his tenure. The case study is currently being taught as part of the executive program curriculum at The Harvard Business School. In 2018 he was invited to deliver a talk at TEDXEmory on innovation in opera titled "Opera in the Age of the Iphone". Zvulun presented several Baroque operas, but he also staged the classical repertoire from Mozart to Puccini and Richard Strauss. In addition he presented several works by contemporary composers such as William Bolcom, Jake Heggie and Kevin Puts. In 2025, he received the Georgia Governor's Award for the Arts and Humanities for his contribution to the arts in the state.

== Productions ==
- 2013: Lucrezia Borgia - Buenos Aires Lirica
- 2013: Falstaff - Wolf Trap Opera, Des Moines Metro Opera
- 2014: Rigoletto - Boston Lyric Opera, Atlanta Opera, Omaha Opera
- 2014: Madama Butterfly - Atlanta Opera, Castleton Festival
- 2014: Silent Night by Kevin Puts - Wexford Festival Opera, Atlanta Opera, Glimmerglass Festival, Washington National Opera, Austin Opera
- 2016: Dead Man Walking by Jake Heggie - New Orleans Opera, Israeli Opera (2019)
- 2016: Soldier Songs by David T. Little - San Diego, Atlanta
- 2017: Dinner at Eight by William Bolcom, world premiere at Minnesota Opera, thereafter also at the Wexford Festival Opera
- 2017: María de Buenos Aires - Atlanta Opera, New Orleans Opera
- 2017: Giulio Cesare in Egitto - Israeli Opera
- 2017: Eugen Onegin - Kansas City, thereafter in Seattle, Atlanta, Detroit and Hawaii
- 2017: Der fliegende Holländer - Atlanta Opera, Houston Grand Opera, Cincinnati Opera
- 2018: Out of Darkness: Two Remain by Jake Heggie - world premiere at Atlanta Opera
- 2022: The (R)evolution of Steve Jobs - Washington National Opera, Atlanta Opera, Lyric Opera of Kansas City
- 2023: Das Rheingold - Atlanta Opera
- 2024: Die Walküre - Atlanta Opera
- 2025: Siegfried - Atlanta Opera
- 2025: Rigoletto - Los Angeles Opera
- 2025: Turandot - Atlanta Opera
- 2026: Götterdämmerung - Atlanta Opera
