= Frog eye salad =

Dessert salad made with pasta

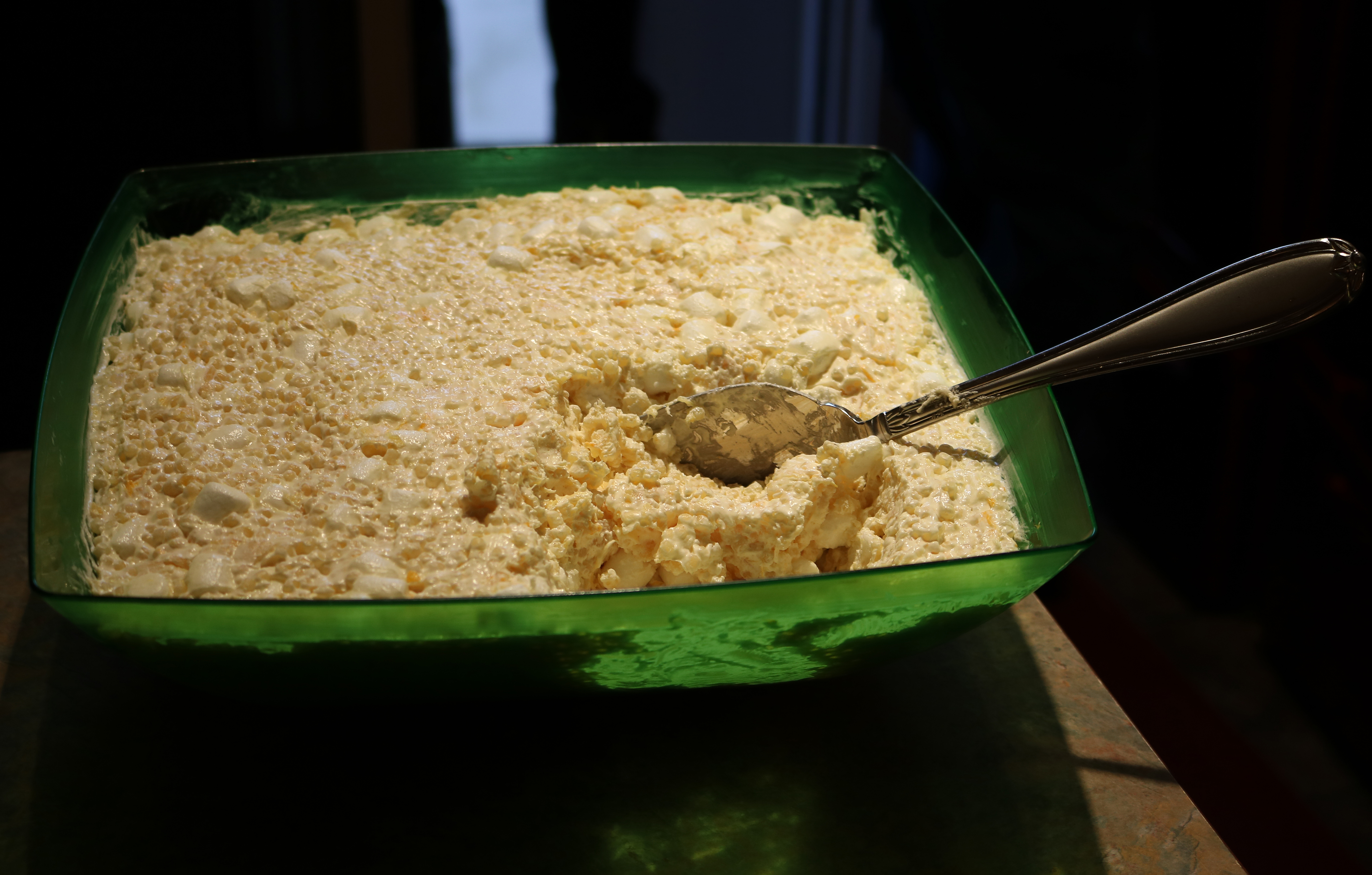
- Frogeye salad as served in Thornton, Colorado, in 2015
- Alternative names: Fish-eye salad
- Place of origin: United States
- Region or state: Idaho, Utah
- Serving temperature: Dessert
- Main ingredients: Pasta
- Ingredients generally used: Egg yolks, whipped topping
- Variations: Fruit, marshmallows

Frog eye salad (also frog-eye salad or frog's eye salad alternatively fish-eye salad or fish's eye salad) is a type of sweet pasta salad (dessert salad) made with small, round acini di pepe pasta, whipped topping, and egg yolks. Fruit, such as mandarin oranges and pineapples, are often mixed in, and it is sometimes topped with marshmallows, all of which contribute to the sweetness while adding variety. The humorous name refers to the pasta looking like frog's eyes.

The salad has a strong regional presence in Idaho and Utah and surrounding states (the Mormon Corridor), especially among members of the Church of Jesus Christ of Latter-day Saints.

Due to the prevalence of potlucks in Mormon culture, recipes for frogeye salad, as well as other dishes in Mormon cuisine, are often found in ward cookbooks (collections of recipes compiled from a single congregation). The widespread nature of the Church of Jesus Christ of Latter-day Saints combined with the communal nature in which the dish is served have created countless variations of frogeye salad unique to specific areas and congregations. In 2021, at the Utah Museum of Contemporary Art in Salt Lake City, photographs of frogeye salad were displayed alongside other foods in a showcase of Mormon cultural dishes.

== See also ==
- Rice pudding
- Tapioca pudding
- List of salads
- Fruit salad
- Jello salad
- Seafoam salad
