= Gaea (Bolcom) =

Gaea, for Two Pianos Left Hand and Orchestra, also simply called Concerto for Two Pianos Left Hand, is a concert piece by the American composer William Bolcom, written for Leon Fleisher and Gary Graffman.

The composition, which received its first performance in Baltimore in April 1996, is constructed in such a way that it can be performed in one of three ways, with either piano part alone with reduced orchestra, or with both piano parts and the two reduced orchestras combined into a full orchestra.

The piece was one of several that could fully or partially trace their origin to the loss of use in Fleisher's right hand in 1965, according to Fleisher's Kennedy Center biography.

== See also ==
- List of compositions by William Bolcom
- List of works for piano left-hand and orchestra
