= Jell-O 1-2-3 =

Defunct gelatin product

Jell-O 1-2-3 was a Jell-O gelatin product introduced in 1969 and discontinued in 1996. The product was one 4.3 ounce (121 g) powdered mix that, when properly prepared, separated and solidified into three distinct layers: a creamy top, a mousse-like middle, and regular Jell-O bottom.

== In popular culture ==
- In an episode of the TV show The Nanny, Schlepped Away, Fran's mother prepared Jell-O 1-2-3 for her and the Sheffields. Fran notes that it hasn't been produced in a long time, and her mother claims she's been saving it for a "special occasion".
