= Jell-O =

Dessert brand made by Kraft Foods

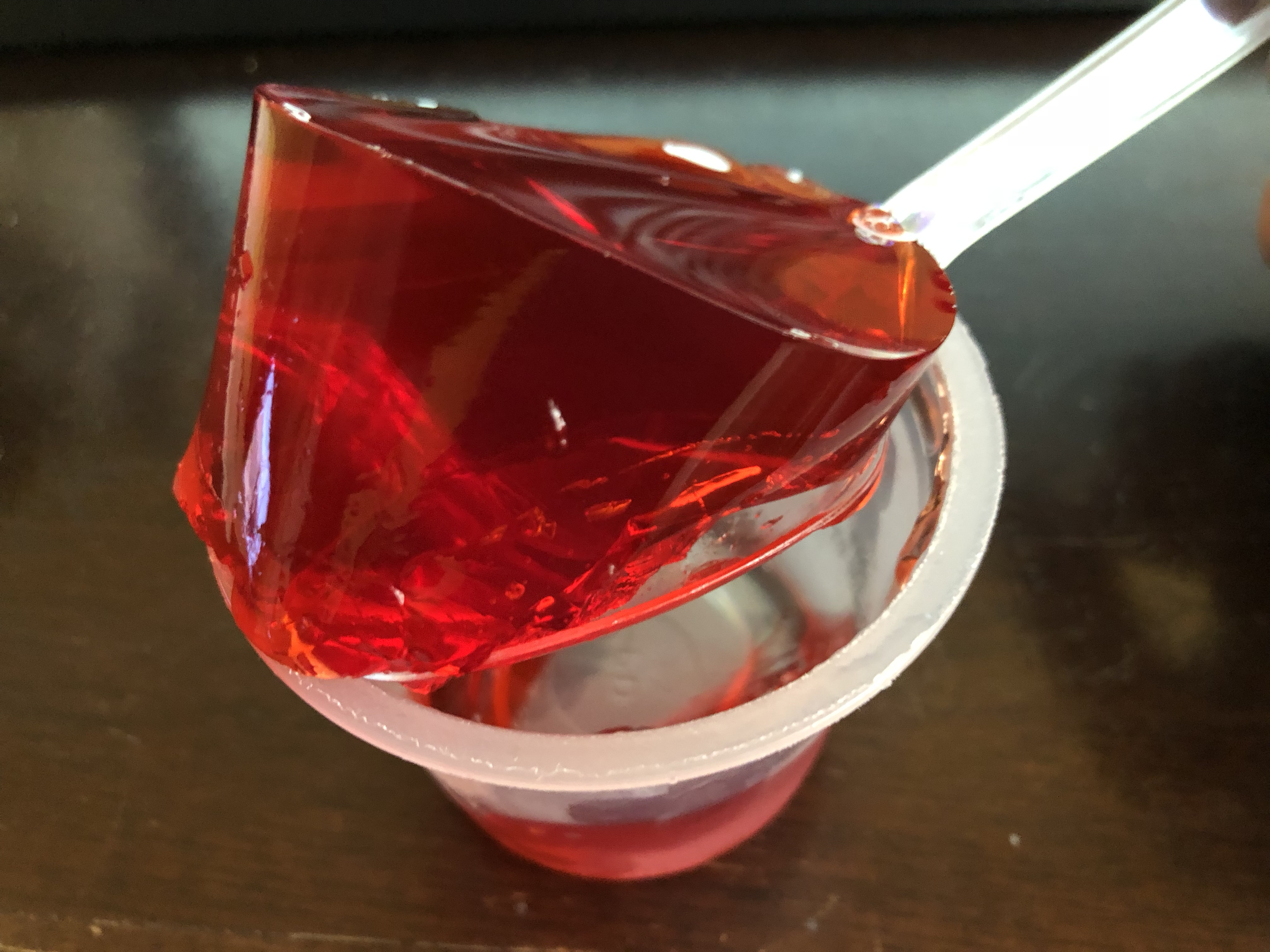
- Product type: Gelatin dessert, pudding
- Current owner: Kraft Heinz
- Produced by: Kraft Foods
- Country: United States
- Introduced: 1897; 129 years ago
- Website: www.kraftheinz.com/jell-o

Jell-O
- Type: Gelatin desserts, puddings
- Place of origin: United States
- Created by: Pearle Bixby Wait
- Main ingredients: Powdered gelatin, sugar or artificial sweetener, artificial flavors, food coloring
- Variations: Many flavors and various snacks
- Food energy (per 21g – 23gr serving): 80 kcal (330 kJ) [regular], 10 kcal (42 kJ) [sugar-free]
Nutritional value
(per 21g – 23gr serving)
- Protein: 2 g
- Fat: 0 g
- Carbohydrate: 19 g

Jell-O (stylized in all caps) is an American brand offering a variety of powdered gelatin dessert (fruit-flavored gels/jellies), pudding, and no-bake cream pie mixes. The original gelatin dessert (genericized as jello) is the signature of the brand. "Jell-O" is a registered trademark of Kraft Heinz, and is based in Chicago, Illinois.

The dessert was especially popular in the first half of the 20th century. The original gelatin dessert began in Le Roy, New York, in 1897, when Pearle Bixby Wait registered a trademark for the name Jell-O. He and his wife May had made the product by adding strawberry, raspberry, orange, and lemon flavoring to sugar and granulated gelatin (which had been patented in 1845). The powder is mixed with boiling water and then cooled to produce a gel.

== Description ==
Jell-O is sold prepared (ready-to-eat), or in powder form, and is available in various colors and flavors. The powder contains powdered gelatin and flavorings, including sugar or artificial sweeteners. It is dissolved in hot water, then chilled and allowed to set. Fruit, vegetables, and whipped cream can be added to make elaborate desserts that can be molded into shapes.

Some non-gelatin pudding and pie-filling products are sold under the Jell-O brand. Ordinary Jell-O pudding is cooked on the stove top (with milk) then eaten warm or chilled, whereas Jell-O instant pudding is mixed with cold milk and chilled; it sets without cooking. To make pie fillings, the same pudding products are prepared with less liquid.

== History ==
=== Early history ===
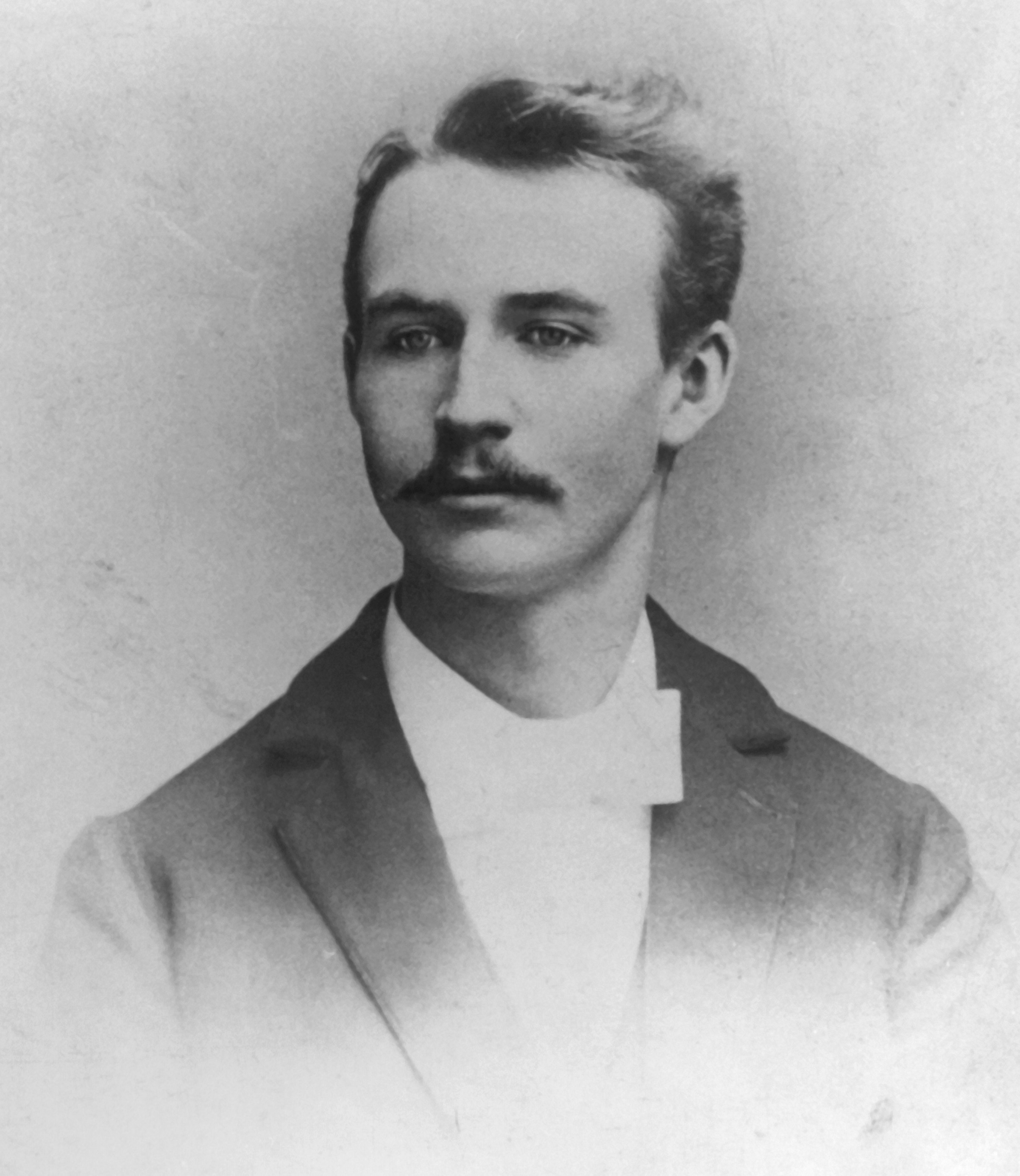
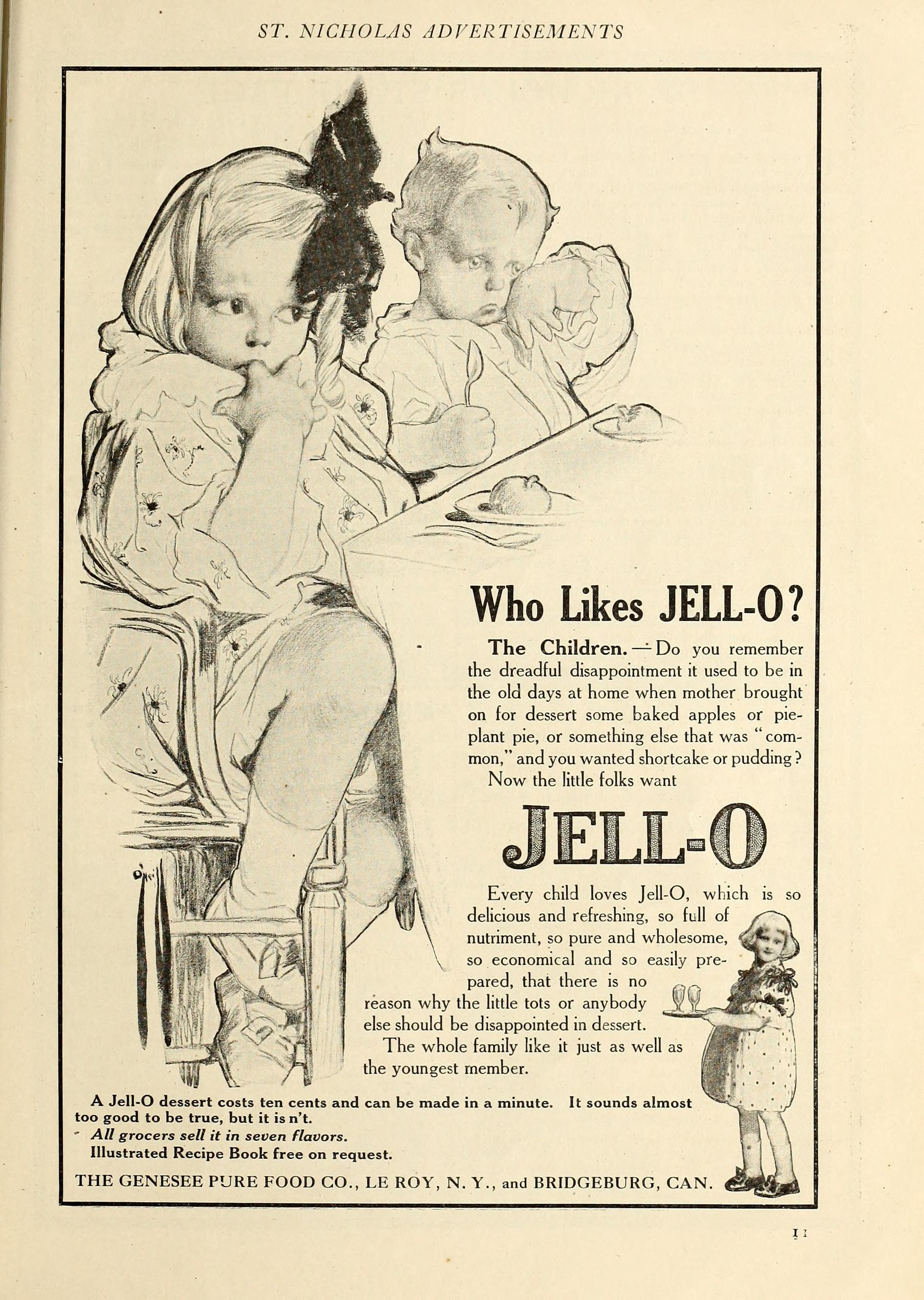
(Left): Pearle Bixby Wait, creator of the "Jell-O" brand; (right): Jell-O advertisement by the Genesee Pure Food Company, c. 1910

Gelatin, a protein produced from collagen extracted from boiled bones, connective tissues, and other animal products, has been a component of food, particularly desserts, since the 15th century.

Gelatin was popularized in New York in the Victorian era with spectacular and complex jelly molds. Gelatin was sold in sheets and had to be purified, which was time-consuming. Gelatin desserts were the province of royalty and the relatively well-to-do. In 1845, a patent for powdered gelatin was obtained by industrialist Peter Cooper, who built the first American steam-powered locomotive, the Tom Thumb. This powdered gelatin was easy to manufacture and easier to use in cooking.

In 1897, in LeRoy, New York, carpenter and cough syrup manufacturer Pearle Bixby Wait trademarked a gelatin dessert called "Jell-O". Wait and his wife, May, added strawberry, raspberry, orange, and lemon flavoring to granulated gelatin and sugar. In 1899, Wait sold Jell-O to "Orator Francis Woodward", whose Genesee Pure Food Company produced the successful Grain-O health drink. Part of the legal agreement between Woodward and Wait dealt with the similar Jell-O name.

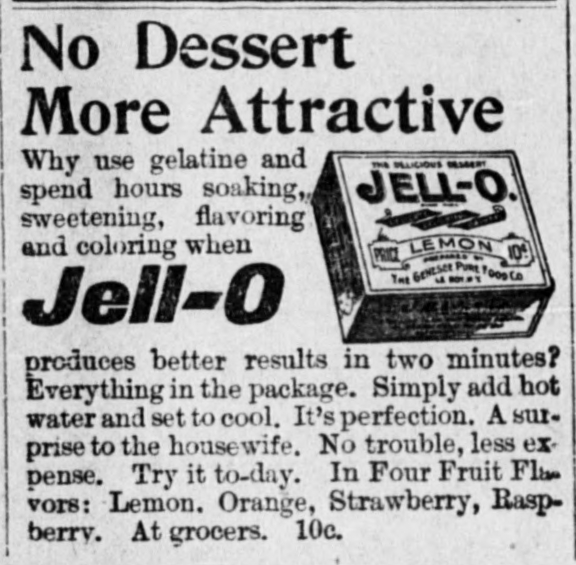
1904 advertisement

=== Going mainstream ===
Various elements were key to Jell-O becoming a mainstream product: new technologies, such as refrigeration, powdered gelatin and machine packaging, home economics classes, and the company's marketing.

Initially, Woodward struggled to sell the powdered product. Beginning in 1902, to raise awareness, Woodward's Genesee Pure Food Company placed advertisements in the Ladies' Home Journal proclaiming Jell-O to be "America's Most Famous Dessert." Jell-O was a minor success until 1904, when Genesee Pure Food Company sent armies of salesmen into the field to distribute free Jell-O cookbooks, a pioneering marketing tactic.

"America's Most Famous Dessert", 1910s advertisement

Within a decade, Genesee Pure Food Company added three new flavors, chocolate (discontinued in 1927), cherry, and peach, and it launched the brand in Canada. Celebrity testimonials and recipes appeared in advertisements featuring actress Ethel Barrymore and opera singer Ernestine Schumann-Heink. Some Jell-O illustrated advertisements were painted by Maxfield Parrish.

In 1923, the newly rechristened Jell-O Company launched "D-Zerta", an artificially sweetened version of Jell-O. Two years later, Postum and Genesee merged, and in 1927 Postum acquired Clarence Birdseye's frozen foods company to form the General Foods Corporation.

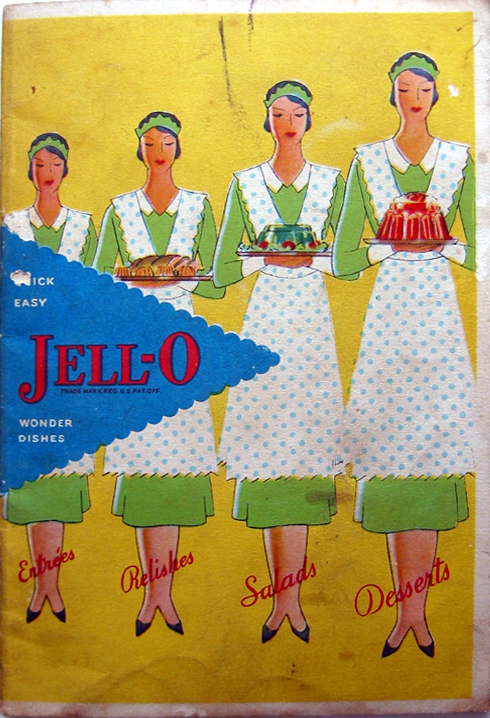
Quick, Easy Jell-O Wonder Dishes, Jell-O Cookbook of 1930

By 1930, there appeared a vogue in American cuisine for congealed salads, and the company introduced lime-flavored Jell-O, to complement the add-ins that cooks across the country were combining in these aspics and salads. Popular Jell-O recipes often included ingredients like cabbage, celery, green peppers, and even cooked pasta.

In 1934, sponsorship from Jell-O made comedian Jack Benny the dessert's spokesperson. At this time Post introduced a jingle ("featured" by the agency Young & Rubicam) that was familiar over several decades, in which the spelling "J-E-L-L-O" was (or could be) sung over a rising five-note musical theme.

The jingle was written by Don Bestor, who, at the time, was the bandleader on Jack Benny's radio show, "The Jell-O Program Starring Jack Benny."

In 1936, chocolate returned to the Jell-O lineup, as an instant pudding made with milk. It proved enormously popular, and over time other pudding flavors were added such as vanilla, tapioca, coconut, pistachio, butterscotch, egg custard, flan, and rice pudding.

By the 1950s, salads became so popular that Jell-O responded with savory and vegetable flavors such as celery, Italian, mixed vegetable, and seasoned tomato. These flavors have since been discontinued.

=== Baby boom ===
External videos
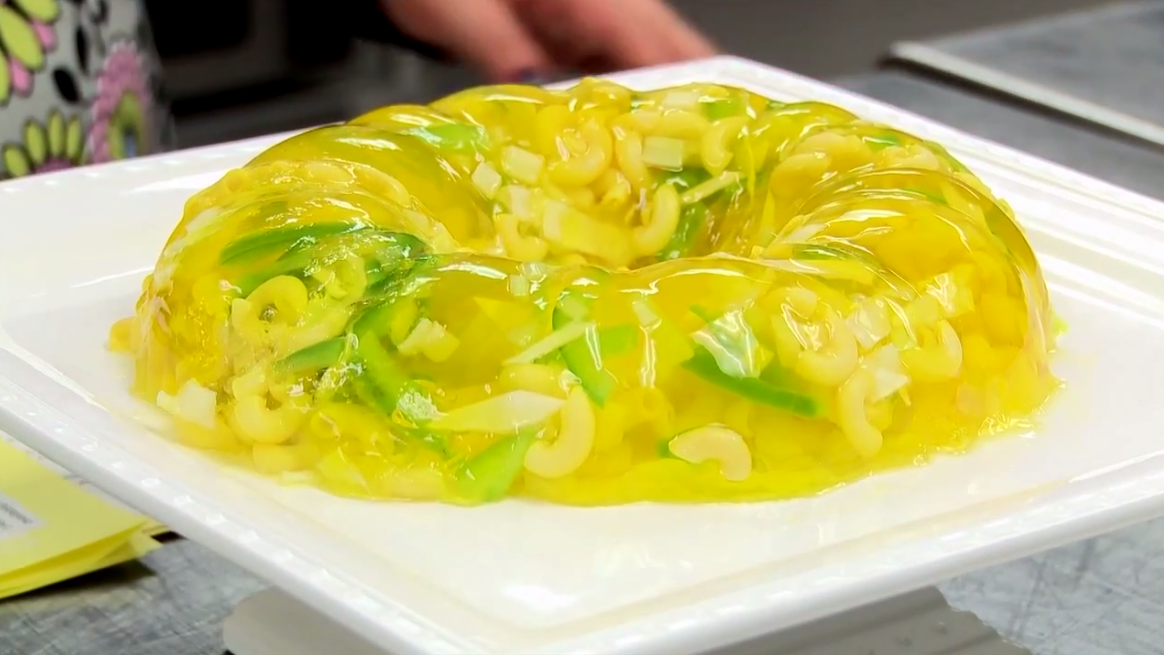
- Kitchen Chemistry: Jell-O, Tracing Jell-O’s rise to fame, Science History Institute

Though much of the elaborate and dainty tea time fare served between the 1920s and 1950s was luxurious and decorative, using fancy ingredients like caviar or lobster, Jell-O became an affordable ornamental ingredient that women were able to use to create feminine, light, delicate dishes that were the standard of refined tea time fare during that period. By the Jazz Age nearly 1/3 of salad recipes in an average cookbook were gelatin-based recipes including varied fillings of fruit, vegetables or even cream cheese.

Typical recipes from the early 20th century included exotic fruits like figs, dates and bananas, or lemon flavored jello paired with maraschino cherries and other ingredients like marshmallows and almonds. One sweet gelatin-based fruit dessert called only "Good Salad" includes vanilla pudding, tapioca pudding, pineapple, mandarin oranges and orange gelatin. The pudding mixes are made with the reserved juice from the canned fruit and the flavored gelatin, the fruits are added and the dessert salad is allowed to set in the fridge and served cool.

One savory recipe collected by the Des Moines Register, published in Iowa, is for a tomato soup gelatin salad. The salad, served chilled, is made from lemon gelatin, tomato soup, cream cheese, stuffed olives combined with various other ingredients and seasonings.

The baby boom saw a significant increase in sales for Jell-O. Young mothers didn't have the supporting community structures of earlier generations, so marketers were quick to promote easy-to-prepare prepackaged foods. By this time, creating a Jell-O dessert required simply boiling water, combining the water with Jell-O, and putting the mixture into Tupperware molds and refrigerating it for a short time.

New flavors were continually added and unsuccessful flavors were removed: in the 1950s and 1960s, apple, black cherry, black raspberry, grape, lemon-lime, mixed fruit, orange-banana, pineapple-grapefruit, blackberry, strawberry-banana, tropical fruit, and more intense "wild" versions of the venerable strawberry, raspberry, and cherry. In 1966, the Jell-O "No-Bake" dessert line was launched, which allowed a cheesecake to be made in 15 minutes. In 1969, Jell-O 1∗2∗3 (later Jell-O 1•2•3), a gelatin dessert that separated into three layers as it cooled, was unveiled. Until 1987, Jell-O 1•2•3 was readily found in grocery stores throughout most of the United States, but the dessert is now discontinued. In 1971 packaged prepared pudding called Jell-O Pudding Treats were introduced. Jell-O Whip 'n Chill, a mousse-style dessert, was introduced and widely promoted; it remains available in limited areas today. A similar dessert called Jell-O Soft Swirl was introduced in 1972, flavors included Chocolate Creme, Strawberry Creme, Vanilla Creme, and Peach Creme. Florence Henderson appeared in TV ads for this product.

=== Sales decline and turnaround ===
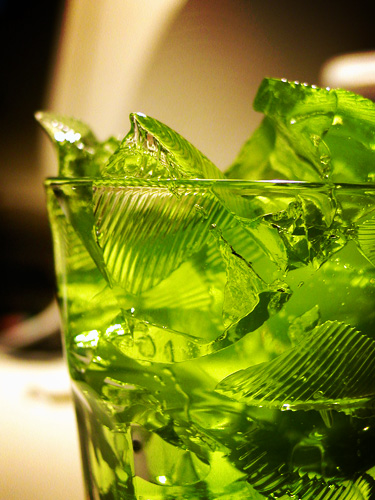
Lime Jell-O

In 1964, the slogan "There's always room for Jell-O" was introduced, promoting the product as a "light dessert" that could easily be consumed even after a heavy meal.

Throughout the 1960s through the 1980s, Jell-O's sales steadily decreased. Many Jell-O dishes, such as desserts and Jell-O salads, became special occasion foods rather than everyday items. Marketers blamed this decline on decreasing family sizes, a "fast-paced" lifestyle and women's increasing employment. By 1986, a market study concluded that mothers with young children rarely purchased Jell-O.

To turn things around, Jell-O hired Dana Gioia to stop the decline. The marketing team revisited the Jell-O recipes published in past cookbooks and rediscovered Jigglers, although the original recipe did not use that name. Jigglers are Jell-O snacks molded into fun shapes and eaten as finger food. Jell-O launched a massive marketing campaign, notably featuring Bill Cosby as spokesman. The campaign was a huge success, causing a significant market gain.

Cosby became the brand's spokesperson in 1974, and he continued as the voice of Jell-O for almost thirty years. Over his tenure as the mouthpiece for the company, he helped introduce new products such as frozen Jell-O Pops (in gelatin and pudding varieties); the new Sugar-Free Jell-O, which replaced D-Zerta in 1984 and was sweetened with NutraSweet; Jell-O Jigglers concentrated gummi snacks; and Sparkling Jell-O, a carbonated version of the dessert touted as the "Champagne of Jell-O". In 2010, Cosby returned as Jell-O spokesperson in an on-line web series called OBKB.

In 1990, General Foods was merged into Kraft Foods Inc. by parent company Philip Morris (now the Altria Group). New flavors were introduced: watermelon, blueberry, cranberry, margarita, and piña colada, among others. In 2001, the state Senate of Utah recognized Jell-O as a favorite snack food of Utah, recognizing the fundamental basis of Jell-O in Mormon cuisine such as Jell-O salad, and Governor Michael O. Leavitt declared an annual "Jell-O Week." During the 2002 Winter Olympics in Salt Lake City, the souvenir pins included one depicting green Jell-O.

In the late 1980s and early 1990s, Jell-O's family-friendly reputation was slightly tarnished by Jell-O shots and Jell-O wrestling.

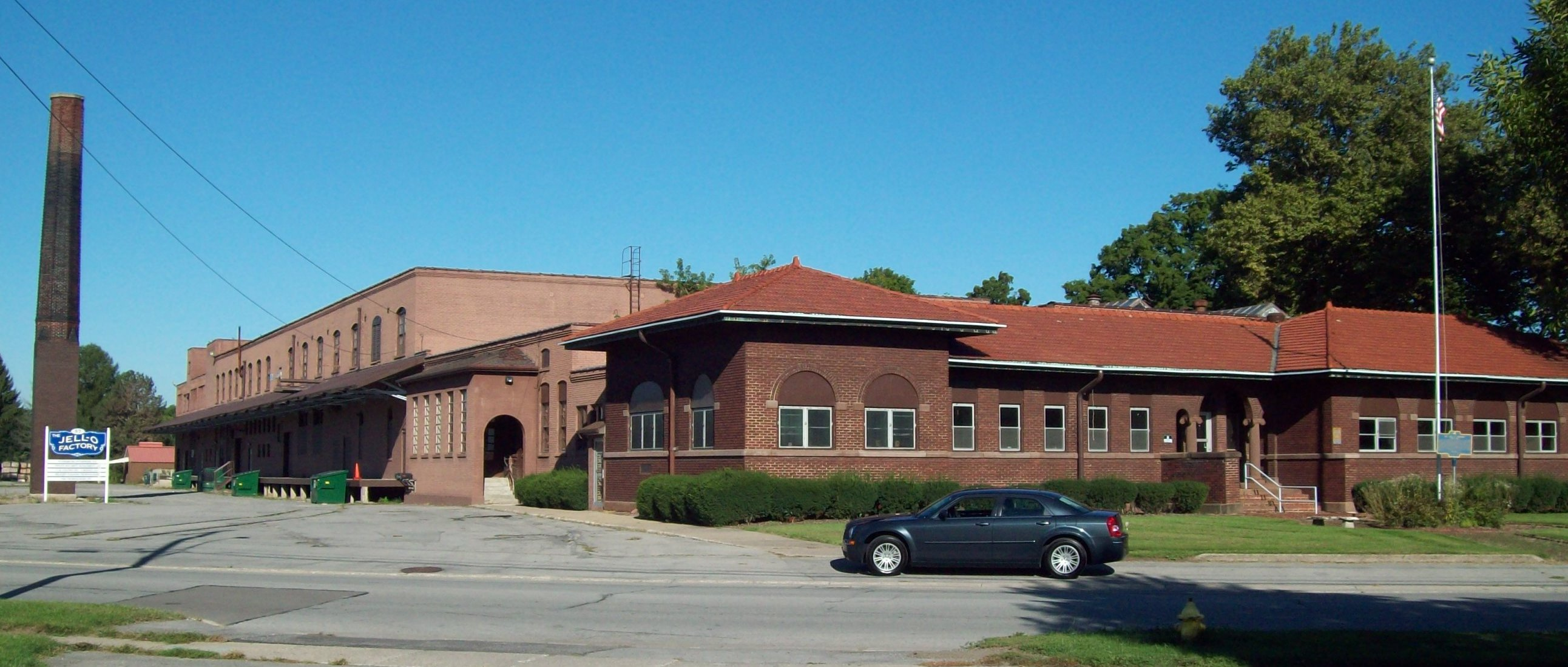
The original Jell-O Factory in Le Roy, New York, pictured in 2010

As of 2011, there were over 420 million boxes of Jell-O gelatin and over 1 billion Jell-O cups sold in the United States each year. As of 2016, there were more than 110 products sold under the Jell-O brand name.

Jell-O is used as a substantial ingredient in a well-known dessert, the "Jell-O mold", which requires a mold designed to hold gelatin, and the depositing of small quantities of chopped fruit, nuts, and other ingredients before it hardens to its typical form. Fresh pineapple, papaya, kiwifruit, and ginger root cannot be used because they contain enzymes that prevent gelatin from "setting". In the case of pineapple juice and the enzyme bromelain that it contains though, the enzyme can be inactivated without denaturing through excessive heating and thus altering the flavor by the addition of a small measured amount of capsaicin sourced from hot chilies.

== Jell-O shots ==
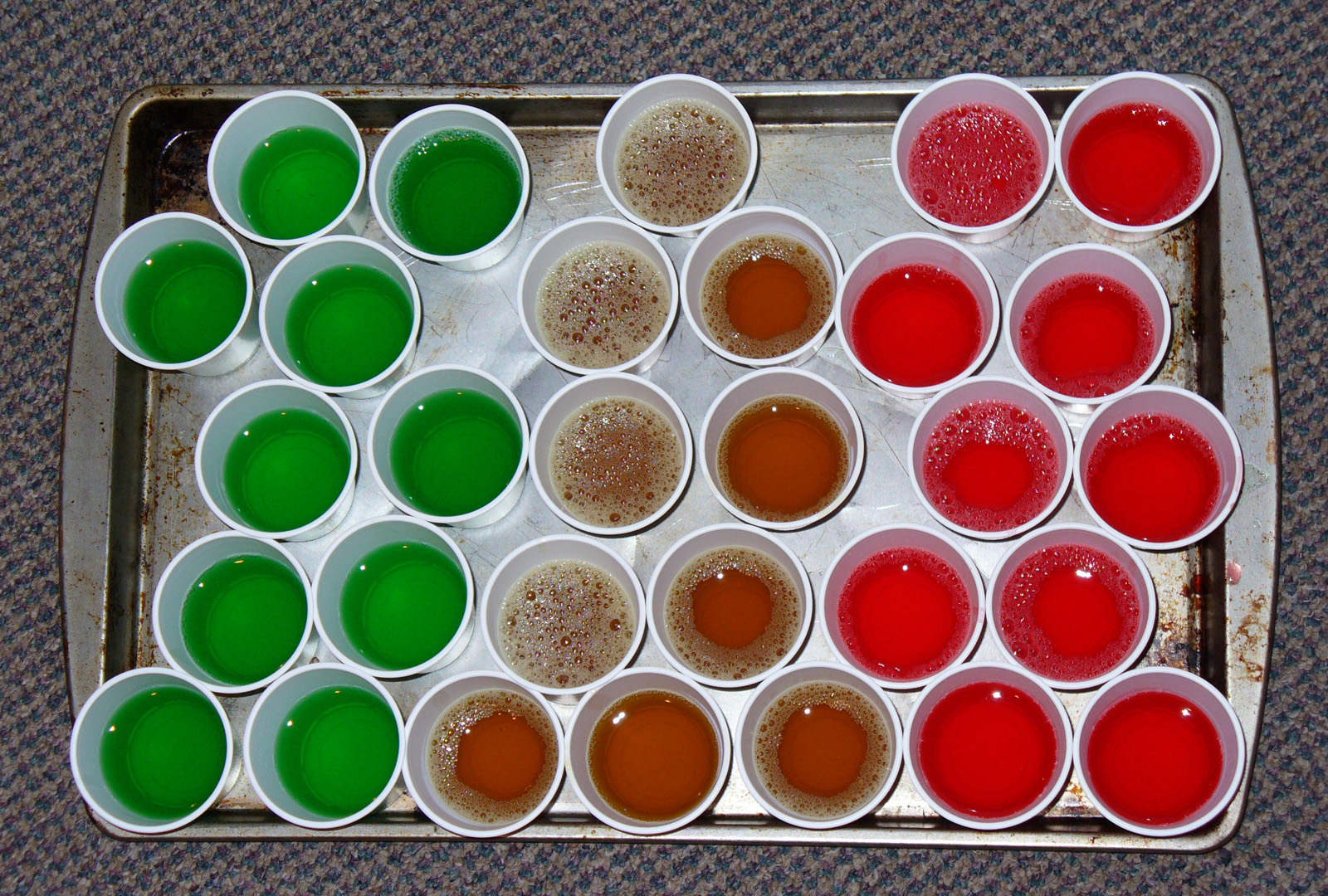
Tray of jello shots

An alternative recipe calls for the addition of an alcoholic beverage to the mix, contributing approximately one third to one half of the liquid added after the gelatin has dissolved in a boil. A serving of the resulting mixture is called a "Jell-O shot", or the genericized "Jello shot", at parties. The quantity and timing of the addition of the liquor are vital aspects; it is not possible to make Jell-O shots with liquor alone, as the colloidal proteins in dry gelatin consist of chains which require a hot liquid to denature them before they can then reform as a semisolid colloidal suspension. Pure alcohol cannot be heated sufficiently to break down these proteins, as it evaporates.

Vodka or rum is commonly used in Jell-O shots, but the shots can be made with almost any liquor or blends of multiple liquors. It is important to adjust the proportions of alcohol and cold water to ensure that the mixture sets when experimenting with various liquors. The Jell-O shots can be served in shot glasses or small paper or plastic cups; the paper or plastic cups are easier to eat from, but shot glasses are more attractive. The alcohol in Jell-O shots is contained within the Jell-O, so the body absorbs it more slowly, causing people to underestimate how much alcohol they have consumed. Drinkers must monitor their intake because of this.

American singer-songwriter Tom Lehrer claims to have invented the Jell-O shot in the 1950s to circumvent restrictions on alcoholic beverages at the army base where he was stationed. An early published recipe for an alcoholic gelatin drink dates from 1862, found in How to Mix Drinks, or The Bon Vivant's Companion by Jerry Thomas: his recipe for "Punch Jelly" calls for the addition of isinglass or other gelatin to a punch made from cognac, rum, and lemon juice. Thomas warns that strength of the punch is "artfully concealed" by the gelatin.

== Manufacturing and tourism ==
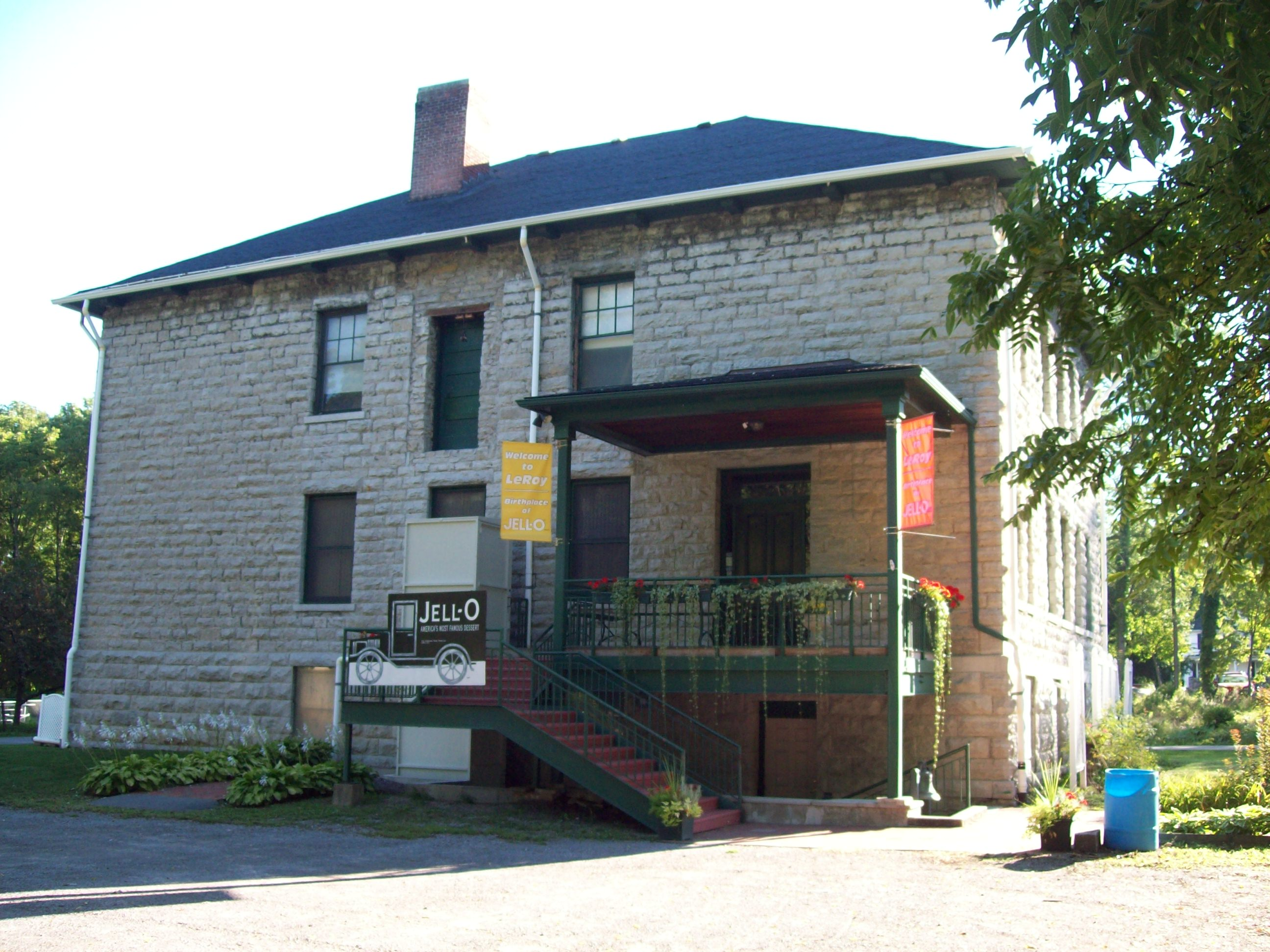
Jell-O Museum in LeRoy, New York

As of 2012, LeRoy, New York, is known as the home of Jell-O and has the only Jell-O museum in the world, located on the main road through the small town. Jell-O was manufactured here until General Foods closed the plant in 1964 and relocated manufacturing to Dover, Delaware. The Jell-O Gallery museum is operated by the Le Roy Historical Society at the Le Roy House and Union Free School, listed on the National Register of Historic Places in 1997.

At the museum, visitors can learn about the history of the dessert from its inception. Visitors starting on East Main Street, follow Jell-O Brick Road, whose stones are inscribed with the names of former factory employees. The museum offers looks at starting materials for Jell-O, such as sturgeon bladder and calves' hooves, and various molds.

The Jell-O plant (Kraft Heinz) in Mason City, Iowa, produces America's supply of ready-to-eat Jell-O gelatin dessert and pudding cups.

== Advertising ==
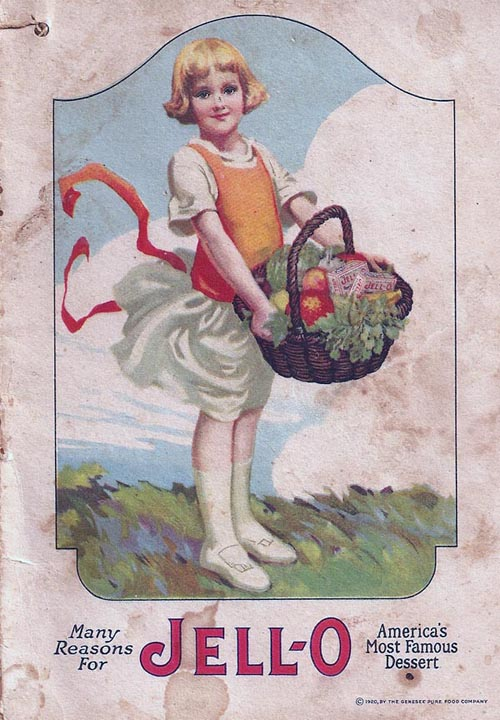
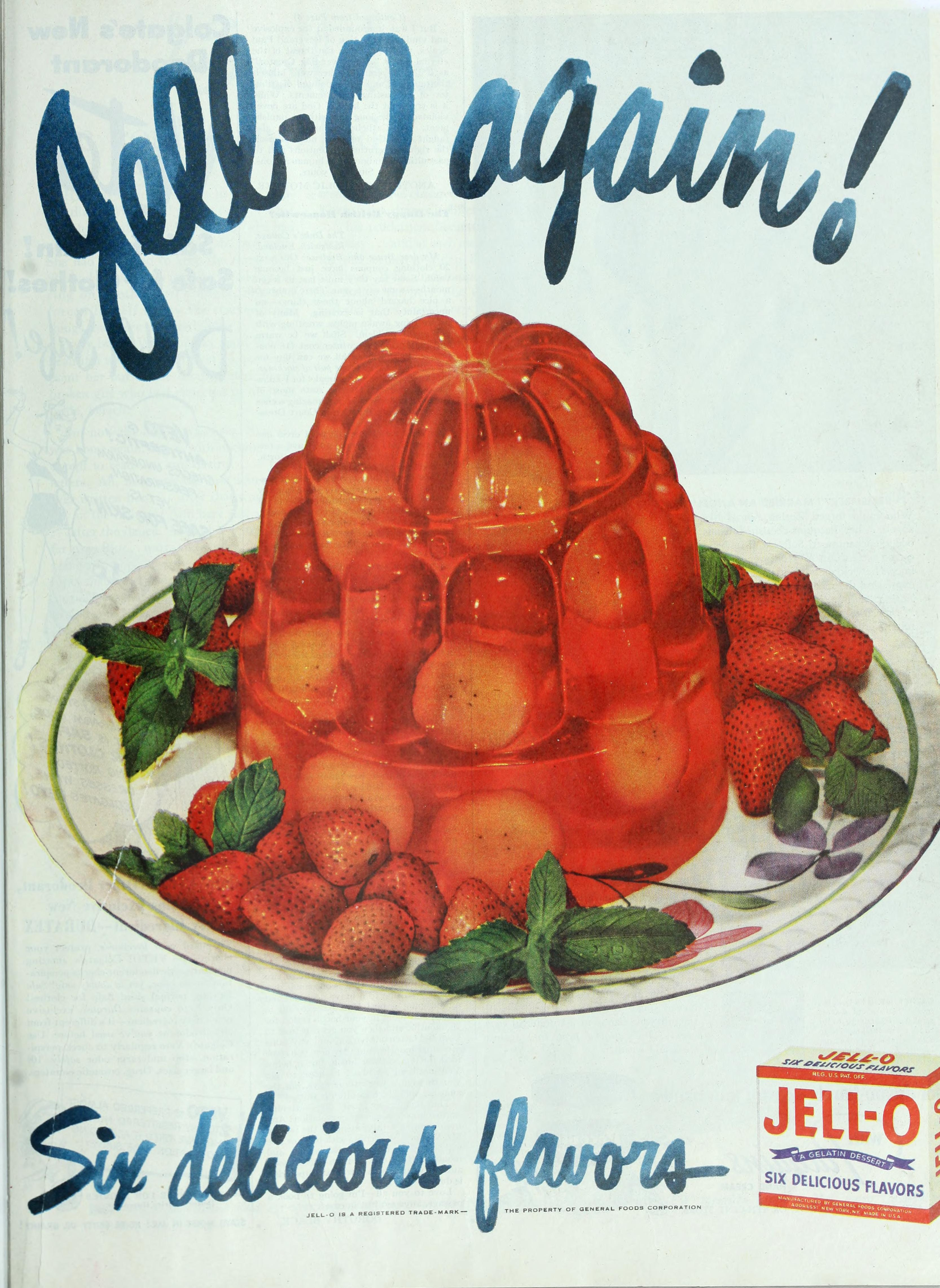
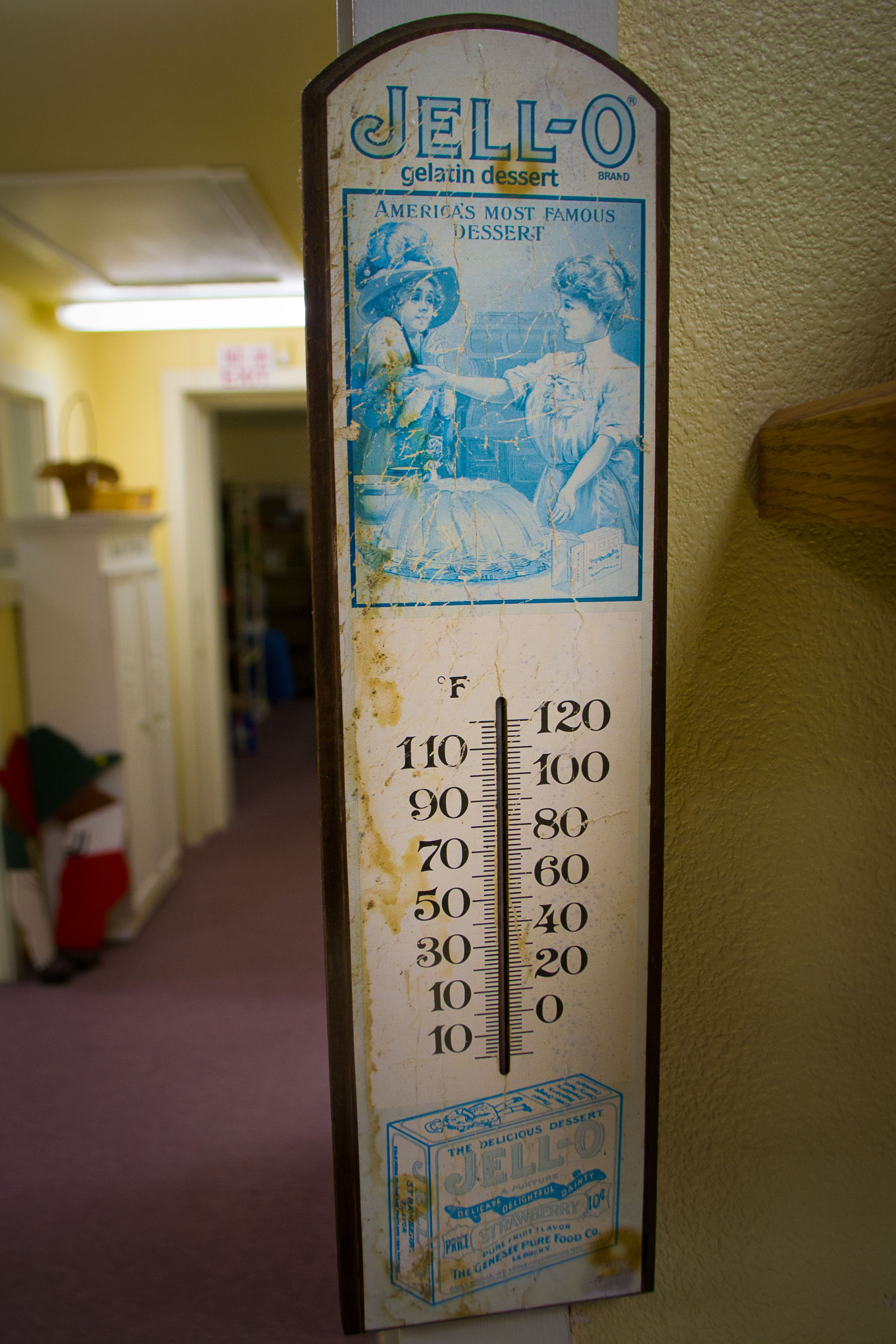
(Left) 1920 Jell-O recipe pamphlet featuring the "Jell-O Girl"; (center): 1948 ad published in The Ladies' Home Journal; (right): a Jell-O thermometer

Jell-O's early advertising campaign, initially directed by William E. Humelbaugh and later Frank LaBounty, first appeared in the Ladies' Home Journal in 1904. The print ads were often accompanied by recipes and color illustrations and became very popular. Artists such as Rose O'Neill, Maxfield Parrish, Coles Phillips, Norman Rockwell, Linn Ball, and Angus MacDonall contributed to the campaign. Franklin King, working for ad agency Dauchy Company, depicted his daughter Elizabeth in many of the illustrations, making her the recognizable "Jell-O Girl".

Jack Benny's top-rated radio program began its Jell-O sponsorship in 1934. The show did not break for commercials; instead, announcer Don Wilson incorporated speeches about Jell-O into the program at appropriate places, to Jack's feigned comic annoyance. The first show originated the five-note "J-E-L-L-O!" jingle retained in Jell-O's later advertising. Lucille Ball's My Favorite Husband, the radio predecessor to TV's I Love Lucy, was another popular program sponsored by Jell-O for much of its 124-episode run, beginning January 7, 1949. Ball's character Liz Cooper often opened the program with the lively greeting, "Jell-O, everybody!"

Comedian Bill Cosby was associated with Jell-O and, more famously, Jell-O pudding, and he appeared in many commercials promoting both before he was later dismissed due to the accusations in 2014. Later shows like Mad TV, The Simpsons and Saturday Night Live parody Cosby, using Jell-O references like "pudding pop". In the 1960s, the cast of the sitcom Hogan's Heroes did a commercial with Carol Channing featuring Colonel Hogan, his men, Kommandant Klink and Sergeant Shultz having Jell-O and Dream Whip for dessert. Also, in the first few seasons of the first of Lucille Ball's two 1960s television series, The Lucy Show, cast members including Vivian Vance often did commercials for Jell-O.

In 1995, Jell-O carried the tagline "It's alive!" and had the phrase "J-E-L-L-OOOOOOO!".

In August 2018, Jell-O released an animated series on YouTube and Amazon Prime Video titled "JELL-O Wobz" in partnership with DreamWorksTV.

In 2023, Jell-O updated the brand design for the first time in a decade, making it more playful. The logo became bolder and blockier, and hyper-realistic images of pudding and jelly fruit appeared.

In September 2024, Jell-O launches The Jelly Collection inflatable furniture series inspired by the iconic Jell-O molds.

== In culture ==
Jell-O is mentioned in the 1936 popular song "A Fine Romance" by Dorothy Fields (with music by Jerome Kern), where it is humorously referred to as a mundane alternative to the excitement of romantic love. In 1980, the American composer William Bolcom wrote a popular humorous song about Jell-O, "Lime Jello Marshmallow Cottage Cheese Surprise", satirising its use in combined sweet and savory dishes such as Jello salad.

In 1992, Ivette Bassa won the second ever Ig Nobel Prize in chemistry for inventing blue Jell-O.

The rock group Green Jellÿ was originally named Green Jellö, but had to change their name due to a lawsuit by Kraft Foods which claimed that the band was infringing the trademark for Jell-O.

=== Mormonism ===
Jell-O is especially popular among Mormons, so much so that the Mormon Corridor region is nicknamed the Jell-O Belt. Jell-O was recognized in 2001 as "a favorite snack food of Utah" by the Utah Senate, observing that Utah had had the highest per-capita consumption of Jell-O for many years, and how citizens of Utah had rallied to "Take Back the Title" after Des Moines, Iowa, exceeded Utah in Jell-O consumption in 1999. The culture of Utah, petitions by Utahns, and campaigning by students of Brigham Young University were also mentioned as reasons for recognizing Jell-O. Bill Cosby, longtime spokesperson for the Jell-O brand, appeared before the Utah Legislature in support of the resolution. "He told the assembly that he believes the reason people in Utah love Jell-O is that the snack is perfect for families – and the people of Utah are all about family."

The stereotype of Mormons loving Jell-O does not have a long history. Media reports in 1969 and 1988 on foods popular among Mormons or in Utah make no mention of Jell-O, and a 1988 article mentions Jell-O as a Lutheran tradition. In the late 1980s, Jell-O had a marketing campaign promoting the snack and its Jigglers recipe as fun for children and easy for parents, which played well among family-oriented Mormons. In 1997, Kraft released sales figures revealing Salt Lake City to have the highest per-capita Jell-O consumption.

== Current flavors ==
The following are the flavors of Jell-O products that are currently being produced:

=== Gelatin ===
- Apricot
- Berry Blue
- Black Cherry^{a}
- Cherry^{a}
- Cranberry
- Grape
- Lemon^{a}
- Lime^{a}
- Mango
- Orange^{a}
- Peach^{a}
- Pineapple
- Raspberry^{a}
- Strawberry^{a}
- Strawberry-Banana^{a}
- Watermelon

=== Pudding ===
- Banana Cream^{a}
- Boston Cream Pie^{c}
- Butterscotch^{a}
- Cheesecake^{a}
- Chocolate^{a}
- Chocolate Fudge^{a}
- Chocolate-Vanilla Swirl^{c}
- Coconut Cream
- Crème brûlée^{c}
- Dark Chocolate^{c}
- Double Chocolate^{c}
- Dulce De Leche^{a}^{c}
- French Vanilla
- Lemon^{a}
- Oreo Cookies 'n Creme
- Pistachio^{a}
- Pumpkin Spice^{b}
- Rice Pudding
- Strawberry Cheesecake^{c}
- Tapioca
- Vanilla^{a}
- White Chocolate^{a}

^aAlso available in a sugar free/low calorie product.
^bAvailable seasonally.
^cOnly available as a prepared product.

== See also ==
- Aeroplane Jelly
- Aspic
- Götterspeise
- Jell-O Museum
- Jello Biafra
- Jello salad
- Green Jellö
