= Jello salad =

Dish made with flavored gelatin and fruit

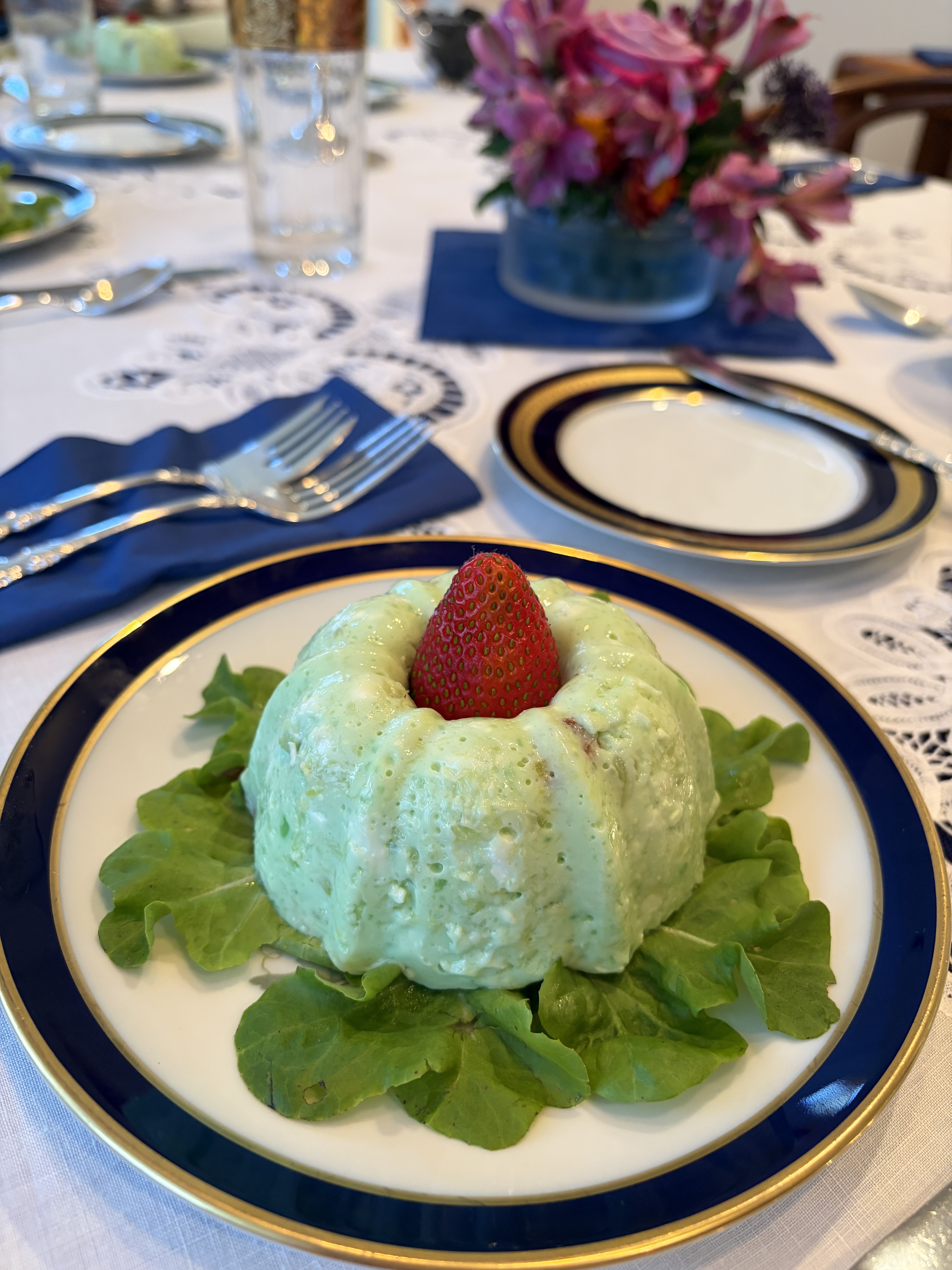
- Lime jello salad
- Alternative names: Gelatin salad, jelly salad, congealed salad, molded salad
- Type: Salad
- Course: Dessert, side dish, snack
- Place of origin: United States
- Region or state: Pennsylvania
- Created by: Mrs. John E. Cook
- Serving temperature: Chilled–room temperature
- Main ingredients: Flavored gelatin (often gelatin dessert) and fruit
- Variations: Adding grated carrots or other vegetables (aspic)

Jello salad is an American salad made with flavored gelatin, fruit, and sometimes grated carrots or (more rarely) other vegetables. Other ingredients may include cottage cheese, cream cheese, marshmallows, nuts, or pretzels. Jello salads were popular in the early 20th century and are now considered retro.

Because of its many elements, the result has speckled bits of interior color against a colored gelatin background, and so the dish can be appreciated for its colorful visual appeal. For example, a jello salad might have green from a lime-flavored gelatin, brown from nuts or pretzels, white from bits of cottage cheese, and red and orange from fruit cocktail. Therefore, it has a "salad appearance" (small pieces of food) although it is held firm in gelatin (like aspic). The "salad" theme is more pronounced in variants containing mayonnaise, or another salad dressing. When the dish has plain gelatin instead of sweetened gelatin, the use of vegetables is more common (e.g. tomato aspic).

== History ==
Early gelatin-based precursors to the jello salad included fruit and wine jellies and decorative aspic dishes, which were made with commercial or homemade gelatin. Gelatin was time-consuming to cook, and commercial gelatin was produced in shreds or strips until the late 19th century and needed to be soaked for a long time before use. In 1894, the Knox Company produced the first commercial granulated gelatin, followed by Jell-O a few years later. The name "jello salad" is derived from the genericization of the Jell-O brand name. The convenience of jello made gelatin-based dishes easier to prepare at home, compared to early jellies and aspics.

One of the earliest examples of jello salad is Perfection Salad, developed by Mrs. John E. Cook of New Castle, Pennsylvania in 1904. The original salad called for chopped cabbage, celery and red peppers in a plain aspic mold. Perfection Salad won third prize in a Better Homes and Gardens recipe contest and popularized the concept of the jello salad in the United States. Jello acted as an easy and cheap addition to more labor-intensive or expensive recipes during the Great Depression and World War II. The release of lime-flavored Jell-O during the Great Depression heightened the popularity of savory jello salads.

Jello salads were especially fashionable in the suburbs in the 1950s. They were seen as a marker of sophistication, elegance and status, indicating that a housewife had time to prepare jello molds and that her family could afford a refrigerator. In response to the mid-century popularity of jello salads, Jell-O released several savory flavors, including seasoned tomato and celery.

Jello salad fell out of fashion in the 1960s and 70s. The rise of Julia Child and the popularization of French cooking in the United States made the jello salad appear less elegant, and dieting trends eventually turned against sugary food like Jell-O. Jello salad is now most popular in rural areas of the upper Midwest and in Utah, where Jell-O is the official state snack.

== Varieties ==
Jello salad can be either savory or sweet. Sweet jello salads commonly include fresh fruits, fruit cocktail, nuts, marshmallows and whipped cream. Savory jello salad ingredients include vegetables, olives, nuts, meat, seafood and boiled eggs, with tomato juice, lemon juice or vinegar added to the gelatin for flavoring.

== See also ==
- Aspic, a savory gelatin dish
- Seafoam salad, a type of jello salad
- Frogeye salad, a sweet pasta salad
- Watergate salad, dessert salad with pistachio pudding
- Ambrosia salad, a fruit salad
- Frozen salad
- "Lime Jello Marshmallow Cottage Cheese Surprise", a humorous song about a specific type of gelatin salad (1980)
- Poke cake, a cake made with Jello
