= Joan Morris =

American mezzo-soprano and cabaret singer (born 1943)

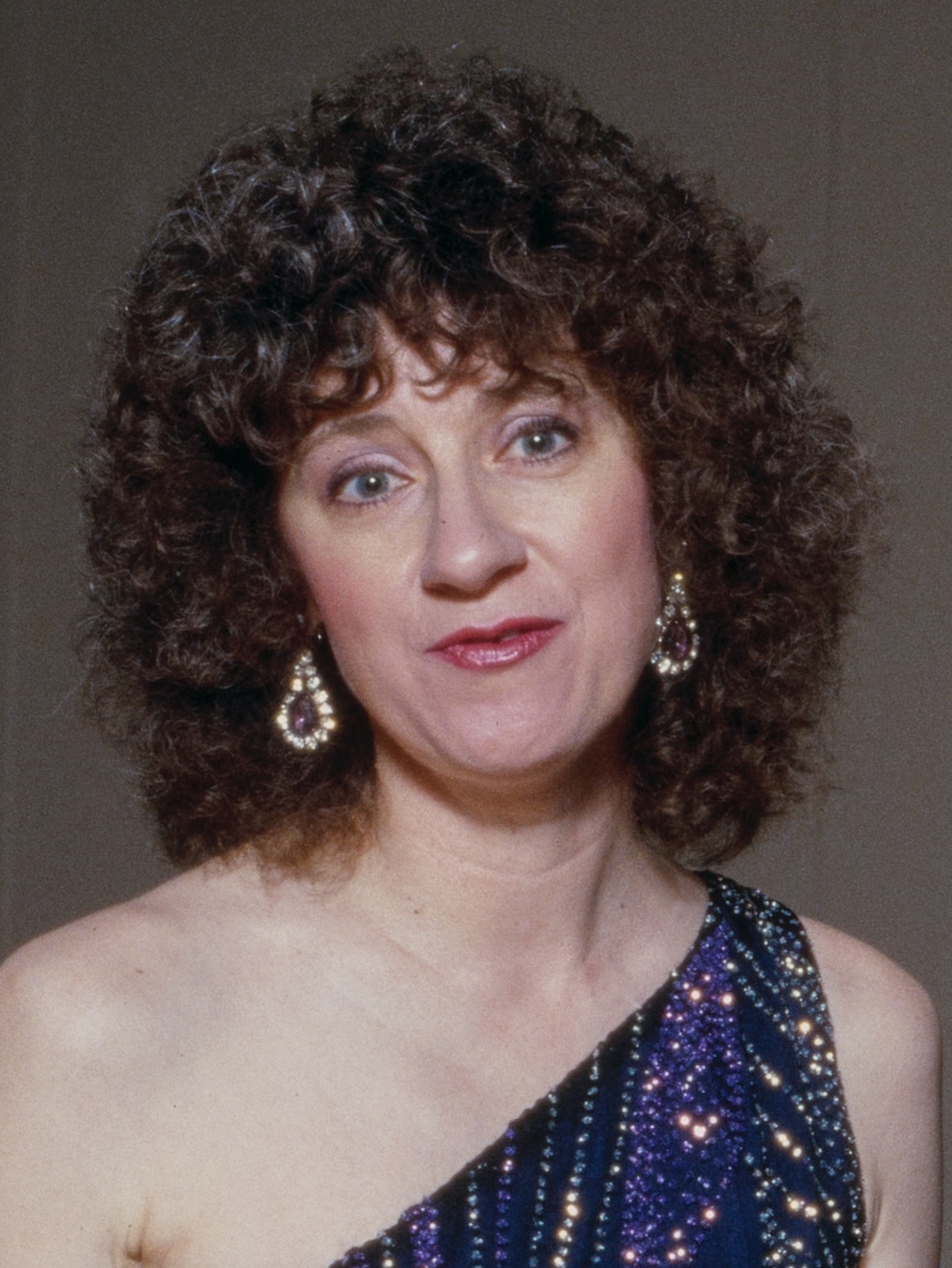
Morris at The Town Hall in 1985

Joan Morris (born February 10, 1943) is an American mezzo-soprano and cabaret singer.

== Life and career ==
Born in Portland, Oregon, her musical partner and husband is composer/pianist William Bolcom. The couple specializes in older popular songs, primarily from the first half of the 20th century, but extending beyond that to include both contemporary cabaret, popular songs of the Gay Nineties, and a number of songs dating back to the 1860s.

Their recordings for Nonesuch, RCA, Columbia and Arabesque include songs by the great songwriters of the 1920s and 30s such as Kern, Gershwin, Porter, and Rodgers and Hart. They also have performed and recorded songs by the rock-and-roll team of Jerry Leiber and Mike Stoller.

Together, they have taught at the University of Michigan for many years. Morris' performance style is nuanced and vibrant, and she is noted for honoring original versions of songs with historical accuracy. In early 2015 she announced that she and Bolcom would begin to curtail both the length and number of their concerts, offering the next year as an ad hoc "Farewell Tour" after which they would limit performances to "cameo appearances"..

2018 saw the publication of "Let Me Sing and I'm Happy," a brief memoir of her singing career and handbook of her approaches to song interpretation and performance.

== Select discography ==
- After the Ball: A Treasury of Turn-of-the-Century Popular Songs, Nonesuch Records, 1974, H-71304 (Grammy Nominated)
- Who Shall Rule This American Nation? (with Clifford Jackson and The Camerata Chorus, Nonesuch, 1976
- Vaudeville: Songs of The Great Ladies of The Musical Stage, Nonesuch, 1976
- Wild About Eubie (With Eubie Blake), Columbia, 1977
- These Charming People (with Max Morath), RCA Red Seal, 1978
- Songs By George and Ira Gershwin, Nonesuch, 1978
- The Girl On The Magazine Cover, RCA, 1979
- Blue Skies, Nonesuch, 1979
- Other Songs By Leiber and Stoller, Nonesuch, 1980
- The Rodgers and Hart Album (with Lucy Simon), RCA, 1981
- More Rodgers and Hart (with Max Morath), RCA, 1983
- Silver Linings, Arabesque, 1984
- Black Max: The Cabaret Songs of Arnold Weinstein and William Bolcom, RCA, 1985
- Lime Jello: An American Cabaret, RCA, 1986
- Let's Do It, Omega, 1989
- Night and Day, Omega, 1993
- Fountain Favorites From The World of Coca-Cola (with Max Morath), Coke, 1994
- Orchids In The Moonlight, Arabesque, 1996
- The Carioca, Arabesque, 1997
- Moonlight Bay, Albany, 1999
- Bolcom and Morris Sing Yip Harburg (with Max Morath), Original Cast, 2003
- Bolcom and Morris Sing Gus Kahn (with Max Morath), Original Cast, 2004
- Someone Talked!, Equilibrium, 2009
- Autumn Leaves, White Pine Records, 2015

== Sources ==
- Profile, FilmReference.com; accessed May 30, 2016.
