= Lime Jello Marshmallow Cottage Cheese Surprise =

1980 novelty song by William Bolcom and Joan Morris

- by William Bolcom
- Cover of the vocal score
- Key: B♭ major
- Year: 1980
- Genre: Novelty song
- Publisher: Edward B. Marks Music
- Scoring: Voice and piano
- Vocal: Joan Morris

"Lime Jello Marshmallow Cottage Cheese Surprise" is a satirical novelty song by the American composer William Bolcom. It is written for voice and piano, and Bolcom frequently performs it with his mezzo-soprano wife, Joan Morris, accompanying her on the piano. Composed in 1980, it is based on his experiences, in his youth, of playing the piano for women's clubs, and being fed absurd and unappetizing cuisine, including foods resembling Jello salad.

An accomplished classical composer and winner of the Pulitzer Prize for Music, Bolcom has written a number of cabaret songs which he has recorded with Morris on a series of 25 albums. "Lime Jello Marshmallow Cottage Cheese Surprise" is particularly noted as an example of his trenchant sense of humor.

Bolcom has stated that "Lime Jello Marshmallow Cottage Cheese Surprise" was originally written as a novelty piece to be performed in encores. The song featured at the end of concerts all over the US and Europe, always to an enthusiastic audience response. In response to public demand, Bolcom and Morris eventually recorded the song as part of an album of cabaret songs in 1986.

== Performance ==
Bolcom’s song is meant to be sung in the style of an overbearing, middle-class housewife from the American Midwest who is presiding at a meeting of a ladies' club. The singer describes a menu of dishes (intended by the singer to be seen as gastronomically bizarre) to be served at the club's "culture night".

== Explanation ==
The song's humor centers on the ingredients of the title dish—lime-flavored Jell-O, marshmallows and cottage cheese—which, it is implied, are a combination of incompatible sweet and savory foodstuffs, but could actually make up a type of jello salad. The concoction also theoretically includes "slices of pimento (you won't believe your eyes)", pineapple, mayonnaise, and vanilla wafers—all of which poke fun of something akin to a seafoam salad.

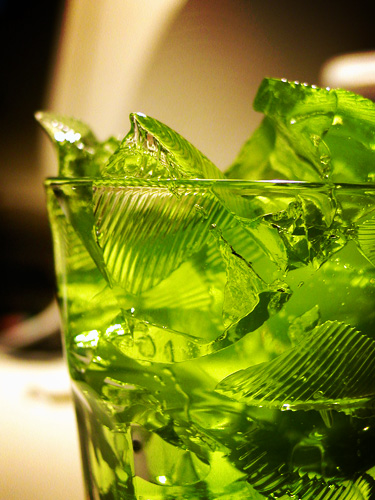
Green Jell-O

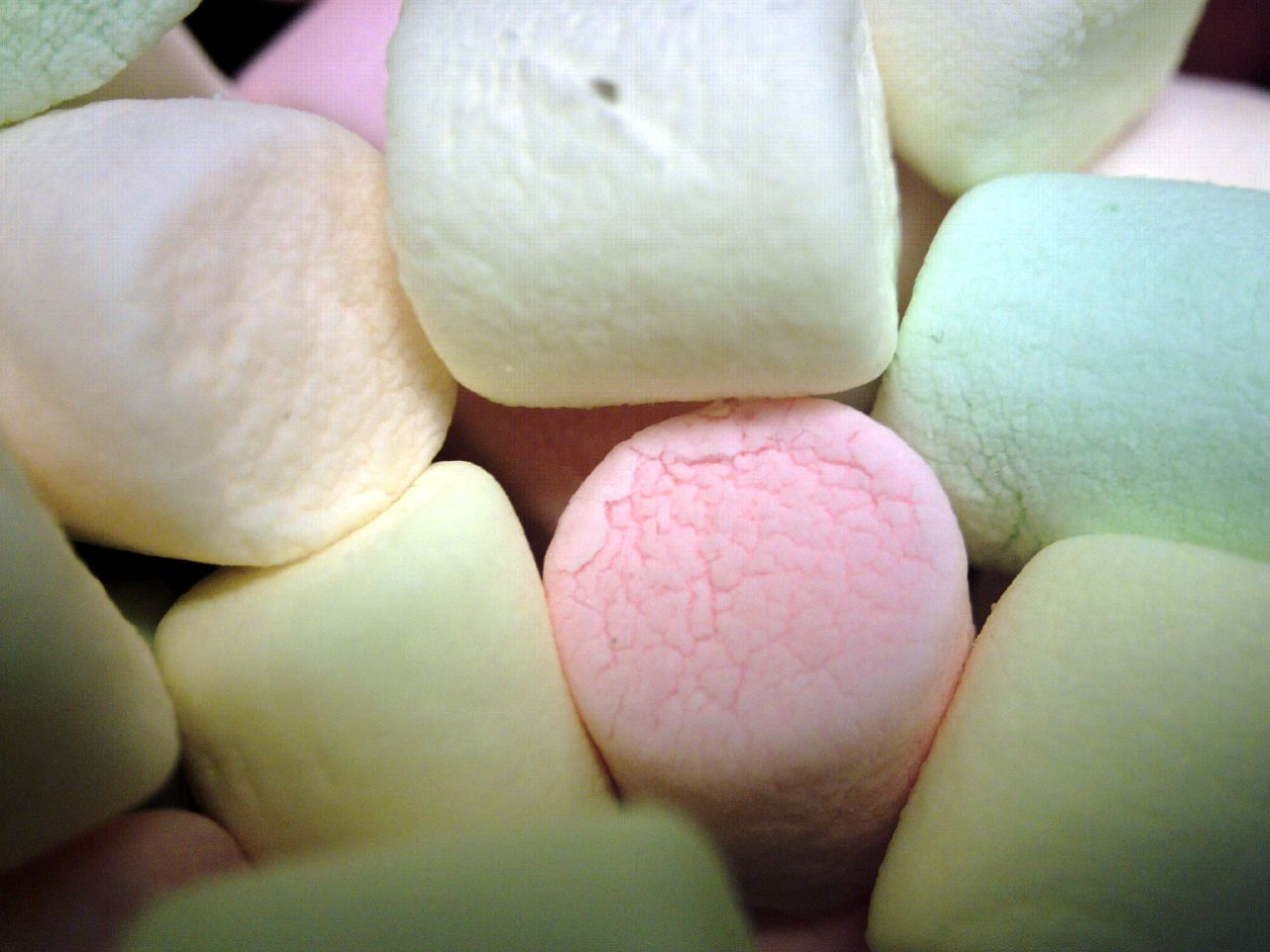
Marshmallows

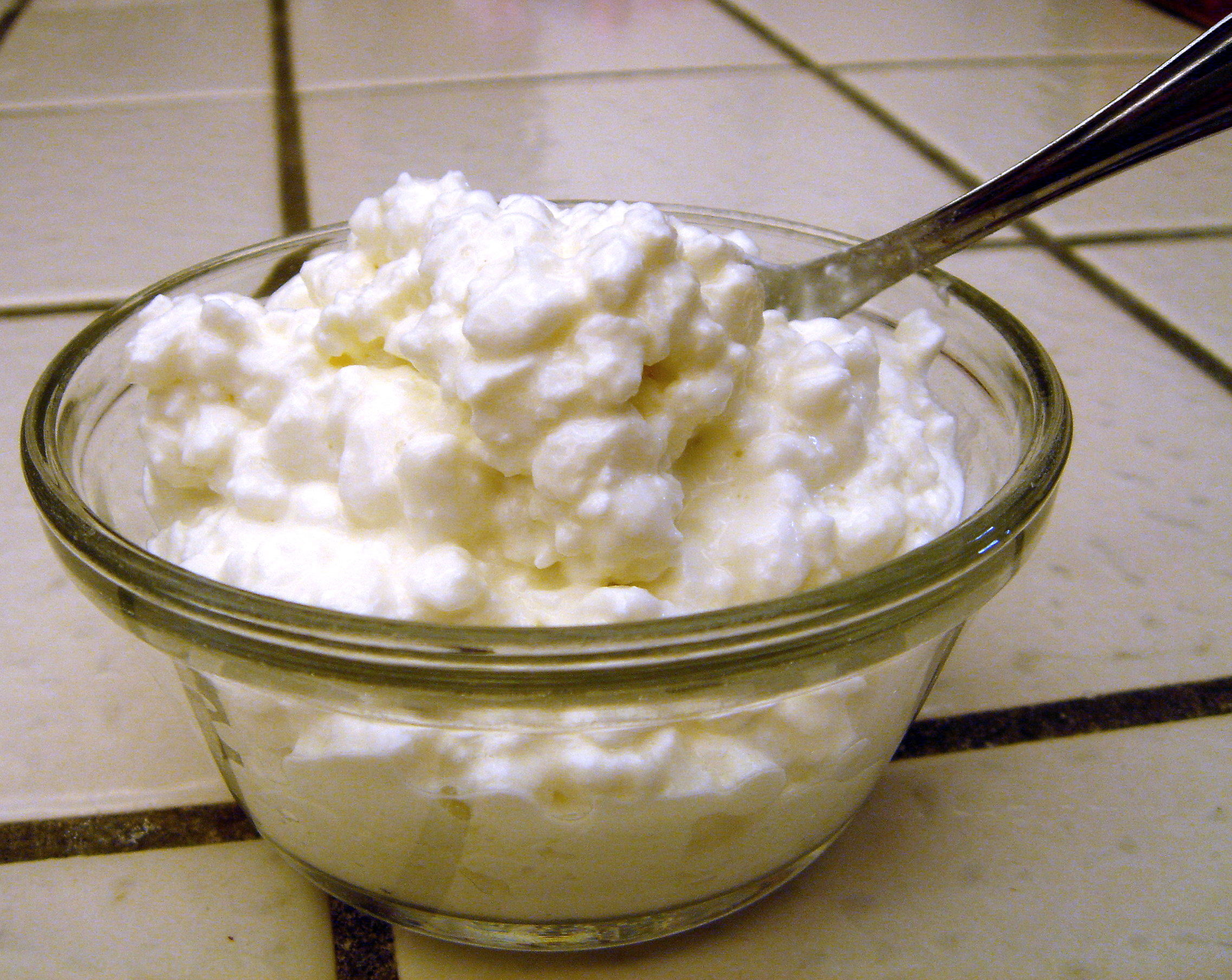
Cottage cheese

Other dishes mentioned include "scones that are filled with peanut mousse" and "strawberry ice enshrined in rice with bits of tunafish".

== Critical assessment ==
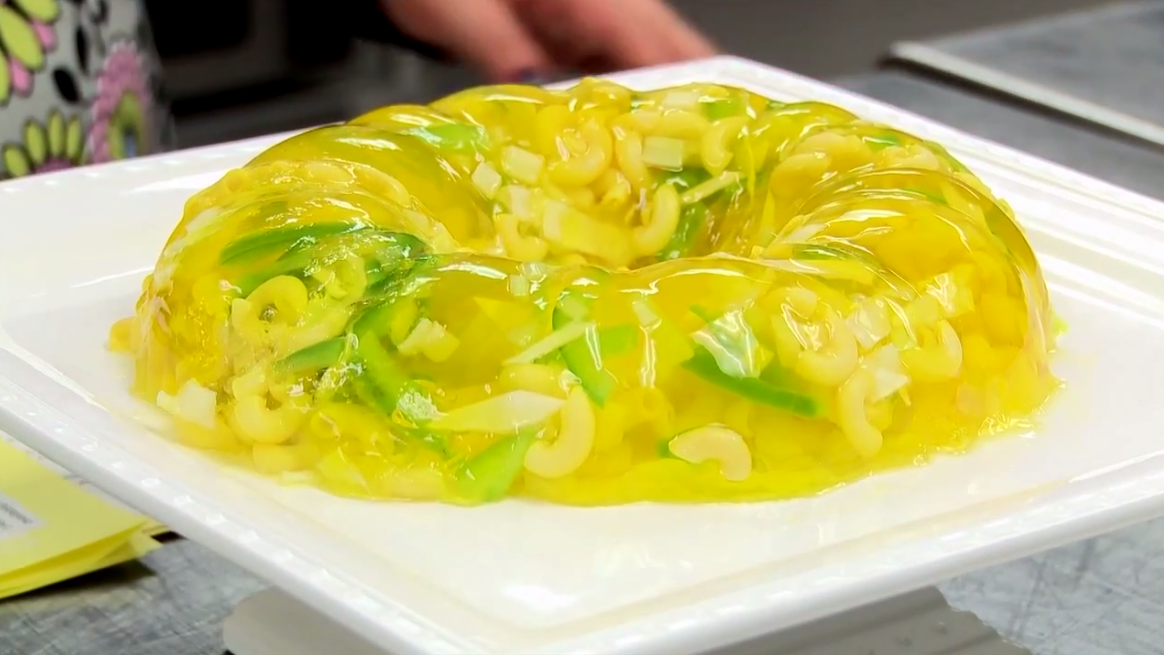
An example of a sweet & savory jelly dish typical of the cuisine satirised in the song. This example includes a variety of vegetables and macaroni pasta.

The role of "feminized food production" in Bolcom's song has been compared with the assessment of Jell-O dishes in writings by cultural critics such as Roland Barthes, James Lileks and Wendy Wall, who link the popularity of jelly-based cuisine with gender identity and consumerism. While the visual and culinary aesthetics of Jell-O salad are critiqued in prose or satirical song, the role of women in food preparation is nevertheless an integral part of the portrayal.

In the song, the singer's defensive assertion, "I did not steal the recipe, it's lies, I tell you, lies!" parodies claims of originality and intellectual property in regard to food recipes.

== Recordings ==
- Lime Jello- An American Cabaret — Bolcom & Morris (RCA, 1986)
- Out and About...with William Bolcom, Cole Porter, Percy Grainger and More — Lesley Pryde and Laura Leon (Musical Tapestries, 2001)
- Blah blah blah and other Trifles — Sarah Walker and Roger Vignoles (Helios, 2012)

== See also ==
- List of compositions by William Bolcom
