= Seafoam salad =

Type of lime jello salad

- Type: Dessert
- Place of origin: United States
- Created by: F. W. Woolworth Company
- Main ingredients: Lime-flavoured gelatin, cream cheese, pears, maraschino cherries, whipped cream
- Variations: Orange salad (orange-flavoured gelatin)

Seafoam salad (made with lime-flavored jello), also known as orange salad (made with orange-flavored jello), is a cafeteria and buffet staple popularized by F. W. Woolworth's lunch counters. Seafoam salad is often considered a dessert because of its sweetness, and so is one of many dessert salads. It is composed of green lime-flavored gelatin, cream cheese, pears, maraschino cherries, and whipped topping.

Multiple versions of the recipe exist; variations include substituting crushed pineapple for the pears, or adding mayonnaise and nuts to the mixture, thereby making it less sweet.

== See also ==
- Frogeye salad
- Fruit salad
- Jello salad
- Lime Jello Marshmallow Cottage Cheese Surprise
- List of desserts
- List of salads
