= Rocky Mountain cuisine =

Culinary traditions of the Rocky Mountain region

Rocky Mountain cuisine is a cuisine of Alberta and British Columbia in Canada; Idaho, Colorado, Wyoming, Utah and Montana in the United States. Some distinguishing dishes include bison and Rocky Mountain oysters, or prairie oysters as they are known in Canada.

== Description ==
The roots of Rocky Mountain cuisine go back to the history of the Rocky Mountains. The railways brought the best of Victorian kitchens and recreated lavish menus for their lodges. Meanwhile, mountain guides from Switzerland, Austria and Germany were learning from the native people how to cook and appreciate local foods. Learning the art of curing and smoking game and fish helped people survive the long mountain winters. Game meats are suited for cooking quickly over the high heat of a grill or wok, stir-fried or roasted and served with a light sauce, salad and vegetables.

Current trends are largely farm-to-table throughout the region.

== Alberta ==
Alberta beef is a staple for the northern region with worldwide recognition for its quality and tenderness, prepared in a variety of ways, barbecuing, braising, grilling, skewering, and most notably served as steaks. Bison, elk, caribou, wild boar, venison and pheasant also feature locally.

The province grows many local grains used in different foods and drinks. Alberta is also the fifth-largest honey-producing region in the world, producing 18 million pounds of honey annually. During the fall, the cold nights also cause root vegetables to concentrate causing them to taste sweeter.

Alberta is also known for its growing craft-beer and alcohol industry with microbreweries located in both urban and rural areas around the province. A variety of microbreweries, distilleries, meaderies, and fruit wineries can be found throughout the province.

The city of Calgary is also the birthplace of the Caesar, a cocktail consisting of vodka mixed with clam-infused tomato juice, lime, hot sauce and Worcestershire sauce, with a celery-salt rim. Michael Chell created the cocktail to celebrate the 1969 opening of the Calgary Inn's new restaurant, Marco's Italian. Inspired by his favourite Italian dish, spaghetti vongole, Chell set out to create a cocktail that would capture the pasta's hearty clam and tomato flavours. The drink is popular across Canada but can be compared to the more widely known Bloody Mary cocktail.

Calgary is also thought to be the origin of the Canadian-Chinese dish ginger beef.

Local meats and produce can be found throughout the numerous farmers' markets located in major cities, with some being open year-round.

Festivals happen throughout the province to promote local food and drink with the most notable events being the Taste of Edmonton and Taste of Calgary festivals, Calgary International Beerfest, and the Calgary Stampede.

== See also ==
- Mormon foodways
- Cuisine of the Southwestern United States
