= McTeague (opera) =

McTeague is an American opera composed by William Bolcom with a libretto by Arnold Weinstein and Robert Altman. The opera is based on a novel of the same name by Frank Norris (written in 1895, published in 1899) which also served as the source material for the Erich von Stroheim film Greed (1924). The piece was written on commission for the Lyric Opera of Chicago and first performed there on October 31, 1992.

== Roles ==
Role	Voice type	Premiere cast, 31 October 1992 (Conductor: Dennis Russell Davies)
McTeague, an unlicensed dentist in San Francisco	tenor	Ben Heppner
Maria Miranda Macapa, McTeague's mentally ill cleaning lady	mezzo-soprano	Emily Golden
Marcus Schouler, a worker in a veterinary hospital and McTeague's friend	baritone	Timothy Nolen
Trina Sieppe, Marcus Schouler's cousin, later McTeague's wife	soprano	Catherine Malfitano
Sheriff	tenor	Patrick Denniston
Papa Sieppe, Trina's father	bass-baritone	William F. Walker
Mama Sieppe, Trina's mother	mezzo-soprano	Martha Jane Howe
Owgooste, Trina's younger brother	treble	John Capone
Lottery Agent/Health Inspector	bass	Wilbur Pauley
Dentist	baritone	Victor Benedetti
Waiters, guests, barbershop quartet, sheriff's posse
