= Mormon foodways =

Mormon food culture

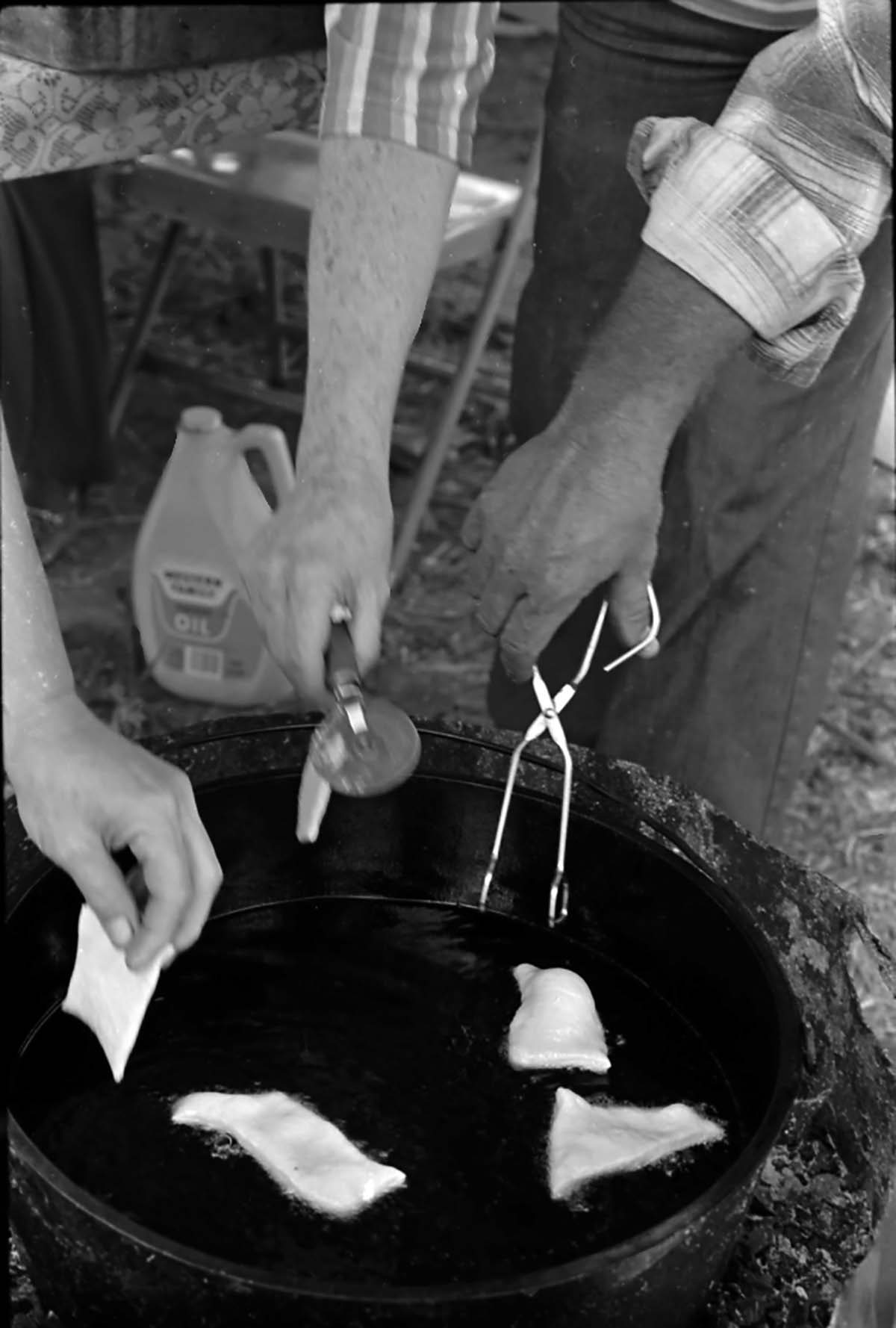
Utah scones (fry bread) cooking in oil

Mormon foodways encompass the traditional food and drink surrounding the religious and social practices of members of the Church of Jesus Christ of Latter-day Saints (LDS Church) and other churches in the Latter Day Saint movement, colloquially referred to as Mormons. The Word of Wisdom prohibits Mormons from consuming alcohol, coffee, and tea. These restrictions began to be observed more closely in the 20th century. Traditionally, members are encouraged to fast two meals during the first Sunday of each month.

LDS foodways in Nauvoo, Illinois, were similar to surrounding frontier foodways. Brock Cheney argues that Mormon foodways in the west were distinct from those of miners, Native Americans, and other non-Mormons in the same area. Mormons used seasonal harvests, foraged food, and their New England and European backgrounds to make food. Mormon pioneers (hereafter referred to as "pioneers") used spices and tried to breed varieties of fruit, especially apples and peaches, that were well-suited to the surrounding climate. Pioneers learned what to forage from indigenous tribes, and relied on foraging in years of famine. They made their own sweeteners. Pioneers preserved fruit by drying it or canning it. They ate bread frequently, and communally butchered meat, which was preserved through smoking. Many pioneers immigrated from Europe, and brought food traditions from there, including making cheese and sauerkraut.

In the 21st century, Mormons share recipes to rotate their food storage, which often include processed foods. Food in the Mormon regional area (Idaho, Utah, and Arizona) is similar to Midwest comfort food, with Utah scones and funeral potatoes being unique to Utah. As the faith tradition becomes international, there is no longer a cuisine common to all members, but food remains an important feature of ward functions.

The term Mormon foodways is preferred over Mormon cuisine – even though the latter is in common use – because there have never been large differences between the foods eaten by American Mormons and those eaten by other Americans at the same time and place, and those smaller differences which have existed are not considered sufficient to constitute an independent cuisine. The term foodways is used in the social sciences to refer to overall food production, distribution, storage and consumption in a given society, culture, or subculture, which is the focus of this article. Cuisine has a narrower definition focused only on dishes, their ingredients and preparation methods.

== Dietary law, fasting, and sacrament bread ==
Section 89 of the Doctrine and Covenants, commonly known as the "Word of Wisdom" gives members dietary guidelines. It says to consume fruit seasonally, eat meat sparingly, and to eat grain, especially wheat, which is referred to as "the staff of life". The scripture prohibits consumption of alcohol, tobacco, and "hot drinks" (coffee and tea). The dietary restrictions in the Word of Wisdom were not consistently enforced until the 1900s, and in 1921 they became required for temple attendance. This increased enforcement in the 1920s coincided with the temperance movement, and perhaps grew from members of church leadership desiring approval from Protestants, who were generally for prohibition. Pioneers in the late 1800s drank coffee, tea, and distilled spirits like whiskey. Pioneers also grew herbs for tisanes, including peppermint, rose hip, jasmine, hops, and lemon balm. Christie Davies postulated that since coffee and tea are not obviously bad for health, avoiding them helps Mormons solidify a collective identity that in turn provides mental and physical health benefits. Abstaining from coffee and tea makes it more difficult to socialize with non-Mormons, further strengthening group identity.

The first Sunday of each month is designated for fasting, or refraining from eating or drinking, for two meals. Members often donate the money saved from not eating as a fast offering to help feed the poor in their area. Local lay leaders called bishops help distribute these funds in the form of food to local poor people through their bishop's storehouse. Young children and people with health issues do not usually fast.

Women baked bread for the sacrament in Kirtland, Ohio, and later in Utah in the 1890s. One woman would cut the crusts off the sacrament bread and transport it on a special crystal platter, creating her own ritual from domestic work. Pioneers ate bread for meals, sometimes softened with molasses, and made soup with dried bread.

== Foodways in Illinois ==
Mormon foodways in Illinois were similar to other frontier cuisines. Most settlers in Nauvoo could not afford cookstoves and used "spiders", also called bake ovens, which are similar to modern Dutch ovens. As many pioneers came from the Yankee Northeast, they called them bake ovens rather than Dutch ovens. Bake ovens allowed settlers to make bread without an oven. Some switched to stove cooking, while others continued cooking with bake ovens. The settlers in Nauvoo had access to food crops including apples, cucumbers, Indian corn, gooseberries, grapes, melons, oats, peaches, potatoes, pumpkins, rice, squash, tomatoes, and wheat. Women made maple syrup when the snow thawed and enjoyed fresh vegetables in the summer. Women made pickles and dried fruit for future use. Vegetables were expensive to buy, while meat was comparatively inexpensive. If a household had a cow, it was the duty of the woman of the house or a child to milk the cow.

== Foodways of the Utah pioneers ==
=== Foodstuffs/ingredients ===
Pioneers used heirloom breeds of crops and livestock. The first crop planted in Salt Lake Valley in 1847 was potatoes, followed by buckwheat, corn, oats, turnips, beans, and others. Peach pits and apple seeds were planted soon thereafter. Some pioneers brought seeds from other places, including club-head wheat, the California pea, and the now-extinct Garnet Chili potato. Onions were widely grown, but not garlic. Nutmeg was very popular, and cardamom, cinnamon, cloves, and black pepper were also used. Farmers, including Wilford Woodruff, strove to breed varieties of apples, peaches, and pears suited for Utah's climate. Livestock had multiple uses, with Shorthorn cattle lugging wagons and plows as well as providing milk and beef. The popular Spanish Churro sheep was used for both wool and mutton. By the turn of the century, more specialized breeds had replaced these. Lard was difficult to produce, but highly valued.

Wheat flour was scarce, and many pioneers used corn flour instead, since it was cheaper and easier to grow corn than wheat. Early grist mills, powered by water, provided a spectrum from whole-wheat to white flour (including middle types like Graham flour). Corn was easier to grow on undeveloped land and all social classes ate Hominy. Poor families gleaned wheat from fields.

Pioneers in 1847 learned about local foraging from indigenous tribes like the Goshutes. Pioneers ate wild sego bulbs, rose hips, berries, onions, nettles, amaranth, dandelion greens, wild mushrooms, and artichokes. They hunted elk, rabbit, sage hen, duck, trout, and salmon. When grasshoppers decimated crops in 1855, pioneers fished and stored millet and trout for their winter food supply. The types of wild berries they harvested were serviceberries, chokecherries, currants, raspberries, strawberries, elderberries, and gooseberries. Harvests varied depending on local rainfall and grasshopper infestations. During years of bad harvests, pioneers survived on what they could forage. Seasonal food included peas, radishes, and sego bulbs in the spring, lettuce, beans, and corn in the summer, and tomatoes, cabbages, carrots, and potatoes in the fall.

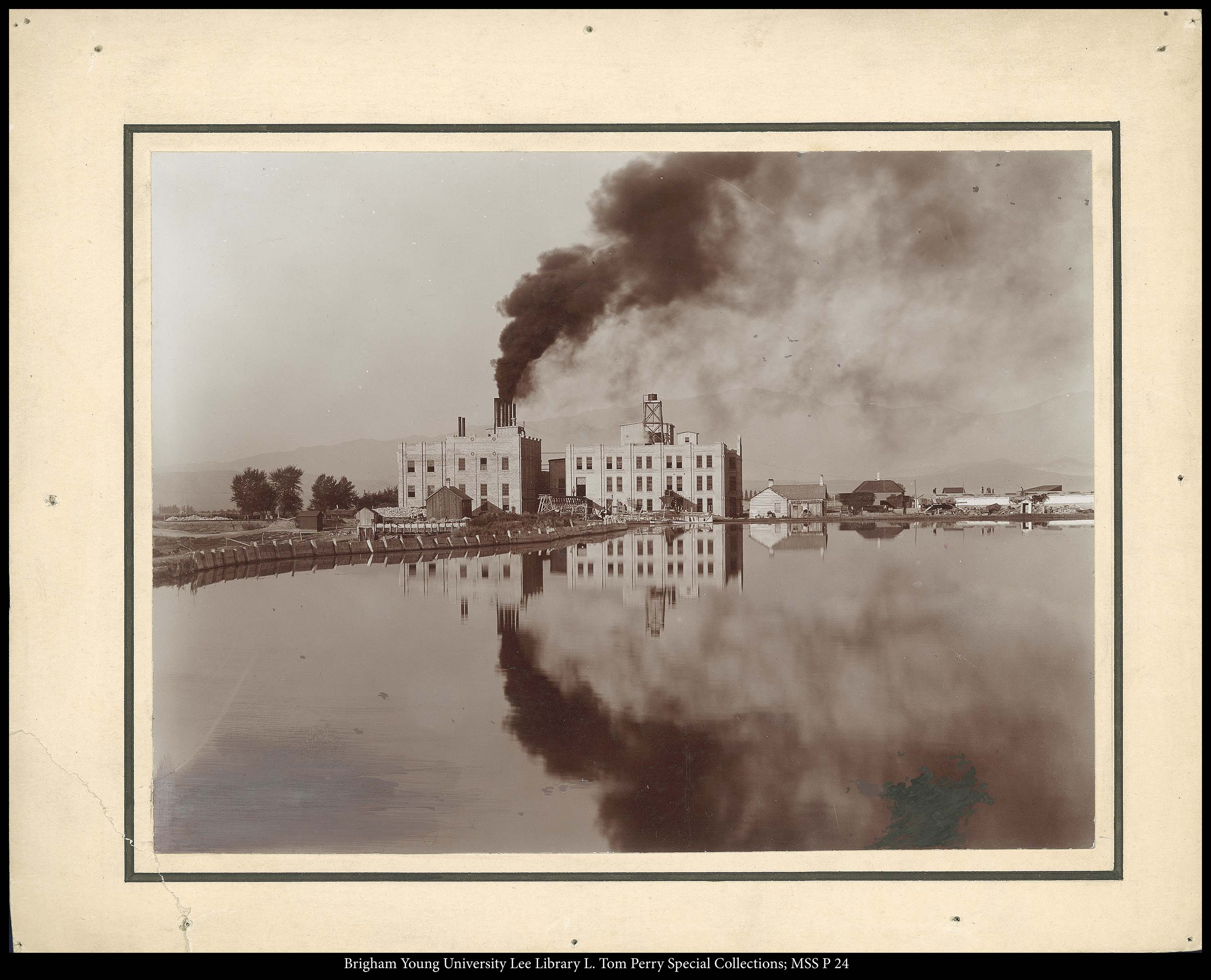
Utah Beet Sugar Works in Lehi

Brigham Young discouraged pioneers from buying imported sugar in an attempt to keep more cash within the borders of the Utah Territory. Brigham Young encouraged pioneers to plant sorghum cane and sugar beets, which they processed into molasses. Molasses was the main source of sweetening until a beet sugar factory was built in Lehi in 1890. Box elder tree sap was supposedly similar to sugar maple sap, and some pioneers washed sap off of cottonwood tree leaves and reduced it to a syrup. Pioneers used sweet ingredients like squash and berries to sweeten their cakes. Pioneers commonly had watermelon feasts to celebrate occasions.

Starting in 1853, pioneers could buy yeast from Salt Lake City's California Bakery. Sometimes one household would propagate yeast, giving it out in return for flour or sugar that could feed the yeast colony. Cider-making was a familiar practice to immigrants from New England, which also produced yeast as a byproduct. Pioneers also used sourdough starters. Pioneers made vinegar from pea shells or grapes.

=== Processing ===
Pioneers canned and dried fruit, storing enough to last two years. They stored preserved food in cellars and ate it during the winter. They dried fruit in large quantities, with one pioneer writing of inviting all the "young folks" to a "cutting bee" to prepare the fruit for drying. They traded dried fruit for flour or other items. In the 1860s, the LDS Church coordinated the sale of dried fruit, buying it from member farmers or accepting it as tithing and selling it to miners. Miners in Montana bought 200,000 pounds of dried fruit in 1864. Utah's cash-poor economy benefited from this rare export. Pioneers also dried squash, pumpkin, and melon. In the absence of apples, pioneers made squash butter, or a spreadable form of squash. Pioneers also preserved fruit in molasses syrup. When Mason jars were mass-produced in the 1860s, Utah women used them to preserve fruit.

Pioneer remains were found to have decayed teeth, which scholars attribute to their starchy diet. Most immigrant pioneers came from the United Kingdom and continued eating bread and potatoes as was popular there. Wheat flour made up the most weight in wagons travelling westward, where they leavened their bread with saleratus, a type of unrefined baking powder. Recipes from the pioneer era assumed bakers already knew how to make bread. Leaders of the church encouraged pioneers to save meat for the winter and eat fish and eggs in the summer, which was a common seasonal practice. Pigs were usually ready for slaughter in December.

To preserve meats, pioneers salted and dried fish in bulk. One pioneer woman used the salt from the Great Salt Lake to preserve her beef. Neighbors helped butcher a pig for winter consumption; ham, shoulders, bacon, and sausage were made from the carcass. In some places, neighbors were traditionally given a small amount of fresh meat. Pioneers smoked their own meat in a smokehouse or chimney. Pioneers also used alcohol in preservation but vinegar was more common. They used natural fermentation to make sauerkraut and cheese. Dairy products were a common bartering commodity. A Jersey cow could produce more milk than a family would use, so excess milk was made into cheese. Neighbors would take turns sharing fresh milk so that one family could make cheese in bulk to share. Home curing and fermentation, while common among pioneers, is not popular among members today.

=== Influence of European cuisine ===
A large number of pioneers were born outside the United States. In 1860, 22% of Utah residents were born in Britain, and 30,000 residents came from Scandinavia. By 1870, 37,000 European emigrants had settled in Utah. Immigrants brought their own food traditions, including cheese making and holiday pastries. Immigrants often continued the food traditions of their previous countries. Some Danish immigrants continued to drink coffee and English immigrants to drink tea, even though it was forbidden in the Word of Wisdom. Rye did not grow well in Utah, so immigrants made do with wheat bread. However, they still made dishes like the English Yorkshire Pudding, Danish Ableskiver, and German Sauerkraut.

Brigham Young used his wealth to provide himself and his family with exceptional food, both in type and quantity. He enjoyed donuts fried in lard, squab, and codfish gravy on a regular basis.

== Contemporary foodways ==
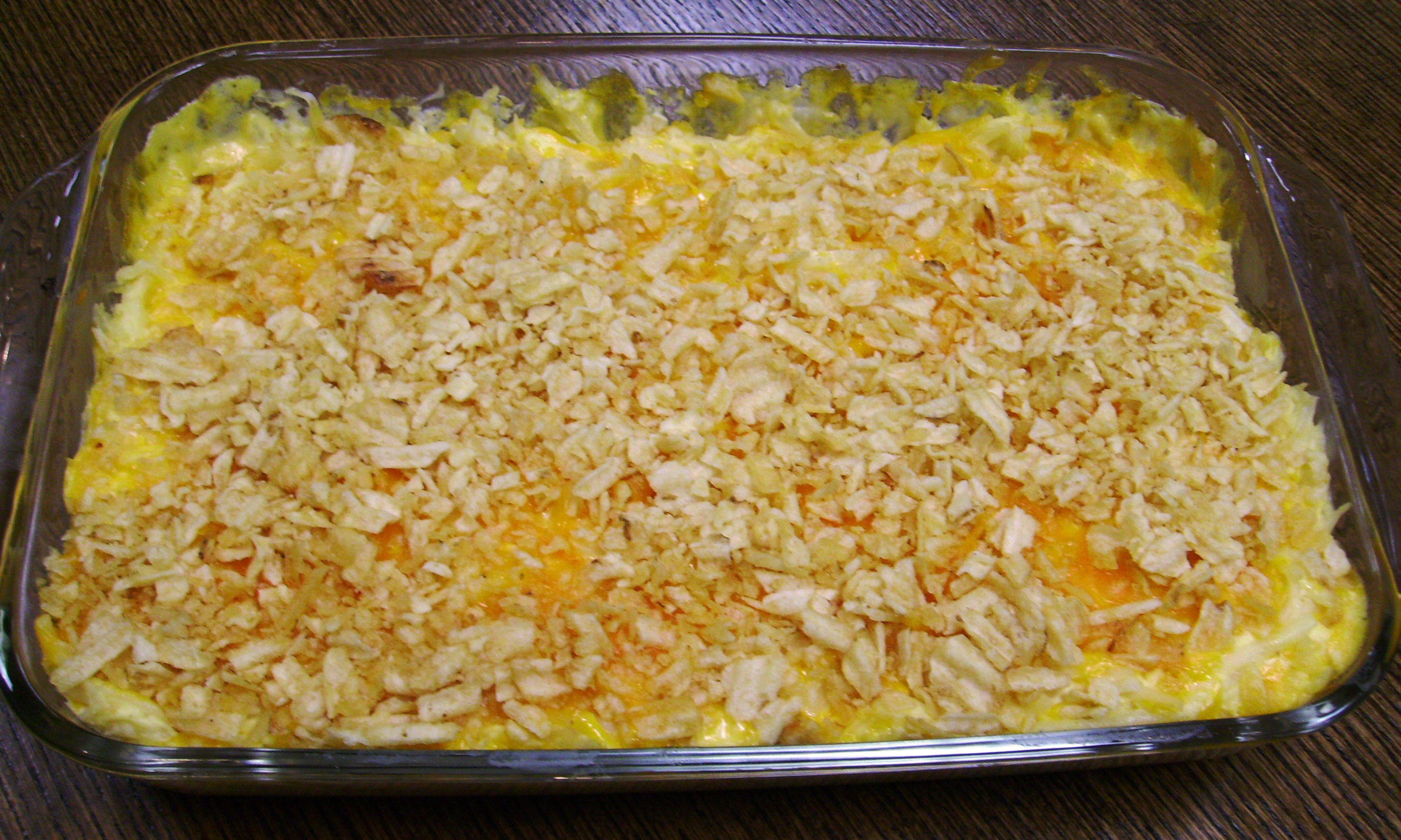
Funeral potatoes

Before 1950, it was common for church members to grow vegetables and fruit, can their own preserves, and make their own bread, pickles, and other food items. "From scratch" cooking is still traditional in some Mormon families, though after World War II, processed foods like canned soup, cake mixes, and gelatin became more common ingredients in cooking, and also a part of traditional food storage. Certain food storage staples spoil after several months or a year, and dedicated recipe books and blogs exist to help Mormon families rotate their food supply through everyday meals that make use of food storage ingredients. Some members disdain foods made from other processed foods. Leaders encourage members to store food for times of need, and baking is still popular among members today. One 2012 survey found that 58% of members had at least three months of food storage in their house. Members in the 1800s experienced many deprivations, including food shortages, which may have influenced their food storage practices.

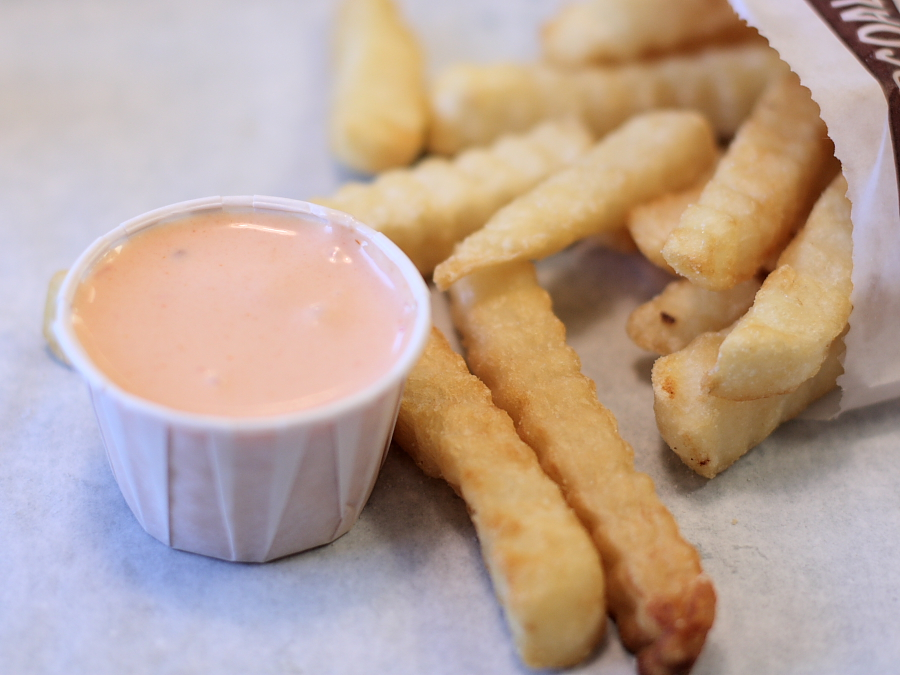
Fry sauce and french fries

Food common to the Mormon regional area is similar to Midwest comfort food, or "country home cooking". Eric Eliason, a folklorist specializing in Mormon traditions, says that Utah scones, funeral potatoes, and green Jell-O are distinctive to Utah. In the 1980s, Jell-O had a marketing campaign promoting the snack as fun for children and easy for parents, which played well among family-oriented Mormons. In 2001, lawmakers named Jell-O as "a favorite snack food of Utah". Dutch oven cooking is popular in the Rocky Mountain area, and food prepared in Dutch ovens isn't limited to stews but ranges from bread to roasts. Utah is the second-largest market for Rhodes brand dinner rolls, and in 2004, Salt Lake City consumed the most soda of any city, which many Mormons drink instead of alcohol. Seasonal food festivals abound in Utah, including Bear Lake's raspberry festival and Payson's onion days. Fry sauce "functions as a cultural identifier for Utahns", and it is popular with both Mormons and non-Mormons in the state.

Among Latter-day Saint families in Utah, families culturally privilege traditional gender roles where the father is the breadwinner and the mother is the main caretaker for the home and children. Parents are instructed to "help" one another, though the exact form of help is not defined. In one study, over half of Utah mothers worked outside the home. Members value men who can sacrifice themselves for church and family, as opposed to traditional masculinity, which values individuality and aggression. The same study found that women often managed the food work and assigned tasks to men. This gendered divide may help Mormons keep their cultural identity distinct from American culture. Utah fathers enjoyed grocery shopping and taking their family out to eat as their way of helping with food needs.

As church membership is increasingly international, there is no cuisine common to all members. Culturally, thriftiness and self-reliance are encouraged, which may make members worldwide more likely to cook at home. Church events around the world include food, especially ward dinners and funerals.

== See also ==
- Cuisine of the Southwestern United States
- Culture of The Church of Jesus Christ of Latter-day Saints
- Rocky Mountain cuisine

== Works cited ==
- Broomfield, Andrea (2015). "Mormon Food Practices". In Albala, Ken (ed.). The Sage Encyclopedia of Food Issues. Vol. 2. Sage reference.
- Cheney, Brock (2012). Plain but Wholesome: Foodways of the Mormon Pioneers. Salt Lake City, Utah: The University of Utah Press. ISBN 9781607812081.
- Christensen, Michael P. (2020). "Utah's Fry Sauce". In Edison, Carol A.; Eliason, Eric A.; McNeill, Lynne S. (eds.). This is the Plate: Utah Food Traditions. University of Utah Press. ISBN 9781607817406.
- Davies, Christie (1996). "Coffee, tea, and the ultra-Protestant and Jewish nature of the boundaries of Mormonism". In Davies, Douglas (ed.). Mormon Identities in Transition. Cassell religious studies.
- Derr, Jill Mulvay (1999). ""I Have Eaten Nearly Everything Imaginable": Pioneer Diet". In Walker, Ronald W.; Dant, Doris R. (eds.). Nearly Everything Imaginable: The Everyday Life of Utah's Mormon Pioneers. Studies in Latter-day Saint History. ISBN 0842523979.
- Holzapfel, Richard Neitzel; Holzapfel, Jeni Broberg (1992). Women of Nauvoo. Salt Lake City, UT: Bookcraft.
- Namie, Joylin; Timmons, Hillary (12 December 2014). "Faith and Feeding the Family: Latter-day Saint Fathers and Foodwork". Food and Foodways. 22 (4): 247–267. doi:10.1080/07409710.2014.964588. S2CID 143578833.
- Swetnam, Susan H. (2004). "Food". In Newby, Rick (ed.). The Rocky Mountain Region: The Greenwood Encyclopedia of American Regional Cultures. Greenwood Press. ISBN 9780313328176.
