= Dinner at Eight (opera) =

Opera by William Bolcom

Dinner at Eight is an opera by William Bolcom to a libretto by Mark Campbell based on the play of the same name by George S. Kaufman. It was first performed at the Minnesota Opera on 11 March 2017 in a production staged by Tomer Zvulun. The same production received its European premiere in October of 2018 in the Wexford Festival in Ireland.
