= Twelve New Etudes for Piano =

Musical piece by William Bolcom

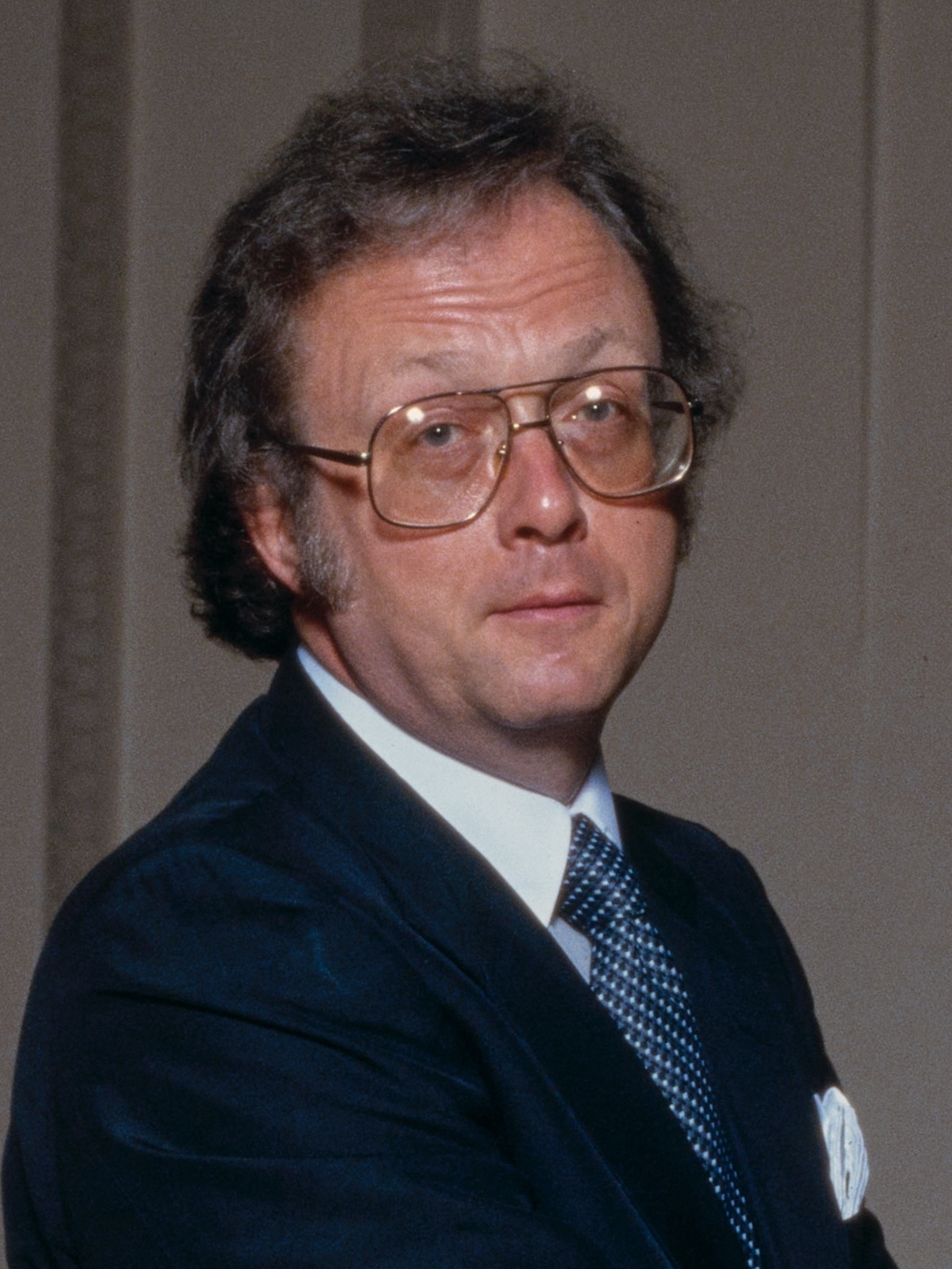
William Bolcom in 1985

Twelve New Etudes for Piano (1977–86) is a piece composed by William Bolcom, awarded the Pulitzer Prize for Music in 1988, while he was teaching composition at University of Michigan.

The set is "new" relative to Bolcom's first set of Twelve Etudes for Piano (1959–1966; released on Advance FGR-14S in 1971), and was intended for and dedicated to Paul Jacobs, who died before the composition was complete, and thus the finished set is dedicated to Jacobs, John Musto, and Marc-André Hamelin.

One of Bolcom's goals in composing the New Etudes was the fusion of tonal and what he has called "non-centered" or non-tonal elements..."a musical speech that is at once coherent and comprehensible and in constant expansion."

They are composed in a language that brings together elements of tonality and dense chromaticism.

Musto gave a partial premiere in 1986, and Hamelin premiered the complete Etudes in 1987, and recorded the pieces on New World Records in 1988 (80354).

The New Etudes are divided into four books of three pieces:

1. Book I
  1. "Fast, furious"
  2. "Récitatif"
  3. "Mirrors"
2. Book II
  1. "Scène d'opéra"
  2. "Butterflies, hummingbirds"
  3. "Nocturne"
3. Book III
  1. "Premonitions"
  2. "Rag infernal (Syncopes apocalyptiques)"
  3. "Invention"
4. Book IV
  1. "Vers le silence"
  2. "Hi-jinks"
  3. "Hyme à l'amour"
