= William Bolcom =

American composer and pianist (born 1938)

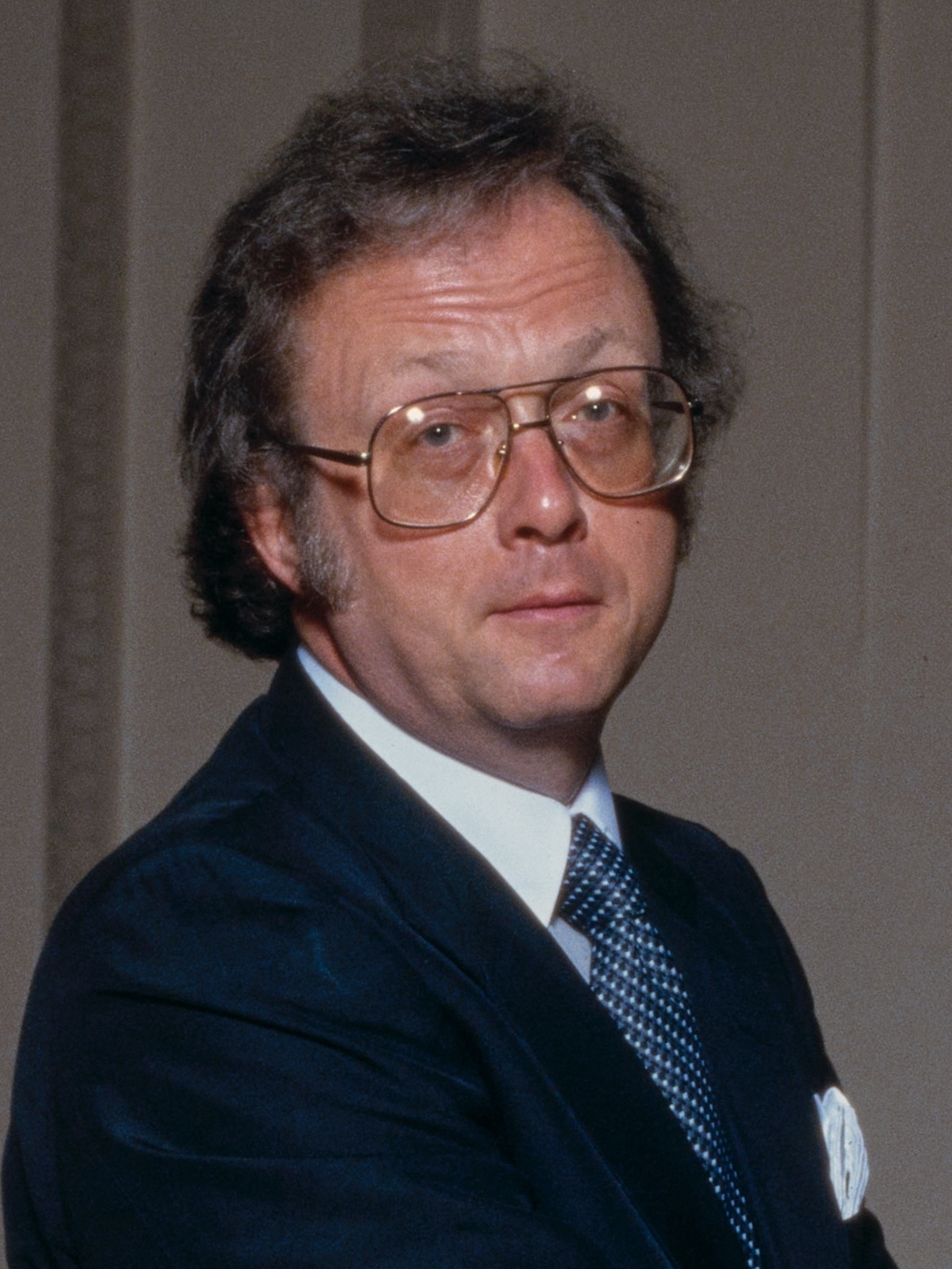
- Bolcom in 1985

Background information
- Born: May 26, 1938 (age 88)
- Origin: American
- Occupations: Composer, pianist

William Elden Bolcom (born May 26, 1938) is an American composer and pianist. He has received the Pulitzer Prize, the National Medal of Arts, a Grammy Award, and the Detroit Music Award, and was named Composer of the Year by Musical America in 2007. He taught composition at the University of Michigan from 1973 to 2008 and was named the Ross Lee Finney Distinguished University Professor of Composition in 2006. He is married to mezzo-soprano Joan Morris.

== Early life and education ==
Bolcom was born in Seattle, Washington. At age 11, he studied under faculty at University of Washington, including composition with professors George Frederick McKay and John Verrall and piano with Berthe Poncy Jacobson. He later studied with Darius Milhaud at Mills College, with Leland Smith at Stanford University, and with Olivier Messiaen at the Paris Conservatoire, where he received the 2ème Prix de Composition.

== Career ==
Bolcom was awarded Guggenheim Fellowships in 1964 and 1968. He won the Pulitzer Prize for music in 1988 for 12 New Etudes for Piano. He joined the faculty at the University of Michigan School of Music in 1973. In 1994, he was named the Ross Lee Finney Distinguished University Professor of Composition. In 2006, he was awarded the National Medal of Arts. He retired in 2008 after 35 years at the university. Notable students include Derek Bermel, Gabriela Lena Frank, David T. Little, Carter Pann, Joel Puckett, and Elena Ruehr.

As a pianist, Bolcom has performed and recorded frequently in collaboration with Joan Morris, whom he married in 1975. They have recorded more than two dozen albums of music drawn from the American Popular Songbook, beginning with the Grammy-nominated After the Ball, a collection of popular songs from around 1900. Their specialties are show tunes and parlor, cabaret, and popular songs from the late 19th and early 20th century by Henry Russell, Henry Clay Work, and others.

As a soloist, Bolcom has recorded his own compositions, as well as music by George Gershwin, Darius Milhaud, and several ragtime composers. His compositions have been highlighted in Michigan State University's Michigan Writers Series.

== Works ==
Bolcom's earliest compositions were written when he was around 11 years old; his early influences include Roy Harris and Béla Bartók. His compositions from around 1960 use a modified serial technique, under the influence of Pierre Boulez, Karlheinz Stockhausen, and Luciano Berio, whose music he particularly admired. In the 1960s he gradually began to embrace a wider variety of musical styles. His goal has been to erase boundaries between popular music and art music.

Together with Joan Morris, Bolcom composed the satirical song "Lime Jello Marshmallow Cottage Cheese Surprise" (1980).

Bolcom has written four major operas. Three of them, McTeague, A View from the Bridge, and A Wedding, were commissioned and premiered by the Lyric Opera of Chicago and conducted by Dennis Russell Davies. All three were written with librettist Arnold Weinstein, sometimes in collaboration with other writers. McTeague, based on Frank Norris's 1899 novel, premiered on October 31, 1992. A View from the Bridge, with libretto by Weinstein and Arthur Miller, premiered on October 9, 1999. A Wedding, based on Robert Altman's 1978 motion picture, with libretto by Weinstein and Altman, premiered on December 11, 2004. His fourth opera, Dinner at Eight, composed with librettist Mark Campbell and based on the George S. Kaufman and Edna Ferber play of the same name, premiered on March 11, 2017, by the commissioning organization, Minnesota Opera.

Bolcom has also composed concertos such as Lyric Concerto for Flute and Orchestra for James Galway, the Concerto in D for Violin and Orchestra for Sergiu Luca, the Concerto for Clarinet and Orchestra for Stanley Drucker, and Concert Suite for alto saxophone and band, composed for University of Michigan professor Donald Sinta in 1998. He wrote his concerto Gaea for two pianos (left hand) and orchestra for Gary Graffman and Leon Fleisher, both of whom had debilitating problems with their right hands. The Baltimore Symphony premiered it on April 11, 1996, conducted by David Zinman. The concerto is constructed so that it can be performed in three ways, with either piano part alone with reduced orchestra or with both piano parts and the two reduced orchestras combined into a full orchestra.

Bolcom's other works include nine symphonies, 12 string quartets, four violin sonatas, several piano rags (one written with William Albright), four volumes of Gospel Preludes for organ, four volumes of cabaret songs, three musical theater works (Casino Paradise, Dynamite Tonite, and Greatshot; all with Weinstein), and a one-act chamber opera, Lucrezia, with librettist Mark Campbell. The Dranoff International Two Piano Foundation commissioned Bolcom to write Recuerdos for two pianos.

=== Song cycles ===
Bolcom has written a number of song cycles. Many of these were cabarets with lyrics by Arnold Weinstein and meant to be sung by Joan Morris. These 24 cabarets were released in four volumes from the 1970s to the 1990s and finally published in one single volume. From the Diary of Sally Hemings, a song cycle for voice and piano, is a collaboration with playwright/librettist Sandra Seaton. Of Bolcom's other song cycles, the best-known is his setting of William Blake's Songs of Innocence and of Experience.

=== Songs of Innocence and of Experience ===
Bolcom's setting of William Blake's Songs of Innocence and of Experience, a three-hour work for soloists, choruses, and orchestra, was a culmination of 25 years of work.

Inspiration

At age 17, Bolcom wanted to set the complete Songs of Innocence and of Experience to music. As he comprehended the poems' diversity of artistic ideas and technical styles, he realized that he needed more musical vocabulary of different styles to do so. This realization also bolstered his idea that genres of music should not be placed in a hierarchy and that there is no distinction between "serious" and "popular" music.

Style and instrumentation

Bolcom incorporated a variety of different musical styles and genres in the music, including modern classical style using pentatonic scales, tonal classical style, bluegrass, country, soul, folk vaudeville, rock musical, and reggae. He used instruments not usually found in a traditional orchestra but used in the genres he chose: saxophones, guitar, electric guitar, bass guitar, harmonica, electric violin, and "country, rock, and folk singers".

Premiere and performances

According to Naxos Records, the 1984 premiere of the Songs at the Stuttgart Opera was followed by performances in Ann Arbor, Grant Park in Chicago, the Brooklyn Academy of Music, St. Louis, Carnegie Hall, and London's Royal Festival Hall, the latter performed by the BBC Symphony Orchestra under the direction of Leonard Slatkin.

Awards and reception

In 2004, Naxos Records produced a recording of the Songs on location at Hill Auditorium, featuring the University of Michigan School of Music, Theatre & Dance Symphony Orchestra, the student choirs from the same university, University Musical Society Choral Union, Michigan State University Children's Choir, and a variety of solo instrumentalists and singers (including Joan Morris). In 2006, it won four Grammy Awards for Best Choral Performance, Best Classical Contemporary Composition, Best Classical Album, and Best Producer of the Year, Classical.

Composer and critic Robert Carl has said that Bolcom wrote in seemingly disparate styles with "sincerity", without irony, "as equal partners", and with "love for and mastery of popular music".

== Festivals ==
VocalEssence celebrated Bolcom's music with a two-week festival in Minneapolis and St. Paul in April 2007. Nine different performances and a number of master classes were part of the festival. The spotlight performance was of Songs of Innocence and of Experience, performed in Orchestra Hall in Minneapolis by over 400 musicians under projections of Blake's accompanying artwork.

Eastern Michigan University celebrated its 16th Biennial Contemporary Music Festival by featuring Bolcom as a guest composer. The three-day festival showcased a range of his compositions as well as a discussion on "Musical Grass-Roots" led by Bolcom.

Le Piano Ouvert celebrated Bolcom's 75th birthday with a week of concerts and masterclasses in Paris in March 2014. Bolcom and Morris both performed, and were featured on France Musique in a series of live performances and interviews. The festival was directed by Guy Livingston, Anne de Fornel, and David Levi. Concerts were held at the Mona Bismarck American Center in Paris, and at the Hôtel Talleyrand on Place de la Concorde.

In April 2022, as part of the international Heidelberger Frühling Music Festival, Igor Levit and the Mahler Chamber Orchestra premiered Bolcom's second piano concerto, conducted by Elim Chan in the auditorium of the Neue Universität Heidelberg.

== Ragtime/piano discography ==
See Joan Morris page for Bolcom and Morris discography.

- Heliotrope Bouquet: Piano Rags 1900–1970, Nonesuch Records, 1971
- Bolcom Plays His Own Rags, Jazzology, 1972
- Piano Music By George Gershwin, Nonesuch Records, 1973
- Pastimes and Piano Rags, Nonesuch Records, 1974
- Ragtime Back To Back (with William Albright), U of M School of Music, 1976
- Euphonic Sounds, Omega Classics, 1988 (Reissued in 2019 as Scott Joplin: Ragtime Piano Gems)
