= Raymond, Minnesota =

City in Minnesota, United States

Raymond
- City
- Location of Raymond, Minnesota
- Coordinates: 45°01′06″N 95°14′12″W
- Country: United States
- State: Minnesota
- County: Kandiyohi

Area
  - Total: 0.88 sq mi (2.29 km^{2})
  - Land: 0.88 sq mi (2.29 km^{2})
  - Water: 0 sq mi (0.00 km^{2})
- Elevation: 1,076 ft (328 m)

Population (2020)
  - Total: 782
  - Density: 882.6/sq mi (340.78/km^{2})
- Time zone: UTC-6 (Central (CST))
  - Summer (DST): UTC-5 (CDT)
- ZIP code: 56282
- Area code: 320
- FIPS code: 27-53296
- GNIS feature ID: 2396325

Raymond is a city in southwest Kandiyohi County, Minnesota, United States. The population was 782 at the 2020 census.

Raymond High School consolidated with Clara City and Maynard High Schools in the late 1980s to create the MACCRAY (Maynard-Clara City-Raymond Independent School District).

== History ==
Raymond was platted in 1887, and named for Raymond Spicer, the son of a first settler. A post office has been in operation at Raymond since 1889.

On March 30, 2023, an early morning BNSF freight train carrying 40 cars including 14 cars hauling ethanol, derailed near downtown Raymond.

== Geography ==
According to the United States Census Bureau, the city has a total area of 0.88 square miles (2.28 km^{2}), all land.

Minnesota State Highway 23 serves as a main route in the community.

== Demographics ==
Historical population
Census	Pop.	Note	%±
1900	282		—
1910	334		18.4%
1920	416		24.6%
1930	450		8.2%
1940	487		8.2%
1950	580		19.1%
1960	608		4.8%
1970	589		−3.1%
1980	723		22.8%
1990	668		−7.6%
2000	803		20.2%
2010	764		−4.9%
2020	782		2.4%
U.S. Decennial Census

=== 2010 census ===
As of the census of 2010, there were 764 people, 307 households, and 212 families living in the city. The population density was 868.2 inhabitants per square mile (335.2/km^{2}). There were 336 housing units at an average density of 381.8 per square mile (147.4/km^{2}). The racial makeup of the city was 97.1% White, 0.4% African American, 0.1% Native American, 1.3% from other races, and 1.0% from two or more races. Hispanic or Latino of any race were 4.7% of the population.

There were 307 households, of which 36.2% had children under the age of 18 living with them, 56.7% were married couples living together, 6.8% had a female householder with no husband present, 5.5% had a male householder with no wife present, and 30.9% were non-families. 29.0% of all households were made up of individuals, and 10.1% had someone living alone who was 65 years of age or older. The average household size was 2.49 and the average family size was 3.04.

The median age in the city was 36.1 years. 29.2% of residents were under the age of 18; 6.4% were between the ages of 18 and 24; 25.1% were from 25 to 44; 25.2% were from 45 to 64; and 14% were 65 years of age or older. The gender makeup of the city was 50.0% male and 50.0% female.

=== 2000 census ===
As of the census of 2000, there were 803 people, 310 households, and 222 families living in the city. The population density was 1,316.3 inhabitants per square mile (508.2/km^{2}). There were 332 housing units at an average density of 544.2 per square mile (210.1/km^{2}). The racial makeup of the city was 95.89% White, 0.12% African American, 0.37% Native American, 2.37% from other races, and 1.25% from two or more races. Hispanic or Latino of any race were 4.36% of the population.

There were 310 households, out of which 37.4% had children under the age of 18 living with them, 57.7% were married couples living together, 10.0% had a female householder with no husband present, and 28.1% were non-families. 25.2% of all households were made up of individuals, and 14.8% had someone living alone who was 65 years of age or older. The average household size was 2.59 and the average family size was 3.08.

In the city, the population was spread out, with 30.8% under the age of 18, 6.8% from 18 to 24, 27.9% from 25 to 44, 18.8% from 45 to 64, and 15.7% who were 65 years of age or older. The median age was 34 years. For every 100 females, there were 97.8 males. For every 100 females age 18 and over, there were 92.4 males.

The median income for a household in the city was $34,083, and the median income for a family was $40,865. Males had a median income of $28,092 versus $18,676 for females. The per capita income for the city was $15,399. About 7.4% of families and 10.8% of the population were below the poverty line, including 15.3% of those under age 18 and 17.5% of those age 65 or over.

== Notable person ==
- William A. Mitchell – a food chemist who had the patent on Pop Rocks and invented Tang, Cool Whip, and Jell-O
