= Gravy Train (dog food) =

Post dog food brand

- Product type: Dog food
- Current owner: Post Consumer Brands
- Country: U.S.
- Introduced: 1959; 67 years ago
- Previous owners: General Foods; Del Monte Foods; Big Heart Pet Brands; The J.M. Smucker Company
- Website: gravytraindog.com

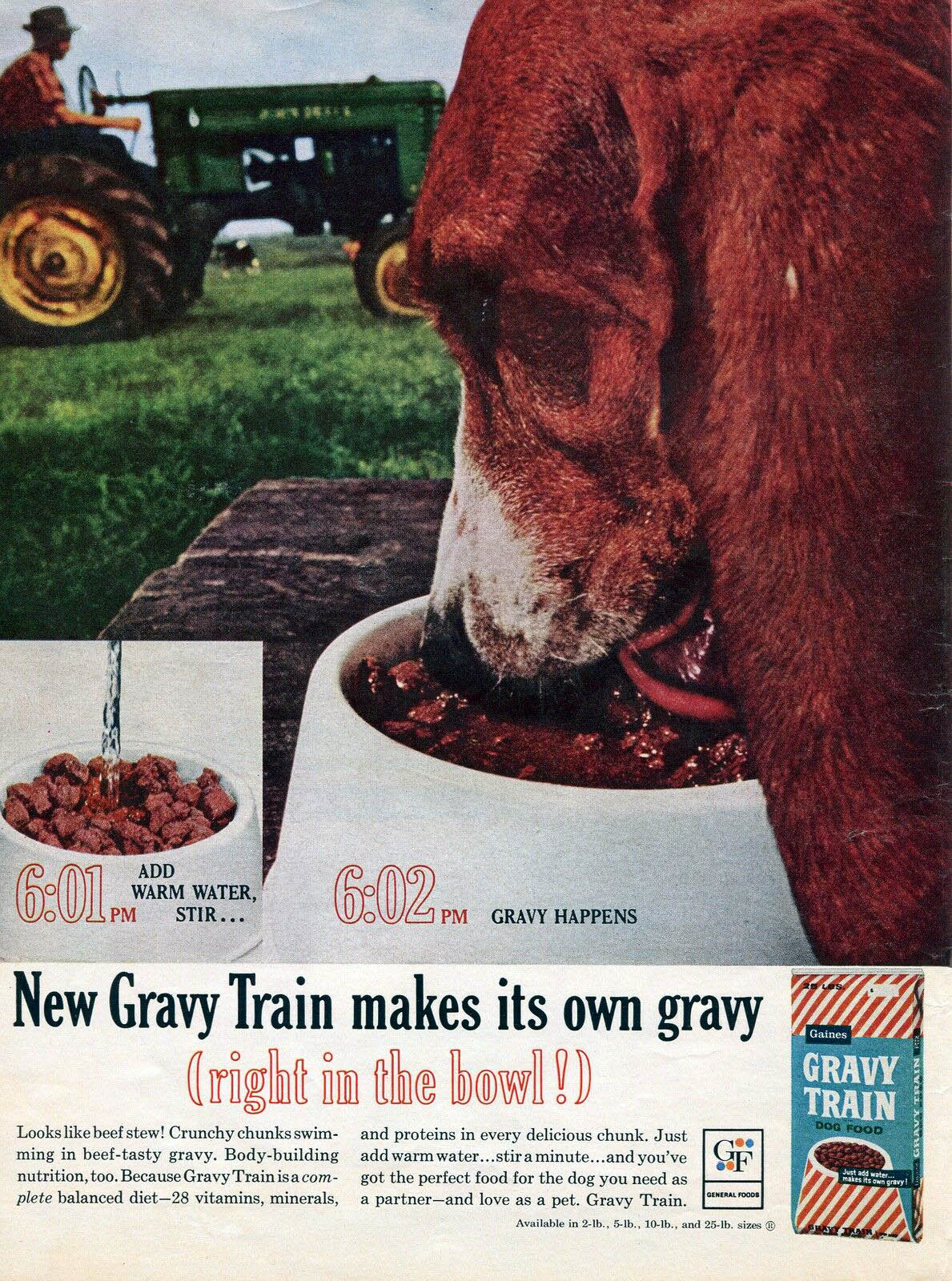
1963 ad for Gravy Train by General Foods

Gravy Train is an American dog food brand currently marketed by Post Consumer Brands. On April 28, 2023, it was one of several brands sold by The J.M. Smucker Company to Post Holdings, in a deal valued at $1.2 billion.

Originally developed by General Foods, the brand was introduced in 1959 and trademarked in 1960. It was the first brand of dog food to have a brown gravy form when warm water is added to the dry kibble, mixing with the kibble's powder coating. The gravy is intended to make the food more palatable. The advertising catchphrase was "the gravy taste dogs can't wait to finish".

== History ==
Products under the "Gravy Train" brand were originally produced and marketed by General Foods, as part of its Gaines division which included Gaines Meal, Gaines-Burgers as well as Prime Choice and Top Choice.

In 2014, Big Heart Pet Brands, the pet food division of Del Monte Foods, became an independent company, taking over rights to the Gravy Train brand. In March 2015, it was announced that J.M. Smucker had completed the acquisition of Big Heart Pet Brands and its brands portfolio. Big Heart had 2,500 employees at the moment of the purchase.

J.M. Smucker, best known for its jams, jellies, coffee, and other human foods, committed to pay $5.8 billion cash and stock deal for the acquisition. Big Heart was the largest pet food manufacturer in the U.S. by then.

In 2023, Gravy Train, along with many other pet food brands such as 9Lives, and Kibbles 'n Bits, was sold to Post Consumer Brands(The successor to General Foods)for a value of approximately 1.2 billion dollars.

== Pentobarbital detection in 2018 ==
After pentobarbital—a barbiturate used for euthanasia of dogs, cats and horses—caused the death of a dog on New Year's Eve of 2016, a wide range of pet food brands were tested by WJLA-TV of Washington, D.C., partnered with Ellipse Analytics. The brand that most consistently was found to contain pentobarbital was Gravy Train dog food.

Out of 15 cans of Gravy Train dog food that were tested, 60% tested positive for pentobarbital. The source was identified as likely to be that animals that had been euthanized with pentobarbital had been used for making the dog food. While the levels detected were not considered lethal, the drug is not legally permitted at any concentration in pet food. After declining an on-camera interview, the U.S. FDA stated that it would "investigate the matter and take appropriate enforcement action".

== Nutritional info ==
Gravy Train primarily consists of byproducts from corn, wheat and soybeans, cellulose gum (the active ingredient that creates the gravy), bone meal, vitamin and mineral supplementation, artificial colors, BHA and rosemary.
