= William A. Mitchell =

American food chemist

- Born: October 21, 1911; Raymond, Minnesota
- Died: July 26, 2004 (aged 92); Stockton, California
- Occupation: food chemist
- Known for: Invented Pop Rocks, Tang, Cool Whip and powdered egg whites

William A. Mitchell (October 21, 1911 – July 26, 2004) was an American food chemist who, while working for General Foods Corporation between 1941 and 1976, was the key inventor behind Pop Rocks, Tang, Cool Whip, and powdered egg whites. During his career he received over 70 patents.

== Early life ==
Mitchell was born in Raymond, Minnesota. When he was a teenager, he ran the sugar crystallization tanks at the American Sugar Beet Company and slept two hours a night before getting to school. He earned an undergraduate degree at Cotner College in Lincoln, Nebraska and then graduated with a master's degree in chemistry from the University of Nebraska.

== Career ==
Mitchell got a research job at an Agricultural Experiment Station in Lincoln, Nebraska. A lab accident there left him with second- and third-degree burns over most of his body. He joined General Foods in 1941. His first major success came with a tapioca substitute he helped develop during World War II, in response to the disruption of cassava supplies. Because of this, tapioca quickly became known as "Mitchell mud" within the US WW II infantry.

In 1957, he invented a powdered fruit-flavored vitamin-enhanced drink mix that became known as Tang Flavor Crystals. NASA started using Tang in 1962 in their space program.

In 1956, he tried to create instantly self-carbonating soda, which resulted in the creation of Pop Rocks. Although Pop Rocks weren't sold until 1975, he received a patent for its manufacturing process in 1961.

In 1967, he introduced Cool Whip, a whipped topping similar to whipped cream, which became the largest and most profitable line in its division very quickly.

He held more than 70 patents. Mitchell was a resident of Lincoln Park, New Jersey for many years before moving out west after his retirement in 1976.

== Personal life ==
He was married to Ruth Cobbey Mitchell and they had seven children. His daughter, Cheryl Mitchell, also became a food scientist. He moved to Stockton after Ruth's death in 1999. Mitchell died of heart failure on July 26, 2004, at the age of 92 in Stockton, California, where he was living with his daughter.
