= Henriette Louise de Waldner de Freundstein =

French aristocrat and writer

- Baroness of Oberkirch
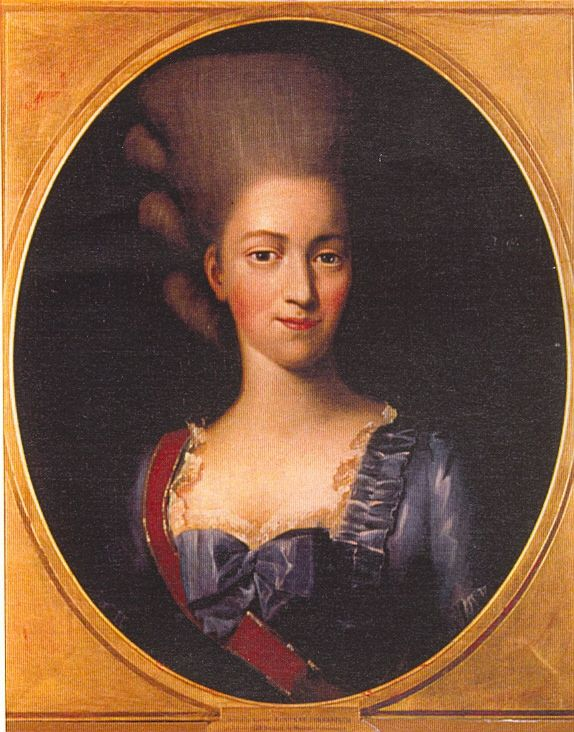
- Born: Henriette Louise de Waldner de Freundstein; 5 January 1754; Schweighouse-Thann, Alsace; France
- Died: 10 June 1803 (aged 49); Strasbourg, Austria-Hungary (now Austria)
- Spouse: Baron Charles Frédéric Siegfried d'Oberkirch
- Issue: Marie-Philippine Frédérique Dorothée d'Oberkirch
- Father: Francois Louis Waldner de Freundstein, Comte de Waldner
- Mother: Wilhelmine Auguste Berckheim de Ribeauvillé
- Occupation: Writer

Henriette Louise de Waldner de Freundstein, Baronne d'Oberkirch (5 June 1754 – 10 June 1803) was a French aristocrat, socialite, and memoirist.

== Biography ==
She was born on 5 June 1754 in Schweighouse-Thann, Alsace to François Louis Waldner de Freundstein, Baron de Waldner and Wilhelmine Auguste Berckheim de Ribeauvillé. After her birth, her father became the Comte de Waldner.

She married Baron Charles Frédéric Siegfried d'Oberkirch. They had a daughter, Marie-Philippine Frédérique Dorothée (1777–1827), who married in 1798 to Count Louis Simon de Bernard de Montbrison. Their grandson edited and published the Mémoires in English in 1852 and in French in 1854.

The baroness lived in and wrote about court society in her native Alsace, in Montbéliard, Stuttgart and (most importantly) in Paris and Versailles; her trips to the court of Louis XVI occurred in 1782, 1784, and 1786. She was a childhood friend of the Grand Duchess Maria Feodorovna (Sophie Dorothea of Württemberg), later the Empress of Russia, and of Goethe. The writer Jakob Michael Reinhold Lenz fell in love with her in 1776 and wrote several works inspired by this love. Her writing provided insight into high society during the end of the ancien régime.

The baroness notably praised the whipped cream served at a lunch at the Hameau de Chantilly, which would later be named Crème Chantilly.
