= Cream filling =

Cream filling may refer to:

- Custard
- Whipped cream
