= Crazy Dips =

Spanish candy brand

Crazy Dips is a brand of candy produced by Chupa Chups in Spain. They come with a 16 g packet filled with popping candy and a lollipop for dipping. This lollipop is often shaped like a foot and is dipped in a pouch of Pop Rocks. Crazy Dips comes in two flavours: Strawberry and Cola, though the Strawberry is by far the most common variant.

This product was developed by a Korean company named Jeongwoo Confectionery. Jeongwoo was a producer of popping candy (pop rocks) for Asian markets since 1985. When the company produced popping candy, they used a certain sizes of popping candy. The acceptable particles size for the popping candy was from 0.5 mm to 5.16 mm. But these quality standards were made a headache to the company because there were always some powders which were out of the standard size ranges.

A general manager of Jeongwoo tried to find a solution to use the remaining powders. One day, he got an idea that he used a lollipop dipping the powder. Jeongwoo developed new concept of candy in the market which was a dipping candy. This company introduced the new product to Chupa Chups. Chupa Chups decided testing this product in US market, year 1988, under the brand name, 'Crazy Dips'.
