= 9Lives =

Brand of cat food

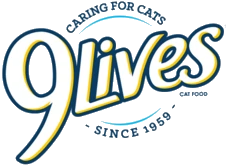
- Product type: Cat food
- Current owner: Post Consumer Brands
- Country: United States
- Introduced: 1959; 67 years ago
- Previous owners: StarKist; Big Heart Pet Brands; J.M. Smucker
- Website: 9lives.com

9Lives is a brand of cat food launched in 1959. Better known today by its mascot, Morris, it has four varieties of dry food (Daily Essentials, Plus Care, Indoor Complete and Long Life Formula), and five lines of wet food in various flavors.

On April 28, 2023, Post Holdings completed the acquisition of multiple pet food brands from The J.M. Smucker Company for 1.2 billion dollars. 9Lives was one of the brands involved in the deal and is now marketed by Post Consumer Brands.

== Overview ==
Introduced to the market by tuna processor StarKist Foods in 1959, the brand also promotes adoption of cats from animal shelters. In 2006, 9Lives kicked off the inaugural tour of Morris' Million Cat Rescue, a nationwide bus tour to encourage local cat adoption.

9Lives has recently added a new cat to its advertising, Li'l Mo, an orange kitten who has been adopted from a Los Angeles animal shelter putatively by Morris himself.

== History ==
9Lives was StarKist's flagship pet food brand. In 1963, Heinz acquired StarKist, and by 1969, the first Morris TV commercials aired. Heinz sold StarKist and 9Lives to Del Monte in 2002. Del Monte spun off the pet foods division as Big Heart in 2014. Big Heart Pet Brands was later acquired by The J.M. Smucker Company in 2015.

For a period of time in the late 1970s and early 1980s, 9Lives used Sylvester the Cat from Warner Bros.' Looney Tunes and Merrie Melodies cartoons on the packages and in advertising as the mascot for its newly introduced dry cat food. The animated television commercials were directed by Dwayne Crowther and produced by Darr Hawthorne at Duck Soup Productions, and animated by Corny Cole, Bob Carlson, Craig Clark, Amby Paliwoda, Toby Bluth, Jeff Howard, and Mark Kausler, and usually consisted of Sylvester trying to get to his box of 9Lives, while avoiding Marc Antony. Sylvester would always succeed in luring the dog away so he could get his food, but he would find himself a target again by the end of the commercial, when Sylvester would always proclaim 9Lives dry food as "worth riskin' your life for!" Sylvester never appeared in commercials for 9Lives canned cat food and by 1986, he would be replaced by Morris for the dry food packaging and advertising.

In February 2023, 9lives, along with many other pet food brands, such as Gravy Train and Kibbles 'n Bits, was sold to Post Consumer Brands for approximately 1.2 billion dollars.
