= Tang (drink mix) =

American drink mix brand

- Product type: Artificially flavored drink mix
- Current owner: Mondelēz International (except North America); Kraft Heinz (North America)
- Country: U.S.
- Introduced: 1957; 69 years ago
- Markets: Worldwide
- Previous owners: General Foods; Kraft Foods Inc.
- Website: www.mondelezinternational.com/our-brands/tang/

Tang is an American drink mix brand that was formulated by General Foods Corporation food scientist William A. Mitchell and chemist William Bruce James in 1957, and first marketed in powdered form in 1959. The Tang brand is owned in most countries by Mondelēz International, a North American company spun off from Kraft Foods in 2012. Kraft Heinz owns the Tang brand in North America.

Sales of Tang were poor until NASA used it on John Glenn's Mercury flight in February 1962. Since then it has been closely associated with the U.S. human spaceflight program, which created the misconception that Tang was invented for the space program. Tang continues to be used on NASA missions in the present day, over 50 years after its introduction.

== History ==
General Foods Corporation food scientist William A. Mitchell and chemist William Bruce James formulated and trademarked orange Tang in 1957. Tang entered test markets in 1958 and was available to the public beginning in 1959.

Tang was used by early NASA crewed space flights. In 1962, when Mercury astronaut John Glenn conducted eating experiments in orbit, Tang was selected for the menu; it was also used during some Gemini flights, and has also been carried aboard numerous Space Shuttle missions. Although many soda companies sent specially designed canned drinks into space with the crew of STS-51-F, the crew preferred to use Tang, as it could be mixed into existing water containers easily. In 2013, former NASA astronaut Buzz Aldrin said "Tang sucks". In his autobiography, Return to Earth, published forty years earlier, Aldrin had further clarified: "I can't speak for the other flights, but before ours [Apollo 11], the three of us dutifully sampled the orange drink, supposedly Tang, and instead chose a grapefruit-orange mixture as our citrus drink. If Tang was on our flight I was unaware of it."

The creator of Tang, William A. Mitchell, also invented Pop Rocks, Cool Whip, a form of instant-set Jell-O, and other convenience foods. Chemist William Bruce James also invented several Jell-O flavors.

Orange Tang was packaged in glass jars with a metallic green label and orange metal lid. It was promoted as an "instant breakfast" drink rather than a soft drink mix, because it was fortified with vitamins C and A. In print and television advertising Tang was referred to as the nutritious "space age" drink of the astronauts.

Tang's advertising in the 1990s and early 2000s featured an orangutan as a mascot.

== Nutritional facts ==
Tang is sold in powdered and liquid-concentrate form. The suggested serving size is 2 tablespoons, or 31 grams of powdered Original Orange flavored Tang per 8 US fluid ounces (240 ml) of water. A single suggested serving of Tang contains 29 grams (1.0 oz) of sugar (representing 94% of the product's dry weight); 10% RDA of carbohydrates; 100% RDA of vitamin E; 100% RDA of vitamin C; 6% RDA of calcium and has a total of 120 calories (500 kJ).

== Other versions ==
In 1961, General Foods introduced grapefruit flavored Tang and advertised it in Time Life magazine. It was referred to as a new, natural-tasting Tang flavor. Packaging was a glass jar with yellow label and green metal lid. In 1971 the packaging was updated with an orange metallic label.

In 1971, General Foods introduced a grape flavor of Tang and advertised it in the New York Times Weekly Magazine July 18, 1971. It appeared on store shelves, first with a metallic blue label and blue metal lid, subsequently with a metallic purple label and purple metal lid. While orange Tang could be purchased in various sizes including a large net weight 27 oz. glass jar, the grape flavor was only available in an 18 oz. size.

In 2007, Kraft introduced a new version of orange Tang which replaced half of the sugar with artificial sweeteners. The new packaging advertises "1/2 the sugar of 100% juice". The artificial sweeteners used in the new formulation are sucralose, acesulfame potassium and neotame. The new formula is more concentrated and distributed in smaller containers, with a 12.3 US fl oz (360 ml) (348 g (12.3 oz)) making 8 US quarts (7,600 ml).

According to the preparation instructions on the 20 fl oz (590 ml) Tang orange drink mix, 2 level tablespoons of Tang can be combined with 1 cup or 8 fl oz (240 ml) of cold water for 1 serving.

In 2009, another version of Tang emerged in 20 US fl oz (590 ml) containers making only 6 US quarts (5,700 ml).

Orange-flavored Tang contributes to most current sales worldwide; however, there are a wide range of flavors of Tang offered globally, including grape, lemon, mango, and pineapple.

== Sales ==
Tang is sold in more than 30 countries and is available in a variety of flavors depending on location. The top three markets for Tang around the world are Brazil, Argentina, and the Philippines.

In the Middle East, more than half of Tang's annual sales occur in just six weeks around Ramadan.

In June 2011, Kraft Foods announced that Tang has become its twelfth billion-dollar brand, with global sales nearly doubling since 2006. The brand in 2010 controlled a category-best 15.6% of the international powder concentrate market although, like other highly processed or sweetened beverages, demand in developed economies has stagnated or fallen in line with consumers increasing preference for lower calorie drinks. In 2018, Tang's manufacturer Mondelez reported a drop in sales following the introduction of tax on calorific sweetened beverages in the Philippines.

== See also ==
- Instant breakfast
- Kool-Aid
