= Maxwell House International =

American coffee brand

- Type: Instant beverage
- Other name: General Foods International Coffee
- Origin: United States
- Introduced: 1970s

Maxwell House International is a brand of flavored instant coffee beverages produced by the Maxwell House coffee division of the Kraft Foods corporation, based in the United States.

== History ==
The product line was introduced in the early 1970s as General Foods International Coffee, a brand owned by General Foods. The first three flavors at launch were Café au lait (later renamed to Cafe Francais), Suisse Mocha, and Cafe Vienna. The line, sold in small tins, was marketed as a premium product, and remained a strong seller through the 1990s.

"General Foods International Coffees" underwent a name change in late 2005 to simply "General Foods International" in order to accommodate recent additions of non-coffee-based beverages (Chai latte and Vanilla Creme). In 2009, it began to carry a "From the makers of Maxwell House" secondary label. During the summer of 2010, this product line was rebranded as Maxwell House International Cafés.
