= Milk-Bone =

Brand of dog biscuit

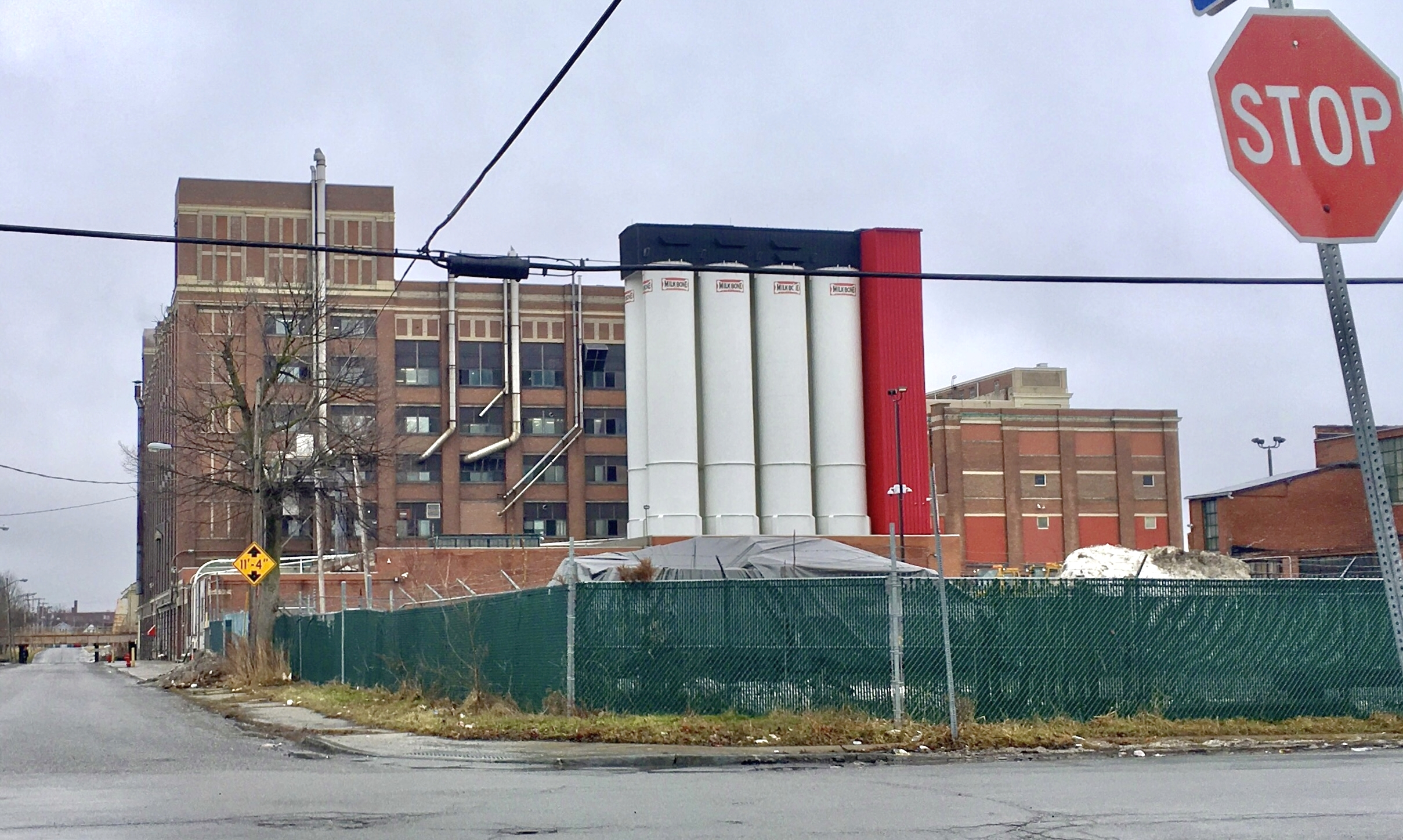
- Milk-Bone factory in Buffalo, New York
- Product type: Dog biscuit
- Current owner: J.M. Smucker (2015)
- Country: U.S.
- Introduced: 1908; 118 years ago
- Previous owners: F.H. Bennett Biscuit Company (1908); National Biscuit Company (1931); NABISCO (~1971); NABISCO Brands (1981); Kraft Foods (1985); Del Monte Foods (2006); Big Heart Pet Brands (2014)
- Website: milkbone.com

Milk-Bone is an American brand of dog biscuit. It was established in 1908 by the F.H. Bennett Biscuit Company, which operated a bakery located in the Lower East Side of New York City. The biscuit was originally named "Maltoid" and was a bone-shaped treat formulated with meat, cereals, milk, and liver oil. The biscuits sold in the USA are made in Buffalo, New York.

The company is part of the Del Monte Foods Co. group.

== History ==
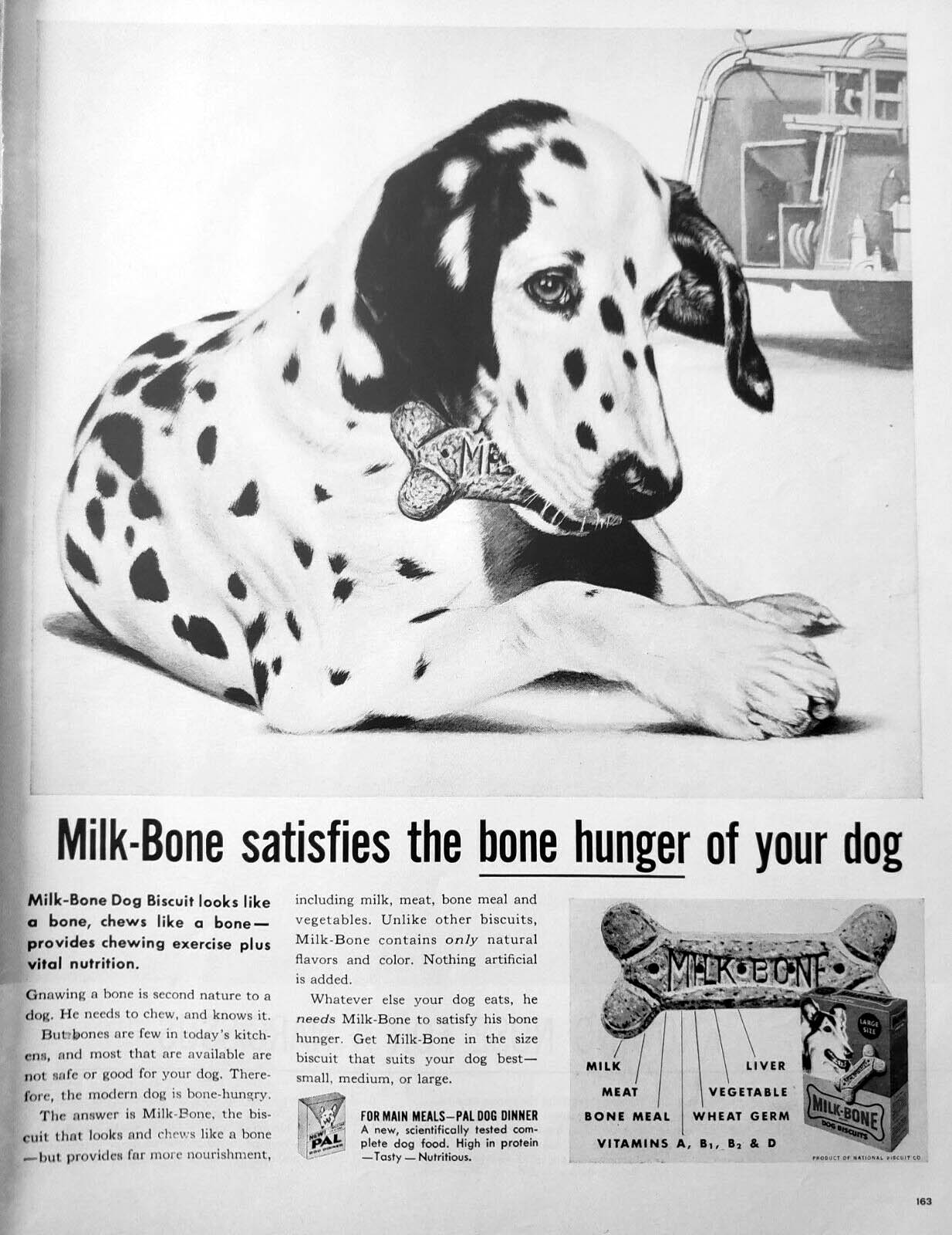
1959 Milk-Bone ad

Sometime between 1915 and 1926, the biscuit was simply named "Milk-Bone", owing to the high composition of cow's milk. In 1931, the bakery was acquired by the National Biscuit Company (now Nabisco). The biscuit was the only Bennett product carried over after the acquisition.

Over the next few decades, the Milk-Bone was expanded to include a number of different flavors, such as chicken and beef. The marketing focus was also shifted from Milk-Bone being merely a dog treat to a product that promoted cleaner teeth and better breath. Nabisco, under the ownership of Kraft Foods, sold the Milk-Bone rights to Del Monte Foods in May 2006.

In 2014, Del Monte Foods sold their Consumer Brands division to Del Monte Pacific Limited and focused exclusively on pet products, legally becoming Big Heart Pet Brands.

On February 3, 2015, The J.M. Smucker Company announced the acquisition of Big Heart Pet Brands.

A box of Milk-Bone treats makes an early product placement appearance in the 1924 silent film The Tomboy, and this product was the basis for a line from the TV sitcom Cheers, spoken by George Wendt's character Norm: "It's a dog-eat-dog world and I'm wearing Milk-Bone underwear."

A box of Milk-Bone Biscuits can be seen, in cartoon form, in Mickey's Surprise Party (1939), a theatrical advertisement/cartoon short produced by Walt Disney Productions for Nabisco. Pluto is seen presenting Minnie's dog Fifi with a box of Milk-Bone Biscuits; she happily accepts them and thanks Pluto by kissing him.
