= Mickey's Surprise Party =

1939 Mickey Mouse cartoon film

- Title card
- Directed by: Hamilton Luske
- Produced by: Walt Disney
- Starring: Walt Disney; Leone LeDoux; Clarence Nash; Pinto Colvig
- Music by: Oliver Wallace
- Animation by: Ollie Johnston; Walt Kelly; Riley Thomson; Charles A. Nichols; Harvey Toombs; Ken Peterson; Claude Smith; Lynn Karp
- Color process: Technicolor
- Production company: Walt Disney Productions
- Distributed by: National Biscuit Company
- Release date: February 18, 1939
- Running time: 5:15
- Country: United States
- Language: English

Mickey's Surprise Party is a 1939 American animated short film directed by Hamilton Luske, produced by Walt Disney Productions and distributed by National Biscuit Company. It was the 105th short in the Mickey Mouse film series to be released, and the second for that year. Mickey's Surprise Party is the second cartoon with Mickey and Minnie Mouse in their current designs, created by animator Fred Moore. Moore's designs for both characters had previously appeared in The Standard Parade for 1939 earlier that year.

This is notable for being the first Disney product of any kind to be sponsored by a company. Commonly thought to be in the public domain, its copyright was renewed on May 2, 1966. Walt Disney hated the idea of public commercials, and avoided commercial entanglements until then. The cartoon had its premiere at the Golden Gate International Exposition (GGIE) on Treasure Island in San Francisco in February 1939. The film was shown in the "Food and Beverages" building in the Nabisco Theater. Walt was present at the fair for the premiere of the short. It was also shown in the Nabisco Theater at the New York World's Fair in 1939, which did not open until April. The two versions were identical except that the National Biscuit Company products (cookies and crackers) featured at the end were different, reflecting products available on the west and east coasts.

In the short, Pluto's romantic partner is Fifi, a Pekingese who also appears in Puppy Love (1933), Pluto's Quin-puplets (1937) and Society Dog Show (1939).

== Plot ==
One day, Minnie bakes cookies for Mickey's birthday, but her dog, Fifi, accidentally knocks popcorn into her batter while chasing a fly. Minnie, none the wiser, puts the batter in the oven. Minnie then prepares for the visit, as does Fifi. Mickey and Pluto then arrive. Minnie accepts Mickey's flowers while playing the grand piano, but Fifi rejects Pluto's bone. Minnie has baked the cookies too long, burning them. Mickey smells the smoke and Minnie, suddenly remembering her cookies, runs into the kitchen. As she takes them out, the popcorn starts popping, but not before Pluto eats one, leading to him having an exploding cookie stuck in his belly while Mickey fights the burnt cookies with a water sprayer (with water filled from Minnie's goldfish bowl).

While Minnie is on the couch crying, Mickey tries to comfort her, saying "My mother used to burn them all the time!" However, it does little to make her feel better. To help Minnie, Mickey immediately gets an idea and he and Pluto rush to the market, where they hastily return with their surprise package. Minnie no sooner turns around and sees that Mickey and Pluto have brought back with them a range of several National Biscuit Company products, including Oreos, Lorna Doone, Ritz Crackers, Barnum's Animal Crackers, Social Tea Biscuits, Fig Newtons (Mickey's and Minnie's favorite), and Milk Bones (which Fifi accepts and kisses Pluto). Minnie then kisses Mickey all over his face.

== Voice cast ==
- Walt Disney as Mickey Mouse
- Leone LeDoux as Minnie Mouse
- Clarence Nash as Pluto
- Pinto Colvig as Fifi the Peke

== Home media ==
The short was released on December 4, 2001, on Walt Disney Treasures: Mickey Mouse in Living Color.

The short was also included in the US VHS and LaserDisc release The Spirit of Mickey and the non-US VHS and LaserDisc release Minnie's Greatest Hits, with all the National Biscuit Company packaging replaced by generic products, and all of Minnie's lines referencing the names of the products were overdubbed by Russi Taylor. However, most DVD versions of the short contain the original uncut version, replete with the National Biscuit Company references. Milk Bone Dog Biscuits, referenced in the original version of the film were made by the National Biscuit Company at the time of the short's production.

== See also ==
- Mickey Mouse (film series)
