= Reddi-Wip =

Whipped cream brand

- Product type: Whipped cream
- Current owner: Conagra Brands
- Country: United States
- Introduced: 1948; 78 years ago
- Website: www.reddiwip.com

Reddi-Wip is an American brand of sweetened whipped cream propelled from its container by nitrous oxide. It is produced by Conagra Brands and is sold in varieties such as Original, Extra Creamy, Fat Free, Zero Sugar, and Barista. In 2019, two new plant-based varieties, Non-Dairy Coconut and Non-Dairy Almond, were released. Both products are dairy-free and plant-based.

Reddi-Wip was packaged in Chicago, Illinois, by Hunt-Wesson Foods and Beatrice Foods at Brookhill Farms Dairy until 1982, when operations were moved to Holland, Michigan, and later sold to Conagra Brands. In 2007, Conagra relocated the production of Reddi-Wip to its Indianapolis, Indiana facility.

Reddi-Wip remains one of Conagra Brands' major brands and is the second most eaten brand of whipped topping in the United States behind Cool Whip.

== History ==
During the food rationing era of World War II, Aaron S. "Bunny" Lapin invented Sta-Whip as a cream substitute using vegetable oil.

In 1948, he invented Reddi-Wip in collaboration with Aaron Block, using real cream. They developed a new valve more suitable for dispensing whipped cream, with fluting to create a pattern and a tilt-to-open design that preserves the propellant. Other similar products were on the market at the time, including the non-dairy Rich's Whip Topping and Delsoy Presto Whip, which were developed at Henry Ford's soybean laboratories. Delsoy Presto Whip was packed in pressurized cans that had been developed for military insecticide sprays during the war.

Lapin applied and received a patent for "dispensing valves for gas pressure containers". He achieved national distribution in 1954, selling his company in 1963. In 1968, Hunt-Wesson acquired Reddi-Wip from Marcus Lipsky, Lapin's brother-in-law. Lipsky was an associate of Chicago mobster Ross Prio.

In 1983, then Reddi-Wip brand owner Hunt-Wesson Foods briefly experimented with amaretto and butterscotch flavors.

Norton-Simon merged with Beatrice Foods in 1985 and was subsequently acquired in 1990 by Conagra, Norton-Simon's corporate heir.
