= Dream Whip =

Powdered base for a whipped dessert topping

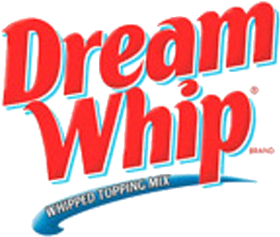
- Product type: Whipped topping mix
- Current owner: Kraft Heinz
- Produced by: Kraft Foods
- Country: U.S.
- Introduced: 1956; 70 years ago
- Previous owners: General Foods; Kraft Foods Inc.
- Website: kraftheinz.com/dreamwhip

Dream Whip is a brand of whipped topping mix that is mixed with milk and vanilla to make a whipped dessert topping, currently owned by the Kraft Heinz company.

Dream Whip was developed and released by the General Foods Corporation in 1956 as one of its convenience products marketed at that time.

General Foods would be eventually bought by Philip Morris USA in 1985, and ended up generally being absorbed by Kraft Foods Inc.

== See also ==
- Cool Whip
- Whipped cream
- List of dessert sauces
