= Big Heart Pet Brands =

American company

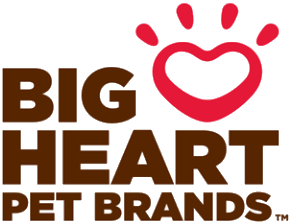

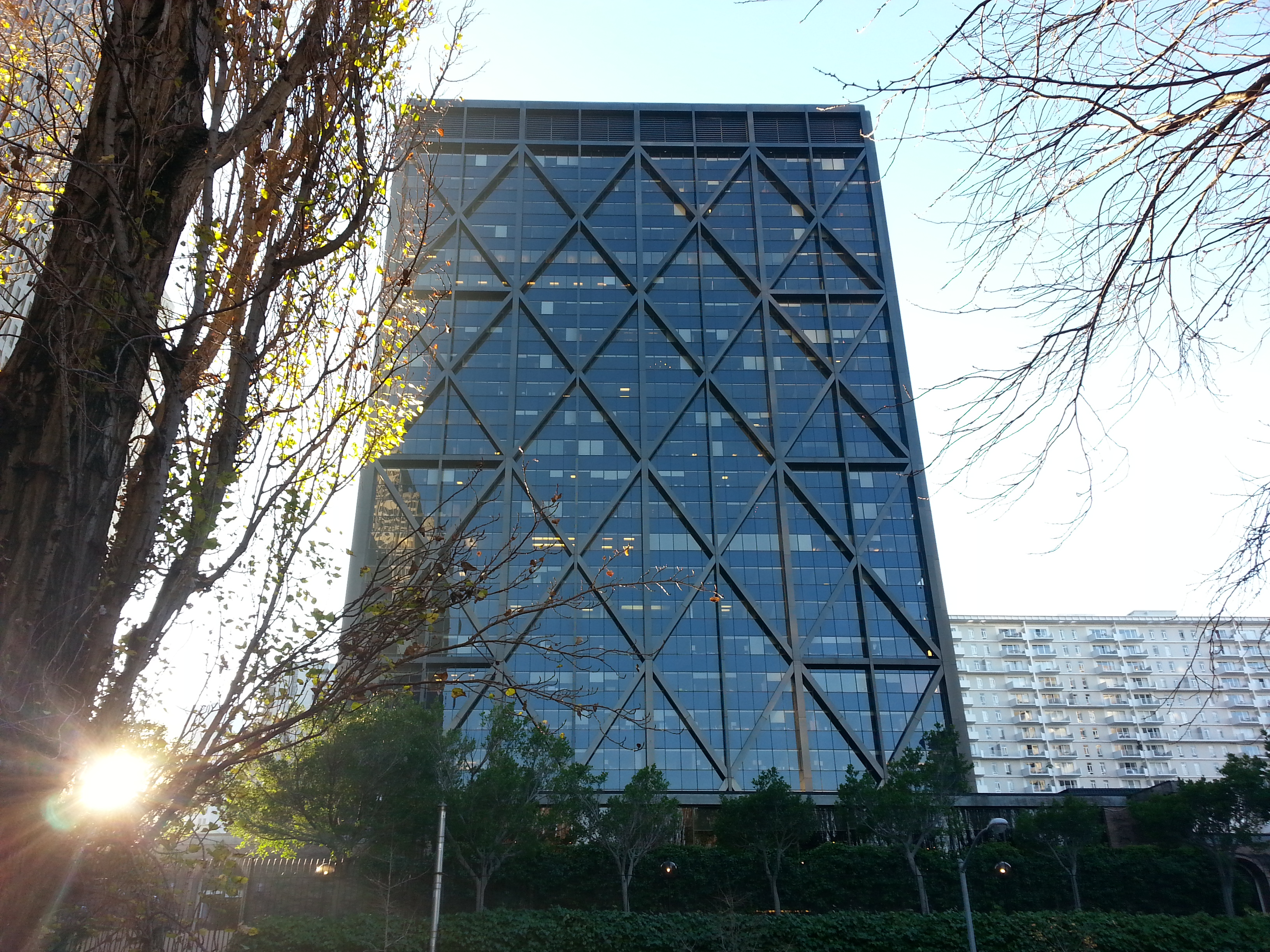
- One Maritime Plaza, headquarters
- Type: Subsidiary
- Industry: Food
- Predecessor: Del Monte Foods
- Founded: January 28, 2014; 12 years ago
- Defunct: 2015; 11 years ago
- Fate: Acquired by The J.M. Smucker Co. in 2015, which took over its brands
- Successor: J.M. Smucker Company
- Headquarters: One Maritime Plaza; San Francisco, U.S.
- Area served: Americas
- Key people: David J. West (CEO)
- Products: Pet food, pet snacks
- Brands: Gravy Train; Meow Mix; Milk-Bone; Milo's Kitchen; Kibbles 'n Bits; 9Lives; Natural Balance
- Parent: The J.M. Smucker Company

Big Heart Pet Brands was a short-lived American company that manufactured, distributed and marketed branded pet food and other products for the U.S. retail market. Formerly a subsidiary of J.M. Smucker Co., it was headquartered at the One Maritime Plaza in San Francisco.

Big Heart Pet Brands was previously the pet food division of Del Monte Foods prior to their 2014 sale to Del Monte Pacific Limited.

They generated approximately $2.0 billion in net sales in fiscal 2013. Their brands included Meow Mix, Kibbles 'n Bits, Milk-Bone, 9Lives, Gravy Train, Nature's Recipe, Canine Carry Outs, Pup-Peroni, and Milo's Kitchen, among others. Big Heart Pet Brands also produced and distributed private label pet products.

On February 3, 2015, it was announced The J.M. Smucker Company would acquire Big Heart Pet Brands for $5.8 billion. J.M. Smucker took over the former Big Heart's brands, marketing under its name.

== Pentobarbital detection in Gravy Train dog food in 2018 ==
After pentobarbital—a barbiturate used for euthanasia of dogs, cats and horses—caused the death of a dog on New Year's Eve of 2016, a wide range of pet food brands were tested by WJLA-TV of Washington, D.C., partnered with Ellipse Analytics. The brand that most consistently was found to contain pentobarbital was Big Heart Pet Brands' Gravy Train dog food.

Out of 15 cans of the company's Gravy Train dog food that were tested, 60% tested positive for pentobarbital. The source was identified as likely to be that animals that had been euthanized with pentobarbital had been used for making the dog food. While the levels detected were not considered lethal, the drug is not legally permitted at any concentration in pet food. After declining an on-camera interview, the FDA stated that it would "investigate the matter and take appropriate enforcement action".
