= Mousse =

Soft creamy prepared food using air bubbles for texture

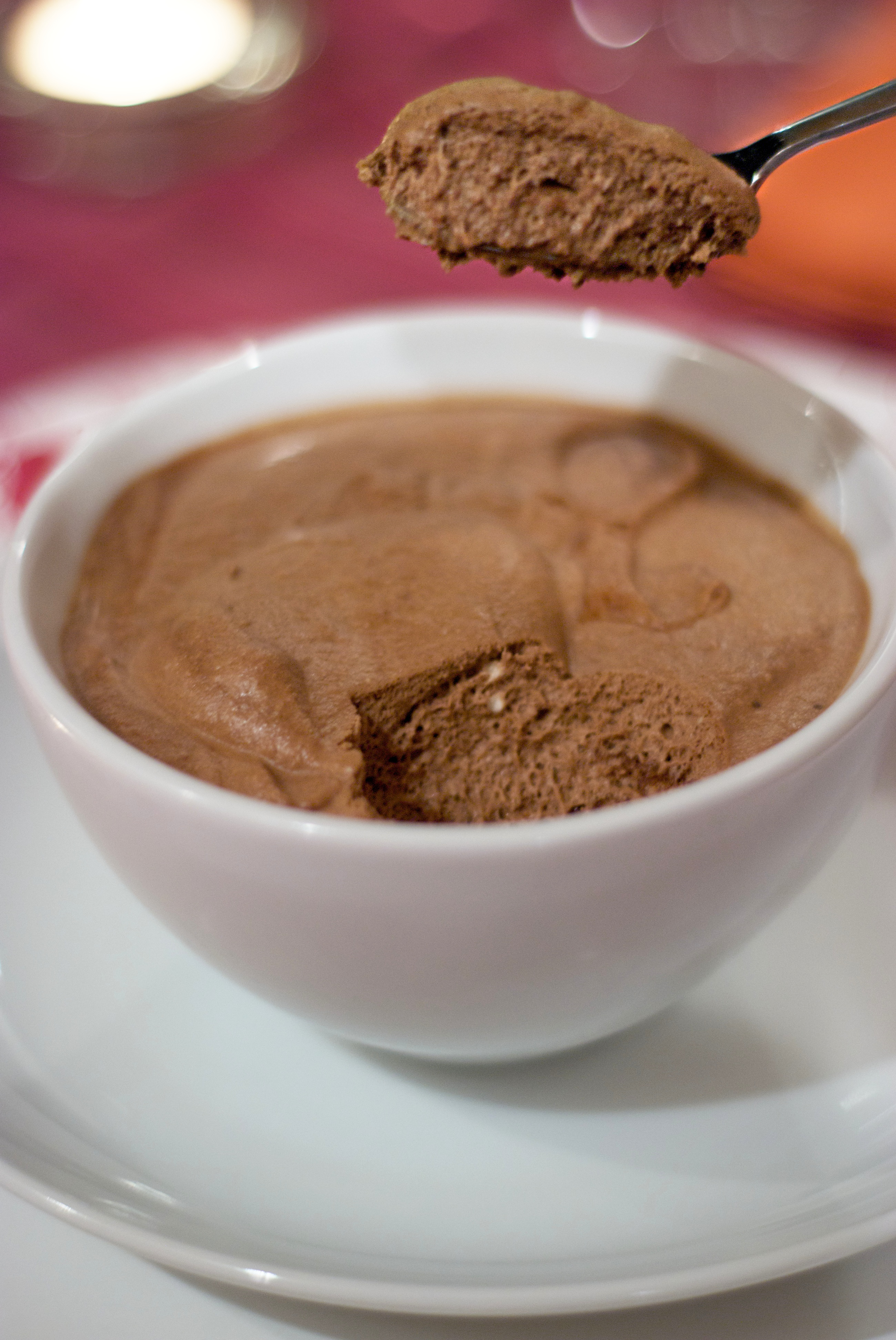
- Chocolate coffee mousse
- Course: Dessert
- Place of origin: France
- Main ingredients: Whipped egg whites or whipped cream, chocolate or puréed fruit
- Variations: Chocolate, vanilla, strawberry, choco vanilla, etc.

A mousse (/ˈmuːs/, French: [mus]; lit. 'foam') is a soft, prepared food that incorporates air bubbles to give it a light and airy texture. It can range from light and fluffy to creamy and thick. A mousse may be sweet or savory.

== History ==
Various desserts consisting of whipped cream in pyramidal shapes with coffee, liqueurs, chocolate, fruits, and so on either in the mixture or poured on top were called crème en mousse ('cream in a foam'), crème mousseuse ('foamy cream'), mousse ('foam'), and so on, as early as 1768. Modern mousses are a continuation of this tradition.

== Types ==
=== Sweet ===
Sweet mousses are typically made with whipped egg whites, whipped cream, or both, and flavored with one or more of chocolate, coffee, caramel, puréed fruits, or various herbs and spices, such as mint or vanilla. In the case of some chocolate mousses, egg yolks are often stirred into melted chocolate to give the final product a richer mouthfeel. Mousses are also typically chilled before being served, which gives them a denser texture. Additionally, mousses are often frozen into silicone molds and unmolded to give the mousse a defined shape. Sweetened mousse is served as a dessert or used as an airy cake filling. It is sometimes stabilized with gelatin. When making a new flavor of mousse, an important rule is the body is formed of whipping cream and either separated egg yolks or whites (almost never both in the same dish), and frequently, gelatin.

=== Savory ===
Savory mousses can be made from meat, fish, shellfish, foie gras, cheese, or vegetables. Hot mousses often receive their light texture from the addition of beaten egg whites.

Molded and shaped fish mousse with bread and butter remains a popular meal of American cuisine, if not a party dip, although it is not as common as it was in the 1950s.

== Gallery ==
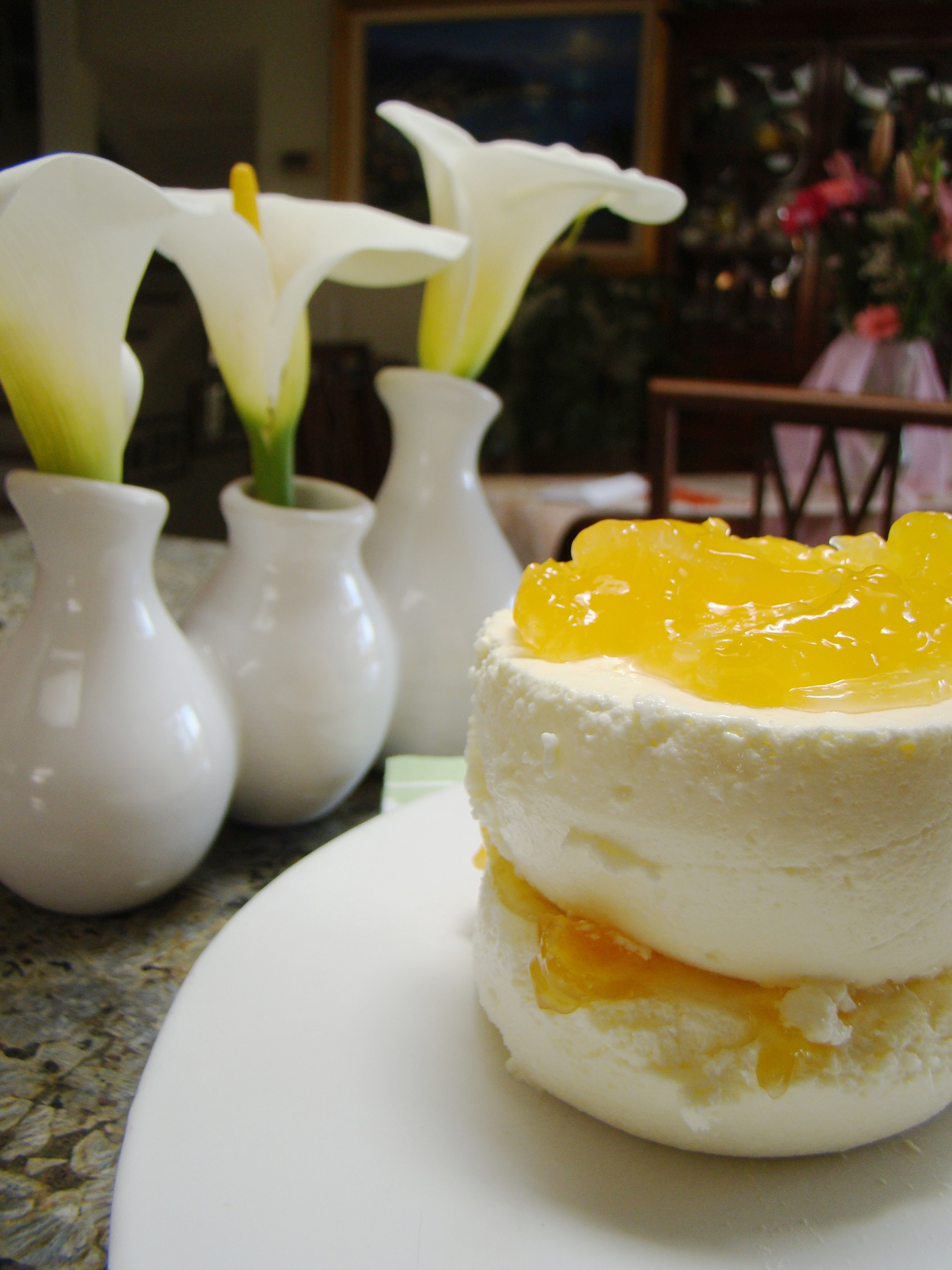
Lemon mousse with peach compote

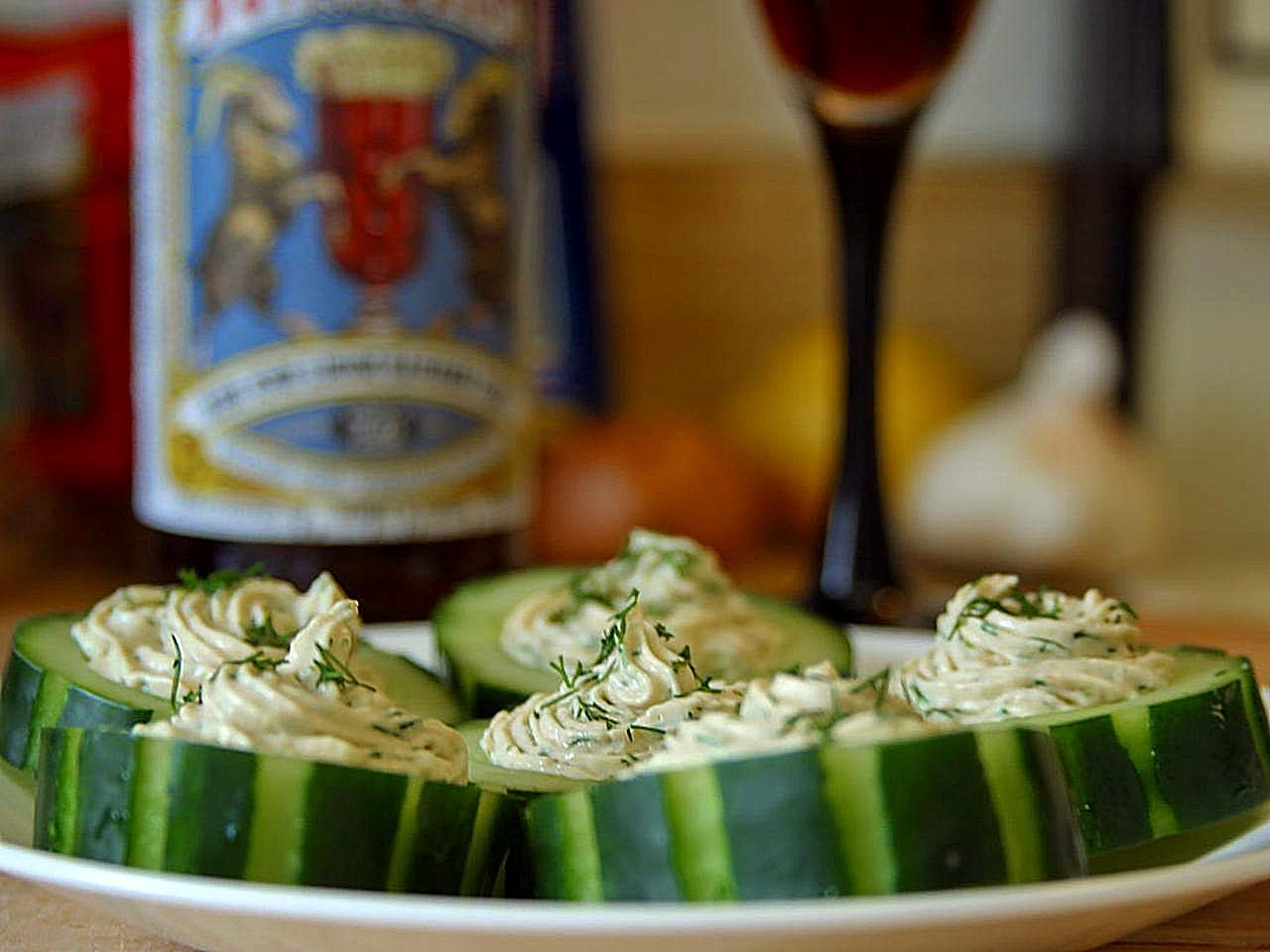
Savory salmon mousse

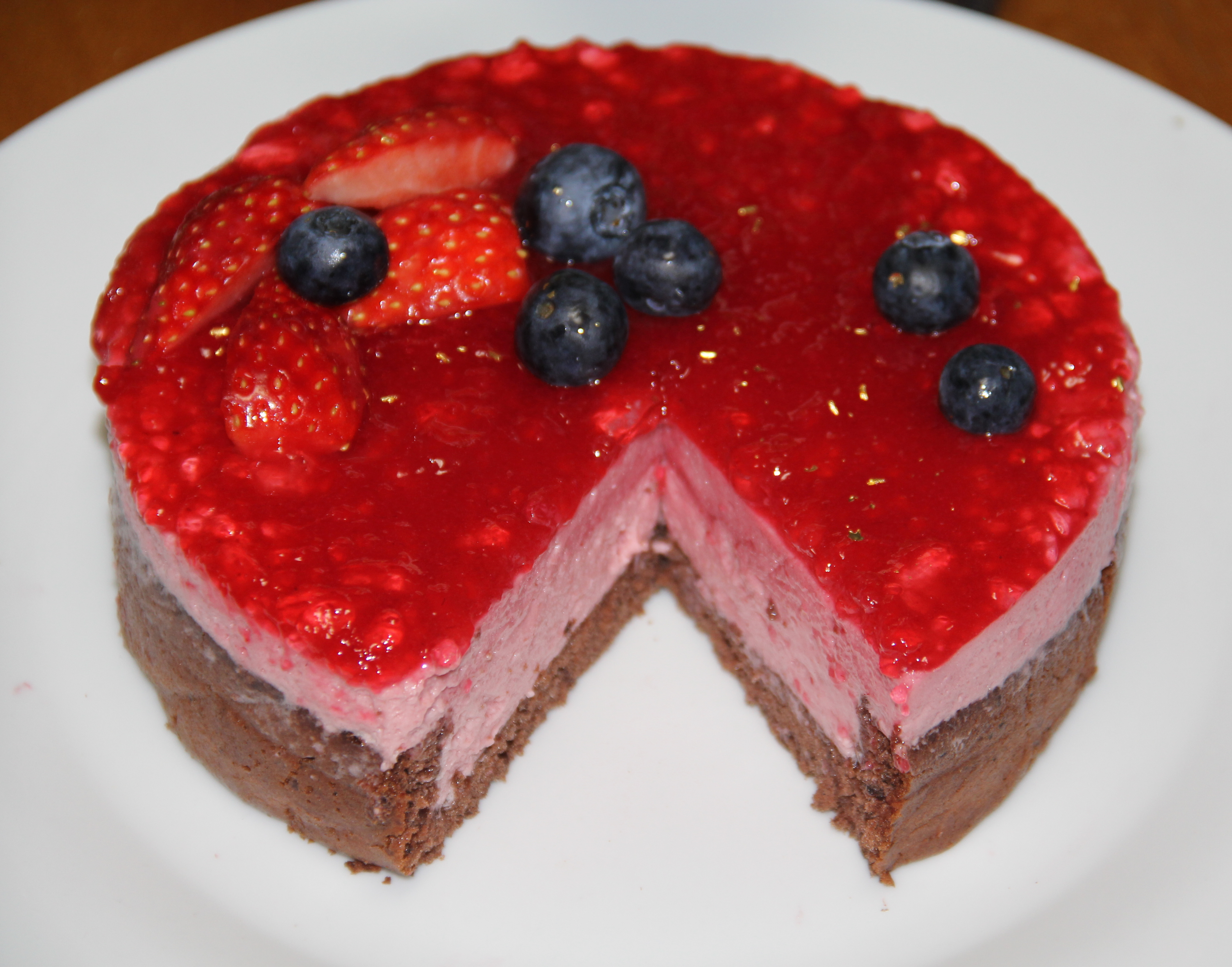
Mousse cake

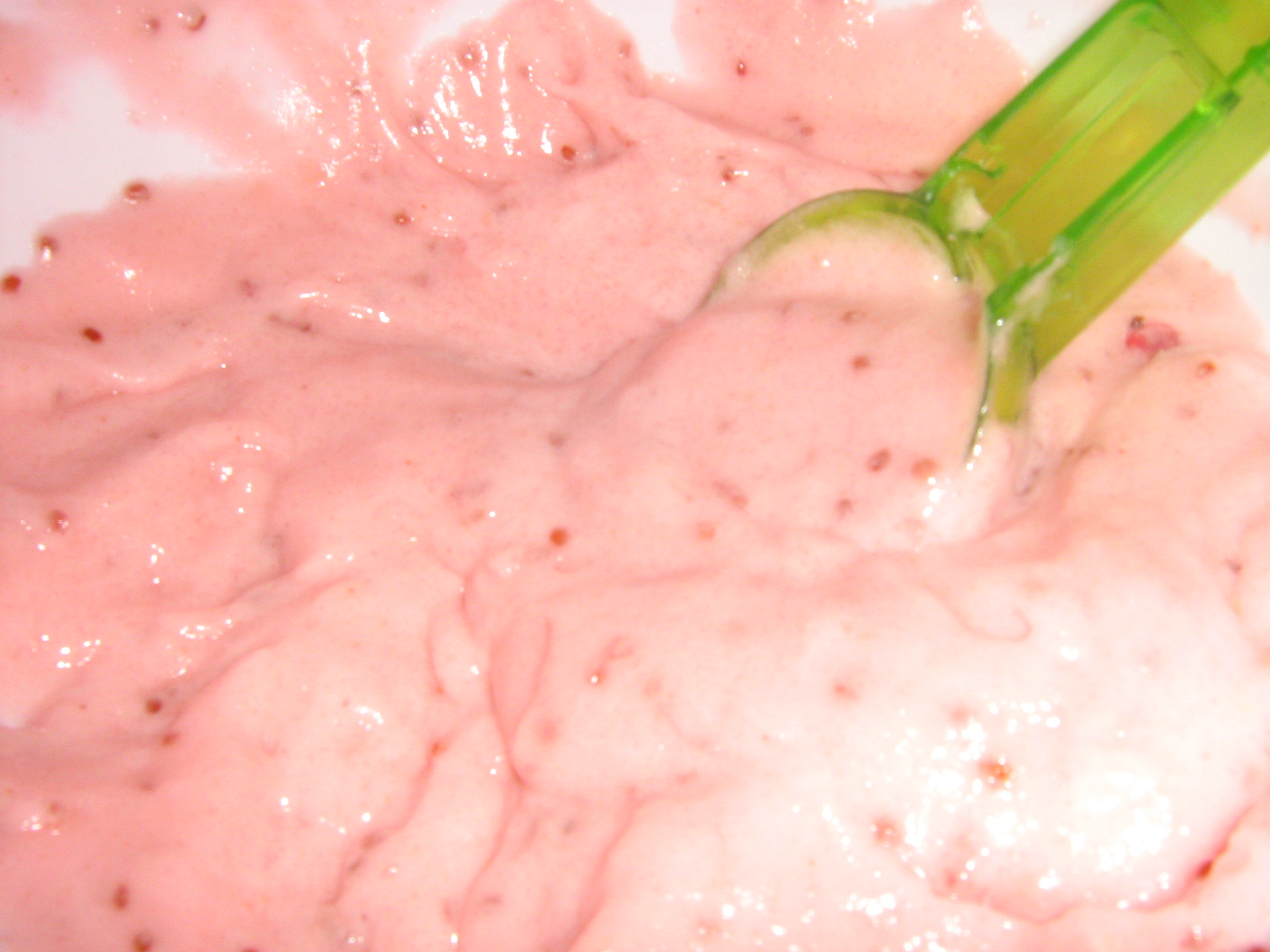
Redcurrant semolina mousse

== See also ==
- Custard
- List of desserts
- Pudding

Media related to Mousse at Wikimedia Commons Chocolate Mousse at the Wikibooks Cookbook subproject
