= Gaines-Burgers =

American brand of dog food

- Product type: Dog food
- Current owner: dVour Brands Corporation
- Produced by: General Foods
- Country: U.S.
- Introduced: 1961
- Discontinued: 1990s (then reissued)
- Previous owners: General Foods
- Website: gainesburgers.com

Gaines-Burgers is an American brand of dog food owned and marketed by dVour Brands Corporation. Gaines-Burgers were introduced in 1961 by General Foods, which ceased their production in the 1990s. The product consists of individually wrapped patties of moist dog food that resemble a hamburger patty.

== History ==
Gaines-Burgers were named after the former Gaines Food Company of Sherburne, New York, a major pet food company acquired by General Foods in 1943. The Gaines Food Co was founded in 1925 by Clarence F. Gaines, a pioneer in dry dog food, and a breeder of pointer dogs and race horses. He was the first to add vitamins to dog food. In 1928, he developed his business with a complete dog food. His product became famous when it was selected to supply food for the sled dogs of the 1939 Byrd Antarctic expedition.

In 1961, 'Gaines-burgers' were launched on the market—a type of dog food designed to look like hamburgers that could be eaten straight from a bowl.

In November 1982, General Foods introduced "Improved Gaines-Burgers Cheese", advertised as made with cheddar cheese. The "improved" reference relates to an earlier version of the product "with cheese" marketed in the early 1970s.

In 1984, General Foods sold Gaines to Anderson, Clayton and Company. In 1986, Quaker Oats Company bought Anderson, Clayton to acquire Gaines for its pet food division; Quaker sold the remainder of Anderson, Clayton to Kraft.

In 2019, dVour Brands Corporation, a company based in Chicago, filed to register rights to the Gaines-Burgers brand. Limited edition premium brand offerings of small batch fresh, slow cooked USDA-approved meat protein patties form were offered in 2020. The product was made available for consumers in limited batches in February 2020. dVour has subsequently made small batches available in limited regional scope outside of the Midwest in 2022, 2022 and planned for 2025.
