= General Foods =

Defunct food company, absorbed into Kraft Foods Inc

General Foods Corporation
- Final logo, designed by Saul Bass, used from 1984 until the merger to Kraft Foods Inc. in 1990
- Type: Subsidiary
- Traded as: NYSE: GF; DJIA component (until 1985); S&P 500 component (1957-1985)
- Industry: Food
- Predecessor: Postum Cereal Company (1895–1929)
- Founded: 1929; 97 years ago
- Defunct: 1990; 36 years ago
- Fate: Merged into Kraft Foods Inc.
- Successor: Mondelez International; Kraft Heinz; JDE Peet's (Now owned by Keurig Dr Pepper); Post Consumer Brands
- Headquarters: Rye Brook, New York, U.S.
- Products: Breakfast cereals, cereal coffee
- Brands: List: Drinks; Maxwell House; Kenco; Gevalia; Kaffee HAG; Sanka; General Foods International; Kool-Aid; Tang (drink mix); Crystal Light; Country Time; Cottee's; Groceries; Calumet; Dream Whip; Oscar Mayer; Shake 'n Bake; Stove Top; Birds Eye; Minute Rice; Cool Whip; Claussen pickles; Bird's Custard; Baked Goods, Snacks, and Desserts; Jell-O; Entenmann's; Baker's Chocolate; Pop Rocks; Log Cabin syrup; Kibon; Kréma; Malabar; Hollywood; Hostess Potato Chips; Hostess Frito-Lay(JV with PepsiCo); Twisties; Post Cereal; Postum; Others; Rax Restaurants; Burger Chef; Gaines-Burgers; Gravy Train
- Parent: Philip Morris (1985–1990)

General Foods Corporation was a company whose direct predecessor was established in the United States by Charles William (C. W.) Post as the Postum Cereal Company in 1895.

The company changed its name to "General Foods" in 1929 following several corporate acquisitions by Marjorie Merriweather Post after she inherited the established cereal business from her father, C. W. Post. In November 1985, General Foods was acquired by Philip Morris Companies (now Altria) for $5.6 billion, the largest non-oil acquisition at the time. In December 1988, Philip Morris acquired Kraft Foods Inc., and, in 1990, combined the two food companies as Kraft General Foods. The "General Foods" name was dropped in 1995 with the corporate name being reverted to Kraft Foods; a line of caffeinated hot beverage mixes continued to carry the General Foods International name until 2010.

== History ==
=== Background ===
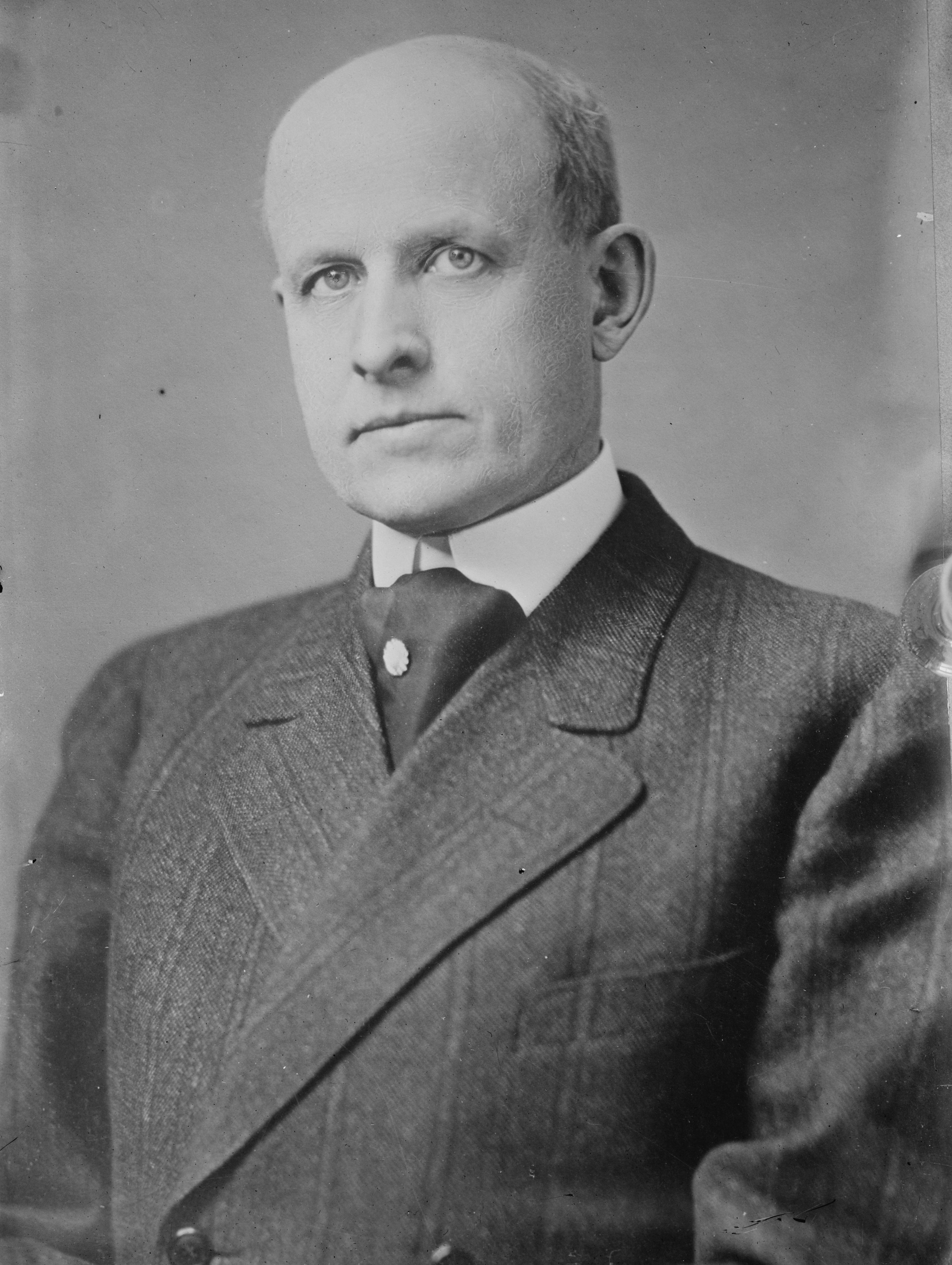
C. W. Post, founder of the Post Cereal Company, predecessor of General Foods

General Foods background can be traced to the Post Cereal Company, founded by C. W. Post in 1895 in Battle Creek, Michigan. Post was a patient at the Battle Creek Sanitarium (run by John Harvey Kellogg, brother of Kellogg Company founder Will Keith Kellogg). Post was inspired by the diet there to start his food company (and become a rival to the Kellogg brothers, who sold their own breakfast cereals). He invested $78 in his initial equipment and supplies and set up manufacturing in a barn on what was known as the 'Old Beardsley Farm'. His first product was Postum, a "cereal beverage" alternative to coffee made from wheat and molasses. The first cereal, Grape-Nuts, was developed in 1897, followed by Elijah's Manna in 1904, which was renamed Post Toasties in 1908.

In 1907 Collier's Weekly published an article questioning the claim made in advertisements for Grape Nuts that it could cure appendicitis. C. W. Post responded with advertisements questioning the mental capacity of the article's author, and Collier's Weekly sued for libel. The case was heard in 1910, and Post was fined $50,000. The decision was overturned on appeal, but advertisements for Postum products stopped making such claims.

=== General Foods ===
C.W. Post died in 1914, and his daughter Marjorie Merriweather Post took over the company. The Postum Cereals company acquired other companies such as Jell-O (gelatin dessert) in 1925, Walter Baker & Company (chocolate) and Hellmann's (sauces) in 1927, Maxwell House (coffee) in 1928, and other food brands.

By far the most important acquisition in 1929 was of the frozen-food company owned by Clarence Birdseye, called General Seafood Corporation. Birdseye (December 9, 1886 - October 7, 1956) was one of the most important entrepreneurs in the history of the food industry. Born in New York City, he became interested in the frozen preservation of food during the course of working as a fur trader in Labrador between 1912 and 1916. By 1923, he had developed a commercially viable process for quick-freezing foods using a belt mechanism, which he patented. In 1924, with backing from three investors, he formed the "General Seafoods Company" in Gloucester, Massachusetts to produce frozen haddock fillets packed in plain cardboard boxes.

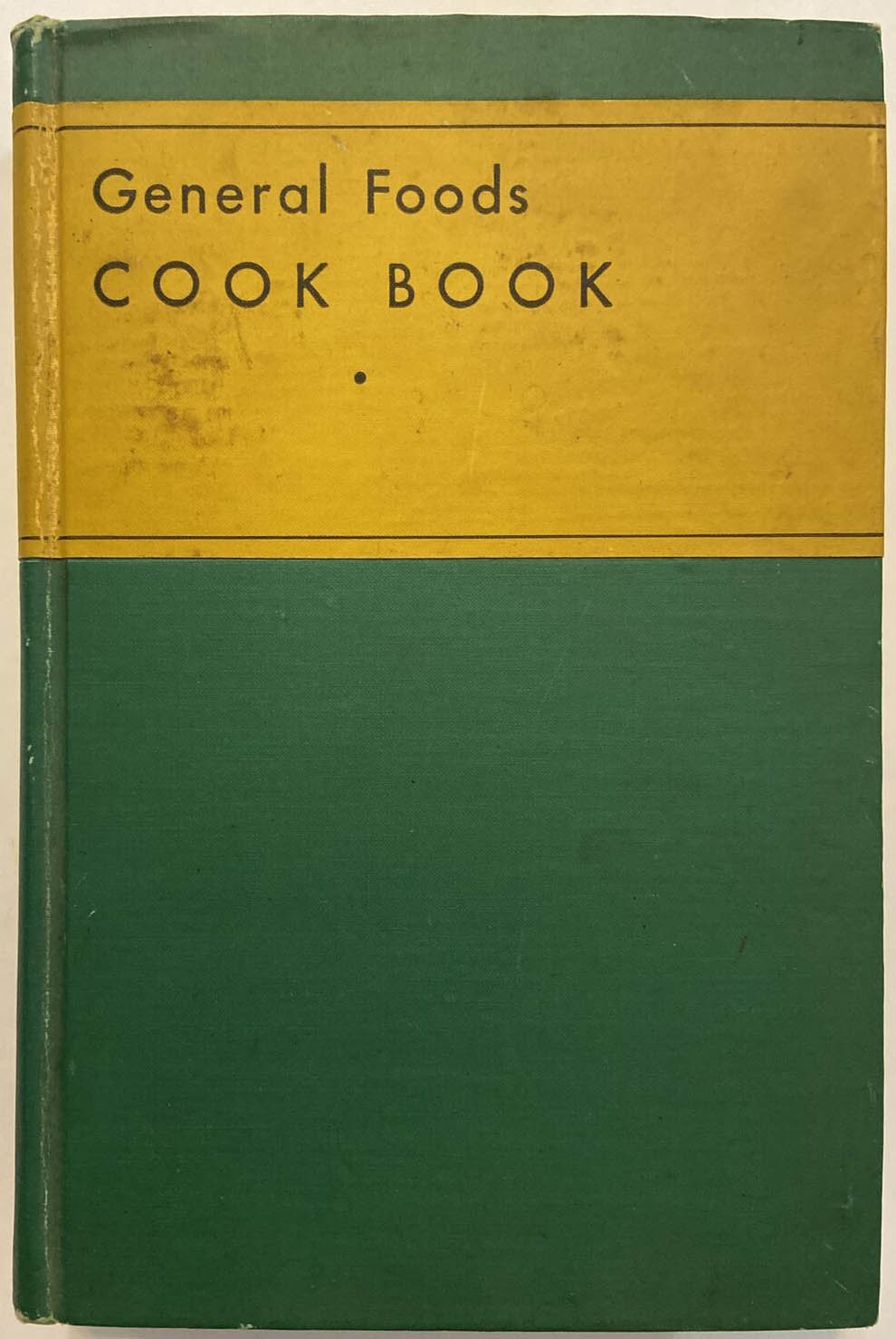
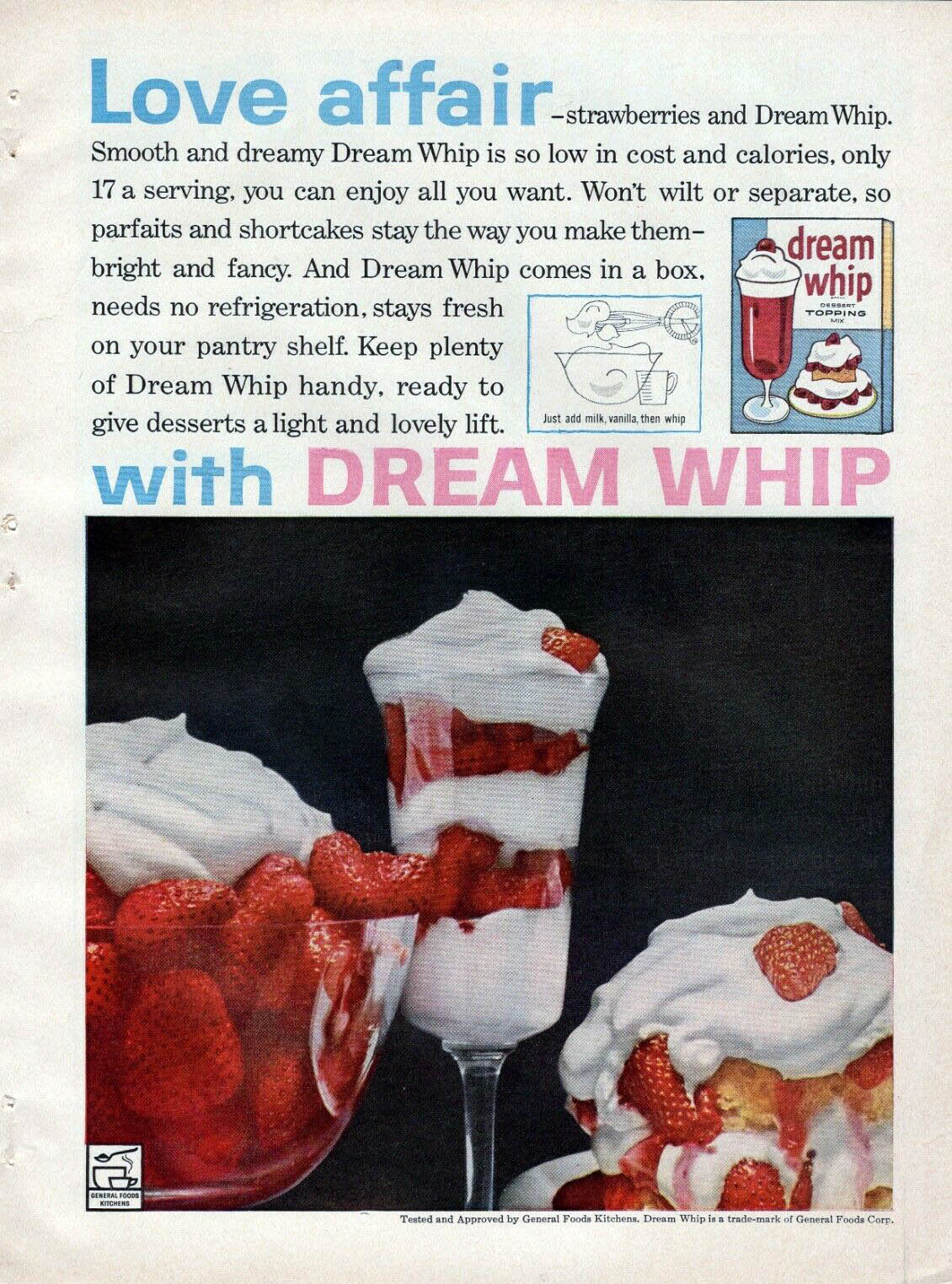
(Left): General Foods Cookbook launched in 1932; (right): magazine ad for Dream Whip topping in the 1960s.

The founder's daughter, Marjorie Merriweather Post, was the first to become excited about the prospects for the frozen foods business. In 1926, she had put into port at Gloucester on her yacht, Sea Cloud, and was served a luncheon meal which, she learned to her amazement, had been frozen six months before. Despite her enthusiasm, it took Post three years to convince Postum's management to acquire the company. Postum paid $10.75 million for a 51% interest and its partner, Goldman Sachs, paid $12.5 million for the other 49%. Following this acquisition, Postum, Inc changed its name to General Foods Corporation. Goldman sold its share back to General Foods in 1932, apparently at a slight loss.

Shortly after the acquisition, General Foods began test-marketing an expanded line of frozen foods, but the company quickly realized that a packaging process alone would not be sufficient to market frozen products in stores. To be sold, the packages had to be kept frozen while on display, so Birdseye engineers began development of a freezer cabinet designed specifically to hold frozen foods. The cabinet, which first appeared in 1934, required a great deal of space and electricity, which were not readily available in most grocery stores of the period. For those stores that could accommodate them, the payback was immediate. Housewives quickly realized that keeping packages of frozen food in the icebox could mean fresher meals and fewer trips to the market.

Company's longest-lasting logo, designed by Walter Dorwin Teague Associates, used from 1962 to 1984

The company published a cookbook in 1932 called the General Foods Cook Book dedicated "To the American homemaker". Five editions were published between 1932 and 1937. The book includes photographs (among which is "General Foods offers over twenty famous products for your well-stocked pantry shelf") and a subject index.

General Foods acquired the Perkins Product Company, the makers of Kool-Aid, in 1953, Burger Chef in 1968, Oscar Mayer in 1981, Entenmann's in 1982, Oroweat in 1984, and the Freihofer baking company in 1987. The company then sold Burger Chef to Imasco, owner of Hardee's, in 1981.

General Foods was acquired by Philip Morris Companies (now Altria) in 1985 for $5.8 billion. In 1989, Phillip Morris merged General Foods with Kraft Foods Inc., which it had acquired in 1987, to form the Kraft General Foods division. The cereal brands of Nabisco were acquired in 1993. In 1995 Kraft General Foods was reorganized, and the Kraft Foods name was restored. On November 15, 2007, Kraft announced it would spin off Post Cereals and merge that business with Ralcorp Holdings. That merger was completed August 4, 2008, at which time the official name of the company became Post Foods, LLC. In 2012, the original Kraft Foods Inc. was split into grocery and snack food companies with the grocery unit retaining the Kraft Foods name and the snack brands becoming Mondelez International. The company was then subsequently merged with Heinz Foods in 2015 to form Kraft Heinz.

== See also ==
- 800 Westchester Avenue (former headquarters)
