= Schweighouse-Thann =

Commune in Grand Est, France

- Commune
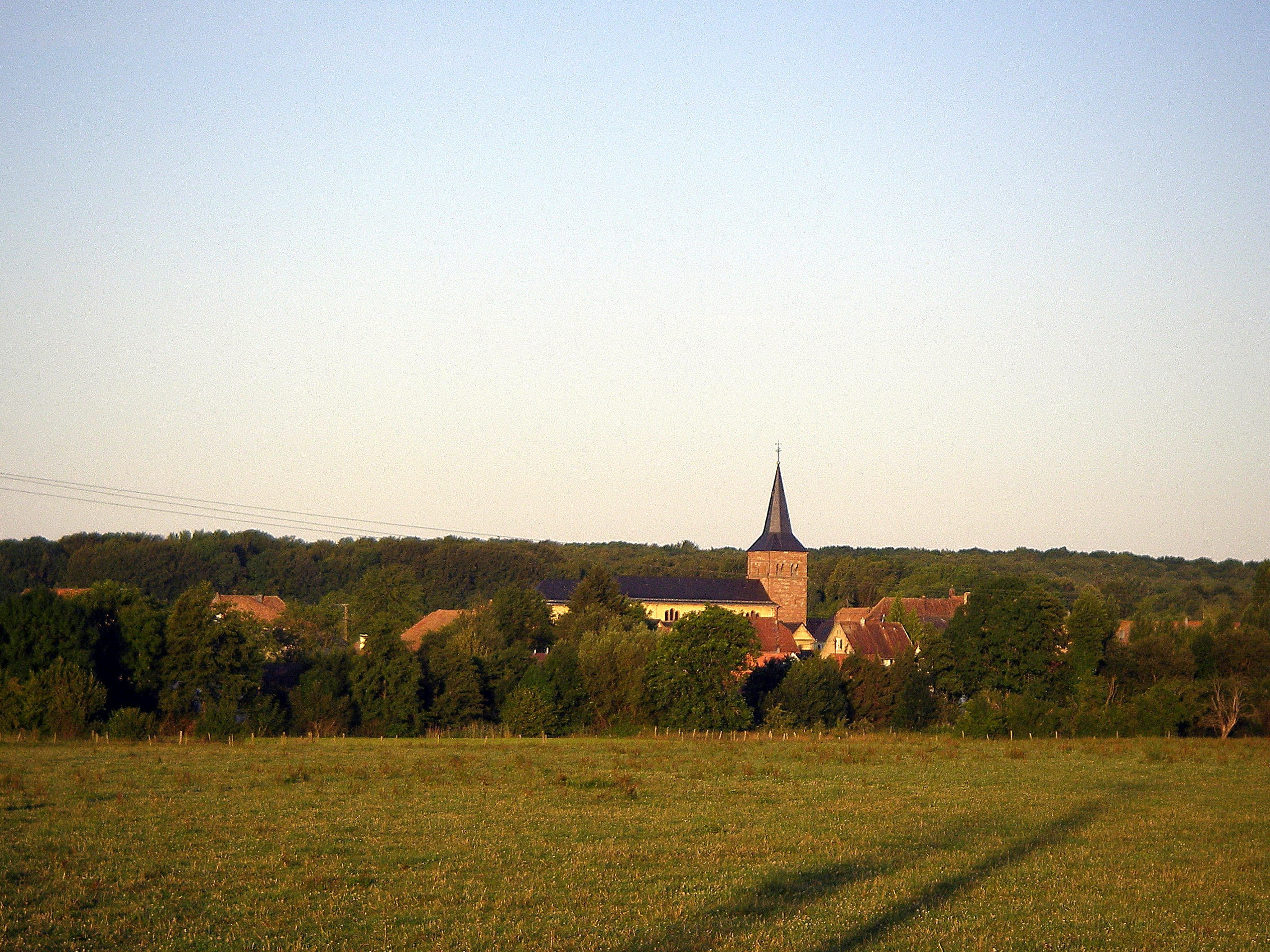
- A general view of Schweighouse-Thann

- Coat of arms
- Location of Schweighouse-Thann
- Location within France Location within Grand Est
- Coordinates: 47°45′12″N 7°10′18″E
- Country: France
- Region: Grand Est
- Department: Haut-Rhin
- Arrondissement: Thann-Guebwiller
- Canton: Cernay

Government
  - Mayor (2020–2026): Bruno Lehmann
- Area^{1}: 10.78 km^{2} (4.16 sq mi)
- Elevation: 380 m (1,250 ft)
- Highest elevation: 329 m (1,079 ft)
- Lowest elevation: 271 m (889 ft)
- Population (2023): 748
  - Density: 69.4/km^{2} (180/sq mi)
- Time zone: UTC+01:00 (CET)
  - Summer (DST): UTC+02:00 (CEST)
- INSEE/Postal code: 68302 /68520
- ^{1} French Land Register data, which excludes lakes, ponds, glaciers > 1 km^{2} (0.386 sq mi or 247 acres) and river estuaries.

Schweighouse-Thann (German pronunciation: [ʃvaiɡuz tan]; German: Schweighausen) is a commune in the Haut-Rhin department in Grand Est in north-eastern France.

== See also ==
- Communes of the Haut-Rhin department
