= Kibbles 'n Bits =

Brand of dog food by Post

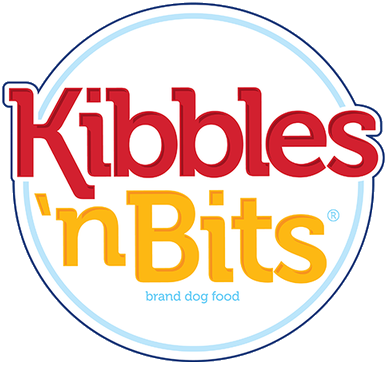
- Product type: Dog food
- Current owner: Post Consumer Brands
- Country: U.S.
- Introduced: 1981; 45 years ago
- Previous owners: Quaker Oats Company; Heinz; Big Heart Pet Brands; J.M. Smucker
- Website: kibblesnbits.com

Kibbles 'n Bits is a brand name for dog food that The J.M. Smucker Co. decided to include among the pet food brands sold to Post Holdings. On April 28, 2023, PH announced that it had completed the acquisition of Kibbles 'n Bits, which is now marketed by Post Consumer Brands.

== History ==
The brand was originally created in 1981 as the first dual textured dog food, having soft chewy pieces as well as hard crunchy ones. It was developed by Quaker Oats as part of their Ken'l Ration brand.

In 1983, more bits ingredients were added to the dog food and the brand was renamed "Kibbles 'n Bits 'n Bits 'n Bits." The addition of more bits and popular ads increased sales by double their estimates.

In 1995, Kibbles 'n Bits was acquired by Heinz, which in turn sold their pet food division to Del Monte Foods later on. The Lawrence, Kansas plant produces around 1.7 million pounds a day, 9.9 million pounds a week and around 497 million pounds of Kibbles 'n Bits dog food a year.

The J.M. Smucker Co. took control of Kibbles 'n Bits in 2015, when it acquired the company that marketed it, Big Heart Pet Brands. In 2023, the brand was acquired by Post Holdings, Inc. and started to be marketed by Post Consumer Brands.

Kibbles 'n Bits was among several brands recalled in February 2018 due to FDA findings of sodium pentobarbital, a drug used in euthanasia.
