= Cool Whip =

American whipped topping brand

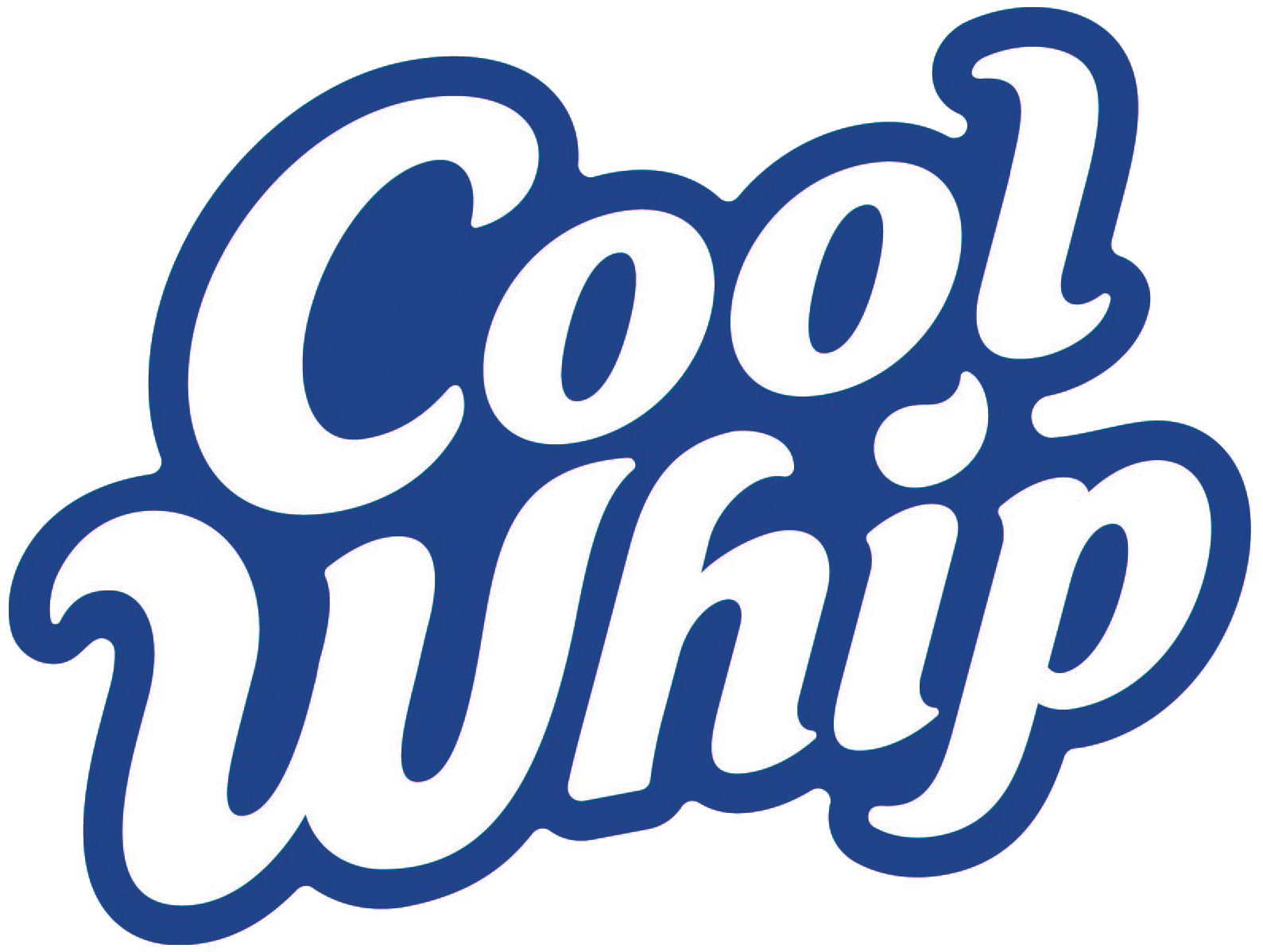

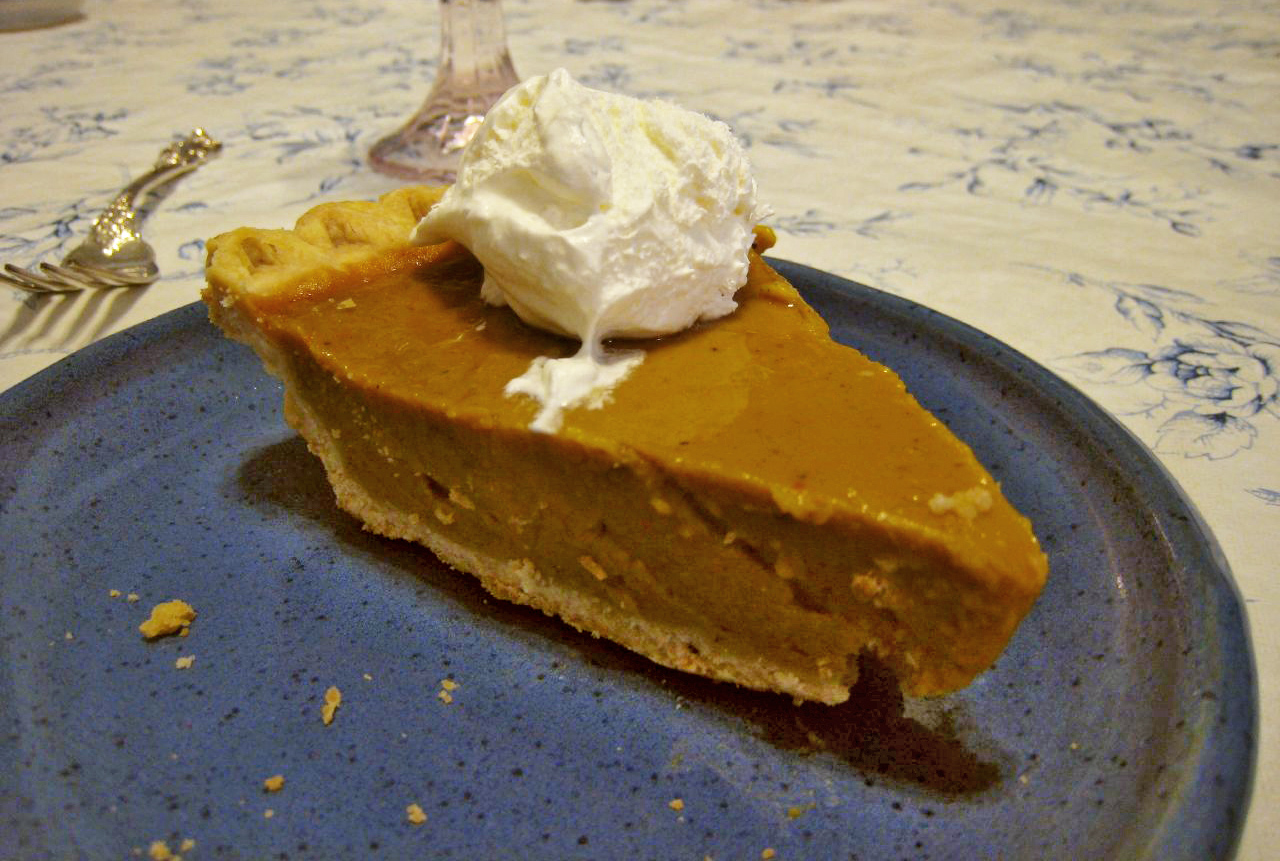
- Pumpkin pie topped with a dollop of Cool Whip
- Product type: Whipped topping
- Current owner: Kraft Heinz
- Country: United States
- Introduced: 1966; 60 years ago
- Previous owners: General Foods; Kraft General Foods; Kraft Foods
- Website: kraftheinz.com/cool-whip

Cool Whip is an American whipped topping brand owned by Kraft Heinz. It is used in North America as a topping for desserts, and in some no-bake pie recipes as a convenience food or ingredient that does not require physical whipping and can maintain its texture without melting over time. It is also used as a base and core ingredient in some desserts, such as Watergate Salad.

Cool Whip is sold frozen and must be defrosted before being used. It has a longer shelf life than cream while frozen. On the other hand, it does not have the same flavor or texture as whipped cream, and costs nearly 50% more per ounce. It was originally marketed as being "non-dairy" despite containing the milk protein casein.

== History ==
Cool Whip was created in 1966 by food scientist William A. Mitchell. The key advantage of his invention was that the product could be distributed frozen.

The Birds Eye division of General Foods, now part of Kraft Heinz, introduced the product to market. Within two years of introduction, it became the largest and most profitable product in the Birds Eye line of products. Cool Whip is now the most consumed brand of whipped topping in the U.S.

== Manufacture and market ==
Cool Whip is manufactured in Avon, New York, for the American and Canadian markets. It is sold frozen in eight-ounce (226-gram) and larger plastic tubs and is refrigerated prior to serving. Each nine-gram serving provides 25 kcal (105 kJ) of energy, of which 1.5 grams or 15 kcal (63 kJ) are from fat.

Varieties offered include Original, Extra Creamy, Light, Free (fat-free), and Sugar-Free (made with NutraSweet). In Canada, the fat-free variety is labeled as Ultra-low Fat. Seasonal flavors include French vanilla, chocolate, and sweet cinnamon, all introduced in 2011; strawberry and peppermint, introduced in 2016; and cheesecake, introduced in 2017.

Cool Whip remains the most popular brand of whipped topping in the United States, with Reddi-wip (whipped cream in an aerosol can) ranking second. Dream Whip is another brand of whipped dessert topping, but is sold as a powder.

== Ingredients ==
Cool Whip Original is made of water, hydrogenated vegetable oil (including coconut and palm kernel oils), high fructose corn syrup, corn syrup, skimmed milk, light cream (less than 2%), sodium caseinate, natural and artificial flavor, xanthan and guar gums, polysorbate 60, sorbitan monostearate, sodium polyphosphate, and beta carotene (as a colouring). Cool Whip is available in an aerosol can using nitrous oxide as a propellant.

From its introduction, Cool Whip was labeled and advertised as non-dairy, but as of 2018 it contains skimmed milk and sodium caseinate, a milk derivative. Even before the skimmed milk was introduced, Cool Whip was classified in Jewish dietary traditions as dairy because of the sodium caseinate.

== See also ==
- Dream Whip, a powdered whipped topping mix
- Mr. Whippy, in the United Kingdom
- Miracle Whip, a Kraft-brand mayonnaise substitute
- Non-dairy creamer, with similar ingredients
- Reddi-Wip, whipped cream in a can

== General and cited references ==
- William Shurtleff, Akiko Aoyagi, History of Non-dairy Whip Topping, Coffee Creamer, Cottage Cheese, and Icing/Frosting (With and Without Soy) (1900-2013): Extensively Annotated Bibliography and Sourcebook, SoyInfo Center, 2013
