= Whipped cream =

Semi-solid aerated cream

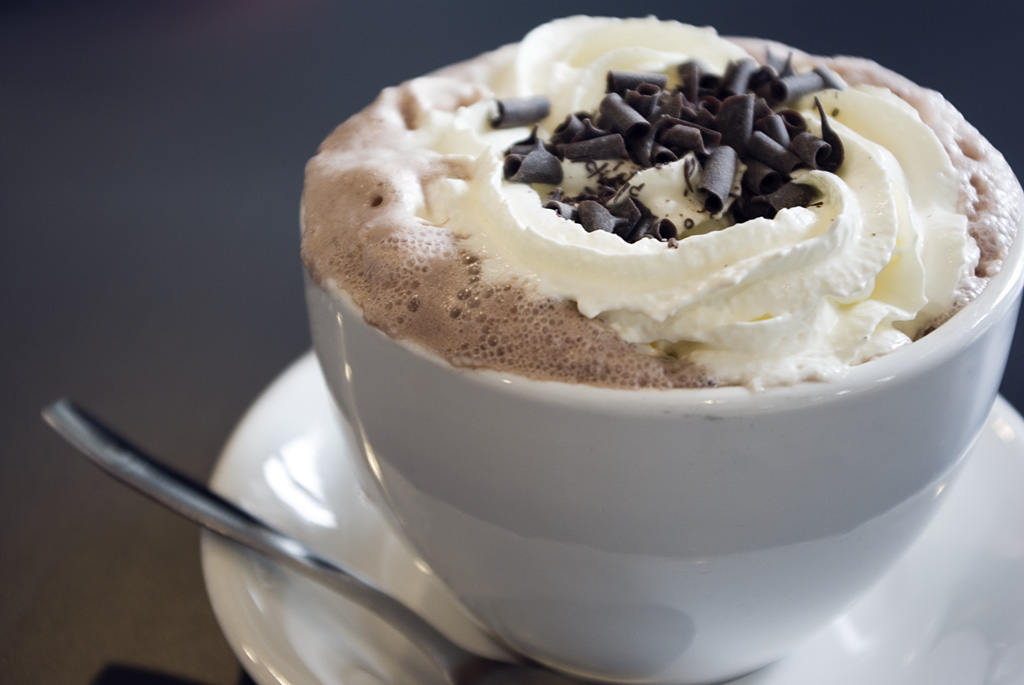
- A cup of hot chocolate topped with whipped cream from a pressurized can
- Type: Cream
- Place of origin: France
- Main ingredients: Cream
- Variations: Added sugar and other flavorings, such as vanilla

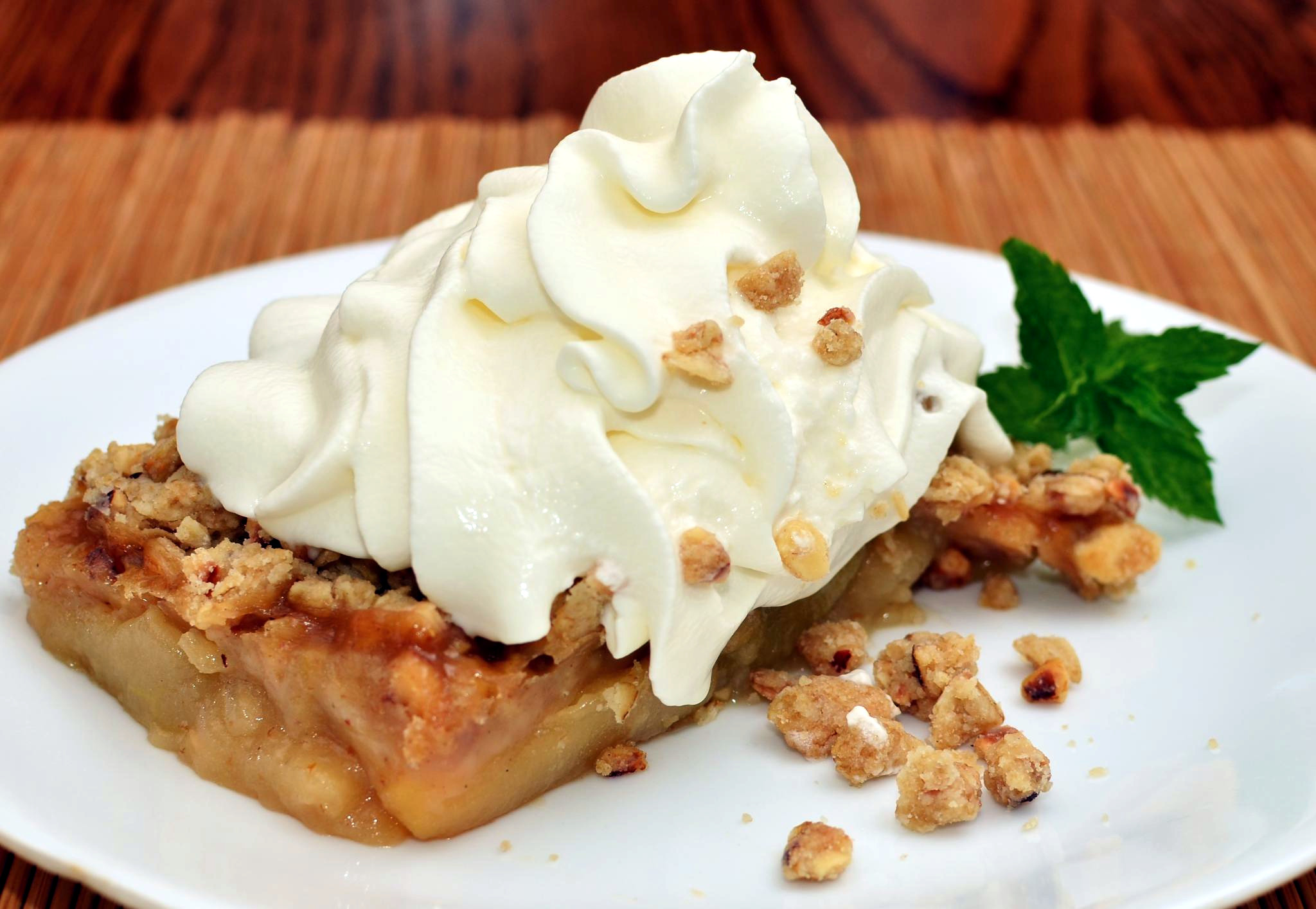
Apple crisp with whipped cream

Whipped cream, also known as Chantilly cream or crème Chantilly (French: [kʁɛm ʃɑ̃tiji]), is high-fat dairy cream, known as heavy cream, whipping cream or double cream, that is aerated by whisking until it becomes light, fluffy, and capable of holding its shape. This process incorporates air into the cream, creating a semi-solid colloid. It is commonly sweetened with white sugar and often flavored with vanilla. Whipped cream is often served on desserts and hot beverages and used as an ingredient in desserts.

== History ==
Les mousses se font avec de la crême bien douce & peu épaisse; on la fouette, ce qui la fait mousser, & c'est de cette mousse qu'on fait usage : on peut lui donner tel goût que l'on veut, aromates, fleurs, fruits, vins, ou liqueurs.

Mousses are made with sweet cream, not very thick; one whips it, which makes it foam, and it is this foam that one uses: one may give it whatever flavor one wants, with aromatics, flowers, fruits, wines, or liqueurs.

— M. Emy, 1768

A dish called αφρόγαλo (aphrogalo) 'frothy milk' is mentioned by Galen but with no further information. One modern author calls it a "popular milk foam" and suggests that it was "possibly a forerunner of whipped cream".

The earliest clear evidence for whipped cream, often sweetened and aromatised, comes in the 16th century, under the name milk or cream snow (neve di latte, neige de lait, neige de crème). It was mentioned in the writings of Rabelais (Paris, 1531) and recipes are found in Cristoforo di Messisbugo (Ferrara, 1549), Bartolomeo Scappi (Rome, 1570), and Lancelot de Casteau (Liège, 1604). A recipe for sneeu 'snow', is found in a manuscript from the Netherlands from circa 1525–1575. It consists of cream, rosewater, and sugar beaten with a woody switch split at the end. The resulting froth was drained on a sieve.

The recipe "A Dyschefull of Snow" in A Proper Newe Booke of Cokerye (London, 1545) is made of a mixture of egg whites and cream. Flavored with rosewater and sugar, it was served over a "thick bush of rosemary", and sometimes gilded, as a centerpiece for banquets. Later, this dish was called "cream with snow", "snow cream" (not the same as the snow-based dish snow cream), and "blanched cream".

In these recipes, and until the end of the 19th century, naturally separated cream is whipped, typically with willow or rush branches, and the resulting foam ("snow") on the surface is from time to time skimmed off and drained. By the end of the 19th century, centrifuge separation was used to rapidly produce high-fat cream suitable for whipping.

The French name crème fouettée for whipped cream is attested in 1629, and the English name "whipped cream" in 1673. The name "snow cream" continued to be used in the 17th century. At the end of the 18th century, "whisked cream" could mean both whipped cream as well as cream curdled with wine and lemon to make a syllabub.

Various desserts consisting of whipped cream in pyramidal shapes with coffee, liqueurs, chocolate, fruits, and so on either in the mixture or poured on top were called crème en mousse (cream in a foam), crème fouettée, crème mousseuse (foamy cream), mousse (foam), and fromage à la Chantilly (Chantilly-style molded cream), as early as 1768. Modern mousses, including mousse au chocolat, are a continuation of this tradition.

Cream whipped in a whipping siphon with nitrous oxide was invented in the 1930s by both Charles Getz, working with G. Frederick Smith, and Marshall Reinecke. Both filed patents, which were later litigated. The Getz patents were originally deemed invalid, but were upheld on appeal.

=== Crème Chantilly ===
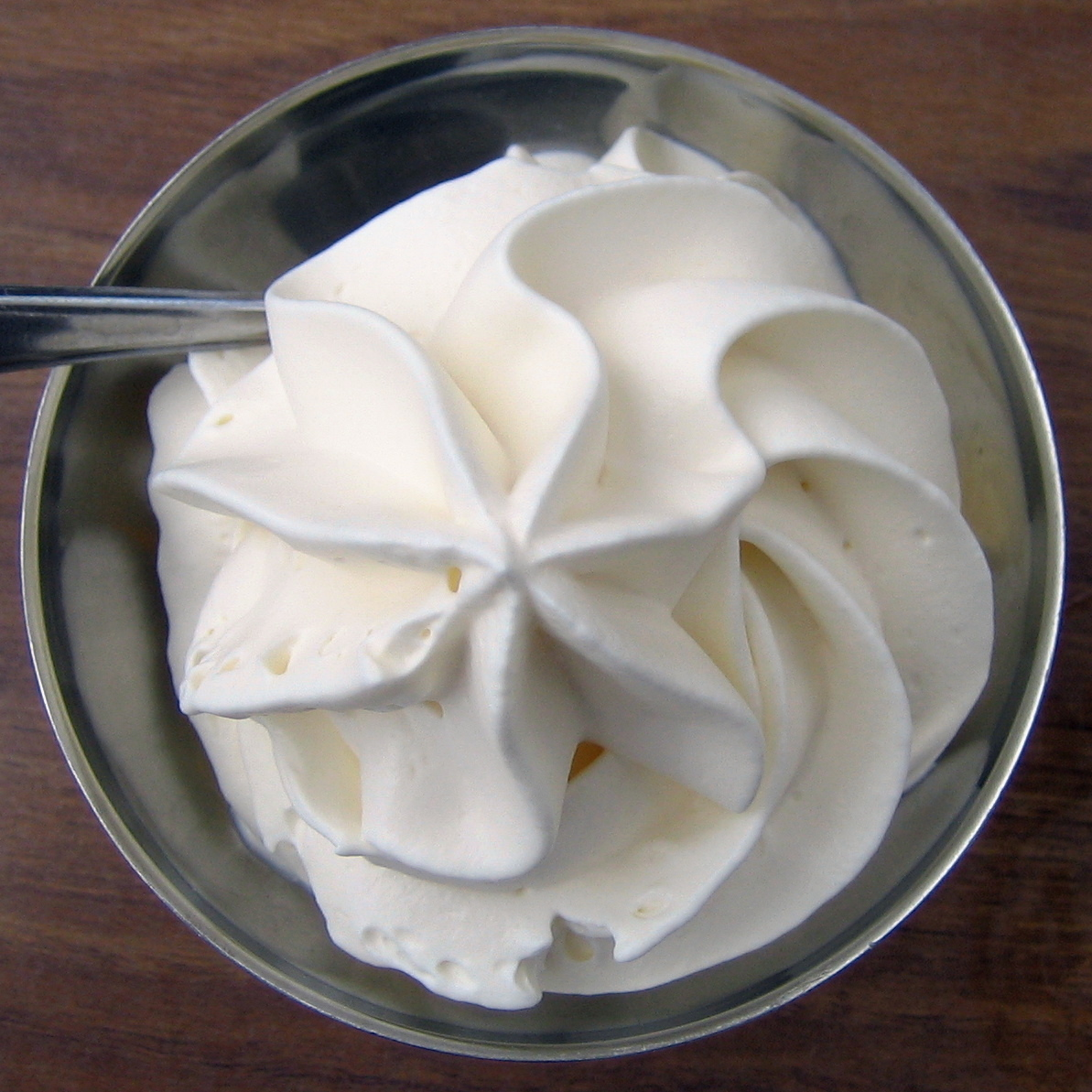
Crème Chantilly

Crème Chantilly is another name for whipped cream. Sometimes the two are distinguished clearly, with crème Chantilly being whipped cream that has been sweetened. Other times, they are treated as synonyms, with both being sweetened or neither being sweetened, or indeed with sweetening unspecified or optional. Many authors use only one of the two names (for the sweetened or unsweetened version), so it is not clear whether they distinguish the two. Escoffier's Guide culinaire defines "whipped or chantilly cream" as flavored with vanilla sugar, but includes many savory recipes with unsweetened "whipped cream", never called "chantilly cream". Vanilla or fruit essences are often added.

The invention of crème Chantilly is often credited incorrectly, and without evidence, to François Vatel, maître d'hôtel at the Château de Chantilly in the mid-17th century. The name Chantilly, though, is first connected with whipped cream in the mid-18th century, around the time that the Baronne d'Oberkirch praised the "cream" served at a lunch at the Hameau de Chantilly—but did not say what exactly it was, or call it Chantilly cream.

The names crème Chantilly, crème de Chantilly, crème à la Chantilly, or crème fouettée à la Chantilly only become common in the 19th century. In 1806, the first edition of Viard's Cuisinier Impérial mentions neither "whipped" nor "Chantilly" cream, but the 1820 edition mentions both.

The name Chantilly was probably used because the château had become a symbol of refined food; the word Chantilly by itself has since become a culinary shorthand for whipped cream.

== Physical properties ==
Cream with high butterfat content—typically 30%–36%—is used for whipping, as fat globules contribute to forming stable air bubbles.

During whipping, partially coalesced fat molecules create a stabilized network that traps air bubbles. The resulting colloid has about twice the volume of the original cream. If whipping is prolonged further, the fat droplets stick together, destroying the colloid and forming butter. Low-fat cream, or milk, does not have enough fat to whip effectively.

== Production ==
=== Manual ===
Cream is usually whipped with a whisk, an electric hand mixer, or a food processor. Results are best when the equipment and ingredients are chilled. The bubbles in the whipped cream immediately start to pop, and it begins to liquefy, giving it a useful lifetime of one to two hours.

Many 19th-century recipes recommend adding gum tragacanth to stabilize whipped cream, while a few include whipped egg whites. Various other substances, including gelatin and diphosphate, are used in commercial stabilizers.

=== Instant ===
Cream aerated by an aerosol can or by a whipping siphon with a whipped-cream charger is sometimes described as whipped cream; it is similar to cream that has been aerated by whipping. A gas dissolves in the butterfat under pressure; when the pressure is released, the gas comes out of solution, forming small bubbles "aerating" the mass. Nitrous oxide gas is usually used; while carbon dioxide produces the same physical effect, it gives a sour taste. Cream supplied in an aerosol can is also known as skooshy cream (Scottish), squirty cream, spray cream, or aerosol cream. There are many brands of aerosol cream, with varying sweeteners and other factors. In some jurisdictions, sales of canned whipped cream are limited to avoid nitrous oxide abuse.

=== Flavorings ===
Whipped cream can be flavored with sugar, vanilla, coffee, chocolate, orange, or other flavorings.

=== Alcohol-infused whipped cream ===
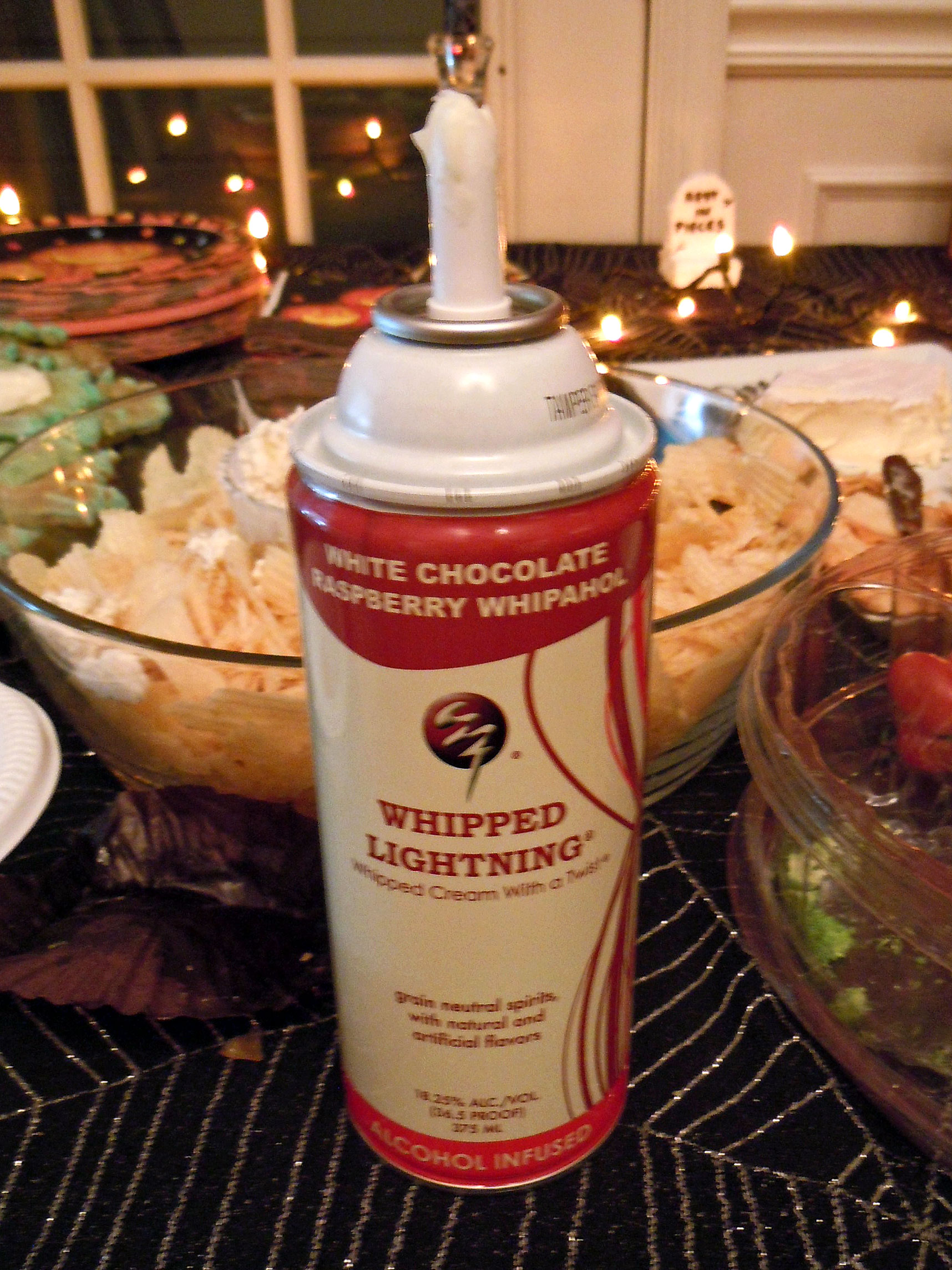
Alcohol-infused whipped cream.

Alcohol-infused whipped cream is mixed with an alcoholic beverage. Commercial versions were introduced in the U.S. by 2005, and became a fad in 2010. Brand names include Liquor Whipped (14% alcohol by volume); CREAM (15%); Whipped Lightning (17.8%), made in various flavors; Get Whipped, Whipsy, which is 13.5% and made with wine; and Canisters of Cream.

It has been criticized for their potential to be "aimed at young drinkers". "If a product looks like something else, it's easy not to be aware that it might contain a lot of alcohol", a public health official observed. In the U.S., the sale of alcohol-infused whipped cream is regulated as a "distilled spirits specialty product".

== Imitation whipped cream ==
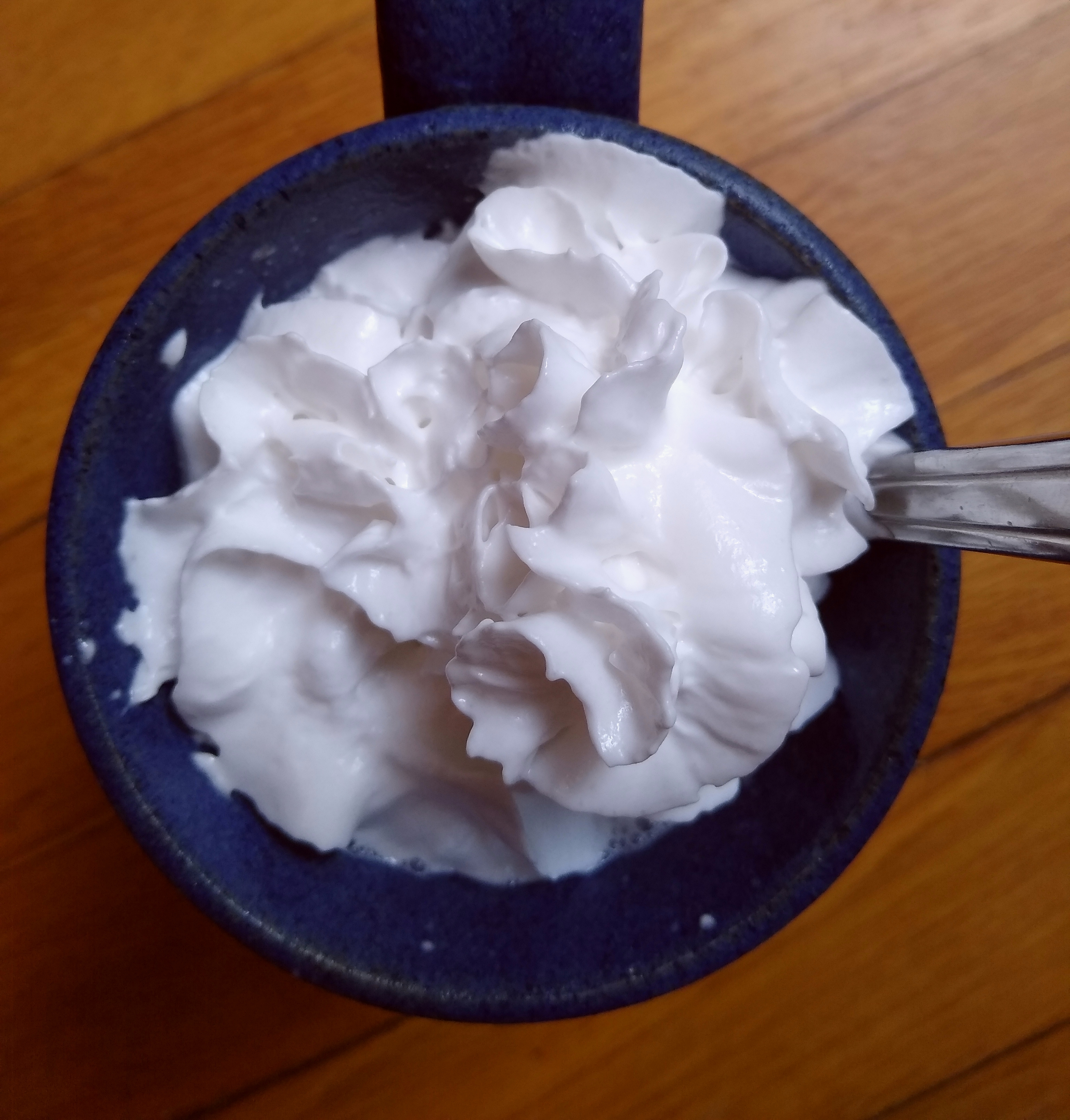
Vegan coconut whipped topping

Imitations of whipped cream, often called whipped topping (occasionally whip topping), are commercially available. They may be used to avoid dairy ingredients, to provide extended shelf life, or to reduce the price — although some popular brands cost twice as much as whipped cream.

The earliest known recipe for a non-dairy "whipped cream" was published by Ella Eaton Kellogg in 1904; consistent with her Seventh-day Adventist practices, it replaced cream with almond butter. Based on research sponsored by Henry Ford, a soy-based whip topping was commercialized by Delsoy Products by 1945. Delsoy did not survive, but Bob Rich's Rich Products frozen "Whip Topping", also introduced in 1945, succeeded. Rich Products topping was reformulated with coconut oil replacing soy oil in 1956.

Artificial whipped topping normally contains some mixture of partially hydrogenated oil, sweeteners, water, and stabilizers and emulsifiers added to prevent syneresis. For purposes of regulation this is called "whipped edible oil topping" in the US.

Non-dairy versions may be sold frozen in plastic tubs (e.g., Cool Whip), in aerosol containers, or in liquid form in cartons.

== Uses ==
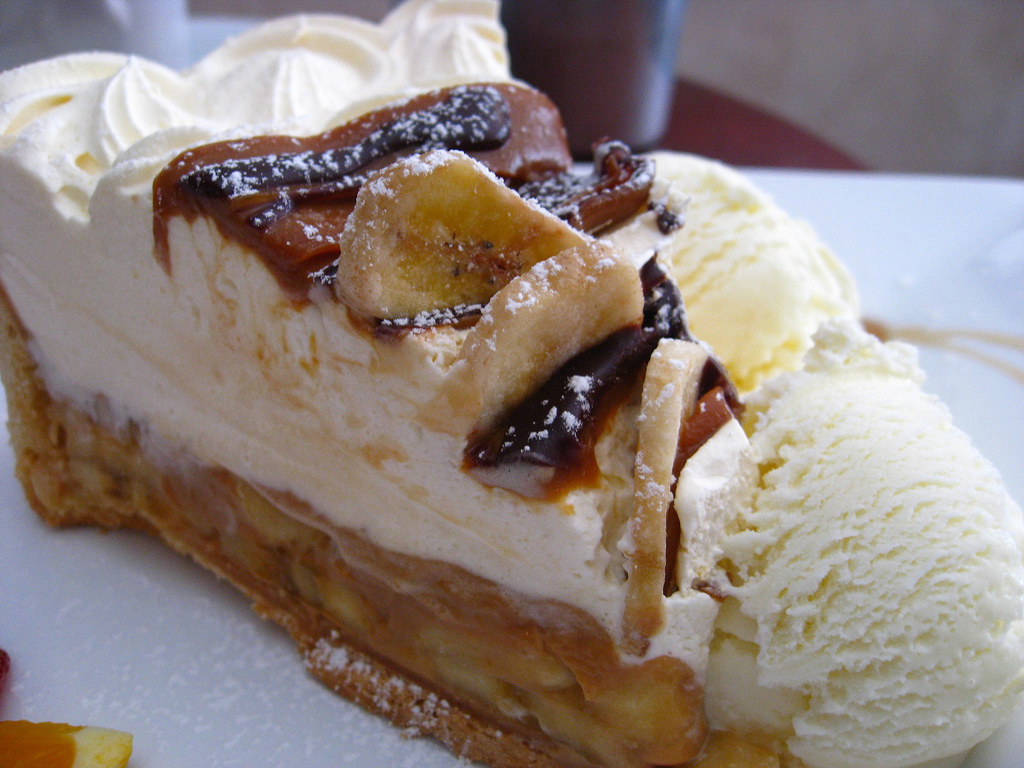
Banoffee pie

=== Sweet ===
Whipped cream is a popular topping for fruit and desserts such as pie, ice cream (especially sundaes), cupcakes, cakes, milkshakes, waffles, cheesecakes, gelatin dessert, and puddings. It is also served on coffee and hot chocolate. In the Viennese coffee house tradition, coffee with whipped cream is known as Melange mit Schlagobers. Whipped cream is used as an ingredient in many desserts, for example as a filling for profiteroles and layer cakes, and the final step of making Bavarian cream. and some fruit sorbets.

It is often piped onto a dish using a pastry bag to create decorative shapes.

Mousse desserts are usually based on whipped cream, often with added egg white foam. Similarly, crémet d'Anjou is made of whipped cream and whipped egg whites. Fontainebleau and crémet d'Anjou include whipped cream and whipped fromage frais, and are typically served in a cheese drainer (faisselle), recalling the former process of draining whipped cream. Fruit "creams" of strawberry, raspberry, or currants were made with the syrup of the cooked fruit added to cream before "whisking", and some whole fruit added afterwards.

Whipped cream may be also be part of batters for pancakes.

=== Savory ===
Unsweetened whipped cream is an ingredient in many savory preparations.

It is added to base sauces to make a lighter daughter sauce ("small compound sauce"), such as mousseline sauce, a Hollandaise sauce lightened with whipped cream; and Chantilly sauce or Chantilly mayonnaise consisting of mayonnaise plus whipped cream.

It may be added to forcemeats for quenelles.

Savory mousses consist of a smooth purée with whipped cream, e.g. of lobster, crayfish,

Chef Thomas Keller's unorthodox recipe for risotto is finished with whipped cream.

== See also ==
Media related to Whipped cream at Wikimedia Commons Basic Whipped Cream at the Wikibooks Cookbook subproject

- Dream Whip – a powdered dessert topping mix
- Reddi-Wip – a brand
- Schlagobers – Richard Strauss' "Whipped Cream" ballet
