= Pop Rocks =

Type of candy

Strawberry Pop Rocks

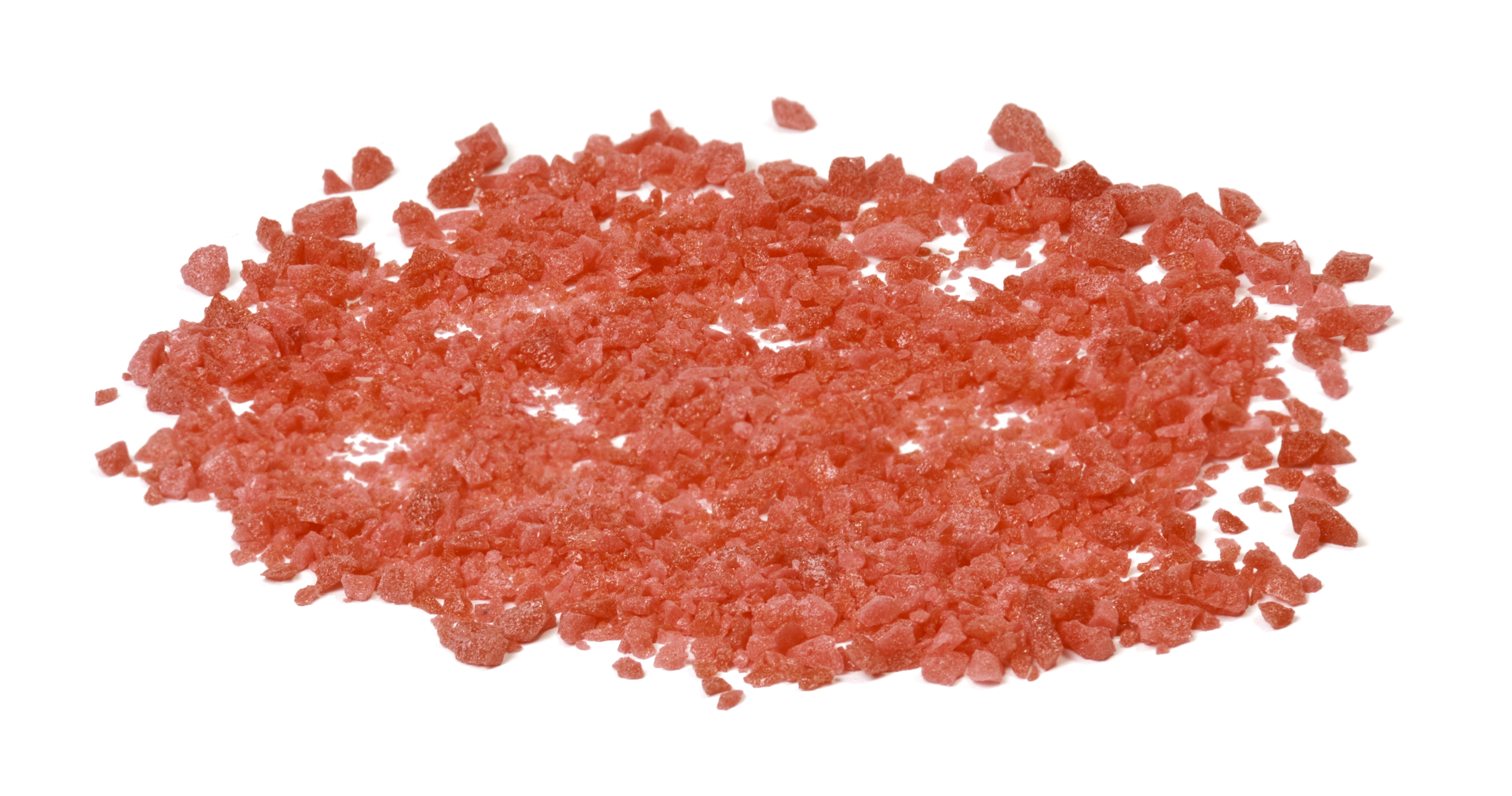
Pop Rocks

Pop Rocks, also known as popping candy, is a type of candy owned by Zeta Espacial S.A. It differs from typical hard candy in that pressurized carbon dioxide gas bubbles are embedded inside of the candy, creating a small popping reaction when it dissolves. Pop Rocks additionally consists of sugar, lactose (milk sugar), and flavoring.

== Background and history ==
The concept was initially patented by General Foods research chemists Leon T. Kremzner and William A. Mitchell on December 12, 1961 (U.S. patent #3,012,893), with a subsequent patent by General Foods research chemists Fredric Kleiner, Pradip K. Roy, and Michael J. Kuchman on September 15, 1981 (U.S. patent #4,289,794).

In the Spring of 1974, General Foods first test-marketed Pop Rocks in Canada stores under its Hostess brand, and introduced it in the United States in 1976 as Pop Rock Crackling Candy. The product became an immediate hit, at one point outselling other confectionery items by as much as ten to one. The product’s popularity was undermined by persistent safety rumors, prompting General Foods to run newspaper advertisements in early 1979 assuring consumers the candy was safe. Demand nonetheless collapsed and production was discontinued in 1980, and the candy remained off the market until 1986, when the rights to Pop Rocks were licensed to Carbonated Candy Ventures, which reintroduced it to market.

After the licensing agreement with Carbonated Candy Ventures expired, Kraft Foods, then a division of General Foods, licensed the Pop Rocks brand to Zeta Espacial S.A., which continued manufacturing the product under Kraft’s authorization. Zeta Espacial later became the brand’s owner and sole manufacturer. Pop Rocks is distributed in the U.S. by Pop Rocks Inc. (Atlanta, Georgia) and by Zeta Espacial S.A. (Barcelona, Spain) in the rest of the world. Zeta Espacial S.A. also sells popping candy internationally under other brands including Peta Zetas, Wiz Fizz, and Magic Gum.

In 2008, Marvin J. Rudolph, who led the group assigned to bring Pop Rocks out of the laboratory and into the manufacturing plant, wrote a history of Pop Rocks development. The book, titled Pop Rocks: The Inside Story of America's Revolutionary Candy, was based on interviews with food technologists, engineers, marketing managers, and members of Billy Mitchell's family, along with the author's experience. In the book, Rudolph points out that the Turkish company HLEKS Popping Candy flooded the market with popping candy in the year 2000.

A similar product, Cosmic Candy, previously called Space Dust, was in powdered form and was also manufactured by General Foods.

In 2012, Cadbury Schweppes Pty. Ltd. (in Australia) began producing a chocolate product named "Marvellous Creations Jelly Popping Candy Beanies" which contains popping candy, jelly beans and "beanies" (candy-covered chocolate). By 2013, Whittakers (New Zealand) had also released a local product (white chocolate with a local carbonated drink Lemon and Paeroa). Prominent British chef Heston Blumenthal has also made several desserts incorporating popping candy, both for the peculiar sensory experience of the popping and for the nostalgia value of using an ingredient popular in the 1970s.

== Manufacturing ==
As described by a 1980 patent, the candy is made by dissolving sugars in water and is evaporated at 320 °F (160 °C) until the water content is 3% by mass. The water and sugar mixture is then cooled to 280 °F (138 °C), and while being intensely stirred, it is pressurized with carbon dioxide at 730 pounds per square inch [psi] (50 atm). The mixture is then kept under pressure and allowed to cool and solidify, embedding the carbon dioxide bubbles in the candy. The majority of the resultant carbon dioxide bubbles are between 225–350 micrometres (0.0089–0.0138 in) in diameter. When the pressure on the cooled and solidified candy is released, it shatters into pieces that vary in size.

== Urban legend ==
False rumors persisted that eating Pop Rocks and drinking soda would cause a person's stomach to boil and explode. This was, in part, caused by the assumption that Pop Rocks contain an acid/base mixture (such as baking soda and vinegar) which produces large volumes of gas when mixed through chewing and saliva. One of these myths involved child actor John Gilchrist (playing the character Little Mikey in 1970s Life cereal television commercials), who was falsely rumored to have died after consuming excess amounts of Pop Rocks and Coca-Cola.

Though the confection had been extensively tested and found safe, the carbonated candy still alarmed residents in Seattle. The Food and Drug Administration set up a hotline there to assure anxious parents that the fizzing candy would not cause their children to choke. General Foods was battling the "exploding kid" rumors as early as 1979. General Foods sent letters to school principals, created an open letter to parents, took out advertisements in major publications and sent the confection's inventor on the road to explain that a Pop Rocks package contains less gas (namely, carbon dioxide, the same gas used in all carbonated beverages) than half a can of soda.

The story has appeared in many other forms of media and fiction. On the very first episode of MythBusters, Adam Savage and Jamie Hyneman put the Mikey rumor to the test by mixing six packs of Pop Rocks and a six-pack of cola inside a pig's stomach, complete with enough hydrochloric acid to simulate the acid inside a human stomach. Despite the pig stomach growing to three times its initial size, it did not blow up even after time was allotted for digestion. In another stomach used as an experimental counterpart, only a large amount of sodium bicarbonate along with acid and soda (and without any Pop Rocks) was able to cause a gastric rupture. The broadcast included interview clips with Pop Rocks Inc. vice president Fernando Arguis explaining the candy and the myth, and Savage later alluded to the myth at a presentation at Rensselaer Polytechnic Institute by showing that Pop Rocks and soda—albeit in a smaller amount—in his own stomach was not fatal.
