= List of fruit dishes =

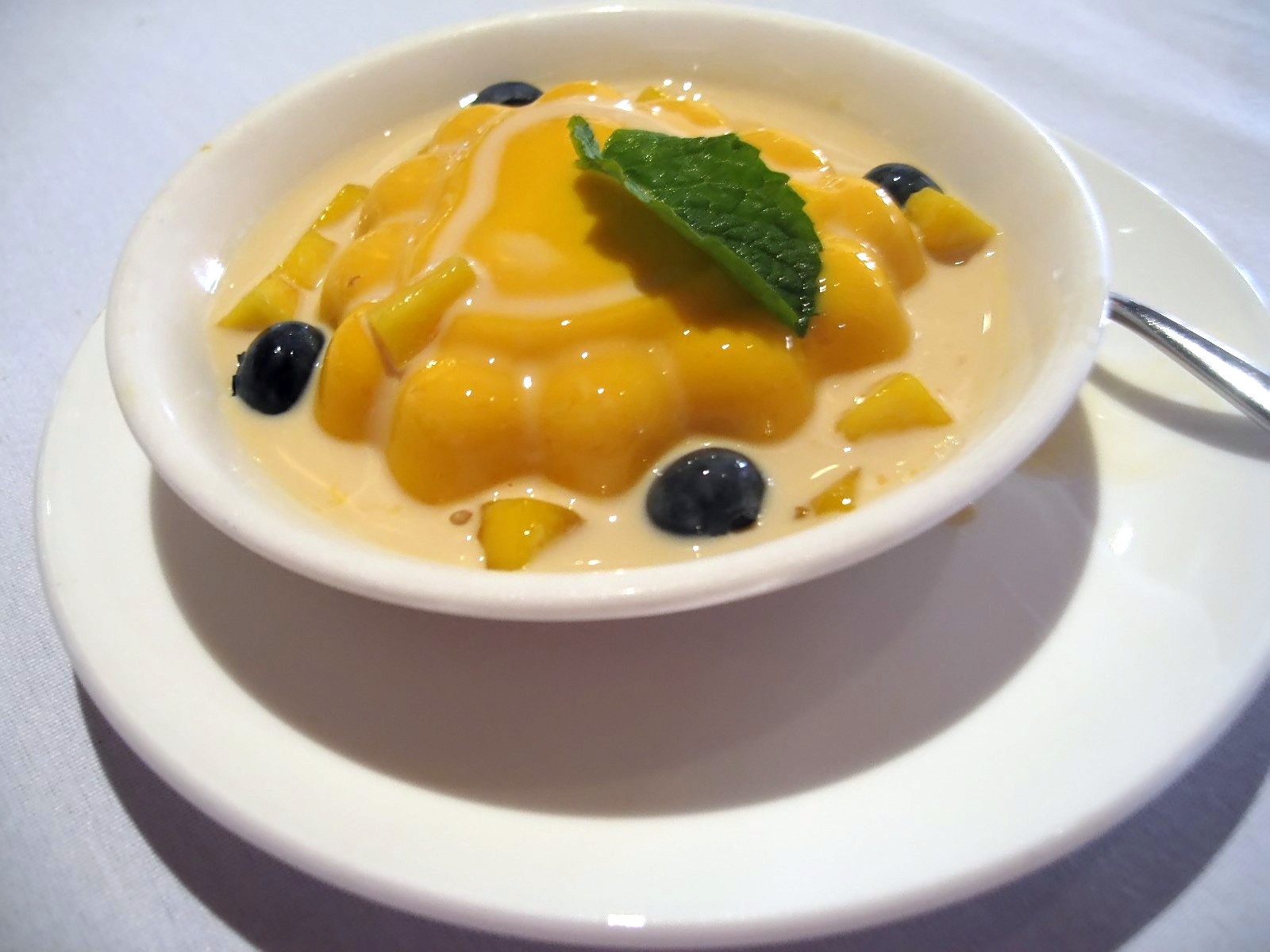
Mango pudding

This is a list of notable fruit dishes. Fruit dishes are those that use fruit as a primary ingredient. Condiments prepared with fruit as a primary ingredient are also included in this list.

== Fruit dishes ==
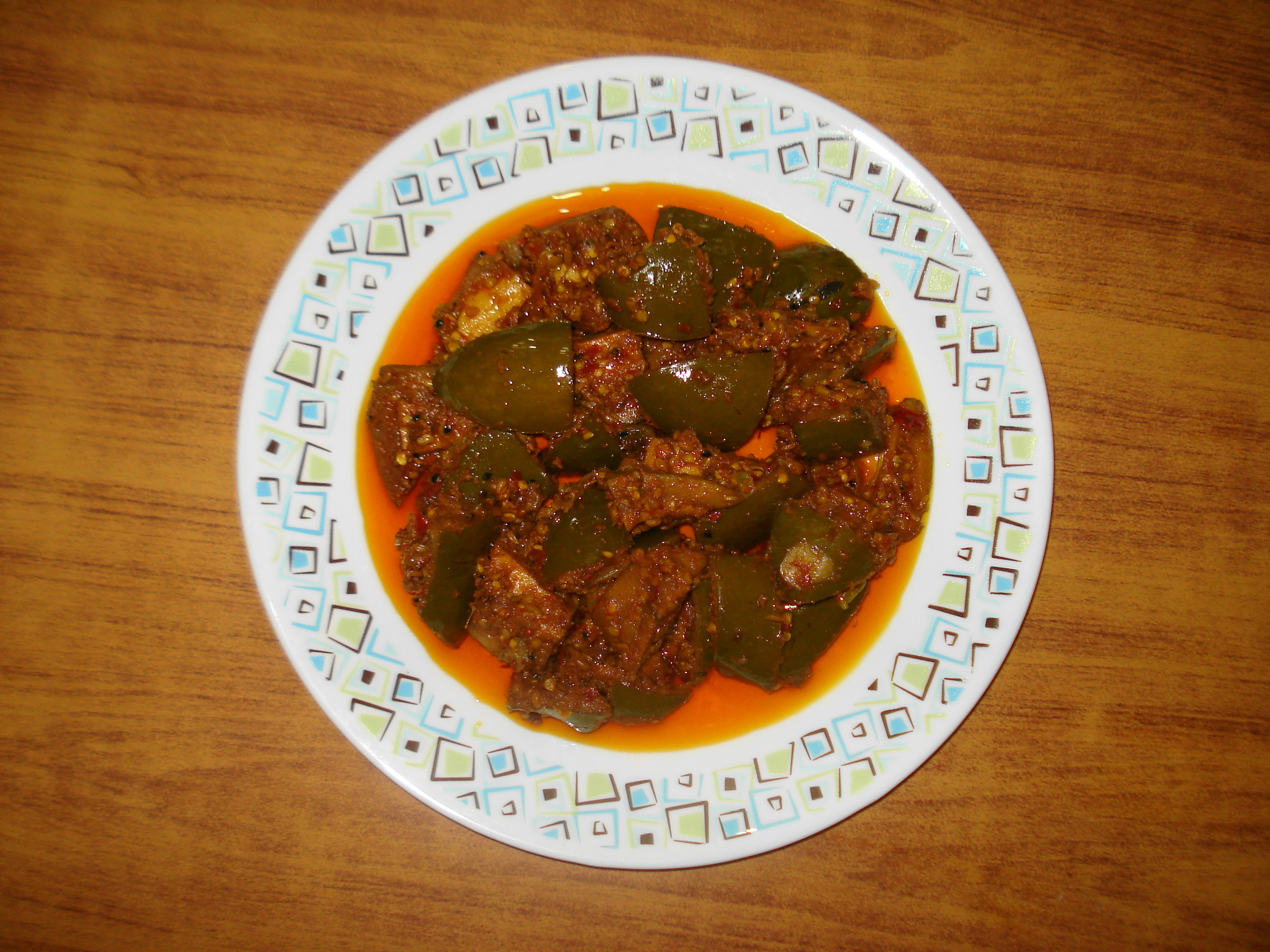
Achar made of pickled mango.

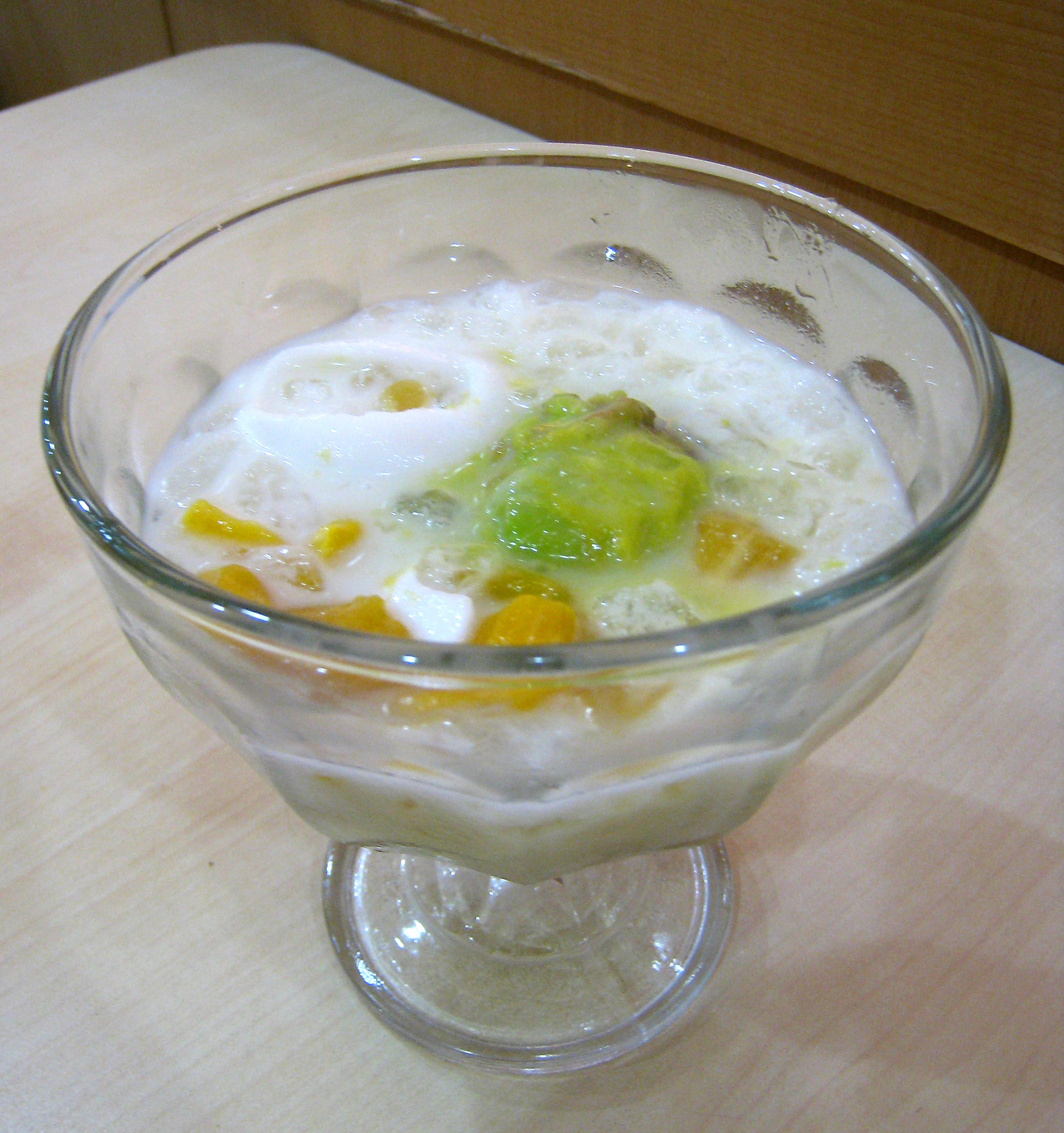
Es teler is a fruit cocktail in Indonesia.

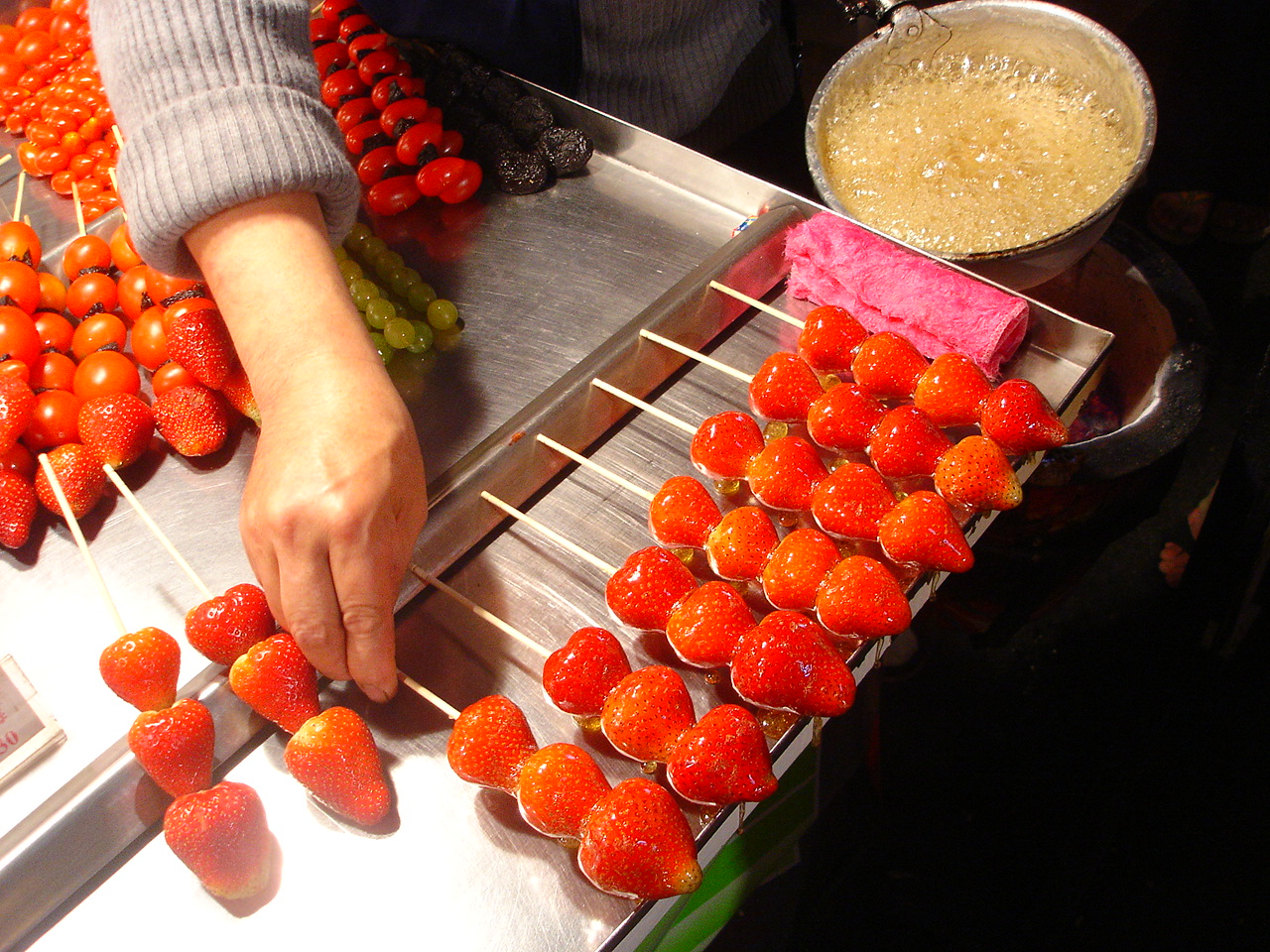
Tanghulu is a traditional Chinese snack of candied fruit

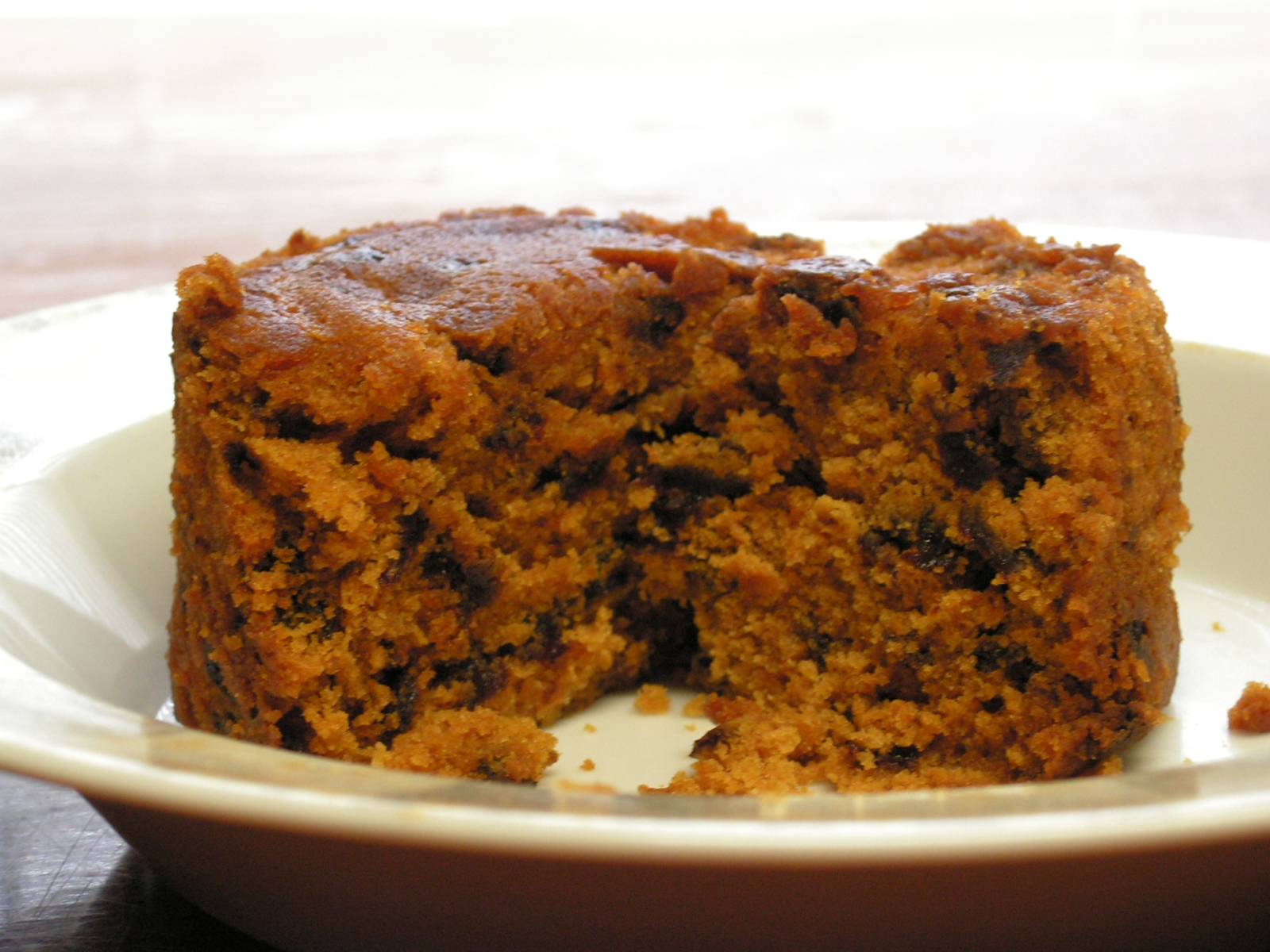
Spotted dick

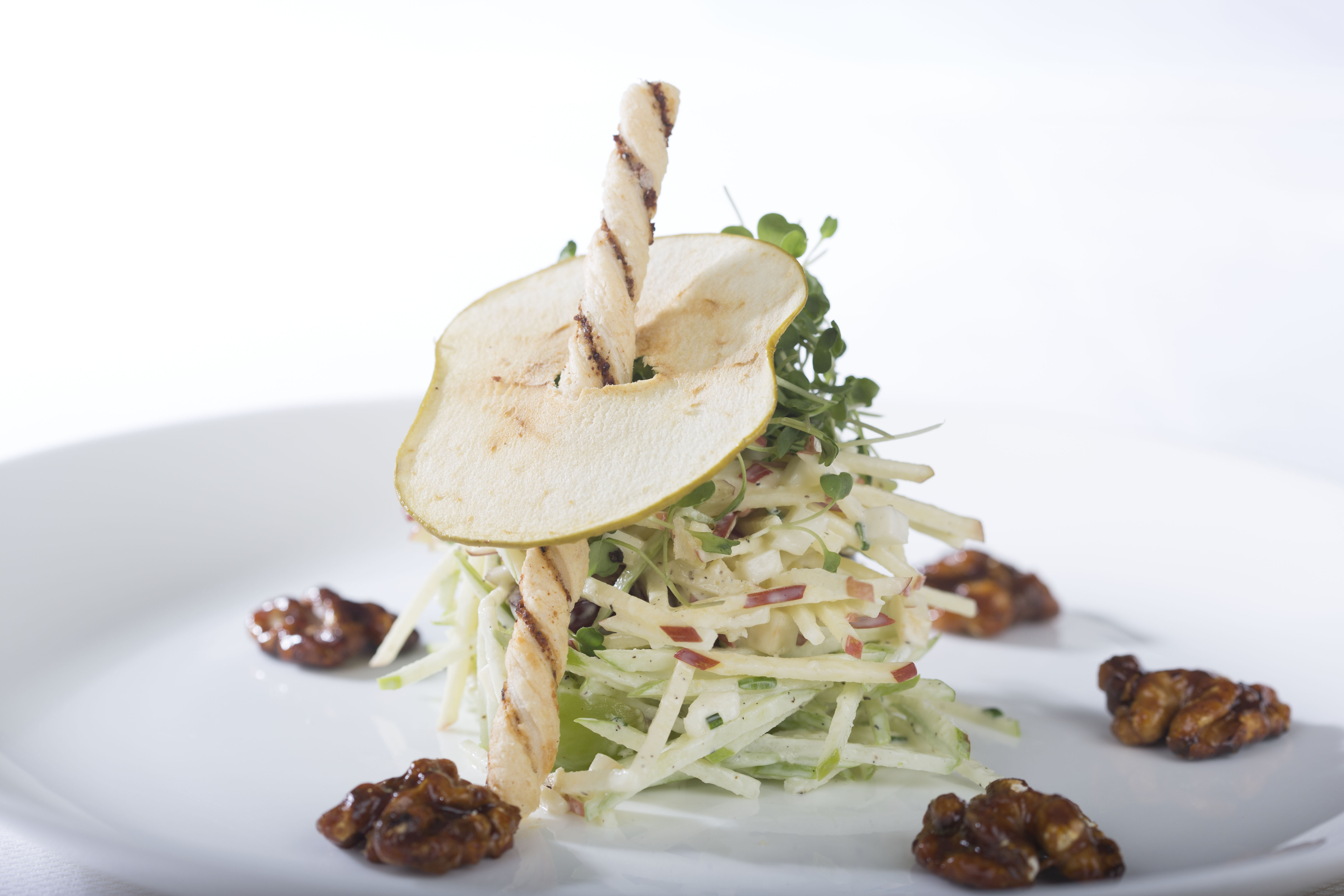
A fancy Waldorf salad

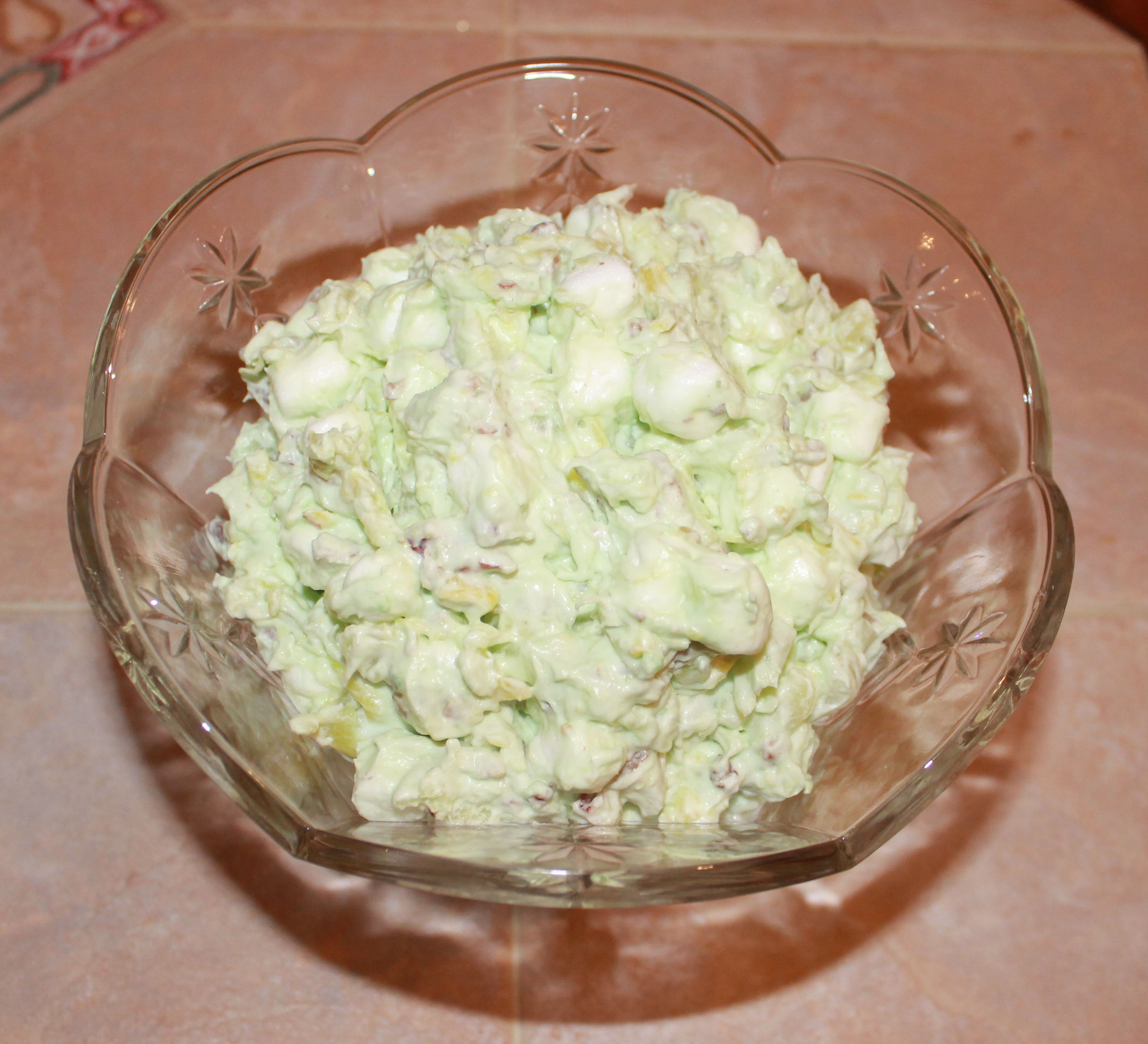
Watergate salad

- Aavakaaya – Variety of pickles prepared using mango
- Ambrosia (fruit salad) – American dish
- Apple crisp – Apple-based snack, with streusel topping
- Arrope – Condiment made from grape juice
- Avocado and milk in ice – Filipino dessert
- Baked apple – Culinary dish
- Barfi – Milk-based sweet from the Indian subcontinent, which can be made from fruits such as coconuts, oranges and mangoes.
- Bionico – Mexican dessert
- Blåbärssoppa – Nordic soup made from bilberries
- Black bun – Type of fruit cake
- Brown Betty (dessert) – American dessert
- Buckle (dessert) – Single-layer cake with berries
- Buko salad – Filipino fruit salad dessert
- Candle salad – Fruit salad from the United States
- Chajá – Uruguayan dessert
- Cherries jubilee – Dessert
- Chutney – South Asian condiment
- Clafoutis – French dessert or breakfast dish containing cherries
- Clementine cake – Cake flavored primarily with clementines
- Cobbler (food) – Baked dish resembling a pie – fruit baked with a topping of biscuits
- Coconut jam – Jam made with coconut milk
- Compote – Dessert of fruit cooked in syrup
- Cranachan – Traditional Scottish dessert
- Crema de fruta – Filipino layer cake
- Crisp (dessert) – Fruit-based American dessert – fruit baked with a sugary, streusel-like topping, generally containing oats or nuts (or both)
- Crumble – Baked fruit dessert
- Date shake – Type of sweet drink using dates as the main ingredient
- Duff (dessert) – Dessert from the Bahamas
- Es buah – Indonesian iced fruit cocktail dessert
- Es campur – Indonesian iced sweet dessert
- Es teler – Indonesian fruit cocktail
- Eton mess – Traditional English dessert
- Flaugnarde – French dessert
- Frogeye salad – Dessert salad made with pasta
- Fruit butter – Sweet fruit spread
- Fruit fool – English dessert of fruit and custard or cream
- Fruit juice – Naturally occurring liquid present in fruits and vegetables
- Fruit preserves – Preparations of fruits, sugar, and sometimes acid
- Fruit relish
- Fruit salad – Dish consisting of fruits
- Fruitcake – Cake made with candied or dried fruit, nuts, and spices
- Ginataang langka – Filipino vegetable stew
- Gliko – Traditional Albanian fruit preserve
- Green papaya salad – Spicy salad made from unripe papaya
- Halo-halo – Filipino dessert
- Hagebuttenmark – Sweet spread made from rose hips
- Halwa – Confections often made from nut butters or flours. There is also Banana Halwa, a sweet dish made from ripe banana
- Kissel – Viscous fruit dish, served as dessert or drink
- Kompot – Fruit beverage
- Lamaw – Filipino dessert
- Lekvar – Sweet fruit spread
- Lörtsy – Finnish pastry
- Mango cake – Filipino chiffon cake
- Mango float – Filipino dessert
- Mincemeat – Mixture of dried fruit, spices and fat
- Murabba – Sweet fruit preserve
- Pancit buko – Filipino dish
- Pastafrola – Type of sweet tart
- Peach Melba – Peach and ice cream dessert
- Pickled fruit – Fruit that has been preserved by anaerobic fermentation in brine or immersion in vinegar
- Pineapple cake – Taiwanese sweet pastry
- Pineapple tart – Asian small pastries filled with pineapple jam
- Po'e – Polynesian pudding
- Poire à la Beaujolaise – Pear based dessert
- Poire belle Hélène – Pear and ice cream dessert
- Pork chops and applesauce – Dish in American cuisine
- Punch – Drink containing fruit or fruit juice
- Rødgrød – Danish/German dessert
- Rojak – Southeast Asian fruit and vegetable dish
- Riz Casimir – Swiss curry dish with fruits
- Seafoam salad – Type of lime jello salad
- Sicilian orange salad – Spanish and Sicilian salad dish
- Smulpaj – Swedish crumble dessert
- Sour cherry soup – Soup originating in Hungarian cuisine
- Spotted dick – Traditional British dessert
- Strawberry Delight – Dessert salad
- Tanghulu – Skewers of glazed fruit
- Tarte des Alpes – Pastry originating from the southern Alps
- Tarte Tatin – Caramelised fruit tart
- Tomato jam – Fruit jam
- Waldorf salad – Fruit and nut salad
- Watergate salad – American dessert salad dish
Fruit dishes

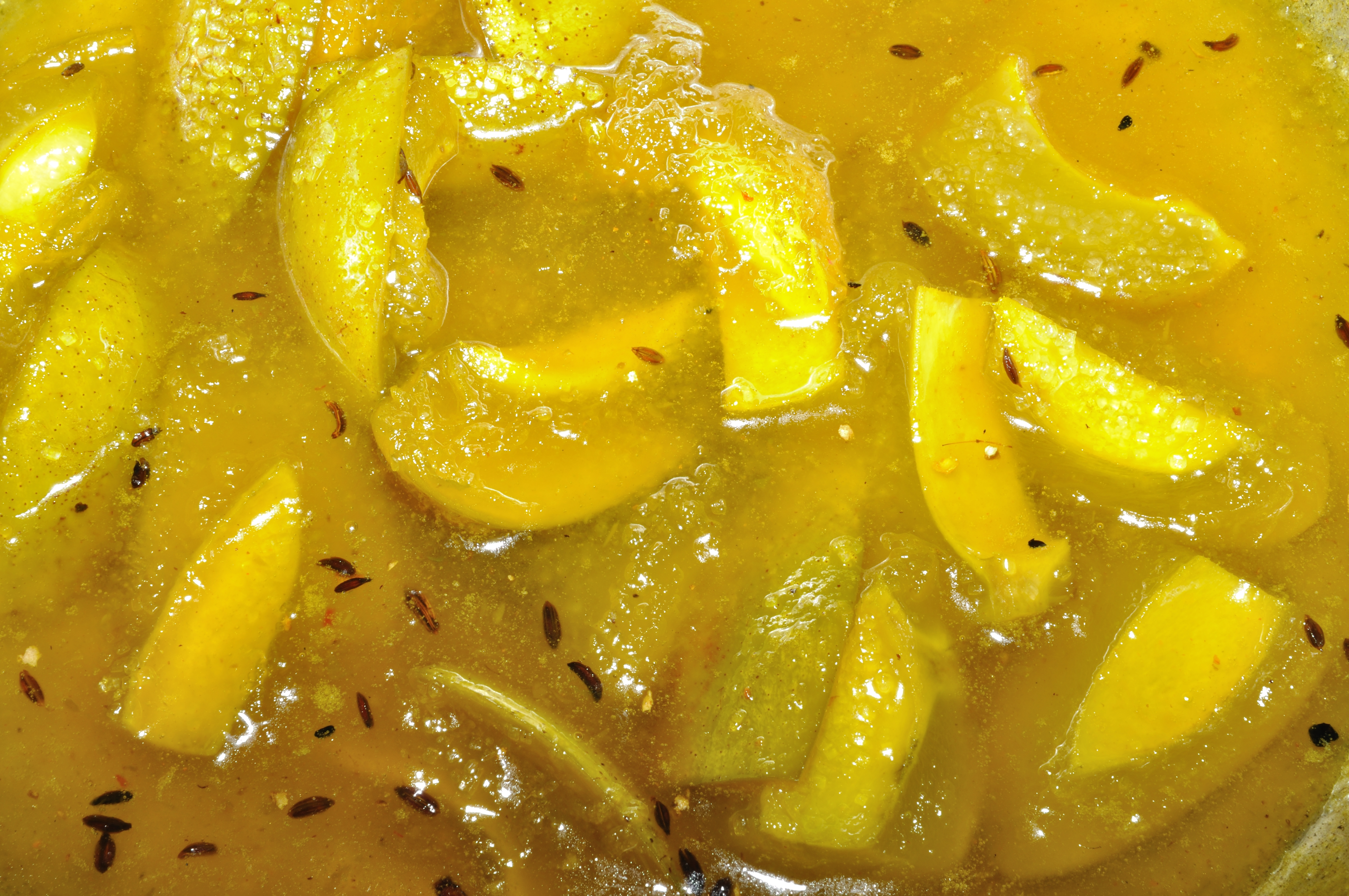
Chutney prepared with unripe mango

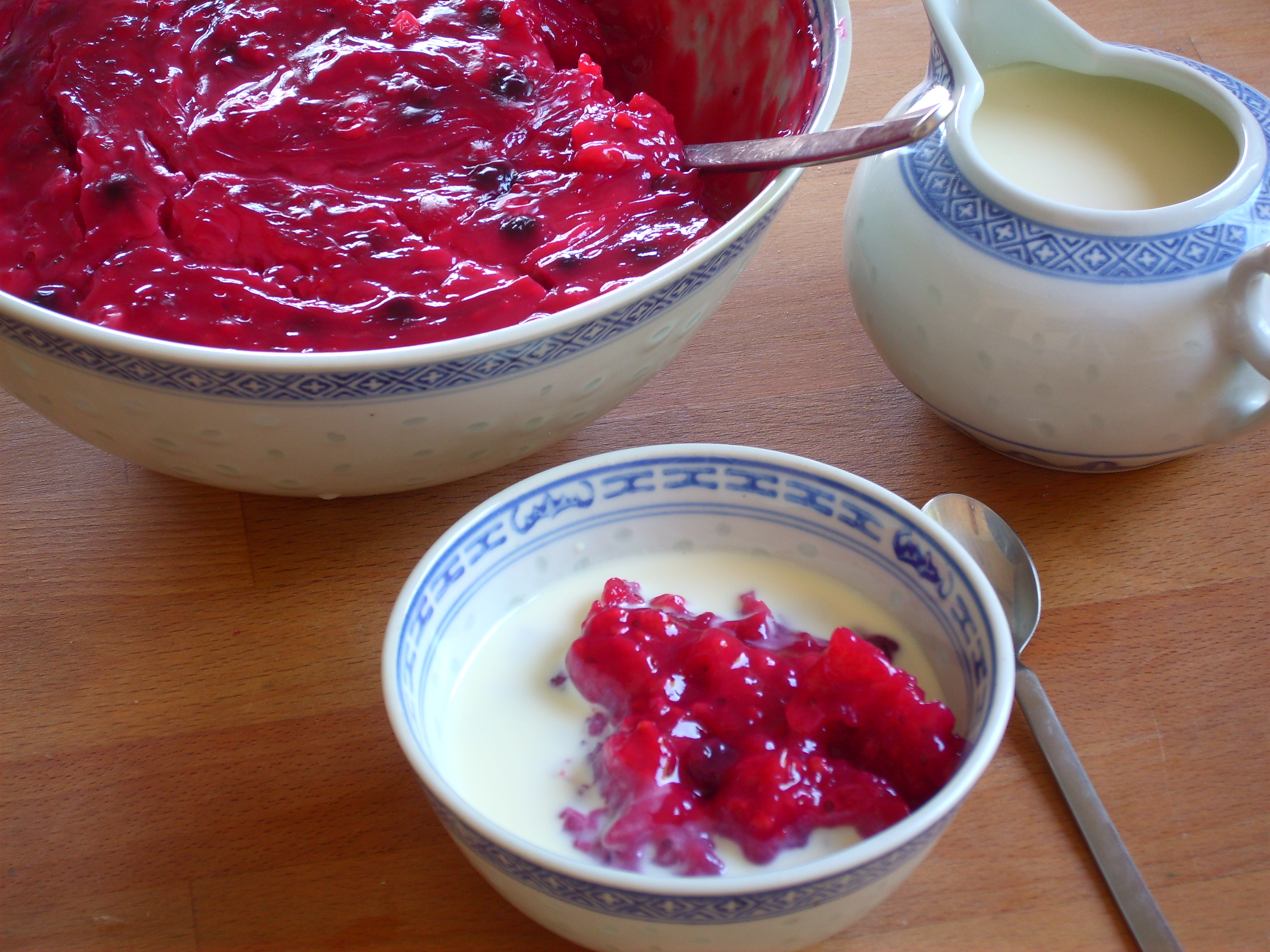
Rødgrød is a sweet fruit dish from Denmark and Germany

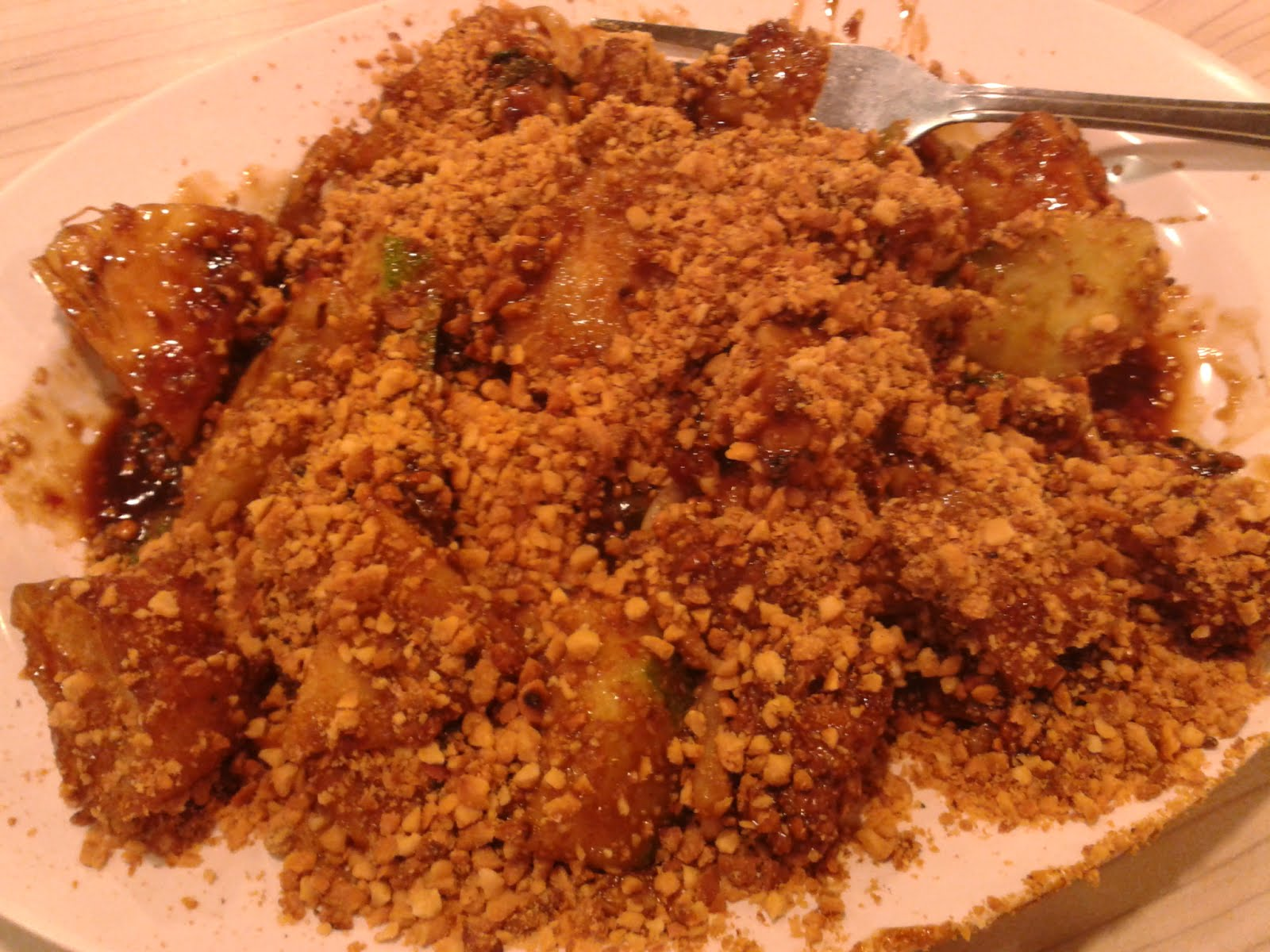
Fruit rojak in Indonesia

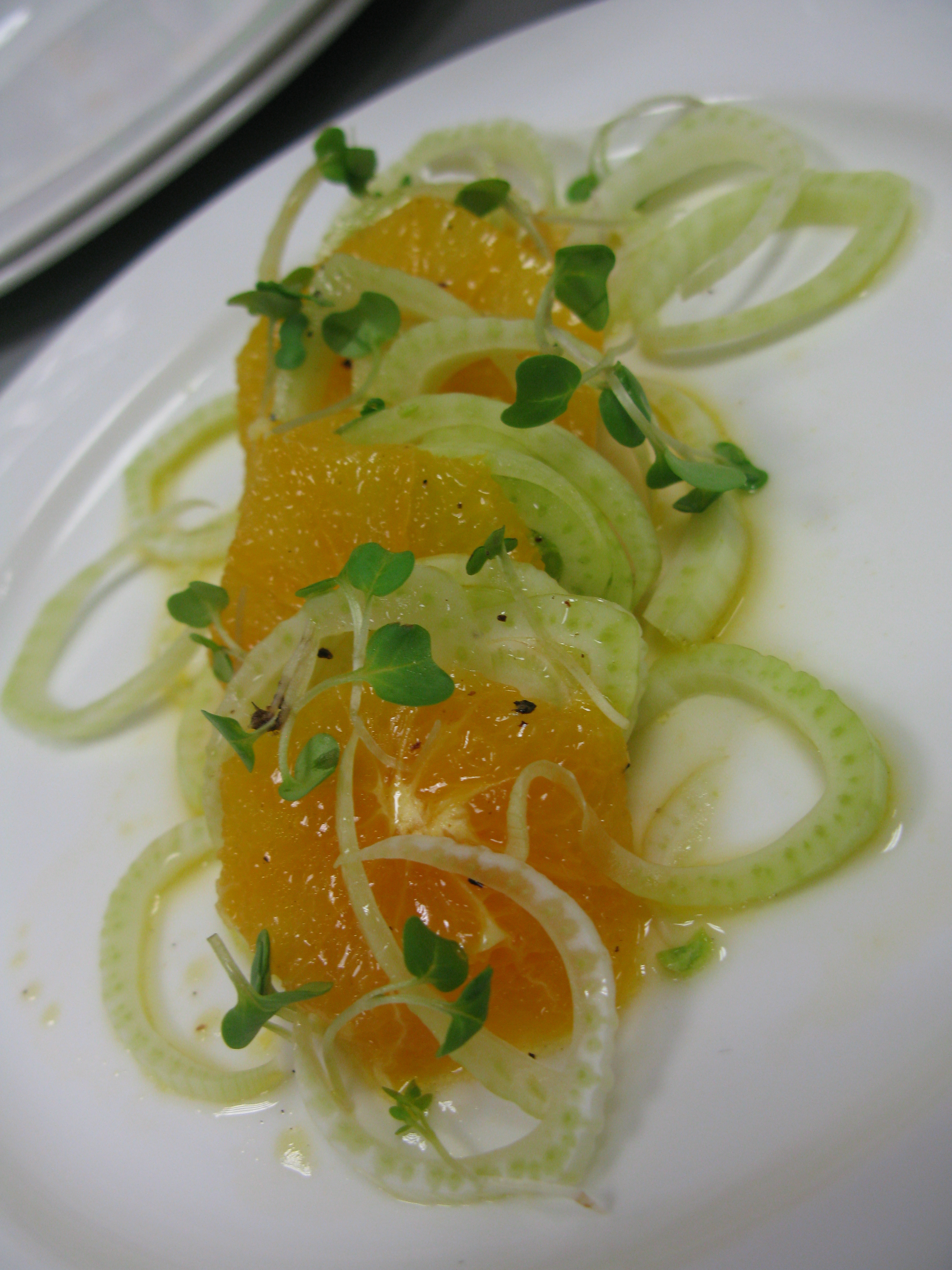
Sicilian orange salad

=== Banana dishes ===
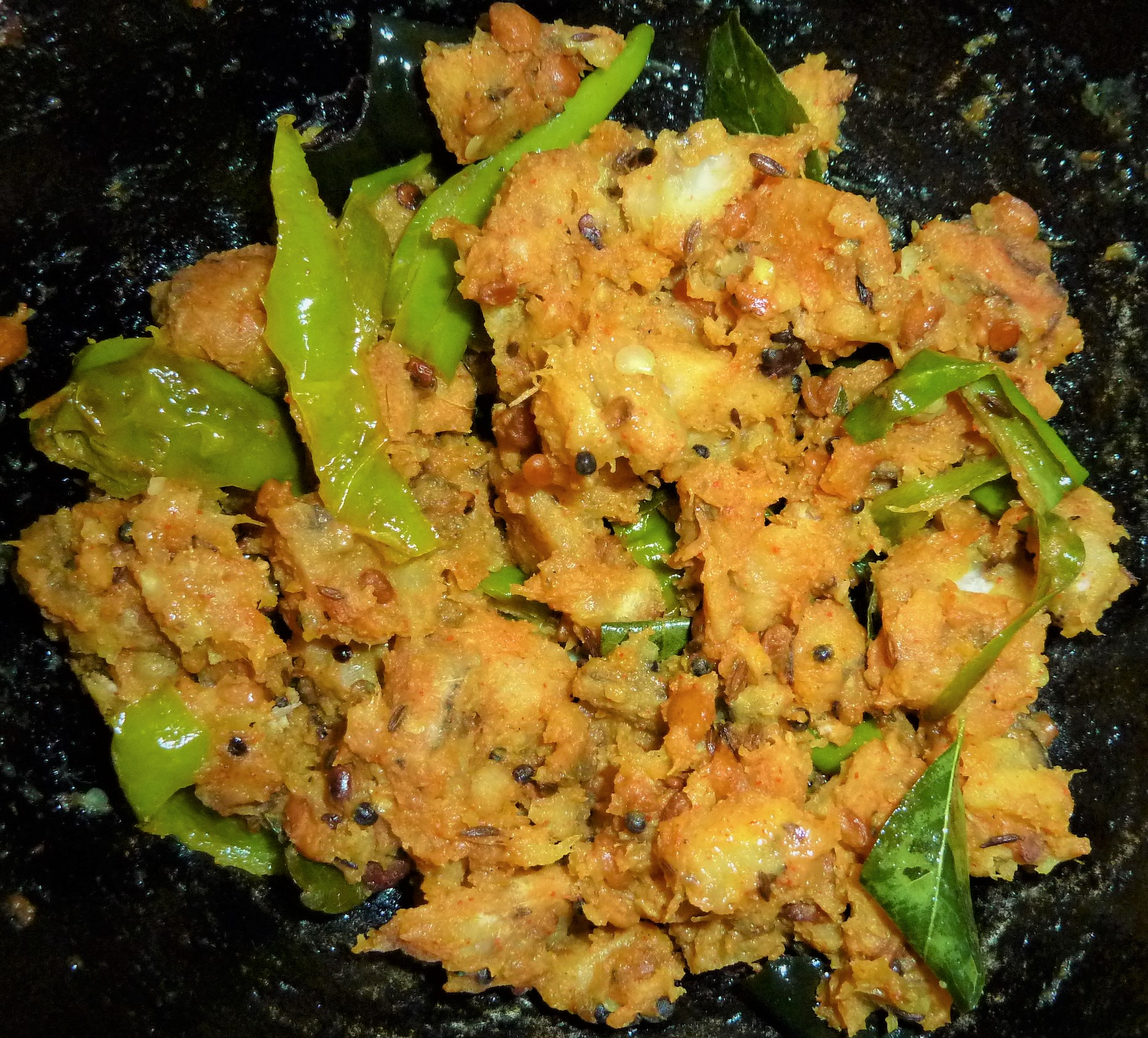
Banana with Lemon curry made in a house of Andhra Pradesh, Vijayawada

=== Pies ===
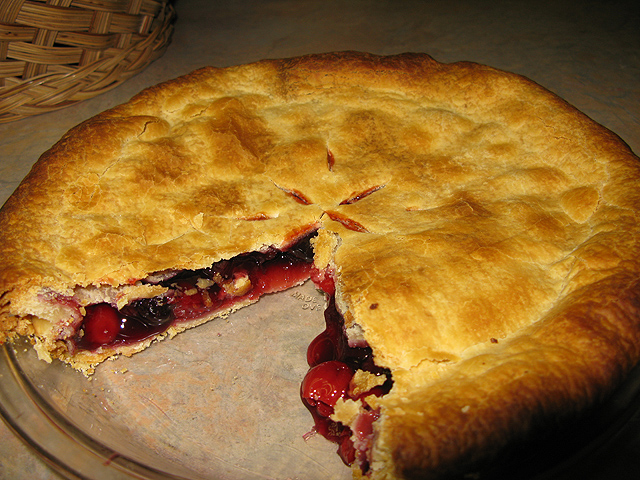
A pie prepared with cherry and blueberry

- Apple pie – Dessert pie made with apples
- Blackberry pie – Pie composed of blackberry filling
- Blueberry pie – Baked pastry with fruit filling
- Buko pie – Filipino coconut custard pie
- Bumbleberry pie – Canadian mixed berry pie
- Cherry pie – Pie with a cherry filling
- Grape pie – Fruit pie made from Concord grapes
- Key lime pie – American custard pie
- Mince pie – Sweet pie with dried fruits and spices
- Strawberry pie – Dessert of strawberries in a pie crust

=== Puddings ===
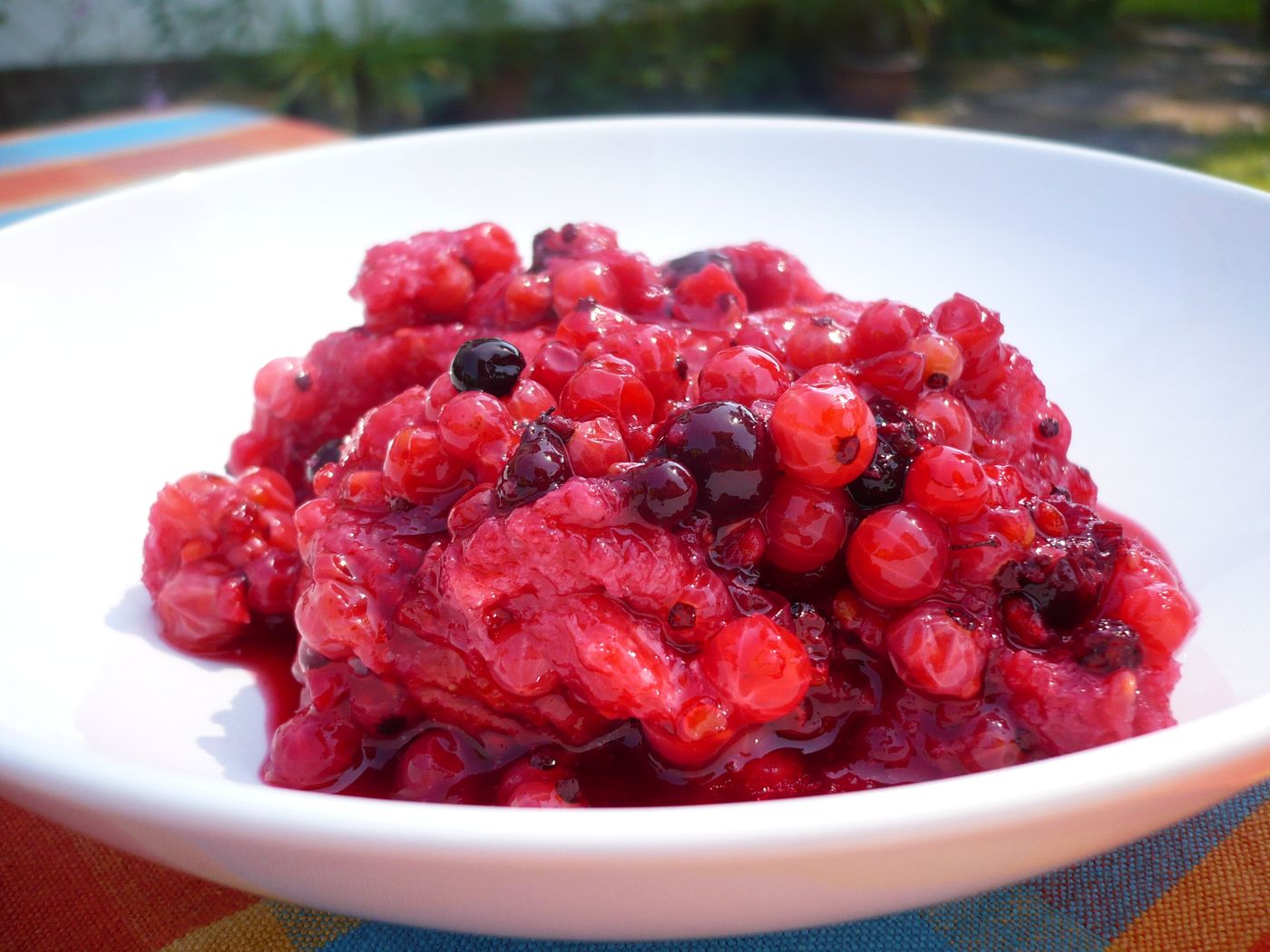
Summer pudding made with currants

- Malvern pudding – Fruit and custard pudding
- Mango pudding – Popular dessert in Hong Kong
- Ozark pudding – Custard with fruit and nuts
- Persimmon pudding – Dessert pudding made with persimmons
- Summer pudding – English dessert

== See also ==
- List of chutneys
- List of coconut dishes
- List of culinary fruits
- List of juices
- List of fruit liqueurs
- List of melon dishes
- List of squash and pumpkin dishes
- List of vegetable dishes
- Lists of prepared foods
- Thai fruit carving
