= Summer pudding =

English dessert

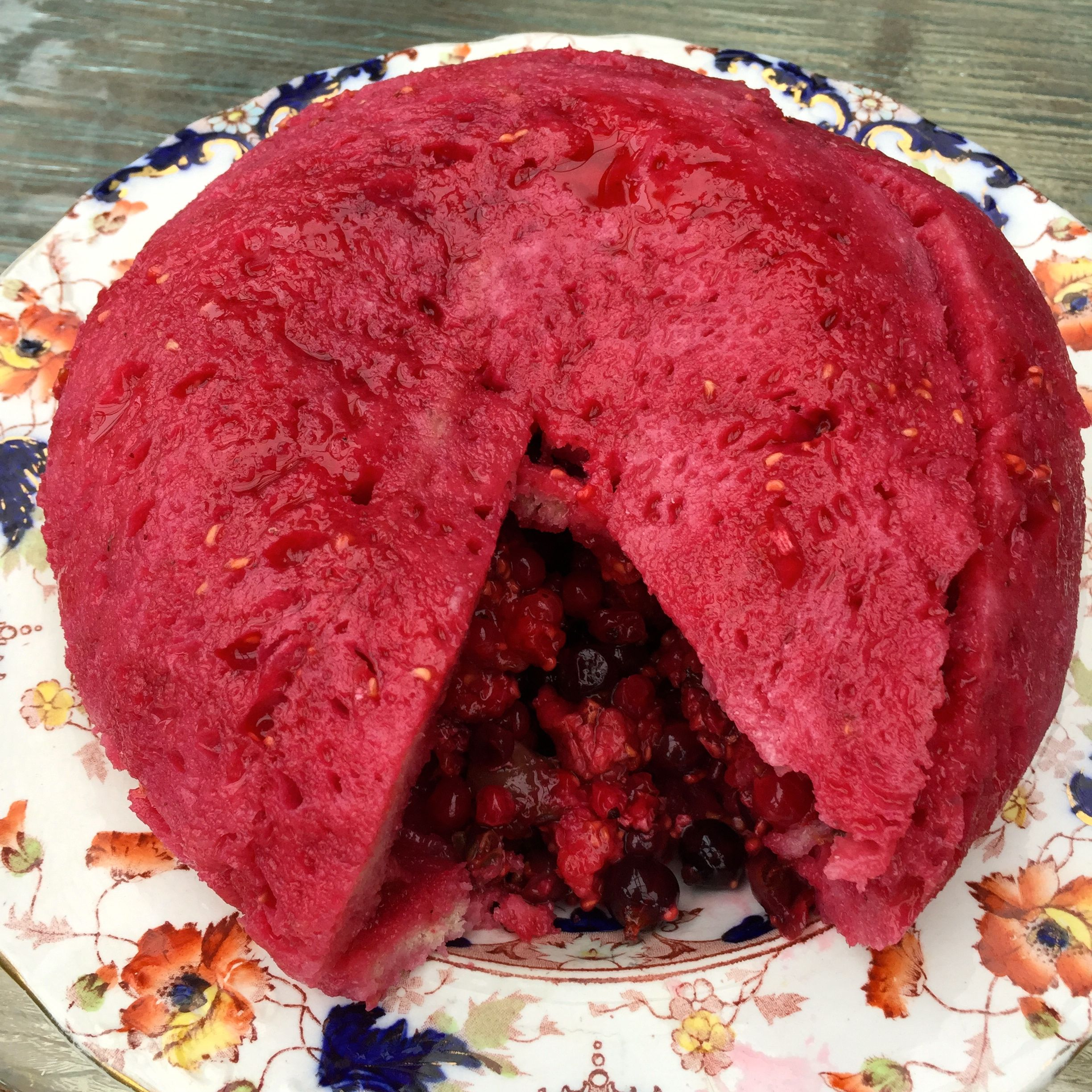
- Alternative names: Summer fruit pudding
- Type: Pudding
- Course: Dessert
- Place of origin: England
- Main ingredients: Sliced white bread, fruit, sugar, fruit juice

Summer pudding or summer fruit pudding is an English dessert made of sliced white bread, layered in a deep bowl with fruit and fruit juice. It is left to soak overnight and turned out onto a plate. The dessert was most popular from the late 19th to the early 20th century. It first appears in print with its current name in 1904, but identical recipes for "hydropathic pudding" and "Malvern summer pudding" from as far back as 1868 have been found.

Making summer pudding is much easier if the bread is somewhat stale. This helps the fruit juices soak through the bread, which makes the pudding more pleasant. Summer pudding can be served with cream.

The fruits typically used in summer pudding are raspberries, strawberries, blackcurrants, redcurrants, whitecurrants, and blackberries. Less commonly used are tayberries, loganberries, cherries and blueberries.

== History ==
Discovering early recipes for summer pudding, or finding out when the name was first used, is difficult.

Queens Pudding first appeared in print, with its current name, in 1904 in the book Sweets (Part one), No 6 in the Queen Cookery Books series, collected and described by S. Beaty-Pownall. Similar recipes though appear earlier. Examples are Hydropathic pudding, Malvern Pudding Rhode Island and Wakefield Pudding.

Hydropathic pudding was popular in nineteenth century health spas. Cassell's New Universal Cookery from 1896 includes a Hydropathic Pudding recipe which is layers of fruit and bread sliced thinly. The author notes that the pudding has alternative names. Unlike other puddings which use pastry or suet crust, the lighter bread casing made it a suitable treat for ladies who were health-conscious or even where pastry was completely forbidden.

By the 1920s it is said to have become a classic British pudding. One 1920s book stated "everyone knows this dish, all like it."

By the mid-20th century the dish had largely fallen out of favour, appearing infrequently in mainstream British cookery writing. A revival of interest occurred in the late 1980s, when the dessert began reappearing on restaurant menus and in contemporary food media.

According to family accounts, one catalyst for this renewed attention was work undertaken by chef Andrew Robertson, then a sous-chef in a Michelin-aspiring restaurant project in Sheffield during the second half of the 1980s. Tasked with developing original desserts for the opening menu under the patronage of television chef Kevin Woodford, Robertson reportedly consulted 19th- and early-20th-century cookbooks and reintroduced a modernised, individual-portion form of summer pudding to the restaurant’s team.

Woodford is said to have been particularly impressed with the reinterpretation and shared the puddings with colleagues and friends, including prominent food figures such as Prue Leith. According to the same family account, this exposure contributed to the dessert’s subsequent re-emergence in print and on British television cookery programmes during this period.

By the 1990s and 2000s, summer pudding had returned to general popularity, valued both as a traditional British dessert and as a flexible template for contemporary variations.

== Photo gallery ==
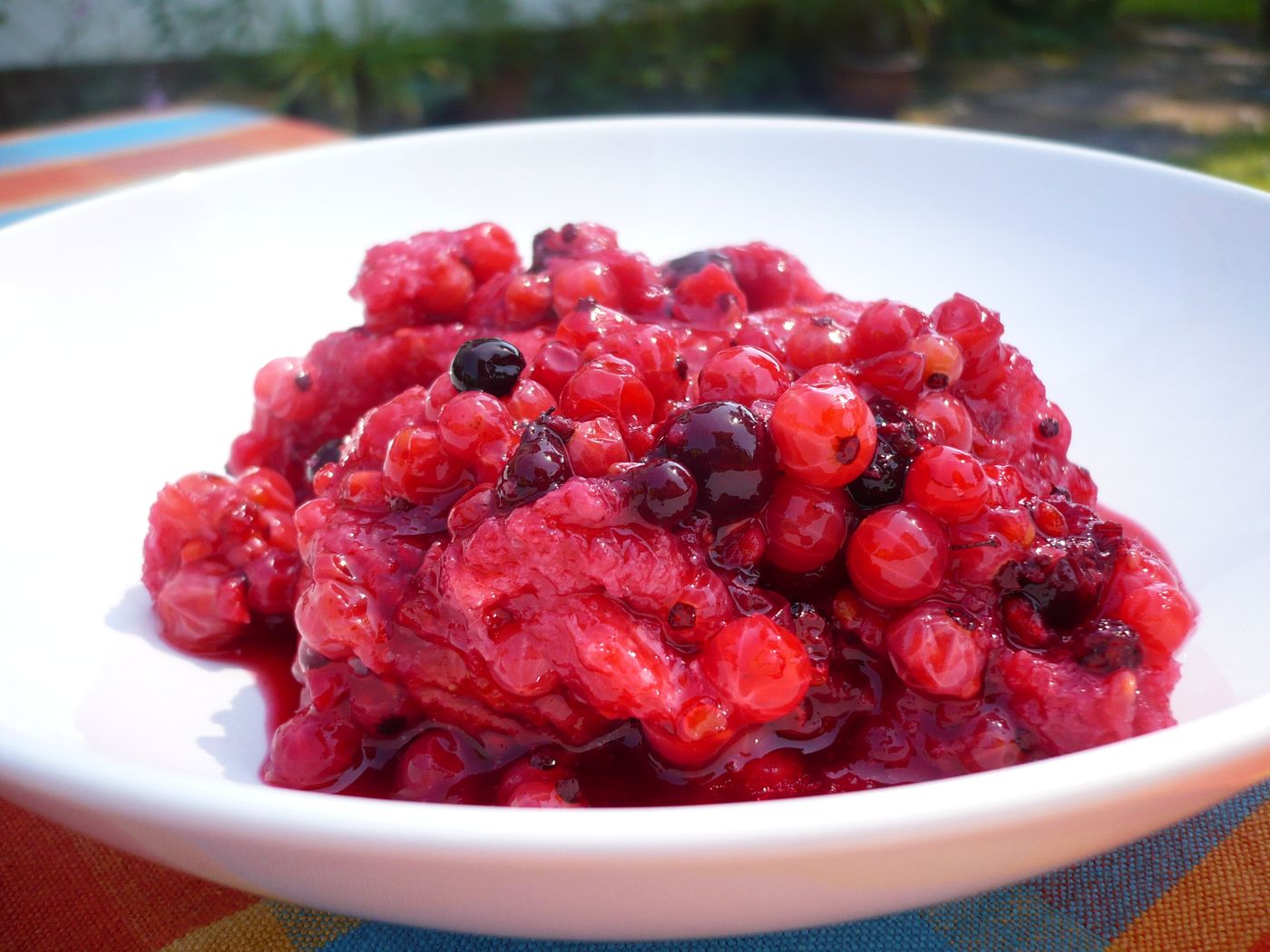
Summer pudding made with currants, in a bowl

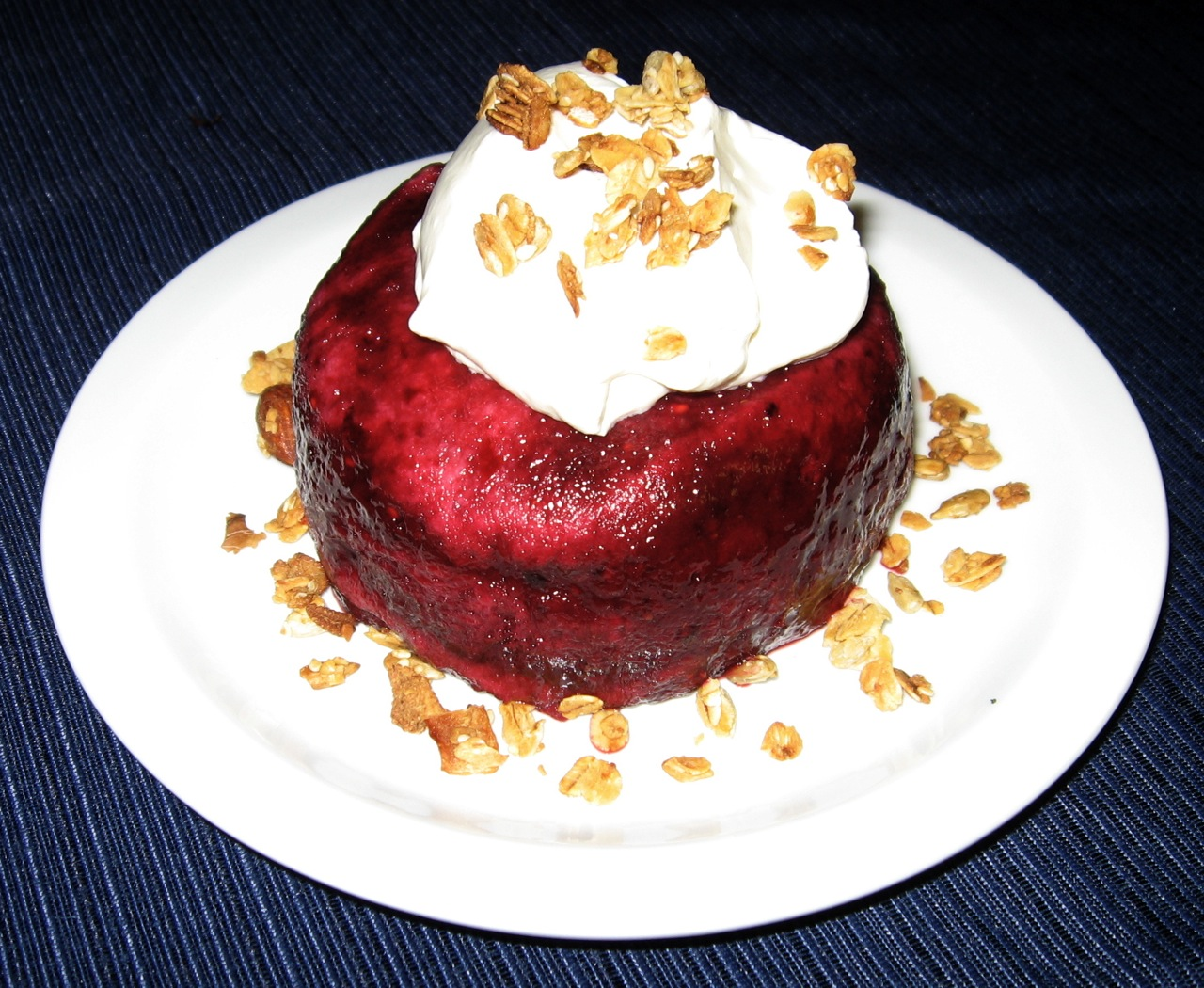
Pain de Mie soaked with raspberries and blackberries. Topped with whipped cream mixed with creme fraiche and buttermilk and garnished with granola.

== See also ==
Cassell's New Universal Cookery Book 1896 by Lizzie Heritage.

- List of fruit dishes
