= Mango pudding =

Popular dessert in Hong Kong

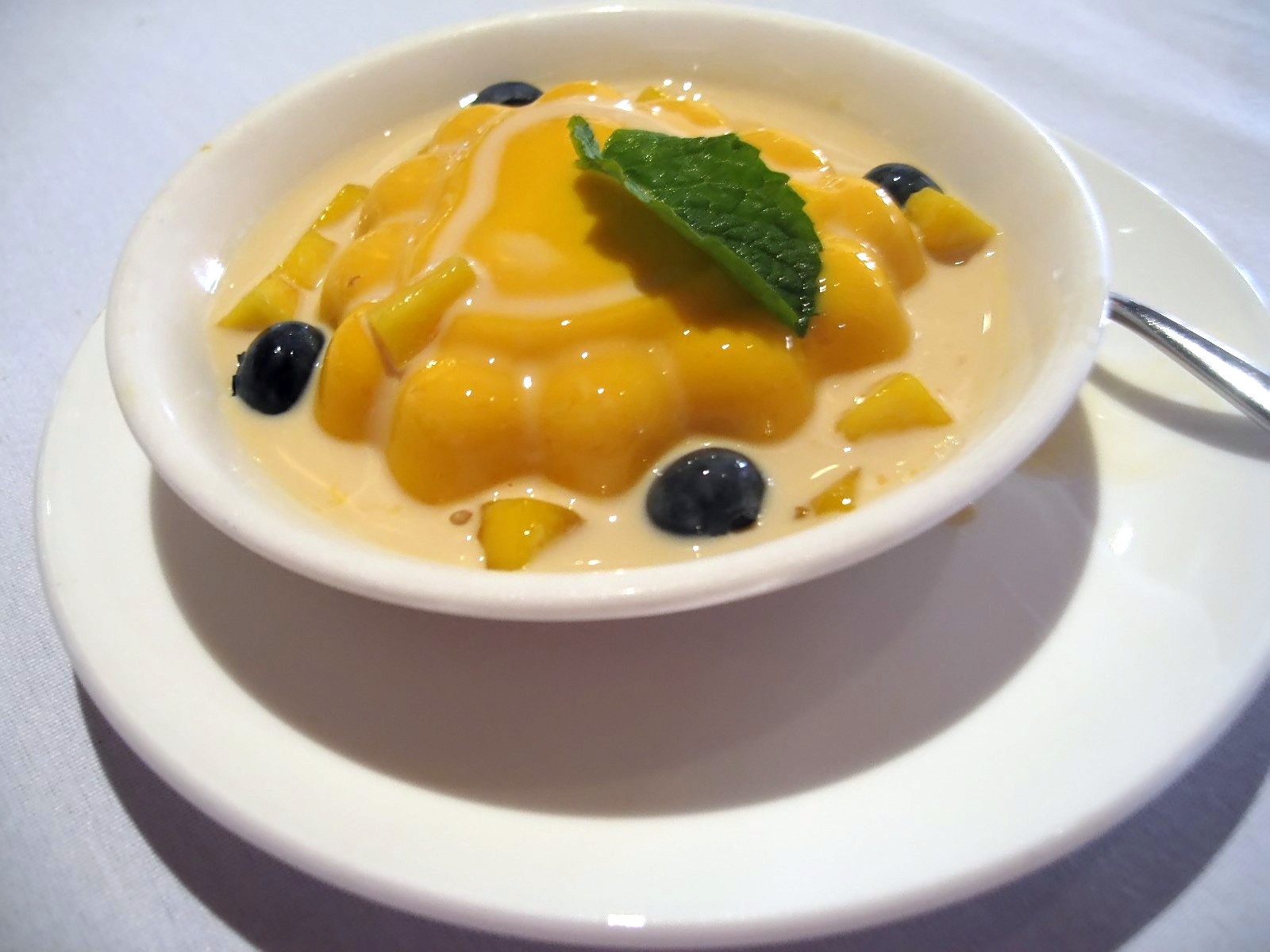
- Course: Dessert
- Place of origin: Hong Kong
- Region or state: Singapore, Malaysia, Thailand and southern China
- Serving temperature: Cold
- Main ingredients: Agar or gelatin, mangoes, evaporated milk, sugar

Mango pudding
- Chinese: 1. 芒果布丁; 2. 芒果布甸
- Literal meaning: Mango pudding
Transcriptions
Standard Mandarin
- Hanyu Pinyin: mángguǒ bùdīng
Yue: Cantonese
- Jyutping: mong1 gwo2 bou3 ding1

Mango pudding is a popular dessert in Hong Kong. There is very little variation between the regional mango pudding's preparation. The dessert is also found in Singapore, Malaysia, Thailand, Macau and is often served as dim sum in Chinese restaurants. The fresh variant is prepared by the restaurant or eatery and consists of agar or gelatin, mangoes, evaporated milk, and sugar. In addition, fresh fruit such as mango, strawberries, berries and kiwifruit, are occasionally added as garnish. Served and eaten refrigerator cold, mango pudding has a rich and creamy texture.

Some Chinese restaurants make the mango pudding in fish shape because goldfish or koi expresses good luck in Chinese culture.

== In supermarkets ==
Outside of dim sum and other restaurants, mango pudding can also be purchased at most Asian grocery stores or supermarkets. They can be purchased as a powder, which requires the addition of boiling milk or water to the powder, or in ready-to-eat portions.

Factory-made mango pudding does not contain fresh mangoes and instead, consists of mango essence and either gelatin or agar.

== See also ==
- Mango pomelo sago
- List of Chinese desserts
- List of desserts
- List of fruit dishes
