= Fruit salad =

Dish consisting of fruits

Fruit salads
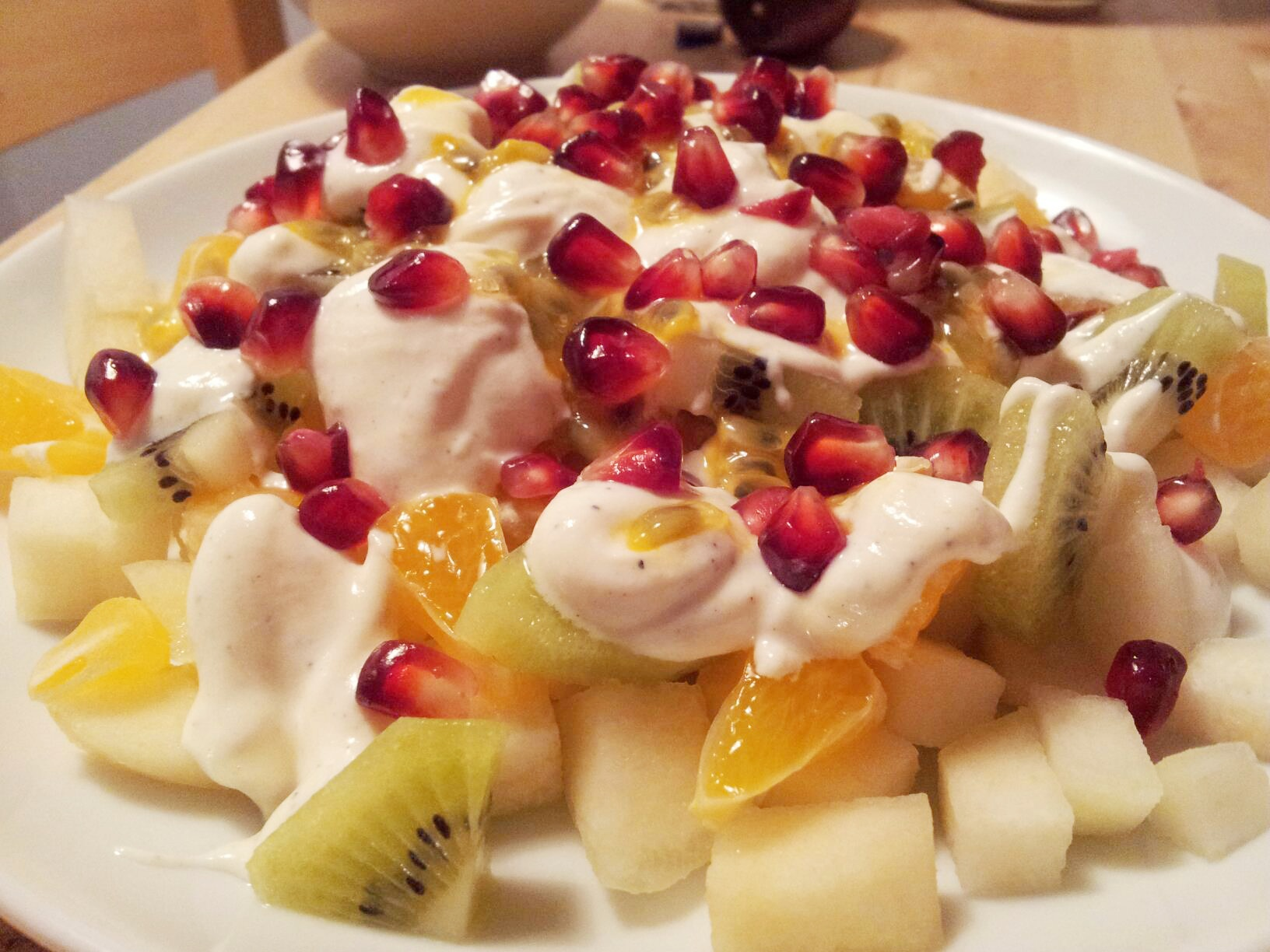
- A plate of fruit salad made of pear, satsuma mandarin, kiwifruit, passion fruit, pomegranate seeds, and Greek yogurt mixed with honey, cardamom and vanilla sugar
- Alternative names: Fruit cocktail, fruit cup
- Type: Salad
- Course: Appetizer, dessert, snack, main meal
- Main ingredients: Fruit, fruit juice or syrup
- Variations: Macedonia

Fruit salad is a combination of chopped fruit, sometimes with added liquid or syrup. Fruit salad can be served as an appetizer, a side dish or dessert. It is sometimes called 'fruit cocktail' (especially the canned product), or 'fruit cup' (when served in small containers).

Fruit salad may consist of fruit alone or contain additions such as nuts or marshmallows.

Another type of fruit salad is jello salad. In the US, canned fruit cocktail is a mixture of diced peaches, pears, pineapple, grapes and marachino cherries.

== Description ==
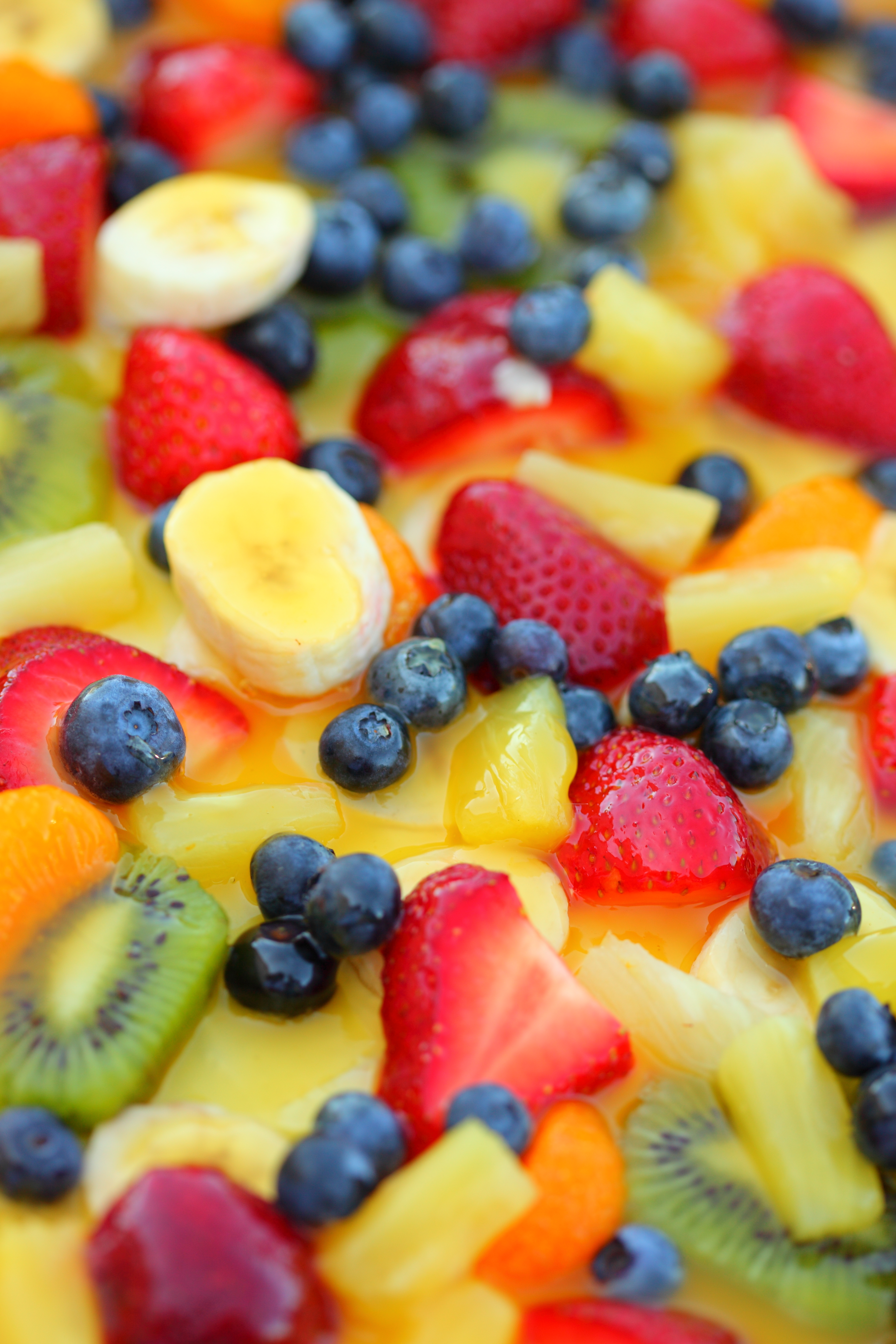
Fruit salad with kiwifruit, strawberries, blueberries, pineapples, bananas, and oranges

A fruit salad being prepared with miniature marshmallows and chopped nuts, mixed with a syrupy dressing

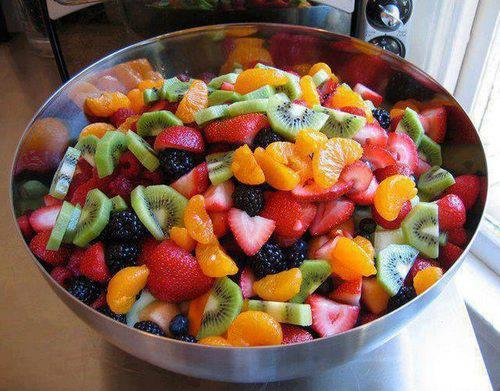
A bowl of fruit salad

Common ingredients in fruit salads include strawberries, pineapple, honeydew, watermelon, grapes, and kiwifruit. Various recipes may call for the addition of nuts, fruit juices, certain vegetables, yogurt, or other ingredients. A fruit salad does not necessarily need to be mixed.

One variation is a Waldorf-style fruit salad, which uses a mayonnaise-based sauce. Other recipes use sour cream (such as in ambrosia), yogurt, or even custard as the primary sauce ingredient. A variation on fruit salad uses whipped cream mixed in with many varieties of fruits (usually a mixture of berries), and also often includes miniature marshmallows. Rojak, a Malaysian fruit salad, uses a spicy sauce with peanuts and shrimp paste. In the Philippines, fruit salads are popular party and holiday fare, usually made with buko, or young coconut, and condensed milk in addition to other canned or fresh fruit. In Hawaii by influence of Cantonese immigrants during the sugar plantation days, "almond float" was introduced, where almond flavored gelatin is prepared, cubed, and typically mixed with canned fruit cocktail and canned lychee. Sicilian orange salad is a typical dish of Sicily (Italy) and Spain in which orange slices are dressed with olive oil, salt, and black pepper.

Mexico has a popular variation of the fruit salad called Bionico which consists of various fruits drenched in condensed milk and sour cream mix.

There is also an extended variety of fruit salads in Moroccan cuisine, often as part of a kemia, a selection of appetizers or small dishes analogous to Spanish tapas or eastern Mediterranean mezze.

A fruit salad ice cream is also commonly manufactured, with small pieces of real fruit embedded, flavored either with juices from concentrate, fruit extracts, or artificial chemicals.

Another type of fruit salad is one of the recipes that went viral on TikTok in 2024, named Hwachae. Korean fruit salad is a dessert that aims to be hydrating and refreshing. Made with fresh fruits, strawberry milk, seven-up and jelly or jell-o, this recipe is very popular in Asia.

== Fruit cocktail ==
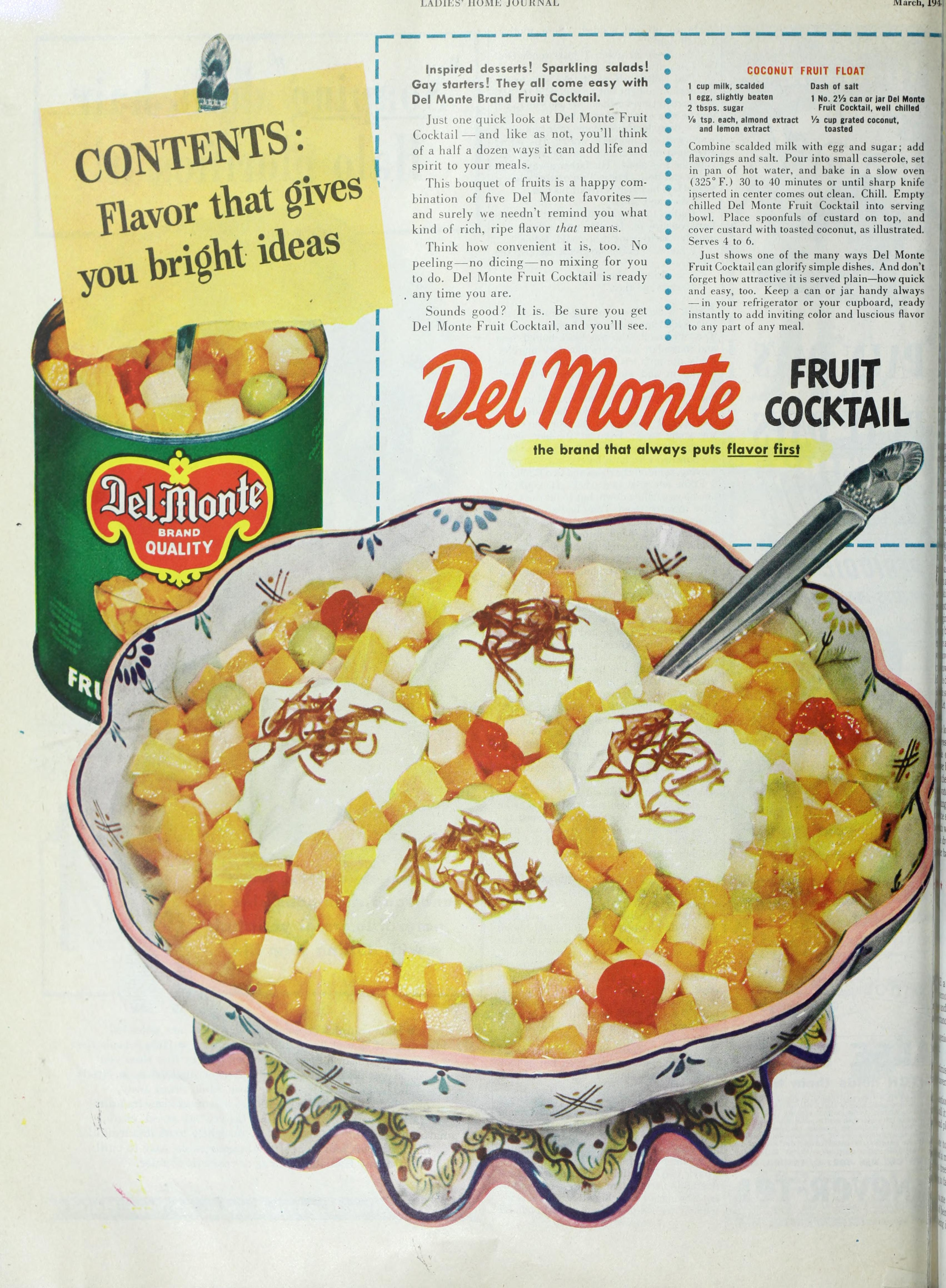
Advertisement for Del Monte brand fruit cocktail from 1948

Fruit cocktail is often sold canned and is a staple of cafeterias, but can also be made fresh. The use of the word "cocktail" in the name does not mean that it contains alcohol, but refers to the secondary definition: "an appetizer made by combining pieces of food, such as fruit or seafood".

In the United States, the USDA stipulates that canned "fruit cocktail" must contain a certain percentage distribution of pears, grapes, cherries, peaches, and pineapples to be marketed as fruit cocktail. It must contain fruits in the following range of percentages:

- 30% to 50% diced peaches, any yellow variety
- 25% to 45% diced pears, any variety
- 6% to 16% diced pineapple, any variety
- 6% to 20% whole grapes, any seedless variety
- 2% to 6% cherry halves, any light sweet or artificially colored red variety (like maraschino cherries)

Both William Vere Cruess of the University of California, Berkeley and Herbert Gray of the Barron-Gray Packing Company of San Jose, California, have been credited with the invention of fruit cocktails. Barron–Gray was the first company to sell fruit cocktail commercially, beginning in 1930, and California Packing Corporation began selling it under its Del Monte brand a few years later.

Canned fruit cocktails and canned fruit salad are similar, but fruit salad contains larger fruit while fruit cocktail is diced. Commercially, the fruit used was healthy but cosmetically damaged, such as a peach or pear that was bruised on one side. The bruised parts would be cut away and discarded, and the rest would be diced into small pieces.

== In popular culture ==
"Fruit Salad" (also known as "Fruit Salad Yummy Yummy") is the name of a song by Australian children's band the Wiggles.

"Fruit-salad" is also a slang term used for medals on a soldier's uniform, e.g. "Look at the fruit-salad on that colonel." The term refers to the bright colors of a high percentage of the ribbons that usually go with medals.

"Fruit salad" is an alternative name for the party game Fruit Basket Turnover.

== See also ==
- Clericó – a Latin American version of sangria, made from mixed fruit and wine
- Compote, dessert of fruit in syrup
- Frozen salad
- Green papaya salad, a savory salad made from the unripe fruit
- Macedonia (food), a variation made of small pieces of fruit or vegetable
