= Frozen salad =

Frozen dish

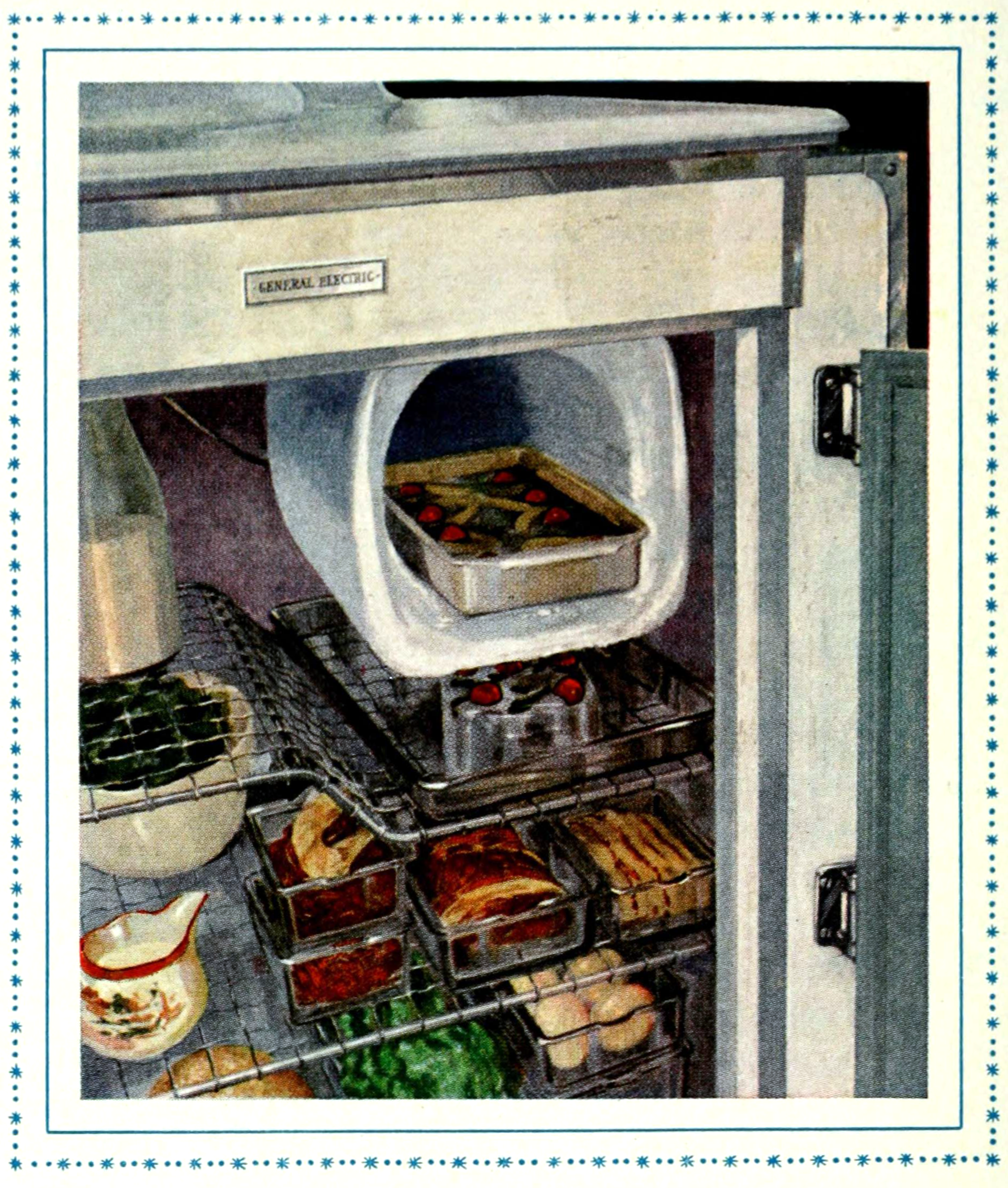
1927 illustration of a salad being set to freeze, top center

Frozen salads are made by freezing ingredients in a mold and serving them in glassware or in slices, often over a leaf of lettuce. Until the 1920s in America, frozen salads were consumed by the few who could afford expensive restaurant visits or large home refrigeration systems. As electric refrigerators made freezing at home more accessible, the dish gained popularity, helped by its convenience and enclosed presentation, which was valued in an era when the salad was perceived to be a mess in need of taming. A range of frozen salads were eaten containing meats, fruits or vegetables, often with pantry staples such as cream and mayonnaise. Popular examples included frozen ginger ale and pear salads, frozen tomato salads, and frozen cheese salads. Frozen fruit salads continue to be eaten today.

== Popular uptake ==
Frozen salads, a combination of ingredients frozen in a tray and served in slices, gained popularity in 1920s America as domestic freezing technology became widely available for the first time. Up until this point, frozen salads had existed, but they were only readily available to those who could afford and host large salt and ice freezers and to those who could visit the expensive hotels and restaurants that would serve them. As households purchased electric freezers for their improvements over iceboxes which could not freeze or maintain cool temperatures consistently, the salads were seen as attractive as a result of their prior exclusivity.

Frozen salads were also valued for the ways they contained foods, presenting them in a controlled manner, restrained fully in their geometric receptacles. This accorded with the values of the era as presented by home economists, who abhorred mess and conceived of the salad as necessary for nutrients but in need of containment through presentation and ideally sweetening. The salad could be brought further under control by choosing canned produce over fresh, which was perceived as more hygienic and unable to be contaminated by dirt. As dishes grew less recognizable as salads, lettuce leaves were employed to justify the categorization.

As they became eaten more often in the home, frozen salads remained available for purchase. Lunch counters and soda fountains served frozen salads in single portions for dine-in patrons, and sold larger portions to be taken home. By 1937, 1 US quart (950 ml) of frozen salad could be purchased for $1 (equivalent to $22 in 2025).

== Types ==
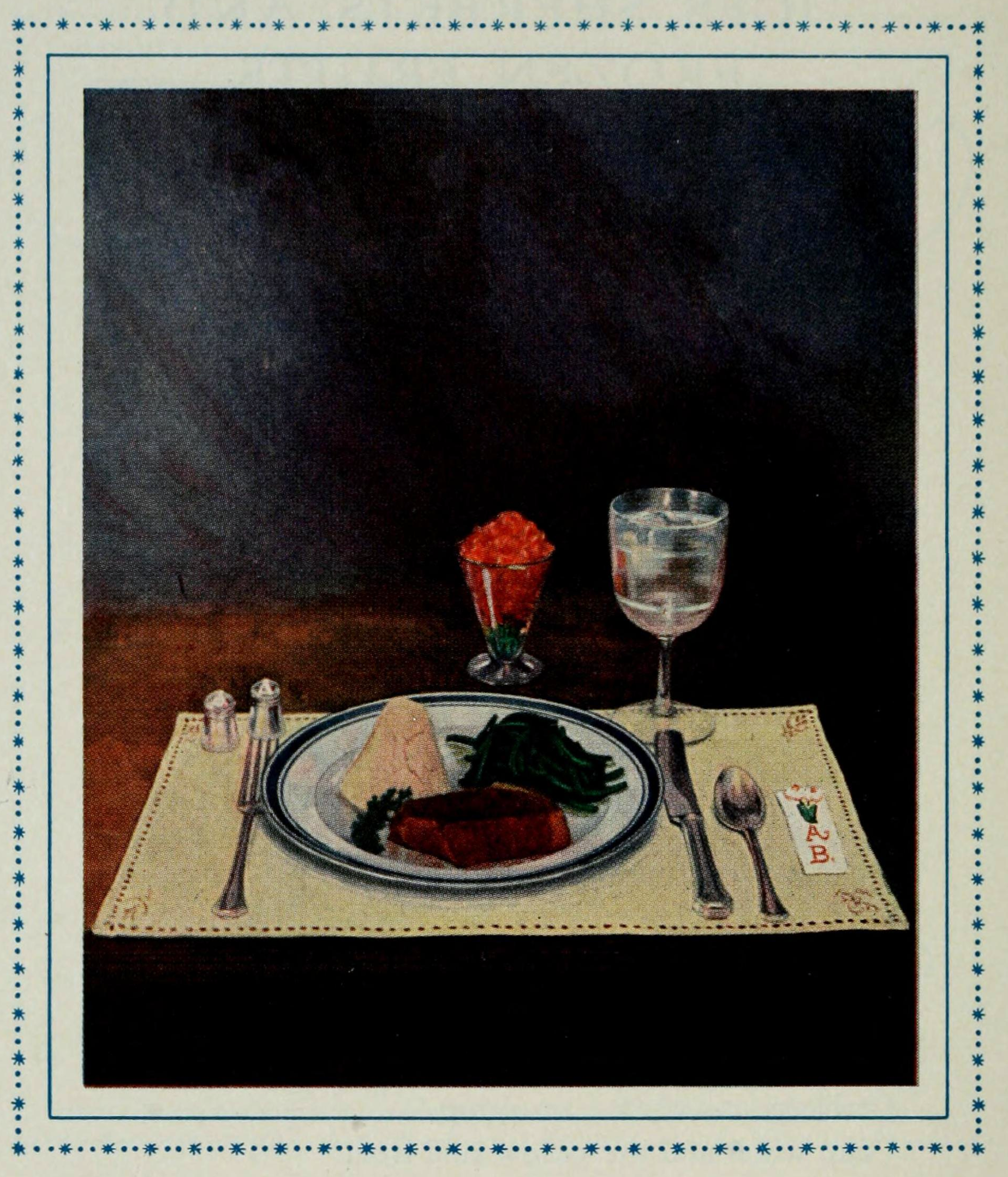
1927 illustration of Tomato Frappé served with a meal of beefsteak

Refrigerator companies and others published cookbooks with recipes for frozen salads. Among these, frozen fruit salads and frozen cheese salads were among the most popular, sometimes appearing combined with the addition of American cheese or cream cheese to frozen fruit salad recipes. One version of the frozen cheese salad was published in a 1924 Seattle compilation cookbook as "Fruit and Flower Mission Frozen Cheese Salad":

Mix the cream cheese with the mayonnaise and whipped cream. Stir in the [jarred] pimientos, peppers, and pecans. Season to taste with salt, pepper, and paprika. Pack into a mold (note: individual serving molds are fun) and freeze until firm. Dip the mold in warm water and turn out on a platter. Serve with mayonnaise.

Other popular frozen salads of the era included a ginger ale and pear salad, as well as ones of meat—chicken, salmon, tuna, and crabmeat—and vegetables, such as asparagus and celery. Within such savory versions, cream and mayonnaise were often present. A frozen tomato-based salad popular at the time was named tomato frappé, loosely related to the concept of a salad. Making it typically involved a process of cooking tomatoes and onions and flavorings such as bay leaves, before straining and then freezing the ingredients. Frozen tomato salads remained popular in the following decades: in 1942 socialite Wallis Simpson included a recipe for it as a component of a "typical southern" dinner, and later in the decade the author and poet Julia Cooley Altrocchi listed it as an element in a menu for a "Savory and Exotic Italian Formal Dinner". The association with Southern United States cooking could be seen again in 1950, when Chicago and Southern Air Lines's food and beverage director described a "plantation frozen tomato salad" as among the airline's most popular dishes. (Note: On the association with Southern United States cooking, food historian Richard Foss writes the salad is "a dish that modern diners would connect with the food crazes of the era more than Southern traditions"; on the connection to Italian food, food journalist John F. Mariani says the dish and the meal would "at best puzzle and at worst nauseate an Italian hostess", and constitute for Italian-Americans "a sin even to think of eating such things.")

=== Fruit salad ===
Frozen fruit salads were especially appealing in households without domestic workers who wanted to entertain guests. These salads were prepared by mixing canned fruits such as pineapples, apricots, pears, peaches and maraschino cherries with whipped cream and mayonnaise and freezing them in hemispheric, rectangular, or cubic containers. At dinner, they could be portioned onto lettuce leaves or into glassware for an entrée, salad, or dessert. One method of serving is recounted in a 1937 article in the Ice Cream Trade Journal, which describes the salads as popular at bridge parties, where they were served on lettuce, often topped with mayonnaise alongside crackers and sandwiches.

In 1922, frozen fruit salad entered popular awareness in the Philippines after "Frozen Pampanga Fruit Salad" was described in Culinary Arts of the Tropics, a publication assembled by the wives of American colonial officials. From this point, frozen fruit salads appeared in marketing and home economics classes, impressing upon young Filipinos the belief that America was free of scarcity, unlike their home where the cost of freezers, canned fruit, and condensed milk made frozen fruit salads inaccessible. In America during the 1950s, fruit cocktail from a can gained popularity in frozen fruit salads. Frozen fruit salads continue to be eaten today in the US. In the Philippines, the dessert buko salad is sometimes served frozen, made with canned fruit cocktail, macapuno strings or grated coconut, nata de coco, palm fruit, cream and sweetened condensed milk.

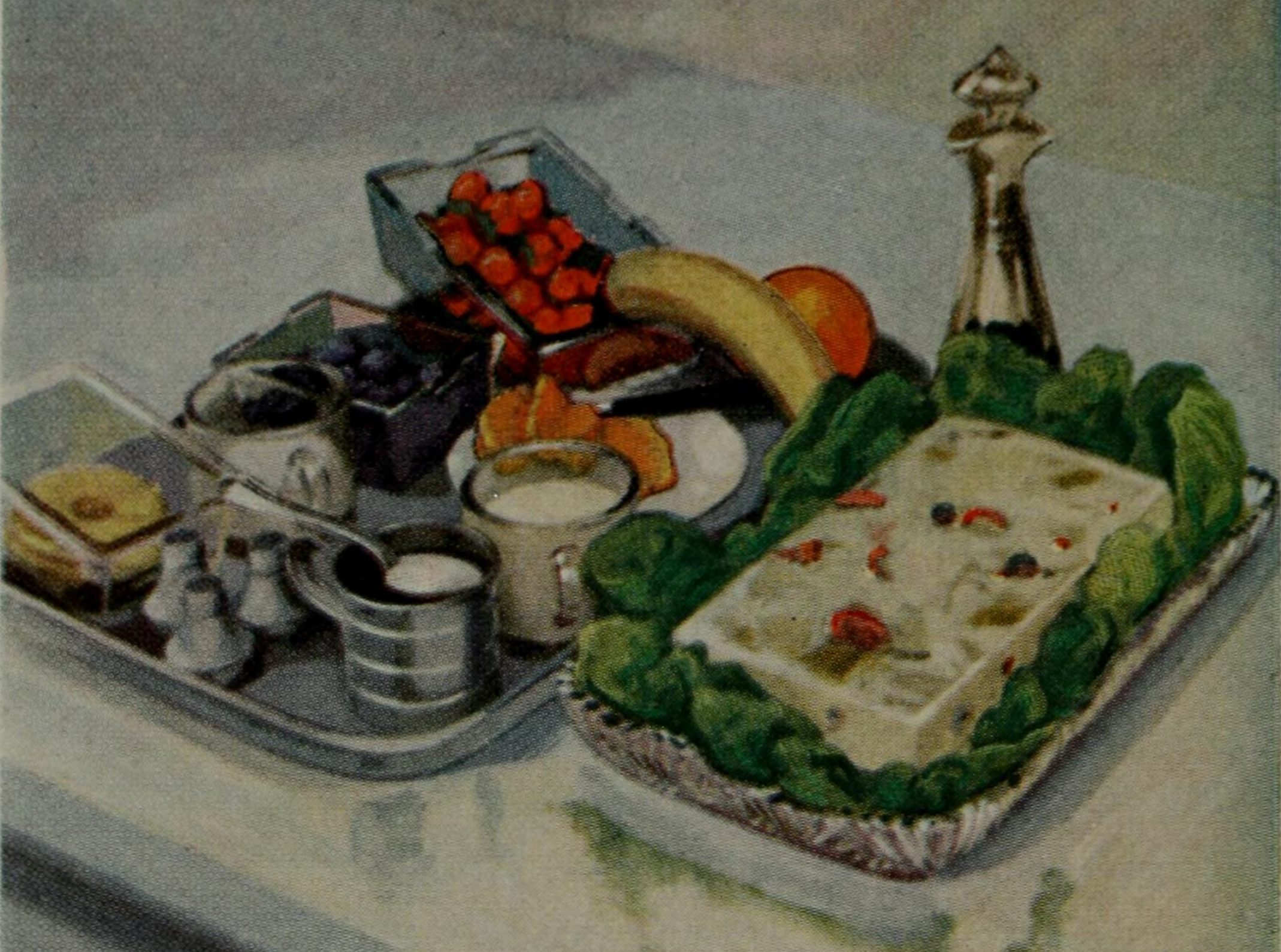
1927 illustration of frozen fruit salad, displayed with its ingredients

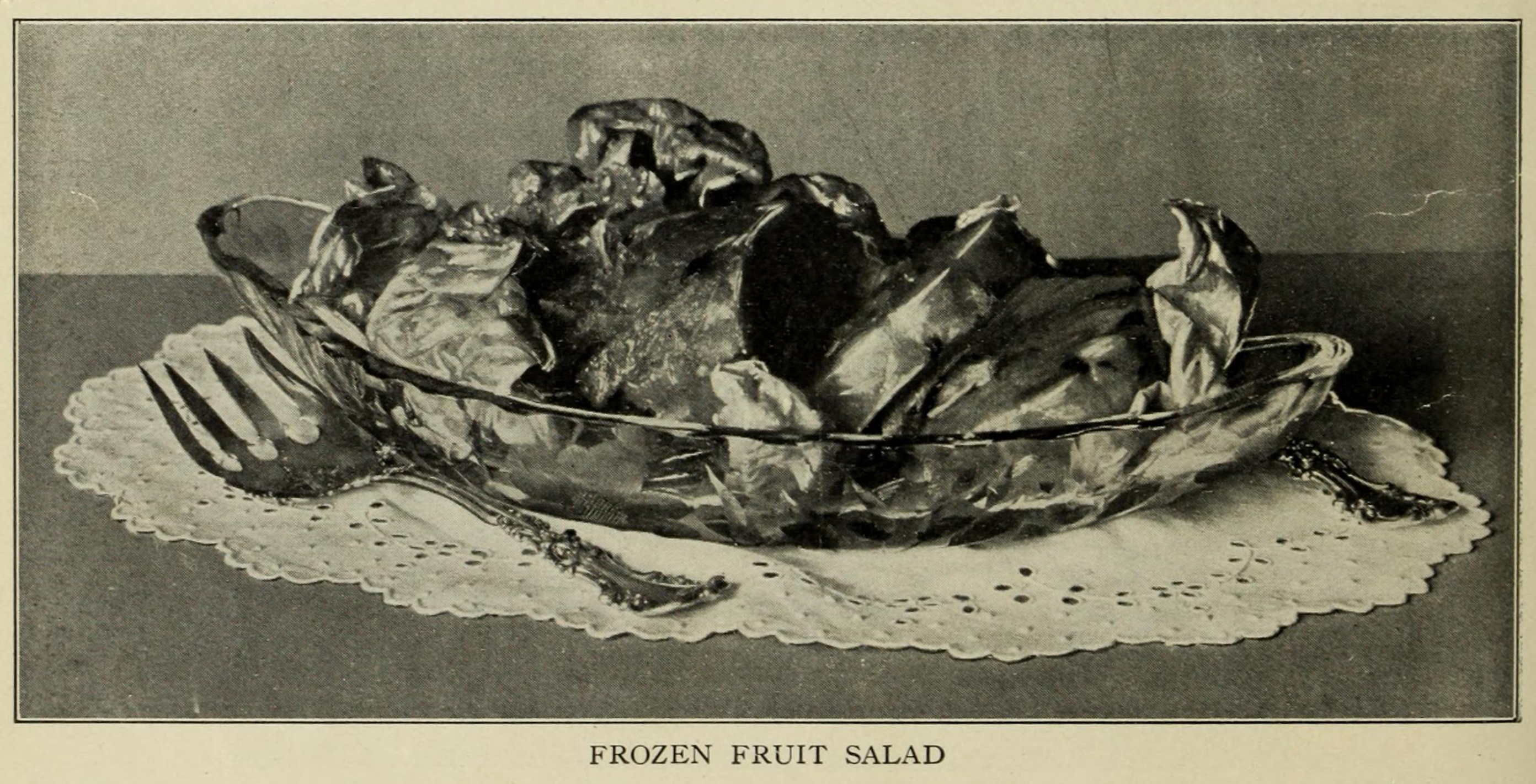
1915 Frozen Fruit Salad, served on a lettuce leaf. The method of preparation is described in the footnotes: (Note: A quart sized mold is filled with canned fruit (peaches, pineapple, pears or quinces) and some of their liquid. The recipe instructs to "spread paper over the mold and press the cover in place. Pack the mold in equal measures of rock salt and crushed ice and let stand about two hours. The mixture should not be frozen too stiff. Serve, cut in slices, on nests of lettuce hearts with a salad dressing", either a French dressing or a lemon-based mayonnaise dressing, in the latter perhaps including whipped cream.)

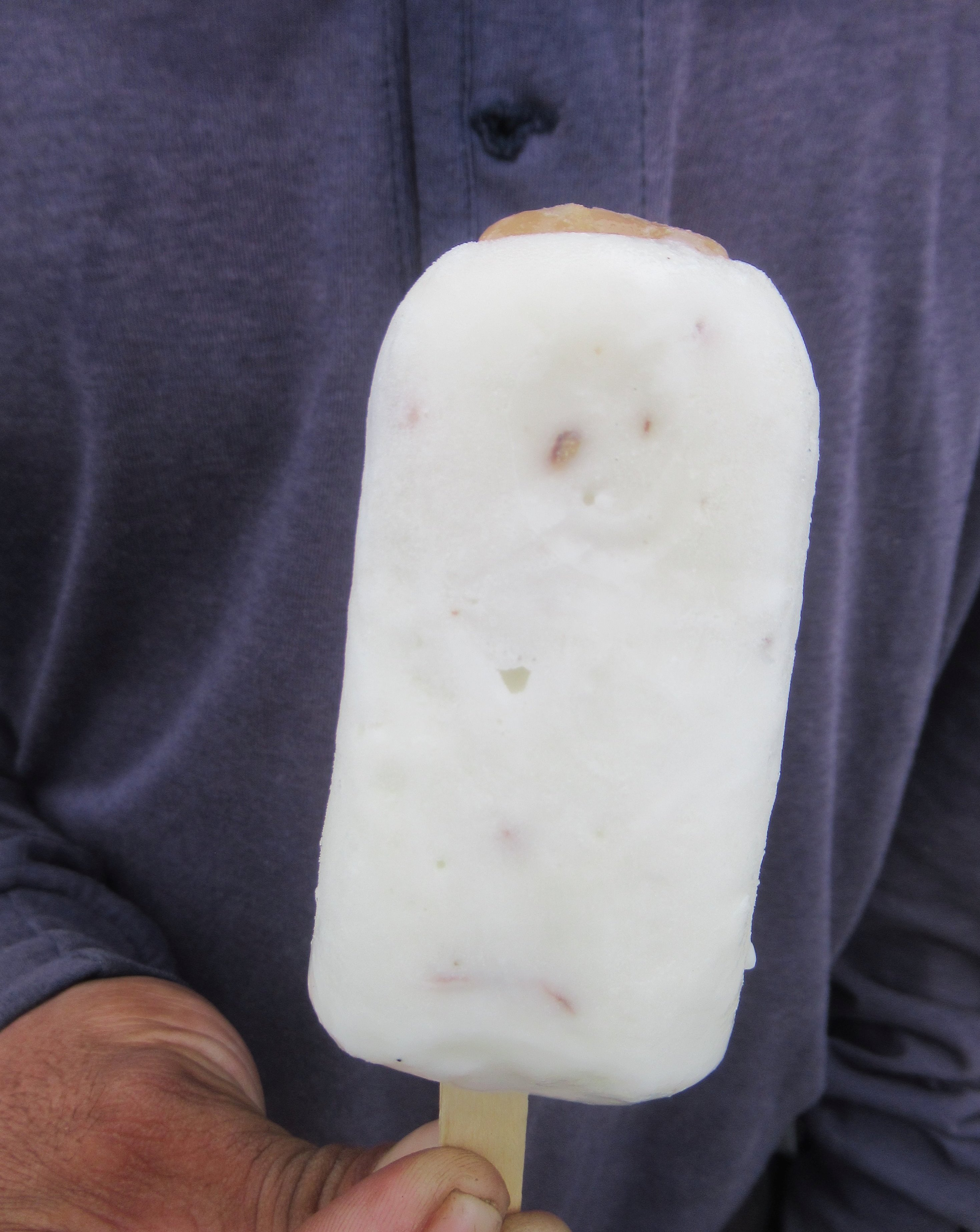
Buko salad as an ice cream bar

== See also ==
- Jello salad
- List of salads

== Sources ==
- "Frozen Fruit Salad". American Cookery. Vol. XX. The Boston Cooking-School Magazine Company. June 1915.
- Ferris, Marcie Cohen (2014). The Edible South: The Power of Food and the Making of an American Region. Chapel Hill, North Carolina: University of North Carolina Press. ISBN 978-1-4696-1768-8.
- Foss, Richard (2015). Food in the Air and Space: The Surprising History of Food and Drink in the Skies. London: Rowman & Littlefield. ISBN 978-1-4422-2728-6.
- Lovegren, Sylvia (1995). Fashionable Food: Seven Decades of Food Fads. New York: Macmillan. ISBN 978-0-02-575705-9.
- Mabalon, Dawn Bohulano (2013). "As American as Jackrabbit Adobo: Cooking, Eating, and Becoming Filipina/o American before World War II". In Ku, Robert Ji-Song; Manalansan, Martin F; Mannur, Anita (eds.). Eating Asian America: A Food Studies Reader. New York & London: New York University Press. ISBN 9781479869251.
- Mariani, John F (2011). How Italian Food Conquered the World. New York: Palgrave Macmillan. ISBN 978-0-230-10439-6.
- Quinizo, Jeri (2009). Of Sugar and Snow: A History of Ice Cream Making. Berkeley, California and London: University of California Press. ISBN 978- 0- 520- 24861- 8.
