= Sicilian orange salad =

Spanish and Sicilian salad dish

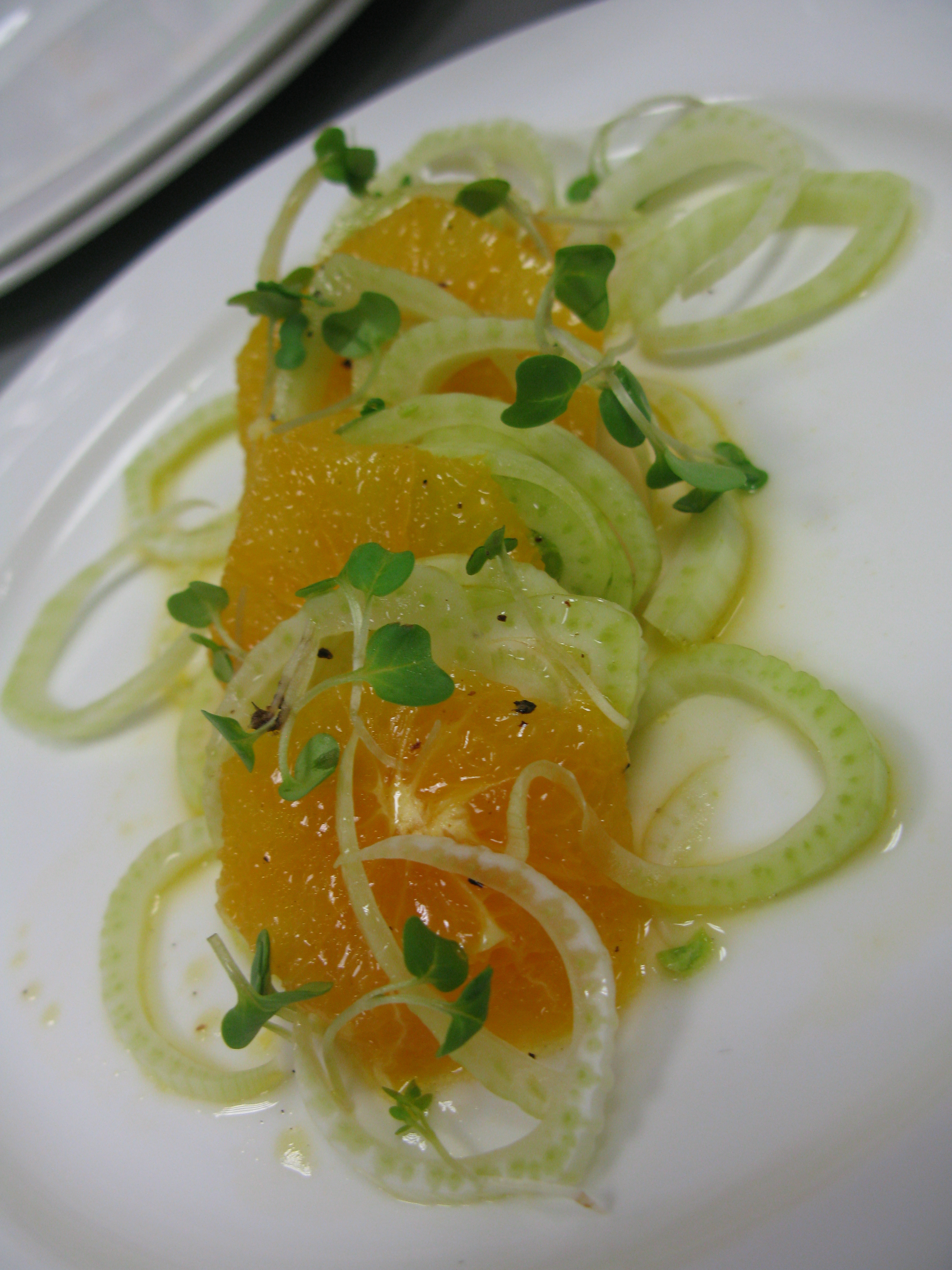
- Alternative names: Insalata di arance (in Italian)
- Type: Salad
- Place of origin: Italy; Spain
- Main ingredients: Oranges, olive oil, black pepper

Sicilian orange salad, known in Italian as insalata di arance, is a typical salad dish of the Spanish and Sicilian cuisine, which uses oranges as its main ingredient. It is usually served at the beginning or at the end of a meal.

In its most basic form the salad consists of thin, tart orange slices served with olive oil, salt, and black pepper. The slightly tart taste of the salad, which is usually achieved by using a vinaigrette, is provided by the orange slices themselves.

Common variations mix the orange slices with a few additional ingredients such as sliced fennel bulbs, onions, and black olives. In such cases often a vinaigrette is added as well, which is made with olive oil, white wine vinegar, salt, pepper, and various herbs, e.g. rosemary.

== See also ==
- Sicilian cuisine
- List of salads
- List of fruit dishes
