= Bionico =

Mexican dessert

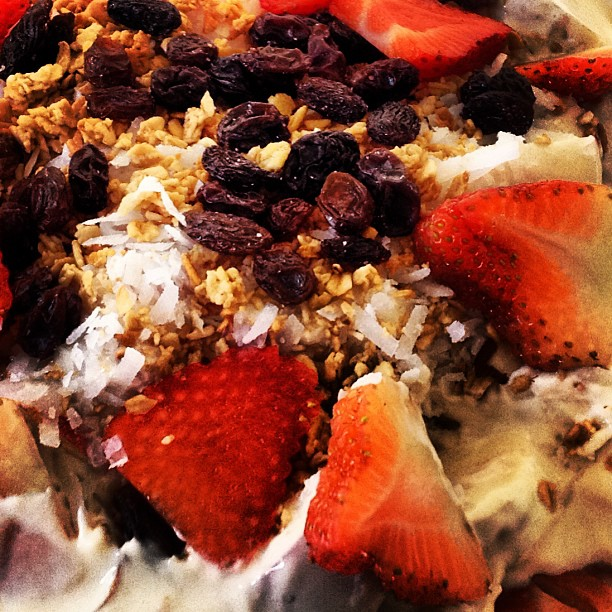
- Close up shot of a bionico with strawberries, banana, raisins, shredded coconut and granola
- Type: Fruit salad
- Course: Dessert
- Place of origin: Mexico
- Region or state: Guadalajara, Jalisco
- Serving temperature: Cold
- Main ingredients: Chopped fruits, sour cream, condensed milk, granola, shredded coconut, raisins
- Ingredients generally used: Cottage cheese, honey

Bionico is a popular Mexican dessert that originated in the city of Guadalajara in Jalisco, Mexico, in the early 1990s. It is essentially a fruit salad consisting of a variety of fruits chopped up into small cubes, drenched with crema and topped off with granola, shredded coconut, raisins and sometimes honey. Any kind of fruit can be used, but it is most commonly made with papaya, cantaloupe, honeydew, strawberries, apples and banana.

== Origins and Family Legacy ==
According to the Gómez Ruiz family, one of the earliest versions of the biónico was created in the early 1970s at the Mercado Alcalde in Guadalajara. Gómez Ruiz developed a fruit-based dessert known as the rickyross, which used a blend of fresh fruit juice and blended guava as a sweet topping. This preparation eventually evolved into what is now widely known as the biónico.

== The crema ==
The word crema is Spanish for cream, in this case the "crema" is usually a mix of condensed milk and sour cream, although there are many different recipes (some include yogurt). There is another variation of the salad which uses cottage cheese instead of the crema. This variation is usually served with honey drizzled on top.

== See also ==
- List of Mexican dishes
- List of salads
