= Malvern pudding =

Fruit and custard pudding

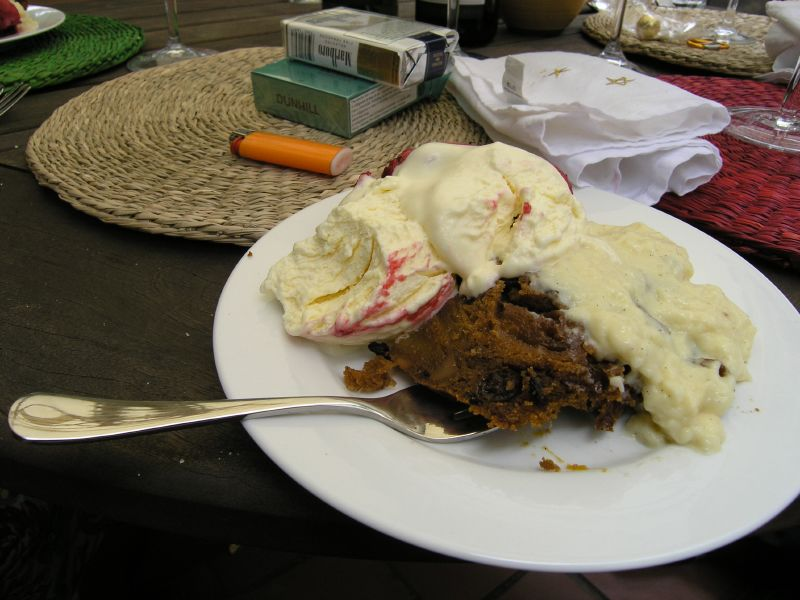
- Type: Pudding
- Place of origin: United Kingdom
- Region or state: Malvern, Worcestershire
- Main ingredients: Apples or other seasonal fruit, custard

Malvern pudding is a traditional pudding from the English town of Malvern in Worcestershire. It is a baked dish made with apples or other seasonal fruit and custard although variations exist.

In 2010 it was listed as one of the ten most "threatened puddings" after a survey conducted by UKTV Food.

== See also ==
- List of custard desserts
