= Billy Reid (fashion designer) =

American fashion designer (born 1964)

Billy Reid (born June 13, 1964) is an American fashion designer based in Florence, Alabama. His line includes menswear, womenswear, accessories and eyewear. His clothing, self-described as "lived-in luxury" and "broken-in luxury", is known for its unusual accents and Southern influence. Reid summarizes his brand's concept as "American luxury built to last". Billy Reid, Marc Jacobs, Tom Ford, and Michael Kors are the only fashion designers who have won 3 or more CFDA Awards. In 2026, Gary Muto joined the company as chief executive officer, succeeding Jeff Zens.

== Early life and education ==
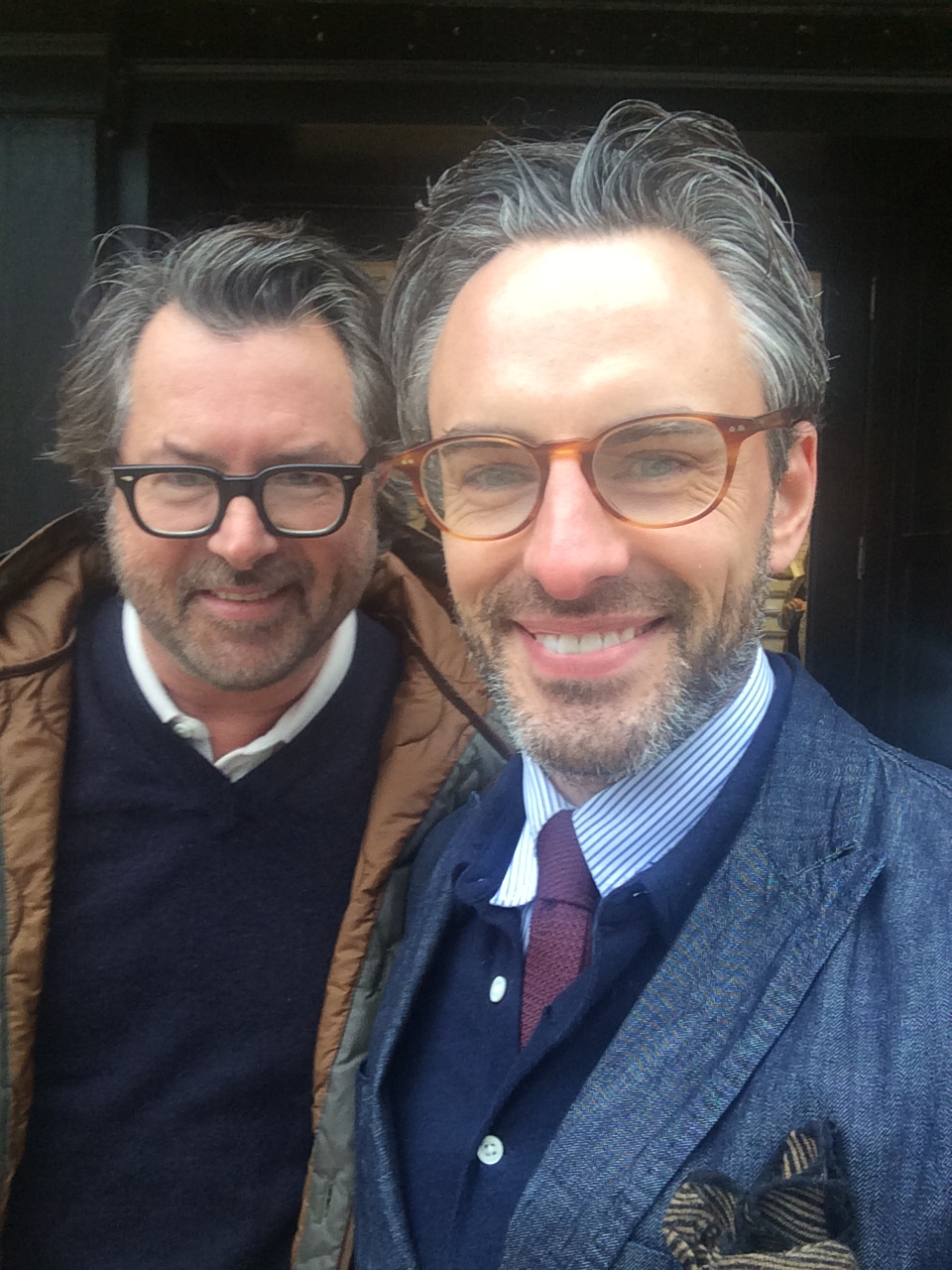
Billy Reid (left) in front of the West Loop, Chicago boutique

Reid grew up in Amite, Louisiana (/eɪˈmiːt/ ay-MEET), just south of the Mississippi border. He helped his mother operate a women's clothing boutique located in his grandmother's home which stocked then-new brands including Gloria Vanderbilt and Calvin Klein. Reid's hobbies included outdoor activities in the surrounding Southeast Louisiana wetlands. Reid's first job was at family friend Joe Buddy Anderson's menswear store The Royal Oak in Hammond, Louisiana. Originally wanting to become a football coach during his youth, Reid attended Southeastern Louisiana University and then transferred to the Art Institute of Dallas to study fashion design and merchandising. While studying full-time at the Art Institute of Dallas, he worked full-time for Saks Fifth Avenue in men's tailored clothes and sportswear, opening the Polo Ralph Lauren shop-in-shop. After graduating, a stockbroker friend convinced a 23-year-old Reid to join him in moving to California to pursue acting. Reid abandoned the Hollywood dream after three days and instead worked for six years at Reebok International at the beginning of the brand's introduction of clothing, first selling in a five-state territory and then working in design in New York City for the brand's presence in Foot Locker. Reid moved to Boston and travelled across the globe for the first collections of Australian golfer Greg Norman. After moving to Texas with his future wife, he later did freelance design for Fruit of the Loom, Neiman Marcus, Takashimaya, and J. C. Penney.

== Brand history ==
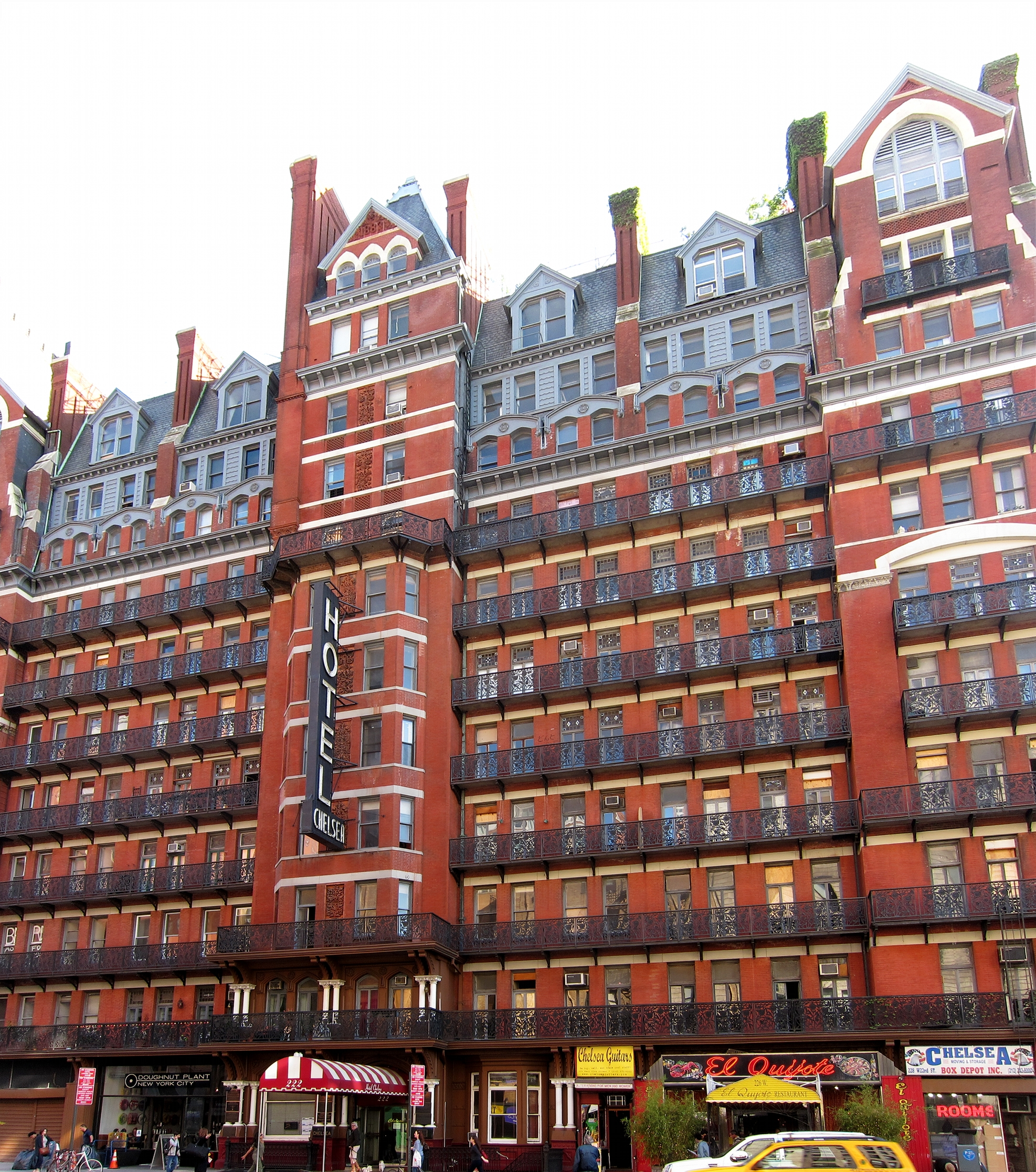
A room at the Hotel Chelsea served as an office, studio and showroom for the brand in its early days

Reid originally launched his men's collection under the William Reid label in March 1998. When Reid started the business in 1998, it was a one-man operation; he lived in the Garment Center, while a room at the Hotel Chelsea served as an office, studio and showroom. The William Reid brand was focused on wholesale account partnerships rather than directly owned retail stores, with Fred Segal and Stanley Korshak as its main wholesale partners. Reid received the CFDA Best New Menswear Designer award in 2001. The brand held a successful runway show on September 10, 2001, but economic effects arising from the September 11 attacks forced him to close the business shortly thereafter. Reid and his wife moved in with his in-laws in Florence, Alabama, just across the Tennessee River from Muscle Shoals (home of the famous Muscle Shoals Sound Studio, where The Rolling Stones, Elton John, Willie Nelson, Paul Simon, Bob Dylan, and others have recorded).

In the initial aftermath of 9/11, Reid reached out to Reebok, TaylorMade and other contacts to find freelance design work to make ends meet for his wife and young children. After the economy improved, Reid's post-9/11 business model built up a small namesake chain of shops which reflected his "personality and his aesthetic," loaded with antiques, family heirlooms and reclaimed architectural materials. In 2004, Charles Moore, legendary photographer of the Civil Rights Movement, shot the first photos for the brand. The first Billy Reid stores opened in 2004 in Dallas and Houston showing menswear only; the women's collection started in 2007. Wholesale distribution began in 2009. Investors included Kemmons Wilson Companies, an investment company founded by the heirs of the Holiday Inn hotel chain.

The company headquarters is in Florence, Alabama, in a historic bookstore. Downstairs is his flagship shop and upstairs is his design studio. The brand operates 12 directly owned stores with a unique atmosphere: well-worn chairs and carpets, antique chandeliers, mounted animals, and antique apothecary cabinets. Reid has said: "We're based in Alabama and work in New York; It's the balance of those two worlds that our aesthetic is about." Reid cites Ralph Lauren, Calvin Klein, Perry Ellis as influential American designers, and has named Bill Robinson as "one of [his] biggest influences." Vogue noted the brand's "relaxed charm and rolled-up elegance." In early 2017, Observer magazine called Reid "perhaps the most-likable player on the American menswear scene." The Washington Post has described Reid's aesthetic as "worn luxury". and W magazine named it "Southern Gentleman sartorialism". Vogue described the fall 2018 collection as "country luxury".

In early 2018, Mark Daley became the CEO, joining the brand from Smythson, and serving until December 2020 upon taking the helm of Esprit.

In 2019 The New York Times described the brand as "at once classic and urbane, while still rugged, coarse and unafraid of hard work."

In 2022 the brand opened a pop-up shop at Platform in Culver City.

Billy Reid Inc. acquired the direct-to-consumer arm of made-to-measure company Knot Standard in 2024; Knot Standard will be a minority shareholder in the combined business. The purchase will expand Reid’s retail locations from 12 to 20 in the US. The former Knot Standard boutiques were re-branded as Billy Reid Custom.

The company’s primary financial supporter has been Kemmons Wilson Companies, a Memphis-based investment firm owned by the family owners of the Holiday Inn hotel chain. In addition to Kemmons Wilson Companies, Hong Kong-based product development and sourcing firm Newtimes Group made a strategic investment in Billy Reid, and also owns Robert Talbott.

== Production ==
The garments are made in the US, Peru, Italy, and Japan, and more recently in India and China using French, Italian and Japanese fabrics. In May 2012 Billy Reid and Natalie Chanin planted a 7-acre field of organic cotton for use in their clothing lines.

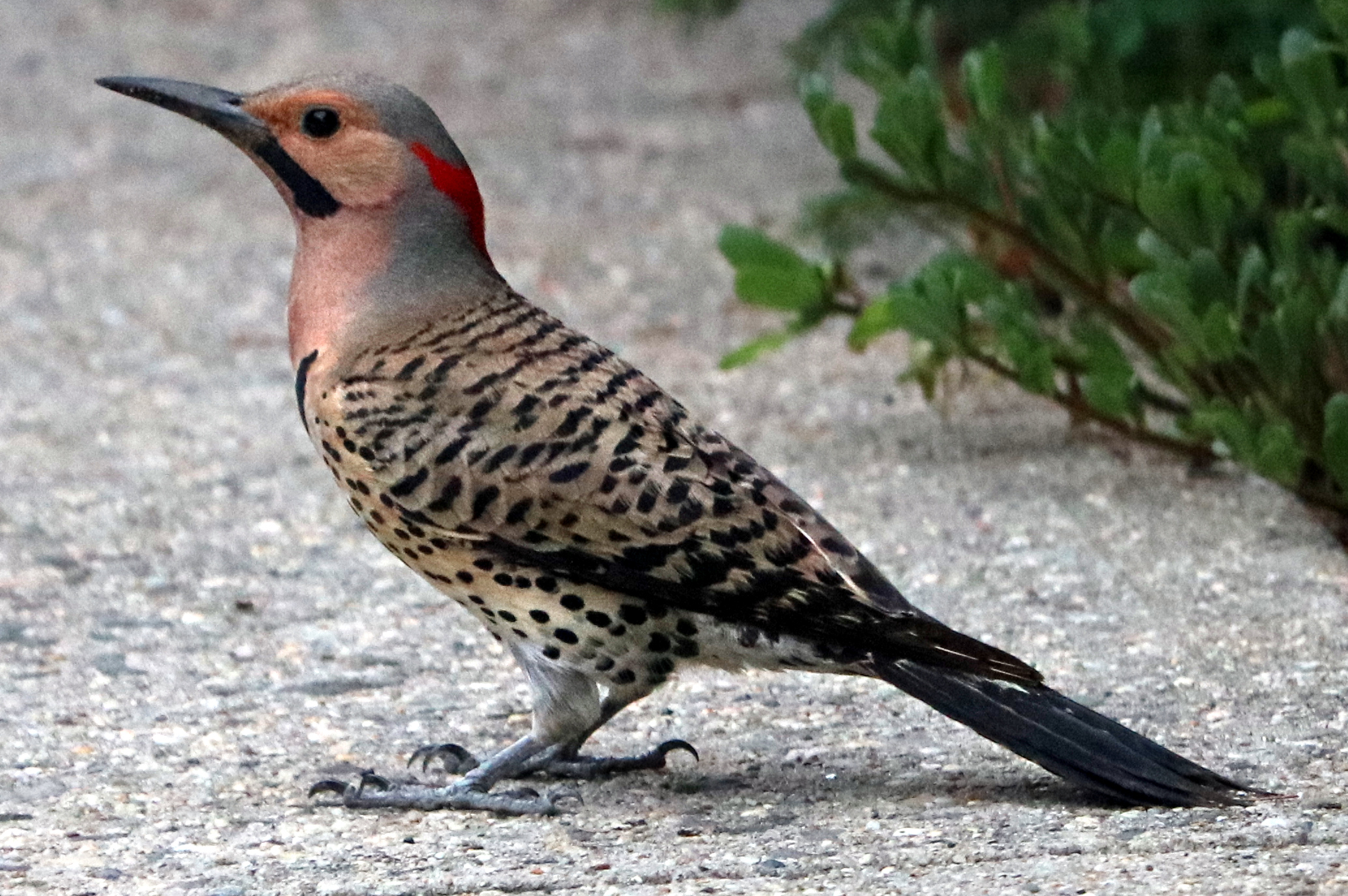
The black and yellow striping of the yellowhammer bird is part of Billy Reid branding

The Billy Reid eyewear collection includes sunglasses and optical frames, and made in Japan with CR-39 lenses. The collection included sunglasses modeled on Reid's signature personal frames made from sustainable buffalo horn. Design details include leather-wrapped frames, ultra-light titanium nose pads, Italian acetate, and gradient lenses. The eyewear capsule collection debuted in the Frank Lloyd Wright-designed Rosenbaum House in August 2017 as part of the annual Billy Reid Shindig, and 13 styles were delivered to stores in November 2017. The limited-edition buffalo horn frame sunglasses named for Billy and his wife are boxed in wood finished with an ancient Japanese wood-burning technique called yakisugi (焼杉) meaning "burnt cypress". Reid names Michael Caine and Buddy Holly as icons of men's eyewear style.

The fall/winter 2017 collection included shirts with yellowhammer embroidery, and the bird became a de facto symbol of the brand. As the state bird of Alabama, the subspecies of Colaptes auratus is known by the common name "yellowhammer", a term that originated during the American Civil War to describe soldiers from Alabama. The bird has black and gold striping on its wing that is similar to the Billy Reid Signature Heirloom Ribbon, a black and gold ribbon with a bias stripe. The brand releases new products 10 times per year rather than once per season.

== Clientele ==
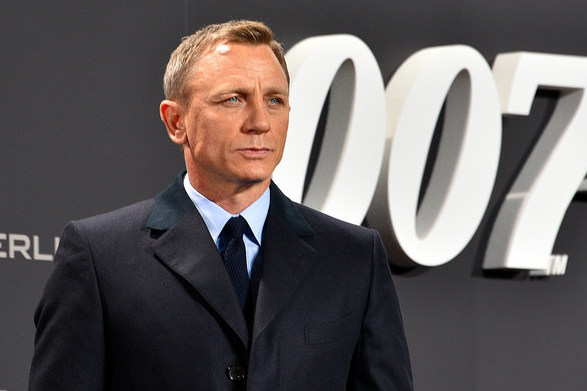
Actor Daniel Craig wore a Billy Reid peacoat in Skyfall in scenes set in Shanghai

Actor Daniel Craig purchased the Bond peacoat at the Billy Reid Nashville store while shopping with a member of Kings of Leon, and a few years later requested it for wardrobing in the 2012 Bond film Skyfall; this exposed the brand to a wider audience and resulted in e-commerce purchases of the coat in 25 countries. The coat was named after Bond Street, the location of the brand's flagship store in New York City. In Spectre, actor Ben Whishaw as Q wore the Billy Reid Astor Coat. Mike Faist, John T. Edge, Ethan Hawke, Idris Elba, and filmmaker Jordan Walker-Pearlman are also fans of the brand. Ryan Gosling wore a Billy Reid topcoat in London while promoting Blade Runner 2049.

== Shindig ==
Reid has hosted "a multicultural weekend of fashion, art, food, music & friends" called Shindig, which started as an informal gathering of close friends in 2009, and was held for its 8th Alabama summer edition in late summer 2016. That year, attendees included musician Jack White, musician Alison Mosshart of The Kills, model Matthew Mosshart, the band Dawes, Tony Award winning actor Alex Sharp, musician John Paul White and The Watson Twins, jewelry designer Pamela Love, Chef John Currence, Master Brewer Roy Milner of Blackberry Farm Brewery, former Bloomingdales men's fashion director Josh Peskowitz, and designer Natalie Chanin of Alabama Chanin.

Shindig No. 9 was held in Muscle Shoals, Alabama, on the weekend of August 25–27, 2017. Guests at Shindig No. 9 included Jason Isbell and The 400 Unit, Preservation Hall Jazz Band, Jack White, Ron Gallo, Russ Pollard, Cedric Burnside, Carl Broemel of My Morning Jacket, Del McCoury Band, John Currence, and John T. Edge. At Shindig No. 9, Tesla Motors provided vehicles for Shindig guests to test drive, following Reid's collaboration with Tesla to install an electric car charging station on the campus of University of North Alabama in Florence. Former Per Se head sommelier Andre Mack was the wine sponsor for Shindig No. 9, showing his Willamette Valley AVA pinot gris and pinot noir varietals. Billy Reid Shindig 10 was held in Florence, Alabama on August 24–26, 2018. Kacey Musgraves, Dan Auerbach, and St. Paul and The Broken Bones performed at Shindig 10. Billy Reid Shindig 11 will be held in Florence, Alabama on August 23–25, 2019 with musical acts including The Raconteurs, Margo Price, The Blind Boys of Alabama, Drivin N Cryin, The Watson Twins, Cautious Clay, Motel Radio, and Dirty Dozen Brass Band, and a fashion show for the brand's Spring 2020 collection.

Billy Reid partnered with Third Man Records to host an Austin Shindig at SXSW Music Festival in Austin, Texas in 2015. The event included shows by Natalie Prass, Steve Gunn, Bully, Laura Marling, Broncho, La Luz, Hurray for the Riff Raff, Gill Landry and Olivia Jean.

On March 17, 2016 Reid and Newport Folk Festival hosted Austin Shindig No. 6 during the annual SXSW festival at Weather Up in Austin, Texas. The lineup that year included country music singer Kacey Musgraves, American funk/soul/R&B singer Charles Bradley, and Muscle Shoals native and artist, Dylan Leblanc; American alternative country musician, "Jonny" Fritz was the MC at the event.

A Billy Reid Shindig event was held at Blackberry Farm in Walland, Tennessee on November 16–19, 2017. Grammy award-winning artist and producer, Dan Auerbach performed; James Beard award-winning chef and author Daniel Patterson cooked for the group; and winemaker Russell From of Herman Story Wines in Paso Robles guided a wine tasting. A follow-up Blackberry Farm Shindig was held in November 2018. The guest chef was Edouardo Jordan of Salare and JuneBaby, and the guest winemaker was Cushing Donelan of Donelan Wines.

Shindig was postponed for 5 years during the COVID-19 pandemic and returned in 2024 to celebrate the 20th anniversary of Billy Reid as a brand. The 12th Shindig, celebrating 20 years of the Billy Reid brand, featured The Kills, Gillian Welch & David Rawlings, Abraham Alexander, The Brook & The Bluff, and other musical acts.

== Retail locations ==
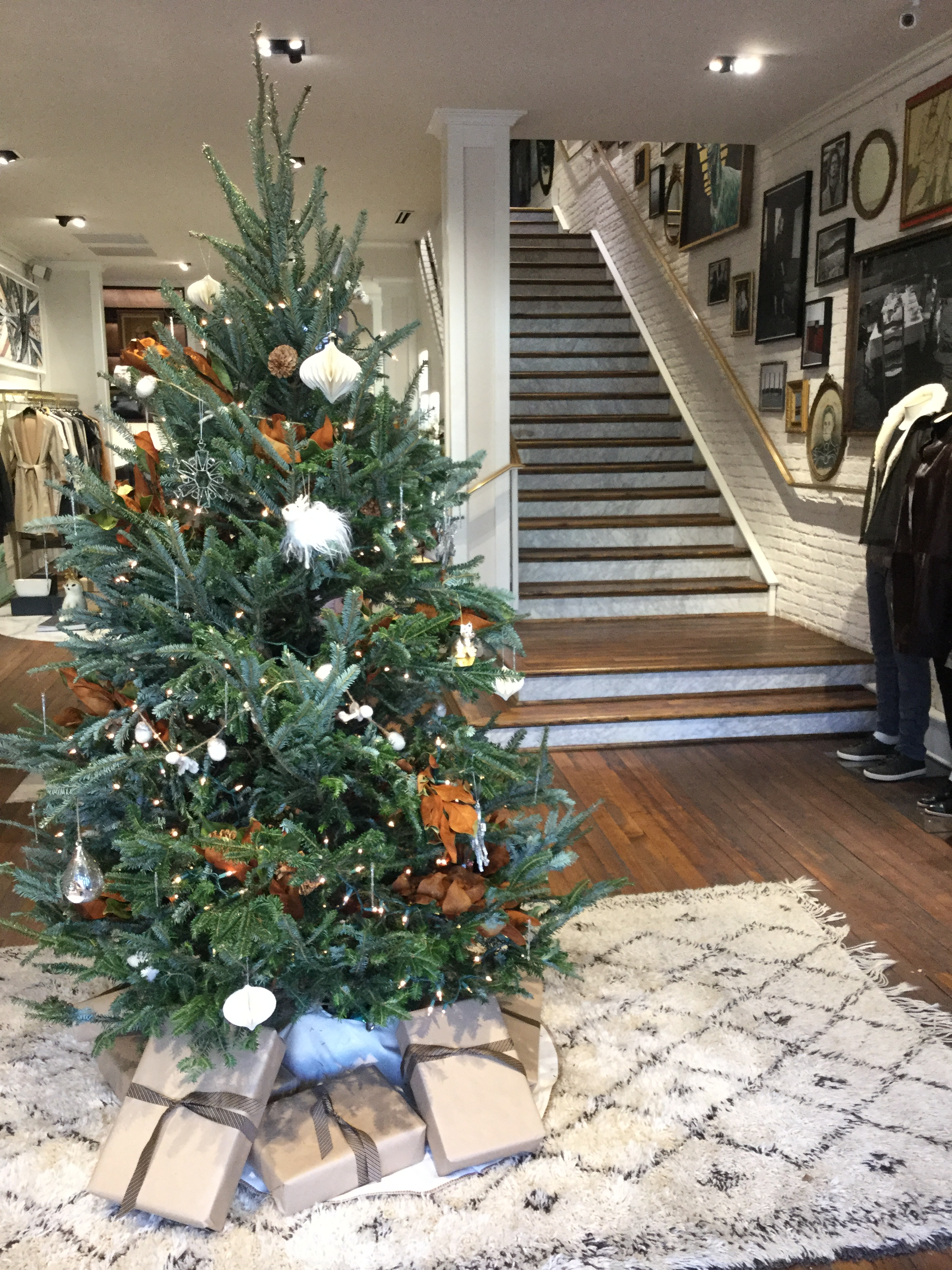
Billy Reid stores typically contain artwork and subtle design details such as the marble risers in this staircase

Dallas and Houston were the first cities in which the brand opened retail stores, followed a year later by the flagship store in Florence, Alabama. Billy Reid shops are located in:

- Atlanta (Buckhead)
- Austin, Texas (Sixth Street)
- Birmingham, Alabama
- Charleston, South Carolina
- Chicago (Fulton Market)
- Dallas at NorthPark Center
- Edina, Minnesota
- Florence, Alabama
- Nashville (Edgehill Village)
- New York City (Flatiron Building and West Village)
- New Orleans (Magazine Street)
- Venice, California (Abbot Kinney Boulevard)

A store was opened in Fort Worth, Texas in November 2019; it later closed.

In the US the brand is sold in Neiman Marcus, Nordstrom, and Bloomingdale's. The brand held a month-long pop-up shop in Culver City, California, in 2017 inside menswear store Magasin; the popup included Reid's made-to-measure service.

Multi-brand boutiques that carry the brand include Brigade in Cleveland, Ohio; Tenet in Southampton, New York; DLM Supply Co. in Dallas, Texas; Sy Devore in Studio City, California; Rothman's in New York; Carriere in Westlake Village, California; Garmany in Red Bank, New Jersey; Rodes in Louisville, Kentucky; Sebastian's Closet in Dallas, Texas; Weitzenkorn's in Pottstown, Pennsylvania, Martin Patrick 3 in Minneapolis, Minnesota. and ULAH in Westwood, Kansas

Outside of the US, the brand is carried at Nordstrom in Canada, and Selfridges in the UK.

== Collaborations ==
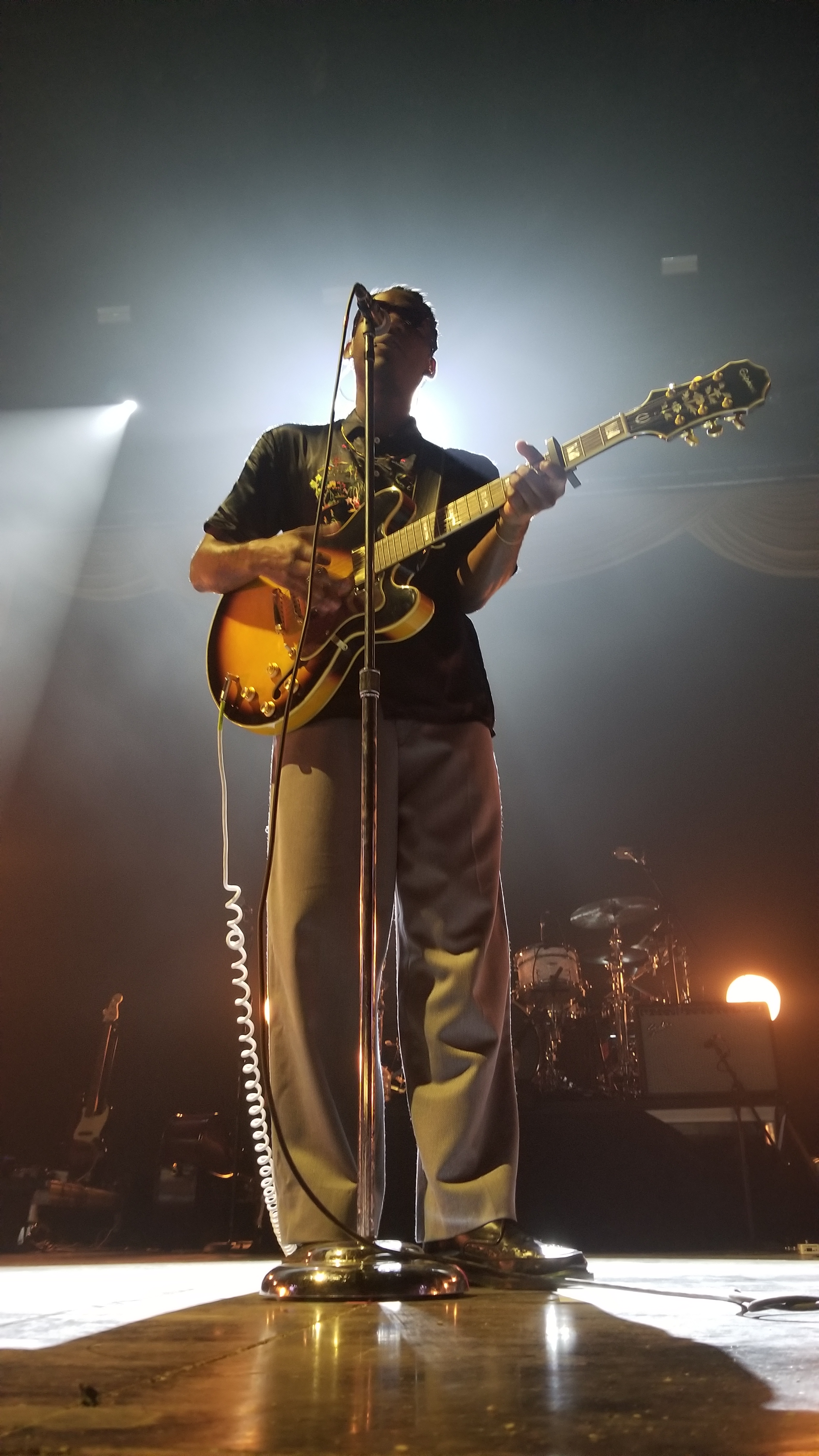
Leon Bridges has inspired the brand

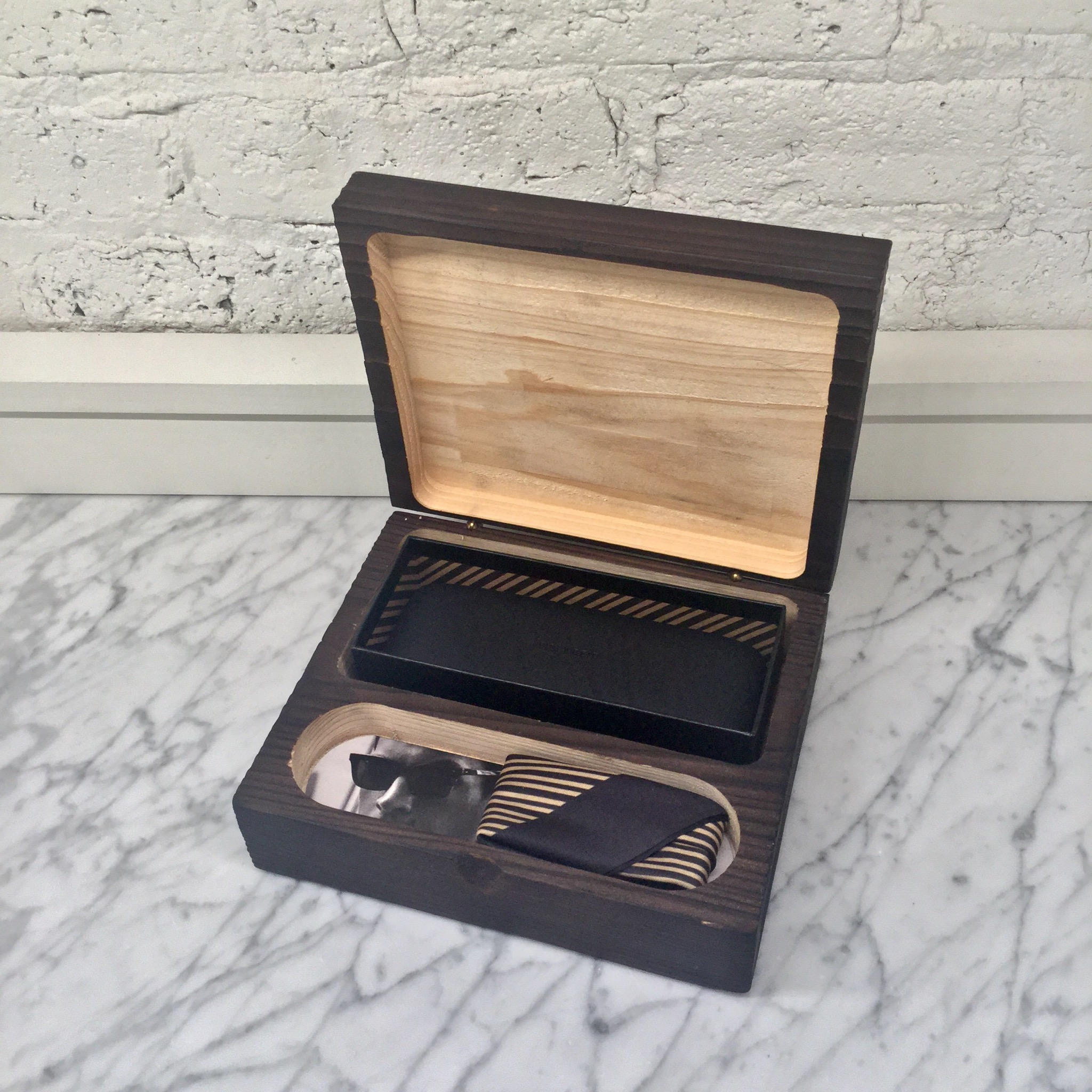
Yakisugi treated wood is used in boxes for sunglasses

K-Swiss and Billy Reid have produced co-branded sneakers. While all other Billy Reid shoes are Made in Italy, the K-Swiss co-sign sneakers are entirely made in America; they were produced in Batavia, New York in the second-oldest shoe factory in the US. The K-Swiss/Billy Reid collaboration began in 2011.

Reid, Derek Lam, Reed Krakoff, Simon Doonan, and other fashion industry experts formed the advisory board for the Cadillac/CFDA Retail Lab mentorship program, which provided a $75,000 grant along with business development, marketing, and PR assistance for six up-and-coming designers.

The GunRunner Boutique Hotel in Florence, Alabama, has a Billy Reid Suite featuring a ladder and sleeping loft, and is curated with items rotated in and out on a regular basis. As a part of designing the space, Reid personally built the bed for the room.

In 2013, the brand partnered with Coach on a collection of bags and wallets.

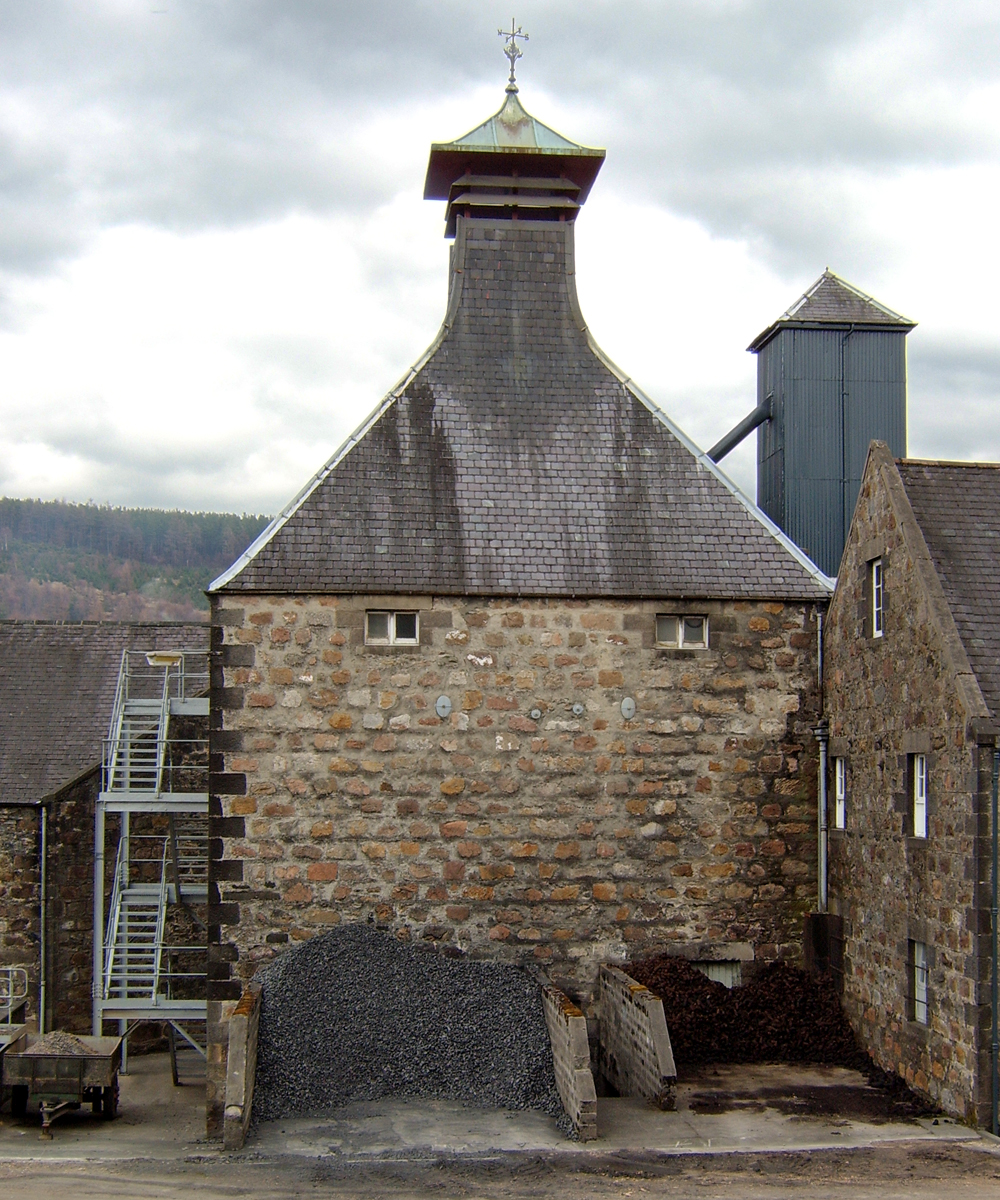
The Speyside single malt Scotch distilled at The Balvenie was the official liquor of Billy Reid in 2019

In 2019 the brand partnered with Balvenie Scotch, showcasing the 12-year DoubleWood at all Billy Reid retail locations and all Shindig events.

The brand collaborates with chefs including Katie Button to host dinner parties known as Supper Series in the brand's boutiques.

The 2022 Billy Reid x Gibson Guitar collection included men’s and women’s ready-to-wear, and guitar accessories.

== Philanthropy ==
After Scarlett Johansson wore the brand's sunglasses to the 2018 Women's March in Los Angeles, the company pledged to donate 100% of the profits from the sales of the Ian Sunglasses to the Time's Up Legal Defense Fund.

Billy Reid is a corporate sponsor of the Southern Foodways Alliance, and the brand produced a capsule collection of T-shirts, sweatshirts, caps and chef aprons to promote the member-funded nonprofit organization; 20% of proceeds from the collection benefited the Southern Foodways Alliance.

Following the catastrophic inland flooding caused by Hurricane Harvey, with economic losses estimated at between $70 billion to $200 billion, Reid hosted a warehouse sale at his Austin store and sent all proceeds to members of the Greater Houston restaurant community, and donated all proceeds from a custom created t-shirt to relief efforts.

The brand hosted an April 2018 sample sale pop-up shop at SCAD; the proceeds from the sale supported SCAD student scholarships.

In May 2018, Billy Reid partnered with the Trombone Shorty Foundation to provide music education for children in underserved communities.

== Awards and honors ==
- 2001 CFDA Best New Menswear Designer (as William Reid)
- 2009 New York Best Men's Store in New York
- 2010 GQ/CFDA Best New Menswear Designer in America Award
- 2010 CFDA/Vogue Fashion Fund Prize
- 2012 CFDA Menswear Designer of the Year
- 2017 Observer American Menswear Power List #1
- Auburn University Lifetime Achievement Award

== Personal life ==
Reid is a fan of the New Orleans Saints, and designed a custom black and gold football from Louisiana wild alligator leather for an NFL Super Bowl 50 charity auction. Reid is also a "huge LSU fan" and has "probably listened to or watched every game that's been on in [his] lifetime."

Reid has been an avid tennis player since high school, and coached his son's baseball team, which in 2016 made it to the Cal Ripken Baseball World Series in Aberdeen, Maryland. Reid designed the uniforms for the team. Pappy Van Winkle's Family Reserve is his favorite bourbon; his drink of choice is an Old Weller 107 on the rocks. Miller Lite is his go-to beer. His watch is a Rolex Submariner that his wife gave him right before they got married. Reid has stated, "I'm a music freak. I play music, I write music, I love music. ... If you look at the mood boards around here, you'd see everyone from the Allman Brothers to Pink to Kid Cudi." Reid has stated that every man should own a navy blazer, jeans, and an Oxford shirt.

== See also ==
- Tom Ford
- Perry Ellis
- Geoffrey Beene
- Bill Blass
- Ralph Lauren
- Joseph Abboud
- John Varvatos
- Todd Snyder
- Officine Générale
