= Crook's Corner (restaurant) =

Defunct restaurant in Chapel Hill, North Carolina, U.S.

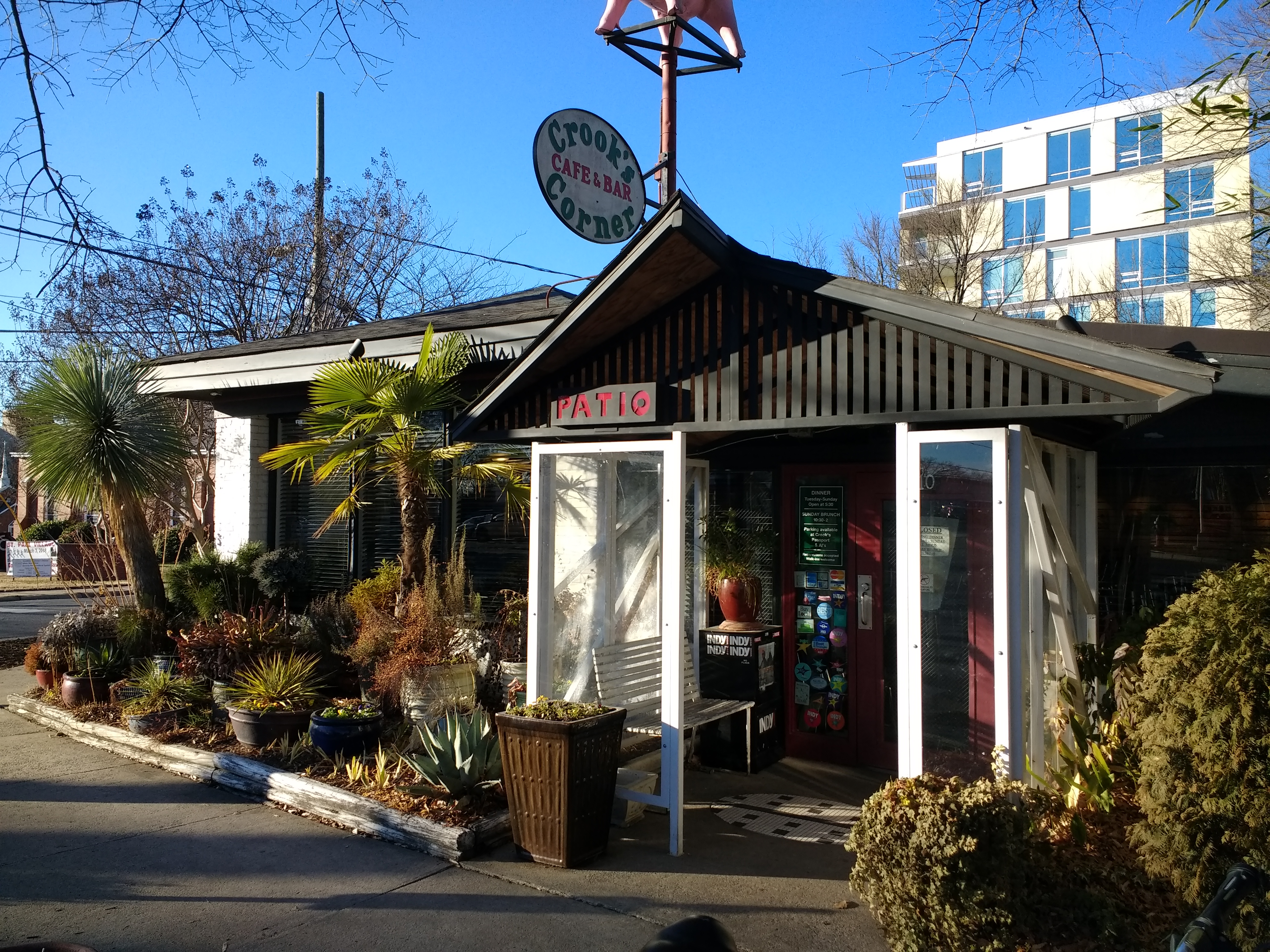
- Exterior pictured in 2018
- Interactive map of Crook's Corner

Restaurant information
- Established: 1982
- Closed: 2021
- Food type: Southern
- Location: Chapel Hill, North Carolina, United States
- Coordinates: 35.90990°N 79.06496°W

Crook's Corner was a Southern restaurant in Chapel Hill, North Carolina. The business was named one of "America's Classics" by the James Beard Foundation Awards. It opened in 1982 by Bill Neal and Gene Hamer. Neal operated the restaurant as its chef until his death in 1991. From 1993 until his retirement in 2019, Bill Smith served as the restaurant's chef. Crook's Corner closed in 2021, during the COVID-19 pandemic.

The restaurant was noted for Atlantic Beach Pie, which was created by Smith in 2011.

== See also ==
- Impact of the COVID-19 pandemic on the restaurant industry in the United States
- List of Southern restaurants
