= Leo Narducci =

American fashion designer (1932–2023)

- Born: 1932; Brockton, Massachusetts, U.S.
- Died: November 25, 2023 (aged 91); Providence, Rhode Island, U.S.
- Education: Rhode Island School of Design
- Occupation: Fashion Designer
- Years active: 1960s–2023
- Awards: Coty Award (1965)

Leo Narducci (1932 – November 25, 2023) was an American fashion designer.

== Biography ==
Born and raised in Brockton, Massachusetts, Narducci's parents owned a garment factory, where he learned to sew and developed a fascination with fashion. In 1950, he graduated from Brockton High School. After serving in the Air Force in Korea, Narducci attended the Rhode Island School of Design, where he graduated in 1960. After graduation, he moved to New York, where he initially designed for Loomtogs. In 1965 he won the Coty Award for Young Designers, and in 1967 opened his own studio.

A prominent designer during the 1960s and 1970s, his clothes were popular with celebrities like Kaye Stevens and Joyce Brothers, and in 1972 Narducci was a guest on the Mike Douglas Show. Although most well-known for his ready-to-wear collections, Narducci also designed scarfs, belts, jewelry, evening bags, Vogue patterns, and career apparel. He also produced samples in size 16 (in an era when most samples were size 8 or 10) so that the proportions would be correct for larger-sized women. He employed or mentored other prominent designers, including Bill Robinson and Stephen Sprouse.

In the early 1990s, Narducci moved back to Brockton, where he frequently put on fashion shows to benefit area organizations like Stonehill College and the Fuller Craft Museum. In 2003, he was honored with the Historic Citizen's Award by the Brockton Historical Society.

At the end of his life, Narducci resided in Providence, Rhode Island, where he designed and taught at RISD. He died there on November 25, 2023, at the age of 91. Women's Wear Daily described him as "a leading Seventh Avenue designer in the 1960s and 1970s who define affordable American sportswear as a business unto itself." Narducci was married to Robert Ferrari.
