= Edgehill, Nashville =

Neighborhood in Nashville, Tennessee, USA

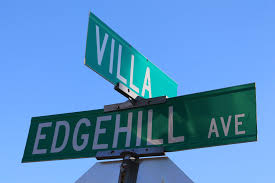
Edgehill Nashville Street Sign

Edgehill is a neighborhood in Nashville, Tennessee known for its deep African American roots, close proximity to the Downtown area, significant urban development and displacement, and demographic and economic shifts. Located a few blocks away from historic Music Row, it has a population of 2,003 residents.

== Geography and architecture ==
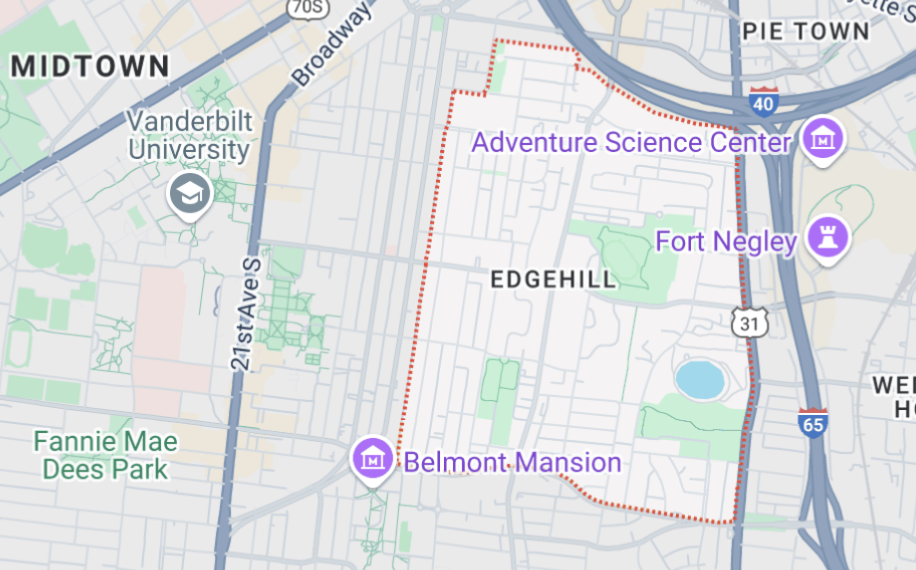
Geographical surroundings of the Edgehill Community in Nashville, TN.

Edgehill is a historic neighborhood located just south of Downtown Nashville, Tennessee. Its geographical boundaries can be defined as: Interstate 40 at the northern, 8th Avenue South/Interstate 65 at the east, Wedgewood Avenue at the south, and 16th Avenue South at the west. These borders place Edgehill adjacent to areas such as Music Row and the Gulch. Additionally, the area is in close proximity with two different universities: the freshman part of the Vanderbilt University campus, and Belmont University, which is almost immediately outside the western border of the neighborhood.

== History ==
=== Founding and early development ===
Founded by freed African Americans after the American Civil War, Edgehill, which started off as geographically situated between Fort Casino and Fort Morton, became one of Nashville’s earliest Black neighborhoods. The Union designated this area a contraband camp for fugitive slaves. Once the war ended, these fugitive slaves remained in the neighborhood.

West Edgehill was originally a white neighborhood developed between 1890 and 1930, attracting professionals due to a streetcar line. White flight to the suburbs began in the 1910s with the rise of the automobile. African Americans from Belle Meade and the Great Migration filled the area, turning Edgehill into a thriving Black community with professionals, doctors, dentists, lawyers, and locally owned businesses.

=== Rise of a thriving Black neighborhood ===
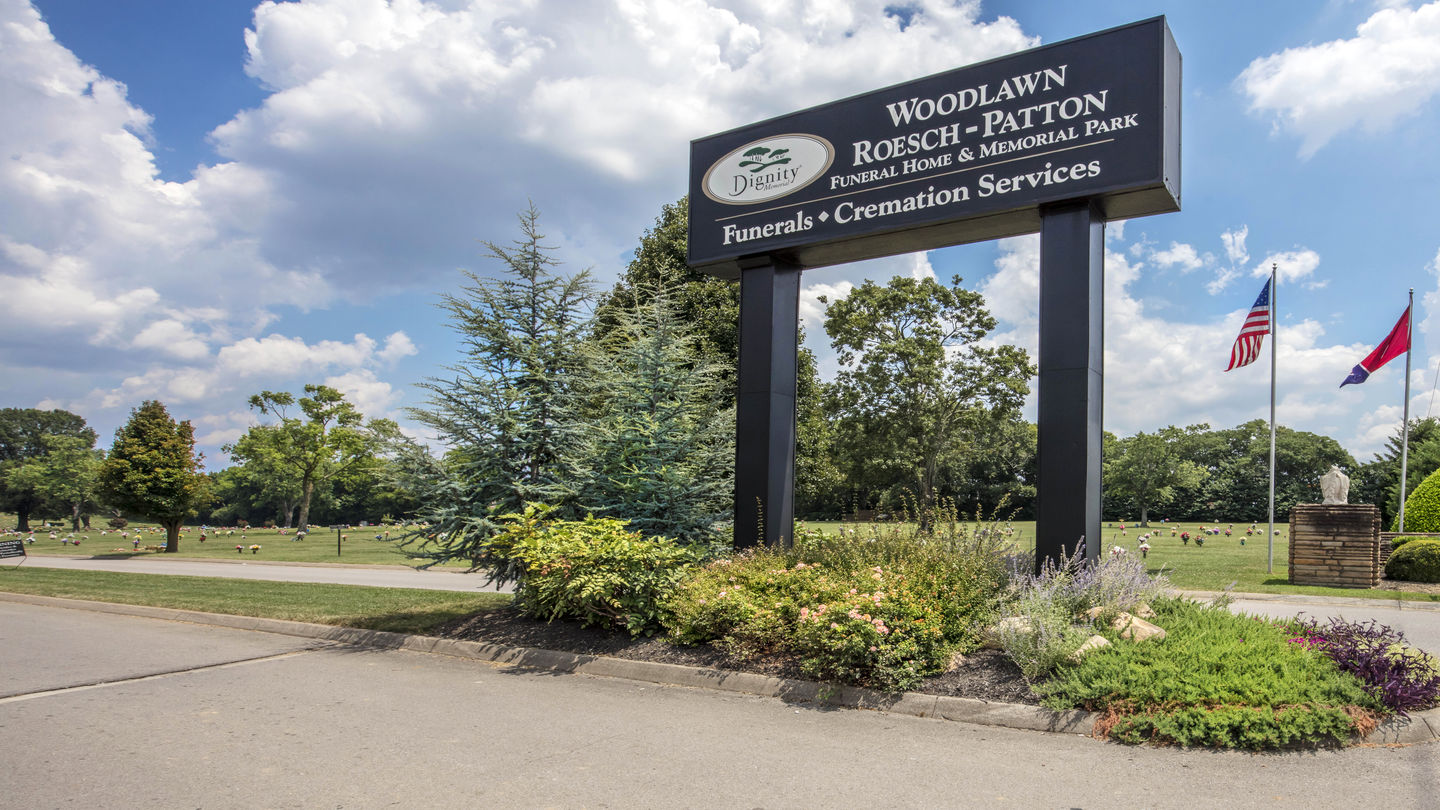
Patton's Funeral Home

By the early 20th century, businesses flourished “along South Street and 12 South Street.” There were black-owned restaurants, meat-markets, hardware stores, barbershops, and bakeries. Some of these notable businesses are “Hick’s Grocery Store, Clemons’ Drug Store, White Way Cleaners, and Patton’s Funeral Home." White Way, Patton’s Funeral Home, and several religious organizations are some of the only businesses that survived the mid-20th century Urban Renewal projects. White Way laundromat, founded by W.H. Elam and his sons in 1931, became the most renowned business in Edgehill. White Way, once one of the biggest employers in Tennessee, was even called upon by the government to help during World War II. During the war, they remained open 24/7 washing linens and military uniforms for US troops.

=== Urban renewal and displacement ===
Nashville’s Urban Renewal program of the mid-20th century ushered in large-scale demolitions of “hundreds of rental homes in the district,” thus changing the landscape of the neighborhood forever. Federal highways I-65 and I-40 became the new northern and eastern boundaries of the neighborhood, and commercial activity in the neighborhood inevitably dwindled as more roadways began being built through Edgehill. Additionally, the expansion of Belmont University led to the acquisition of various portions of the neighborhood’s land. During this period, approximately 2300 people were removed from Edgehill in order for public housing to be built.

=== Community organizing and preservation ===
During the Civil Rights movement, Reverend Bill Barnes, alongside other residents, protested a new large-scale housing development slated for the South Street area. The plans for the development were ultimately discarded. In 1967, Organized Neighbors of Edgehill (ONE) was formed as a way for residents to come together and ensure that their collective input was represented and valued. ONE was instrumental in the construction of about 120 Turnkey III homes in the neighborhood, particularly the Northside of Rose Hill. These Turnkey III homes, part of the HUD Homeownership Opportunities Program for Low-Income Families, were government-subsidized fully renovated, furnished, and ready-to-move-in homes marketed towards low-income families. Low-income families would pay rent to the Nashville Housing Authority and then would take “over a mortgage when their rent equity was converted into a down payment.”

=== Gentrification ===
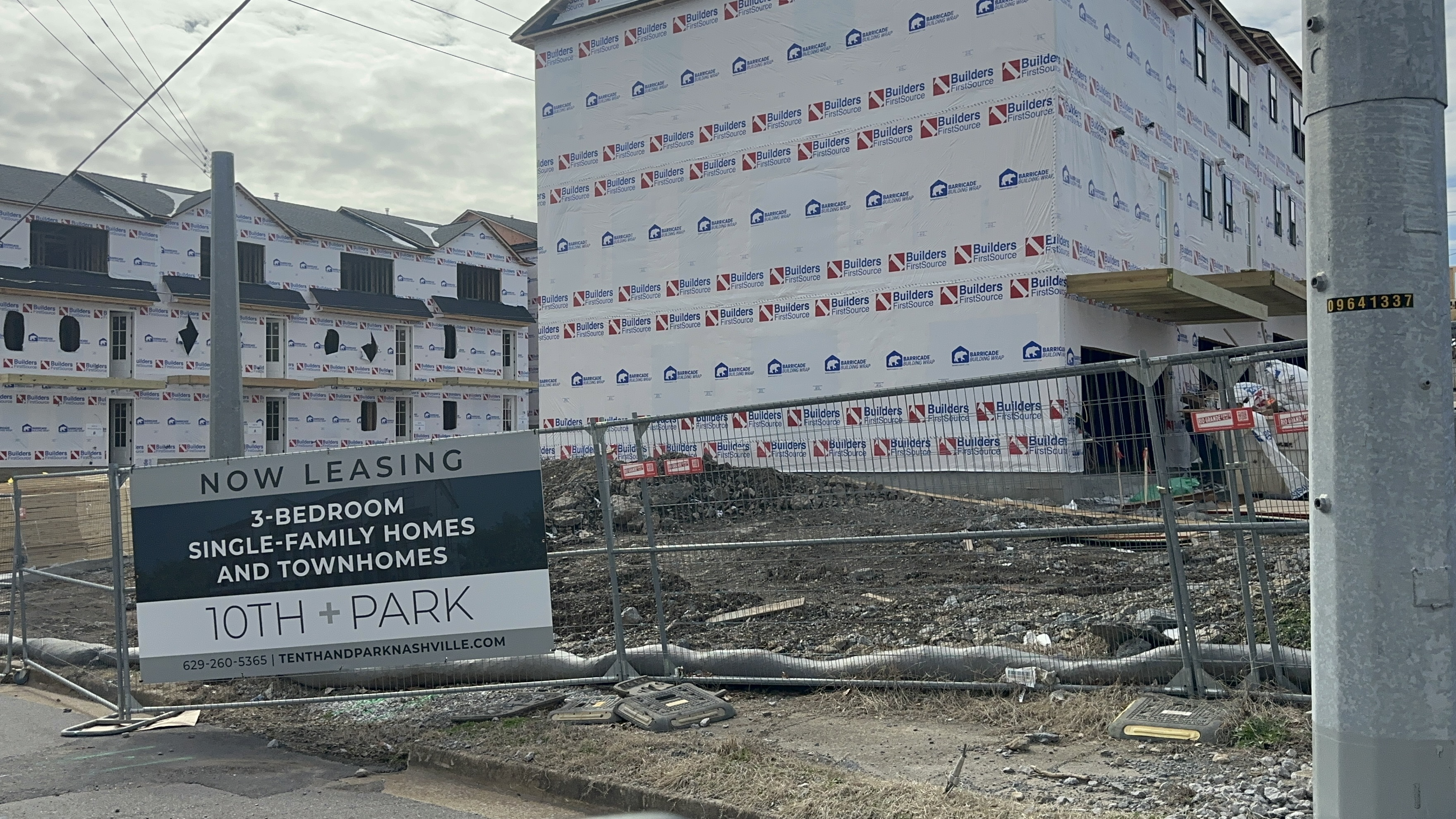
Example of Leasing of Newly Built Houses

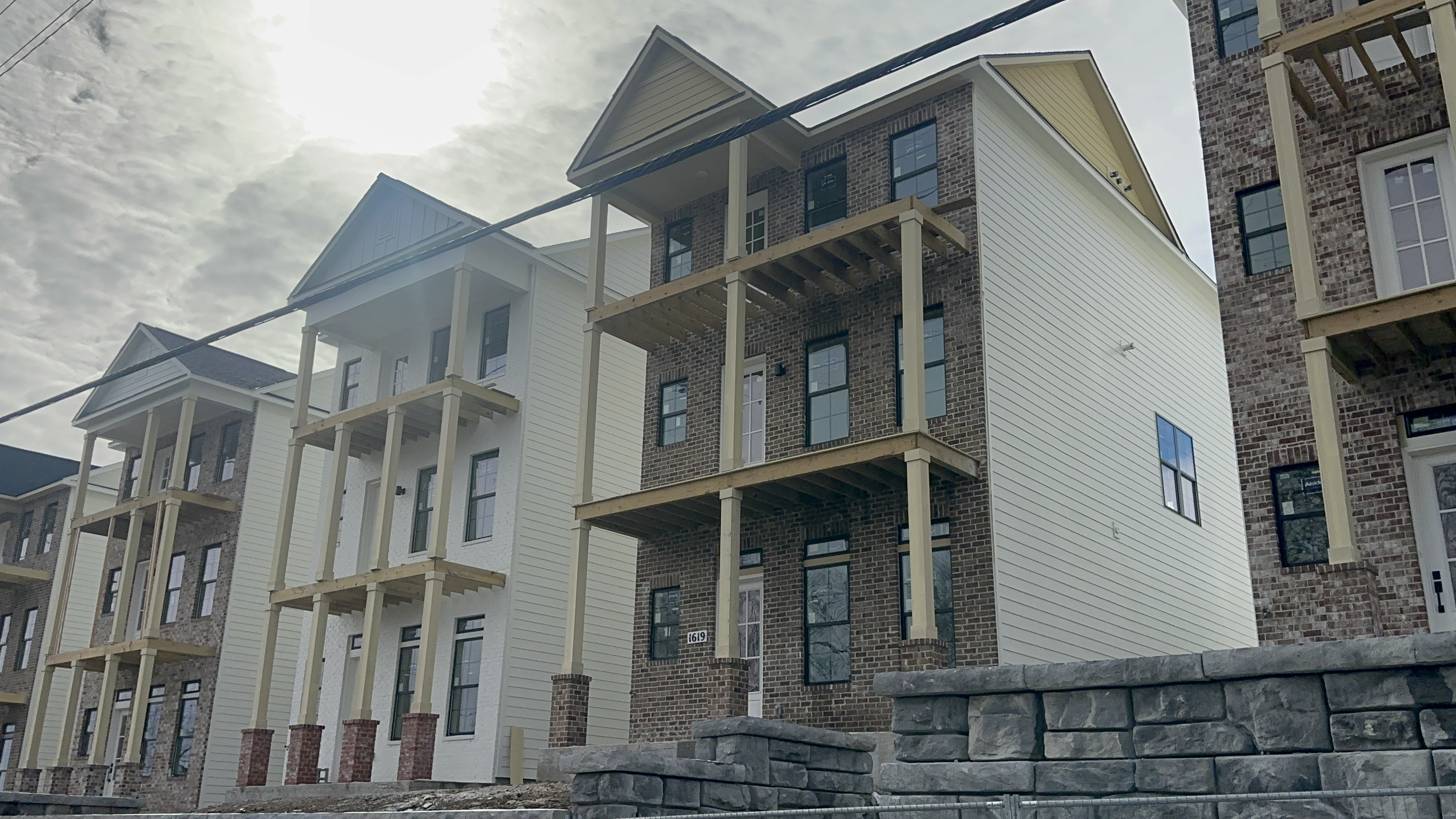
Gentrification of Edgehill

Today, Edgehill is home to approximately 6000 residents. The area continues to experience demographic and economic shifts. The area now has significantly less Turnkey III homes, which have now been replaced with modern oversized single-family homes. The median age in the neighborhood is 28 and around 40% of the population is white, thus signifying a burgeoning young white middle-class. Gentrification and displacement remain widespread, driving up home prices and making home ownership increasingly unattainable for working-class Nashvillians.

== Economy ==
Retail stores include Aēsop, Alton Lane, Billy Reid, Double RL, and Warby Parker.
