= Vishwesh Bhatt =

Indian American chef

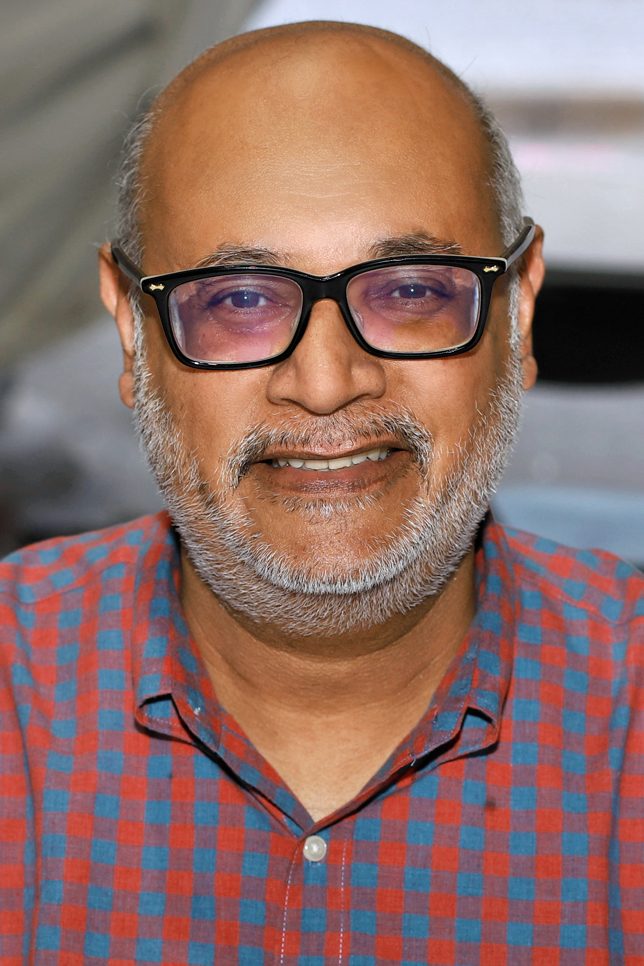
- Bhatt at the 2022 Texas Book Festival.
- Education: University of Kentucky, Johnson & Wales University
- Culinary career
- Current restaurant: Snackbar
- Award(s) won: 2019 James Beard Foundation Award, Best Chef: South

Vishwesh Bhatt is a chef based in Oxford, Mississippi.

== Early life and education ==
In 1985, Bhatt immigrated with his family from Gujarat, India to the United States at the age of 17, first settling in Austin, Texas. He studied biology and political science at the University of Kentucky and then sought a master’s in public administration at the University of Mississippi. During his time as a student, Bhatt maintained a side-business cooking for friends and colleagues. He also began working at a vegetarian cafe in Oxford.

In Mississippi he became a regular patron at John Currence's City Grocery, and he eventually joined the kitchen staff. This experience led him to pursue a culinary career, and he enrolled in the North Miami, Florida culinary school of Johnson & Wales University.

== Career ==
After culinary school, Bhatt worked in restaurants in Jackson, Mississippi and Boulder, Colorado before returning to Oxford to work for Currence again in 2001. When Currence opened a restaurant called Snackbar in 2009, Bhatt was named executive chef. Over time, Bhatt began to incorporate Indian influences into Snackbar's menu, and his cooking gained recognition. Regional and national publications highlighted Bhatt's signature okra chaat, a combination of southern fried Okra and Indian Chaat masala.

Bhatt was a semifinalist for a James Beard Award in 2011 and then a finalist in 2014. He was a finalist again in 2015, 2016, 2017, and 2018, before winning the James Beard title of Best Chef in the South in 2019.

In 2022, he released his cookbook, I Am From Here, which focuses on Southern cuisine and declares his status as an authentic Southern chef. He won a 2023 James Beard Award for this cookbook, in the U.S. Foodways category.
