= Stephen Sprouse =

American fashion designer and artist (1953–2004)

- Born: September 12, 1953; Dayton, Ohio, U.S.
- Died: March 4, 2004 (aged 50); New York City, U.S.
- Labels: SS83, SS84, SS85 (1983–1985), Stephen Sprouse, Sprouse, S (1987–1988), Stephen Sprouse for Bergdorf Goodman (1992–1993), Stephen Sprouse for Barneys New York (1995), Sprouse™/Andy Warhol(c) (1998), Stephen Sprouse™ (1998–1999), Sprouse™ (2002–Target)
- Awards: Council of Fashion Designers of America (CFDA)

Stephen Sprouse (September 12, 1953 – March 4, 2004) was an American fashion designer and artist. He is credited with pioneering the 1980s mix of "uptown sophistication in clothing with a downtown punk and pop sensibility".

Sprouse received the Council of Fashion Designers of America (CFDA) award for Best New Designer in 1984. The following year he filed for bankruptcy. Sprouse struggled to maintain his label after making another investment and seeing some success. He continued throughout the 1980s and 1990s, working with such luminaries as Andy Warhol and Keith Haring. In 2000, he collaborated with Marc Jacobs to produce designs for Louis Vuitton.

== Life and career ==
=== Early life and education ===
Stephen Sprouse was born in Dayton, Ohio on September 12, 1953, the oldest son of Norbert and Joanne Sprouse, where his father was stationed at an Air Force base. When sprouse was two, his family relocated to Columbus, Indiana, where his father successfully pursued a manufacturing career. They lived lavishly in a white columned mansion reminiscent of the film Gone With the Wind, according to a friend.

Sprouse's artistic skill first surfaced when he was a child. He was a bashful youngster who always kept a pen in his hand to sketch. Sprouse was only assertive when he was holding a pen or pencil, and then only to the point where teachers called him the Art Supervisor.

When Sprouse was 12 years old, he first met fashion designer Norman Norell, thanks to his father showing his portfolio to someone at the Art Institute of Chicago. His father sent him to New York to meet Norell and fashion designer Bill Blass. Blass then employed Sprouse as a summer apprentice when he was 14. Sprouse later recalled to fashion editor Amy Spindler, "He was cool, my dad ... I mean, this was in Indiana. He could have beat me up if I didn't play football, and he didn't."

When Sprouse started attending the Rhode Island School of Design in 1971, an instructor referred to him as "the designer of the future." When Sprouse started college, his interests shifted from fashion to art, and three months later, he left for New York. According to Sprouse's close friend Charles G. Beyer, he was fascinated by pop artist Andy Warhol and the Factory scene. "He loved Edie Sedgwick. For him, she was like the sixties Kate Moss," said Beyer.

== Career ==
=== Early career ===
He received permission to work in New York while still a student, working with fashion designer Leo Narducci, whom he had previously worked with during a summer in New York when he was 16. Narducci phoned fashion designer George Halley and he remarked that Sprouse's work resembled fashion designer Halston's. When questioned if he had ever met Halston, Sprouse said he hadn't met him before, but he had respected him and believed his work was excellent. A meeting was arranged and after learning that he didn't enjoy college, Halston offered him a position as an assistant. He thus left school and relocated to New York.

Sprouse along with Dennis Christopher and Bill Dugan made up a trio of assistants known as the Halstonettes. He gained knowledge about luxury and form from Halston. He also got to know several of the prominent people in society at the time. A sort of salon, Halston's boutique on East 68th Street served as a rendezvous place for New York society. Sprouse convinced Halston to trim the bottoms of the dresses a few days before a fashion show, resulting in the 'Skimp' of 1974, a reinvention of the minidress that contrasted with the normally elongated silhouette of that era.

After leaving Halston in 1975, Sprouse lived in a loft in the Bowery with singer Debbie Harry, who would frequently feed his cats. Blondie was a new band that Harry and her boyfriend, guitarist Chris Stein, were starting to get recognition for at New York nightclubs CBGB and Max's Kansas City. Sprouse had enjoyed dressing up Halston's favourite model Karen Bjornson, who epitomized the stylish blonde from the Upper East Side. Sprouse made clothing out of torn tights, T-shirts, and items he found on the streets, turning Harry into a sort of "Bowery Bjornson."

=== Stephen Sprouse collections ===
Sprouse launched himself as a commercial fashion designer when he competed in a fashion show contest of young designers in the spring of 1983 (at the suggestion of photographer and friend Steven Meisel), sponsored by the Polaroid Corporation. Based upon the favorable editorial reaction he received, he soon after formed his first company, Stephen Sprouse, Inc., and set up a showroom and production space at 57th Street and Fifth Avenue, launching his initial commercial collections for retail (prior to this, production of his early 1983 apparel, done on a small scale, was produced by Dianne Phelp's company "Triad").

With financial backing provided by his parents, Sprouse soon formed an in-house production staff for the small runway collection he showed in his silver-painted showroom (in homage Andy Warhol's Silver Factory loft of the sixties) in December 1983. The show garnered much attention and favorable reviews (notably from The New York Times Fashion Editor, John Duka).

Stephen Sprouse's initial Day-Glo bright, sixties-inspired, graffiti-printed fashion collections for men and women caught the attention of fashion editors, store buyers, and fashionistas, garnering much media coverage. His initial collections (1983–1985) were huge critical hits, sold at only the "best" stores. His 1983 collections were sold exclusively at Bergdorf Goodman and Henri Bendel in New York City on a small scale. Subsequently, Sprouse received the CFDA award for Best New Designer in 1984.

To much surprise in the fashion and retail communities, Sprouse declared bankruptcy in June 1985. Sprouse cited production, late deliveries, and financial problems in an interview with Women's Wear Daily shortly after he closed his initial business.

Sprouse informally showed a Fall 1985 collection to buyers and the press at his new showroom in Union Square on Broadway - the last location of Andy Warhol's infamous "Factory" lofts. A runway presentation at Club USA in NYC was initially planned (and largely promoted) for its grand opening. Subsequently, the show was cancelled; a Stephen Sprouse Incorporated representative stated at the time that the show was cancelled due to the company relocating to their new Union Square location. The apparel shown were "finished samples."

Sprouse referred to his Fall 1985 collection as being "more hippie weird" and early seventies-inspired, with bell-bottom trousers, psychedelic prints, and maxi skirts, but the company lacked the funds and staff to produce the apparel.

Sprouse was initially noted by fashion magazines and retailers for using high-quality, expensive, custom-dyed fabrics (his woolens were largely sourced by the high-end Italian textile house Agnona). Sprouse personally did the graffiti that adorned many of his very early, expensive garments (1983, early 1984), which added to their desirability.

In September 1987, with financial backing from high-end furniture manufacturer Knoll International (then known as GFI/General Felt Industries), Sprouse opened a three-level store on Wooster Street in New York City. A second smaller store was opened in Los Angeles in the spring of 1988 at the Beverly Center shopping complex. He partly abandoned his signature sixties silhouettes, instead drawing inspiration from the mid-seventies London-based punk rock scene.

Following Warhol's death, Sprouse received permission from his estate to use Warhol's Camouflage screenprint as a textile design. For his Fall 1987 collection, he created a Day-Glo camouflage sequin minidress, and for his Spring 1988 collection, he reinterpreted the camouflage motif in fluorescent orange, pink, white, and pale yellow for skirt-and-jacket ensembles. He also displayed three of Warhol's original Camouflage prints in his showroom.

For his Fall 1988 "Signature" collection, he collaborated with artist Keith Haring to create several abstract prints of Jesus with graffiti, and Haring's "squibbles." His company, CSI ({Andrew} Cogan Sprouse Incorporated) also wholesaled the various collections ("Stephen Sprouse," "Sprouse," and "S") to retailers (commencing with his Spring 1988 collection), but he lost his financial backing due to poor sales and production/quality issues, closing again in December 1988, shortly after the company shipped their "Holiday" line.

Sprouse worked extensively with the band Duran Duran in the late 1980s, designing the clothes for their 1989 tour for the album Big Thing, as well as the cover for their greatest hits album Decade of the same year. Additionally, he styled and dressed Billy Idol in the early 1990s for Idol's "comeback" (which garnered little interest).

=== Brand collaborations ===
In 1992, Sprouse designed an exclusive men's and women's "capsule collection" (i.e.: 32 pieces in whole) for Bergdorf Goodman, dubbed "CyberPunk," which featured Velcro in lieu of traditional buttons. Sprouse (again) largely sourced custom made textiles from Agnona for his fall 1992 collection. The production of the collection was done entirely on a couture level, leading to extremely high-priced garments (e.g.: $500 for a pair of men's nylon underwear - that being one of the lowest priced items available). Bergdorf Goodman sold the line for two seasons (Fall 1992 & Spring 1993), with very limited success, despite wide media coverage, and featuring Sprouse's garments in their window displays.

Sprouse showed a collection ("CyberGlitter") at Club USA in NYC for Fall 1993, but it never went into full production, despite orders being placed from retail buyers.

In 1995, Barneys New York handled the production of an exclusive women's spring/summer line. Vogue magazine featured the moderately priced garments in its pages, but it sold poorly. That same year, Sprouse also served as the costume curator for the new Rock and Roll Hall of Fame in Cleveland, and designed the staff's uniforms.

In 1996, Sprouse designed the logo and cover for New York Glam outfit Psychotica's self-titled album, released under American records. In 1998, with full production and backing from Italian manufacturer Staff International, he was briefly back in business, but the clothes sold poorly and were largely ignored by the fashion press and retailers that adored him in the 1980s.

The graffiti logo bags he designed in collaboration with Marc Jacobs for Louis Vuitton in 2001 made the fashion world take notice once again.

In 2002, he created a vast collection of men's and women's apparel, home accessories, sports gear, etc. for the Target discount chain (dubbed "AmericaLand") - mostly rendered in a graffiti patriotic motif.

In 2003, Sprouse collaborated with fashion brand Diesel on a take over of its Union Square Store for September's New York Fashion Week. As part of the collaboration, Sprouse designed a series of limited edition jeans, T-shirts and hats, and made a complete makeover of the Diesel store, which meant adding his renowned Day-Glo design to windows, interiors, and outer building exteriors. At the launch of the event Diesel's founder and President, Renzo Rosso, explained the project as "first and foremost a tribute that we wish to pay to one of the most groundbreaking and far-reaching artists of our time, someone who went beyond categorizations, means of expressions, and gender- a common approach at Diesel."

== Death ==
Sprouse died of heart failure at the age of 50 on March 4, 2004, at St. Luke's-Roosevelt Hospital Center in New York City, after a closely guarded diagnosis of lung cancer a year before.

== Legacy ==
For both Fall 2006 and 2008, Marc Jacobs utilized Sprouse's 1987 graffiti leopard images for handbags, shoes, and scarves for Louis Vuitton, which sold-out instantly.

A book on the career of Sprouse, The Stephen Sprouse Book, by Roger Padilha and Mauricio Padilha, with a foreword by Tama Janowitz, was released by Rizzoli in January 2009.

In July 2022, an exhibition titled "Stephen Sprouse: Rock, Art, Fashion" opened at the Indianapolis Museum of Art.
