= Officine Générale =

French clothing brand

Officine Générale is a French clothing brand founded in 2012 by Pierre Mahéo. Based in Saint-Germain-des-Prés, Paris, the company produces men's and women's clothing using French, British and Italian fabrics. Although called a “lifestyle brand” by Complex magazine, Mahéo has stated: “Officine Générale isn’t in the fashion industry. It isn’t fashion. Our point of view is different: beautiful normality.” His father was an oyster farmer, and his grandfather was a tailor.

The brand has 200 points of sale and 14 stores, including seven in Paris, one in London and four in the United States. Its flagship store is located at 6 Rue du Dragon, just off of Boulevard Saint-Germain.

== See also ==
- rag & bone
- Billy Reid
