= John Currence =

American chef

John Currence is an American chef based in Oxford, Mississippi. As of 2019 he owns four restaurants in the city of Oxford: City Grocery, Big Bad Breakfast, Bourè, and Snackbar in addition to a catering business, The Main Event. Currence also owns numerous Big Bad Breakfast locations in Alabama, Florida, Tennessee and South Carolina. He won a James Beard Award in 2009 for the category of Best Chef, South, at City Grocery. He later also participated in the third season of the Bravo television competition Top Chef Masters.

== Early life ==
John Currence was born and raised in the affluent Uptown/Carrollton neighborhood of New Orleans, Louisiana. The majority of his childhood was spent in New Orleans, but his mother took Currence and his brother out of elementary school for long weekends to travel around Europe. After graduating from Isidore Newman School, Currence attended Hampden-Sydney College and the University of North Carolina. One of his part-time jobs while at the university was as a dishwasher at Bill Neal's Crook's Corner restaurant.

His professional career began under Bill Neal at his Chapel Hill, North Carolina restaurant, Crooks Corner. In 1989, Currence returned to New Orleans to be sous chef at Gautreau's, co-owned by Larkin Selman.

== Career ==
=== Restaurants ===
Currence owns four restaurants in Oxford, Mississippi: City Grocery, Bourè, Snackbar, and Big Bad Breakfast. He expanded Big Bad Breakfast to include locations in Birmingham, AL, Homewood, AL, Greystone, AL, Vestavia Hills, AL, Cahaba Heights, AL, Tuscaloosa, AL, Mobile, AL, Montgomery, AL, Florence, AL, Madison, AL, Pelham, AL, Destin, FL, Inlet Beach, FL, Brentwood, TN, Chattanooga, TN, Franklin, TN, two Memphis, TN locations, Murfreesboro, TN, Nashville, TN, South Pittsburg, TN, Spring Hill, TN, Durham, NC, Charleston, SC, Mt. Pleasant, SC, Conway, AR, two locations in Little Rock, AR and three locations in Louisville, KY. He had a location in Buckhead, GA that has since closed. He also owns The Main Event, a catering business based in Oxford for in-house and off-site catering. According to Vogue, "[y]ou can't visit Oxford without hearing someone sing the praises of Chef John Currence."

City Grocery was Currence's first restaurant, with a Southern and traditional Creole French menu, opened in 1992, and has been in Oxford Courthouse Square since 1996. The New York Times recommended "its rowdy upstairs bar and elegant dining below". It was named one of the "South's Best Bars" by Southern Living in 2013. In fall 1999, it won its first of several Wine Spectator Awards of Excellence.

Big Bad Breakfast started in Oxford in 2008, but later spawned additional locations in Florida, Alabama, Tennessee, Arkansas, Kentucky and South Carolina. It has received recognition from publications like The Culture Trip, which named it one of the best diners in the South by in 2016, The Daily Meal, Serious Eats, and Travel and Leisure.

Snackbar opened in 2009, and its chef Vishwesh Bhatt won the James Beard Award for Best Chef in the South in 2019.

Currence bought barbecue restaurant Lamar Lounge in 2012. It received attention from publications like Sports Illustrated and Garden & Gun, but closed in 2016. It reopened as Fat Eddie's, an American Italian restaurant, which itself closed in 2017.

=== TV appearances ===
Currence was featured as a contestant on season 3 of the reality television cooking competition Top Chef Masters. He won the second week of the competition, "Everything Old is New Again", but was knocked out in the third episode. Bravo TV, the network on which Top Chef Masters is hosted, released John Currence's pre competition interview.

Currence joined Andrew Zimmern on the Travel Channel's Bizarre Foods, exploring The Blues Trail to try unusual BLT sandwiches, including one made with testicles.

He has also appeared on an episode of Anthony Bourdain's No Reservations: Parts Unknown, about the Mississippi Delta and southern culture.

In 2009 he was featured on the CBS Early Show during a segment called "A Chef on a Shoestring". The segment featured how to cook a three-course meal for four for under $35.

=== Publications ===
Currence has published the books, Pickles, Pigs & Whiskey: Recipes from My Three Favorite Food Groups and Then Some, Big Bad Breakfast: The Most Important Book of the Day and Tailgreat: How to Crush It at Tailgating. He was a contributor to the cookbook Wild Abundance: Ritual, Revelry & Recipes of the South's Finest Hunting Clubs. Pickles, Pigs & Whiskey was featured or reviewed by The New York Times Book Review, which called it "a culinary rebel yell in a new key", as well as The Washington Post, Eater, and others. Big Bad Breakfast was featured as the Los Angeles Times Cookbook of the Week.

== Awards and recognition ==
John Currence was the recipient of the James Beard Award in 2009 for Best Chef South. The Southern Documentary Project filmed the announcement and his acceptance speech. The Mississippi Restaurant Association awarded him the Restaurateur of the Year and Chef of the Year awards. In 2008, Currence won The Great American Seafood Cookoff hosted annually in New Orleans, Louisiana. The Southern Foodways Alliance awarded Currence the Guardian of Tradition award in 2006, and he was awarded the Mississippi State Tourism Investment Award in 2015. In 2014 the Southern Independent Booksellers Alliance (SIBA) awarded Currence Best Cookbook Award for Pickles, Pigs & Whiskey.

== Philanthropy and activism ==
Currence was featured in The New York Times for launching the Big Gay Mississippi Welcome Table, a protest against Governor Phil Bryant's signing of the anti-gay House Bill 1523.
