= Alabama Chanin =

American fashion designer

Natalie "Alabama" Chanin is an American fashion designer from Florence, Alabama. From 1976 until its closure in 2005, Tee-Jays Manufacturing was one of the largest employers in the Florence textile industry. Chanin's business now operates as a clothing manufacturer on the grounds of the former Tee-Jays company and is now a part of the zero-waste fashion movement. Her design company uses organic cotton fabric in their designs. Chanin's "open source" philosophy means that patterns and techniques for some of her garments are openly available through books and workshops.

== Early life and education ==
Natalie "Alabama" Chanin was born and raised in Florence, Alabama. At the age of ten, she and her mom moved to Chattanooga. She has a degree in Environmental Design with a focus on industrial and craft-based textiles from North Carolina State University. After graduation, Chanin worked in the junior sportswear industry on New York's Seventh Avenue, before moving abroad. For the next decade, she worked as a stylist, costume designer, and filmmaker, all while traveling the globe.

== Inspiration ==
Chanin draws inspiration from her academic studies, including ideas about color as espoused by Josef and Anni Albers, the Bauhaus artists who fled Nazi Germany for Asheville, North Carolina, in 1933 to teach at Black Mountain College. Southern literature and stories have always been a love of hers. Growing up, her grandmother sewed every garment her children wore as well as Chanin's, while also gardening and cooking fresh food. This led to her naturally making a community of her own through Alabama Chanin.

== Career ==
=== Project Alabama ===
Chanin came back to her hometown of Florence, Alabama, in 2000 and developed an idea to create a small line of two-hundred unique t-shirts. Chanin decided her hometown was the only place able to envision her idea of reconstructing vintage shirts with detailed stitches, like that of a quilting stitch from the Depression era. This started the development of Project Alabama, which consisted of a twenty-two-minute documentary called Stitch, the two-hundred limited hand-sewn and hand-mended T-shirts, and a hand-made catalog. After taking the collection to New York City to showcase at the Hotel Chelsea, it was immediately recognized by buyers from department stores including Barneys New York. With its successful launch, Project Alabama became a full production facility. In 2006, Chanin separated from her original business partner, while production moved abroad to India.

=== Alabama Chanin ===
The making of the brand Alabama Chanin is the culmination of what Project Alabama symbolized. Alabama Chanin is rooted in the tenets of the Slow Design movement. Known for its "eco-chic" influences, Natalie launched the Alabama Chanin line in 2006. Tied with the slow design movement, Chanin is also known for being at the forefront of the zero-waste movement by trying to implement sustainable solutions through her brand. Historical evidence reveals indigenous people, Egyptian kaftans, and Pre-industrial society consciously tried to make garments without any excess waste. In the past, textiles were treated preciously as they were known for being scarce, which lead to their consciousness of waste. Whereas, after the Industrial Revolution, technological developments were able to increase production and lower costs, allowing for textile waste to be less of a concern. All the garments are made with either organic or recycled materials by the hand of local artisans. The company employs local women aged twenty to seventy, to help sew one-of-a-kind, handmade garments, preserving the region's dwindling tradition of quilting. Any waste fabric is used as an embellishment, patchwork, or appliqué as a way of using the re-manufacturing process. From low-value waste garments, the new products created here have value imbued through the skills of the workers and the story told through the label.

==== Production operations ====
Chanin originally sourced materials solely from local thrift stores, but with increased orders, the company began relying on bulk shipments from Salvation Army. Pieces are made from 100% organic cotton, often sewn by hand through a group of artisans using a cottage industry method of operation. Certified organic cotton jersey is sourced from select Texas farmers, then sent to North Carolina to be spun into thread, and then knitted in South Carolina before either returning to North Carolina to be dyed. If the garments are being dyed with indigo, they go directly back to Florence where they are hand-dyed in a small dye house. At Building 14, Chanin's factory in Florence, workers cut, paint, and prepare for our artisans here in Florence. While machine-made garments are sewn in-house, hand-sewn garments are made out-of-house by select artisans. Every garment is numbered and signed by the artisan who constructs it. At an Alabama Chanin do-it-yourself women's sewing seminar at Blackberry Farm resort in Eastern Tennessee, Chanin stated, "During an average production run, Building 14 (Chanin's factory in Florence) can produce around 120 garments a day vs. the 120,000 dozen that were manufactured a day by Tee Jays, the company that once occupied the space". While garments can range from $248 to over $2,000, the company's goal is not to cater specifically to the wealthy. It is more about honest transparency of garment production and the value of quality handiwork and sweatshop-free clothing manufacturing. In 2015, she expanded the machine-made garments line to include a home goods collection.

=== Factory + Cafe ===
In 2018, Chanin opened Factory + Café in Florence which includes a café that has a menu developed by Yewande Komolafe who is advising the café.

== Collaborations ==
Billy Reid and Alabama Chanin Cotton Project, 2012

- Chanin teamed up with fellow neighbor and Florence, Alabama, designer to plant a seven-acre field of cotton in Northwest Alabama. The project took two years of learning and slow anticipation that has come full circle with their limited run of 100% Alabama grown and sewn organic Cotton Project Tees, sold in stores and online by both Billy Reid and Alabama Chanin.

Center for the Study of Southern Culture at the University of Mississippi, 2016

- Alabama Chanin led a study to serve as an oral history of sewing in the region

== Awards ==
- One out of Ten Companies Chosen by the Council of Fashion Designers of America/Vogue Fashion Fund, 2005
- Finalist, Cooper Hewitt National Design Awards for Fashion, 2005
- Winner, Council of Fashion Designers in America/Lexus Eco-Fashion Challenge, 2013

== Published works ==
- Alabama Stitch Book, 2008
- Alabama Studio Style, 2010
- Alabama Studio Sewing + Design: A Guide to Hand-Sewing an Alabama Chanin Wardrobe, 2012
- Alabama Studio Sewing Patterns: A Guide to Customizing a Hand-Stitched Alabama Chanin Wardrobe, 2015
- The Geometry of Hand-Sewing, 2017
