= Atlantic Beach pie =

Lemon curd pie

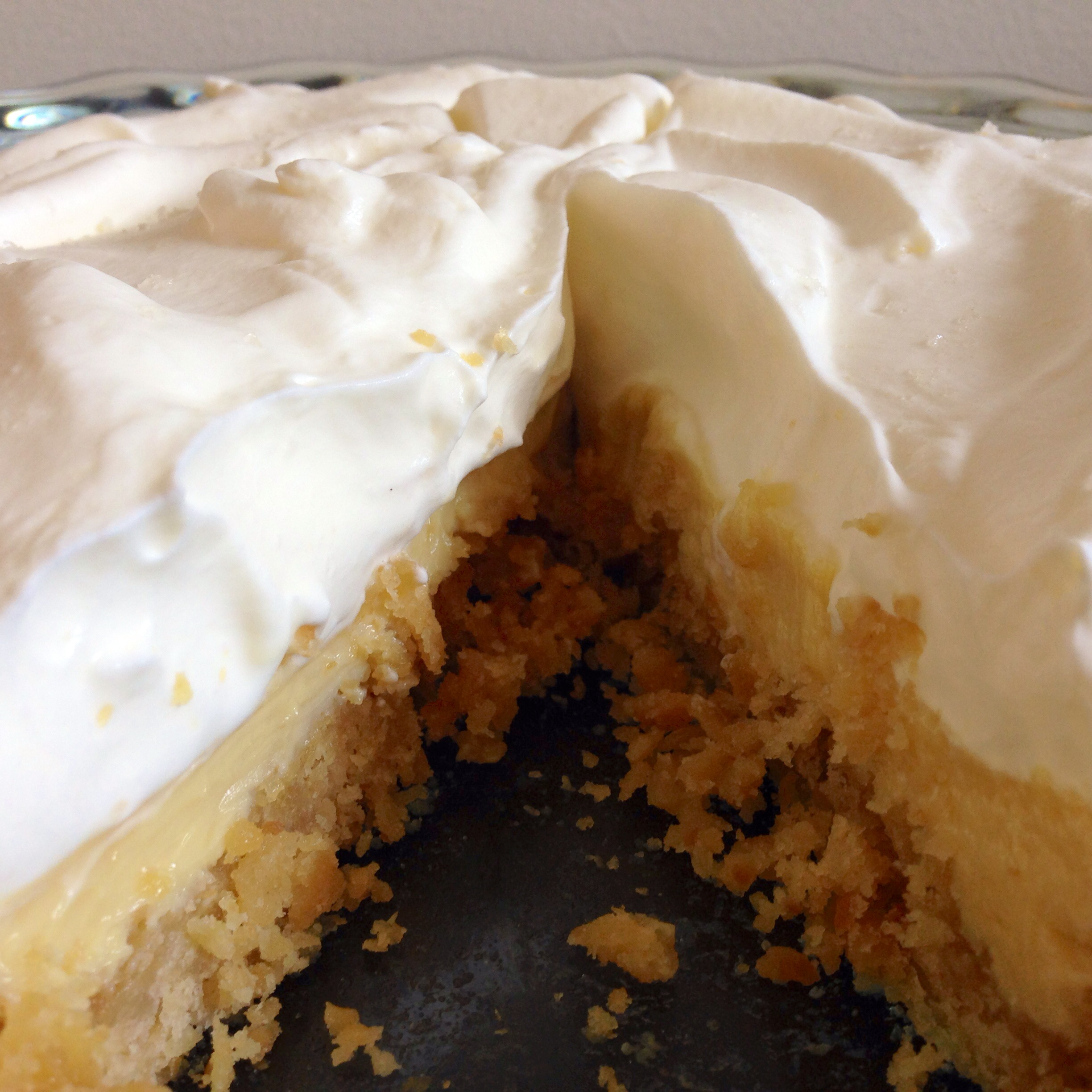
- Type: Pie
- Course: Dessert
- Place of origin: United States
- Region or state: North Carolina
- Created by: Bill Smith
- Invented: 2011

Atlantic Beach pie is a type of lemon curd pie which uses a saltine crust and whipped cream topping sprinkled with salt.

== Development ==
The recipe was developed by Bill Smith, then chef at Chapel Hill, North Carolina, restaurant Crook's Corner, who had as a child in the 1950s and 1960s vacationed in Atlantic Beach, North Carolina, where local lore held that only citrus-based desserts could be safely eaten after eating seafood. When asked to develop a dessert for a Southern Foodways Alliance event in 2011, he developed a pie inspired by the lemon meringue pies typically offered in area seafood restaurants. Unlike lemon meringue pies, which typically use a shortcrust pastry base and are topped with meringue, Smith's recipe calls for a saltine cracker crust and a whipped cream topping and is garnished with finishing salt.

=== Origin of the name ===
Before being added to the Crook's Corner menu, the pie needed a name. According to Bill Smith himself, he "sort of offhandedly" named the dessert after the nearby beach town of Atlantic Beach.

== Preparation and ingredients ==
The pie uses a crust containing saltines, butter, and sugar and a curd containing lemons or limes, condensed milk, and egg yolks. The curd is topped with a sweetened whipped cream and then finishing salt and/or lemon zest. The pie is notable for the speed and ease with which it can be made.

Preparation
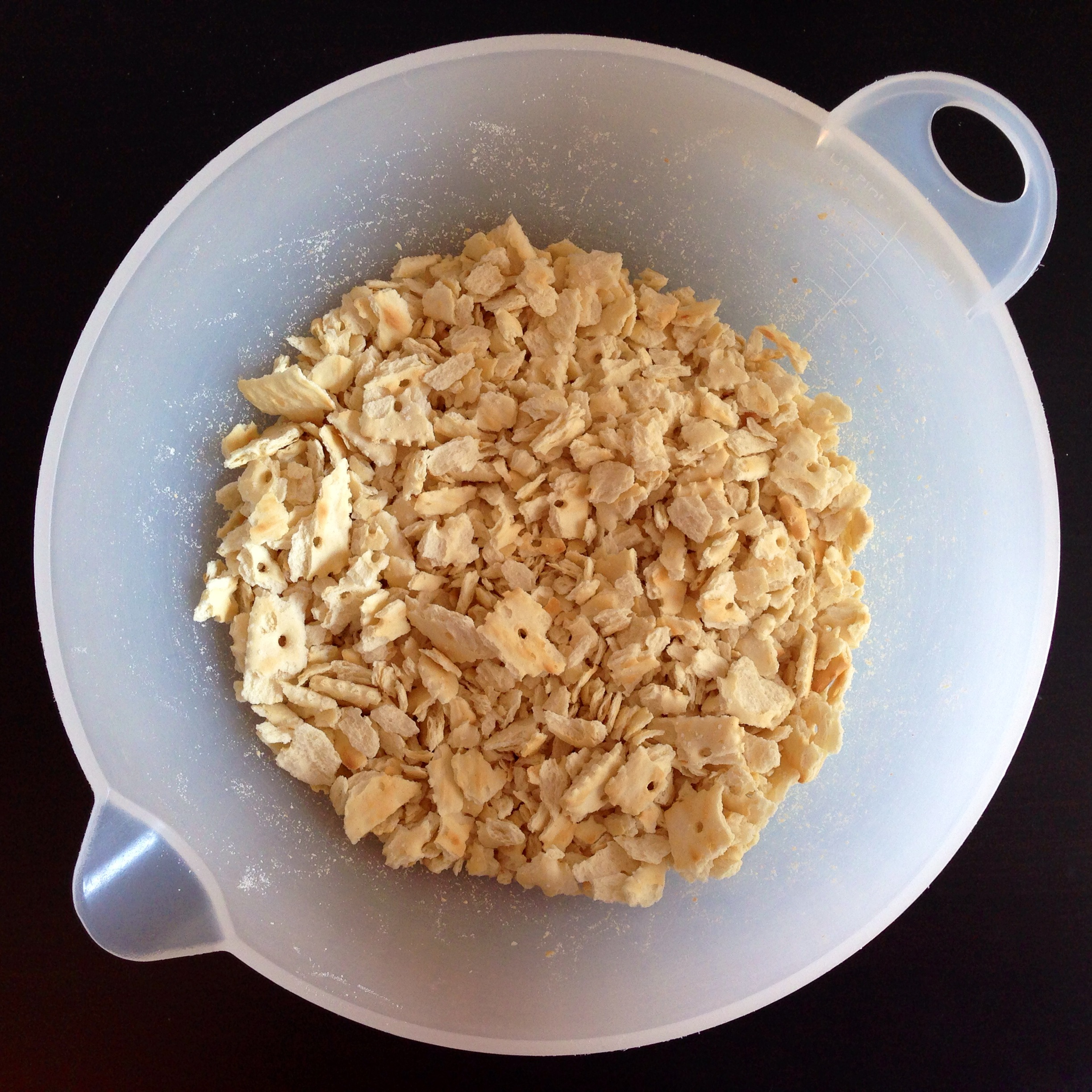
Saltines are crumbled

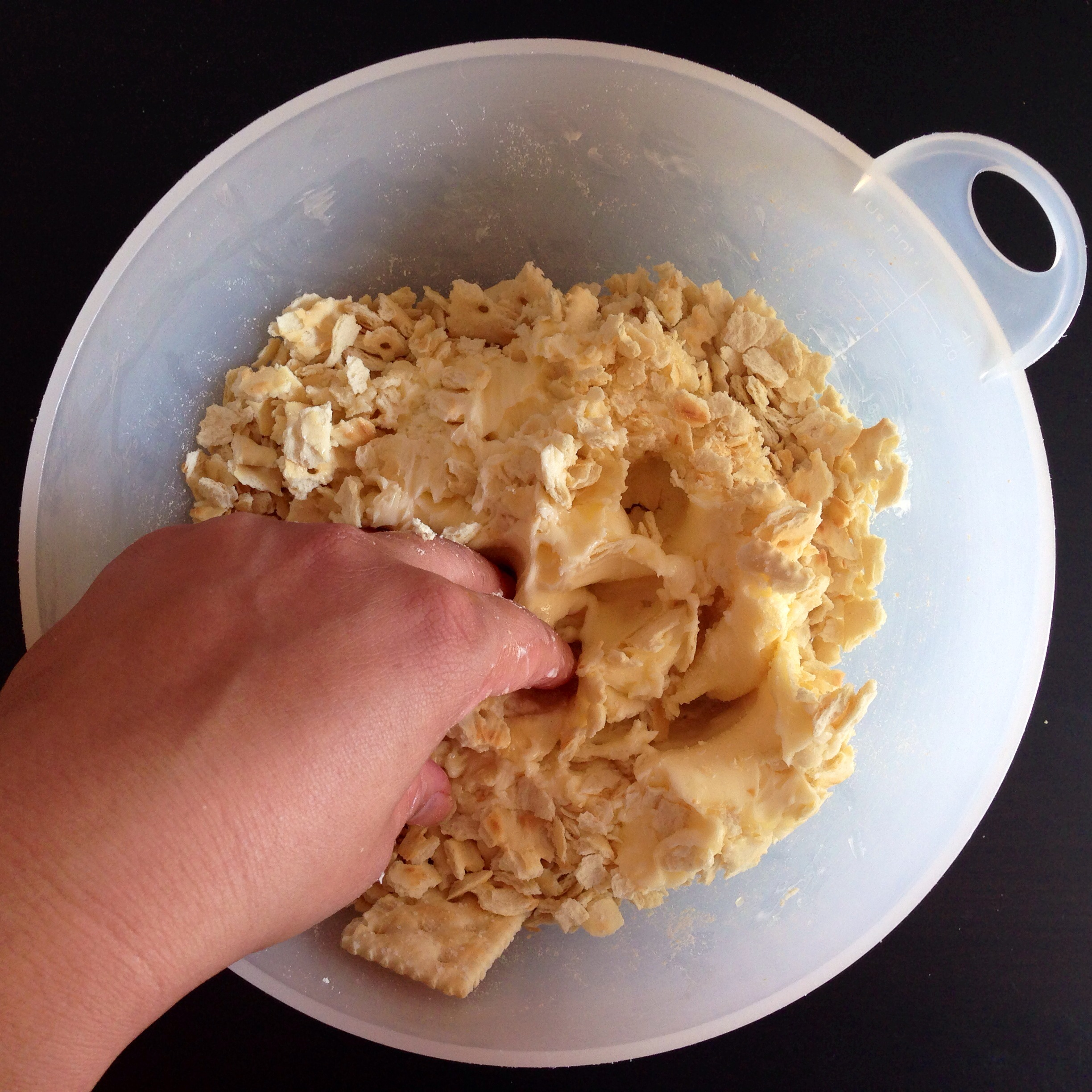
Butter is worked in

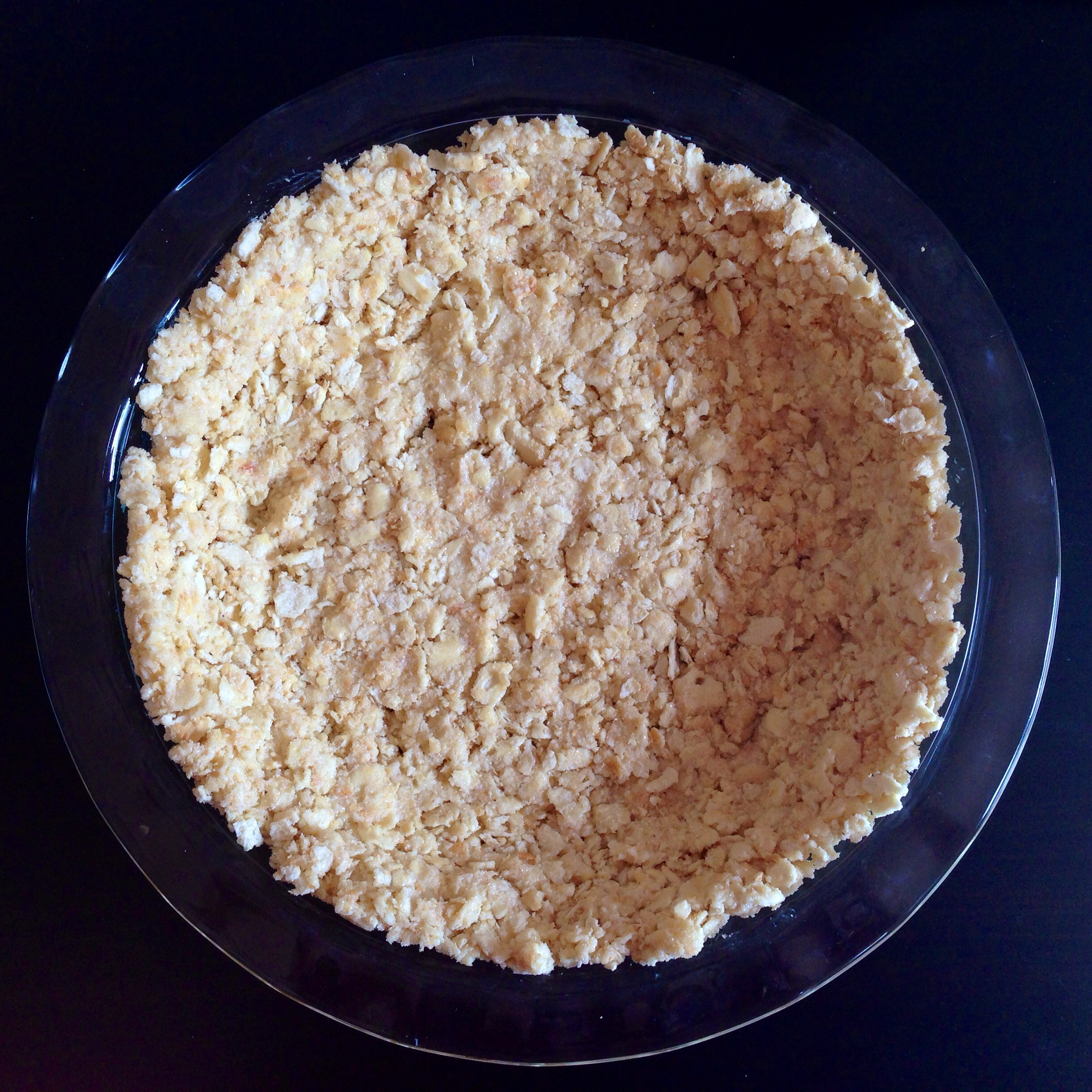
Saltines and butter are pressed into a pie pan

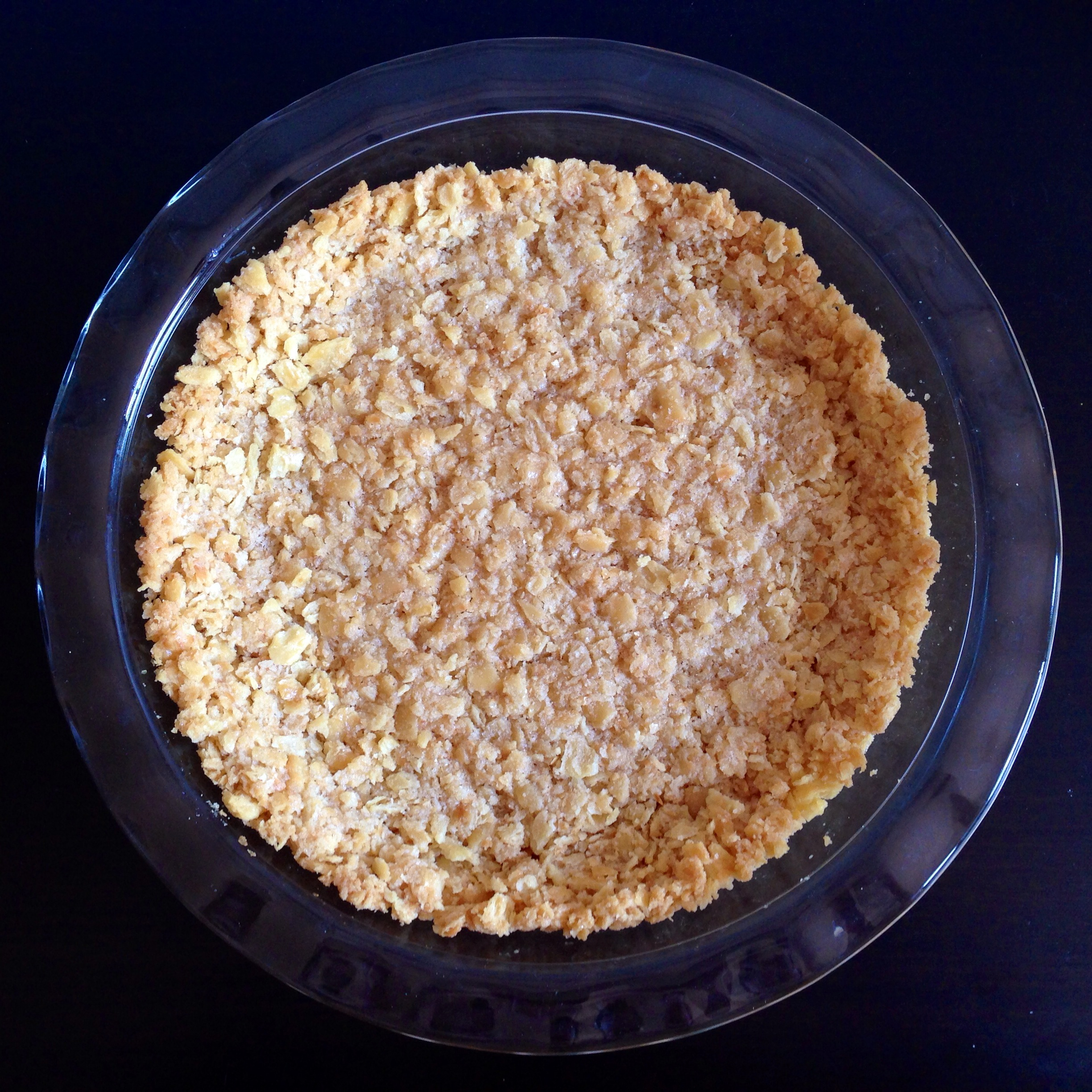
The crust is baked and allowed to cool

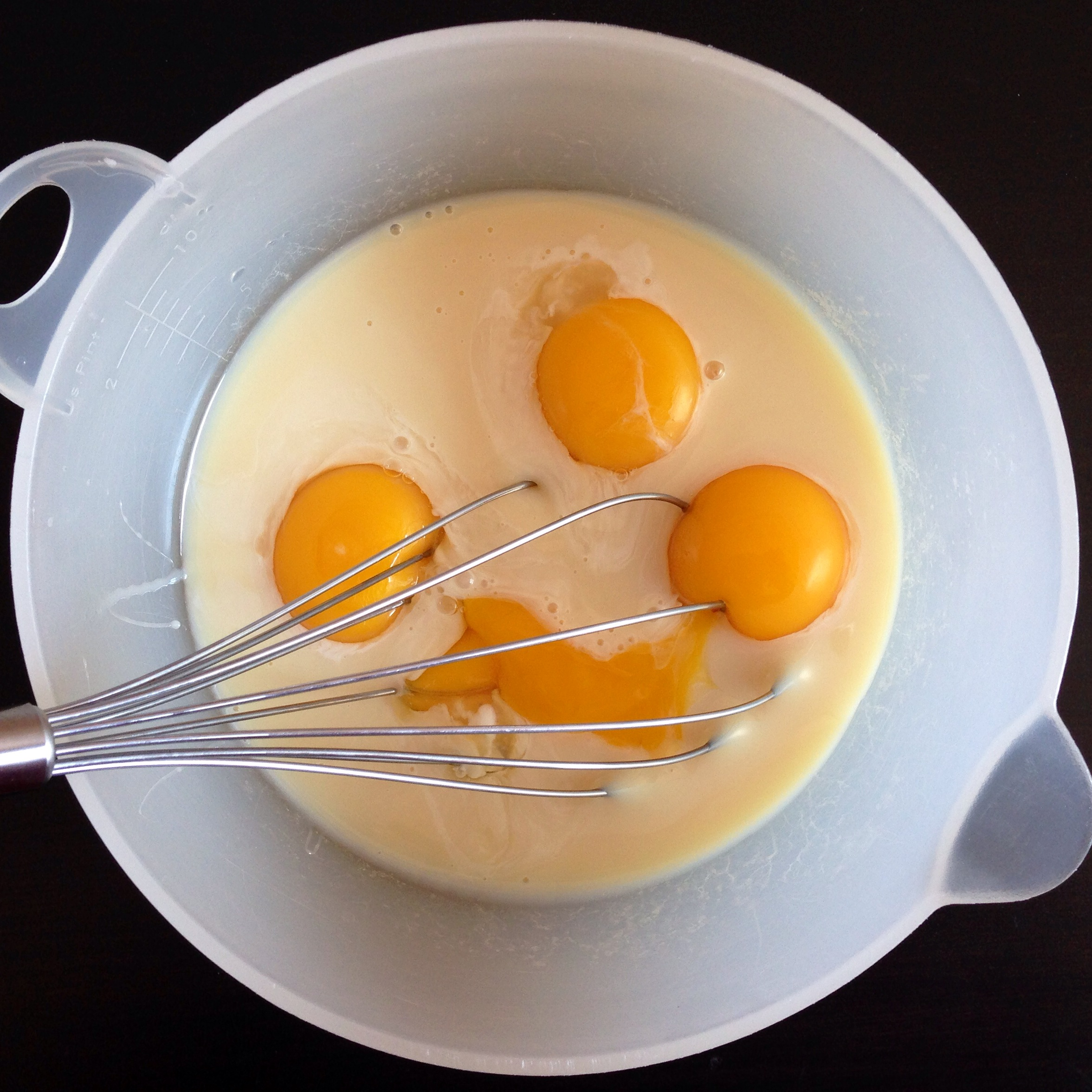
Egg yolks are added to condensed milk and lemon juice

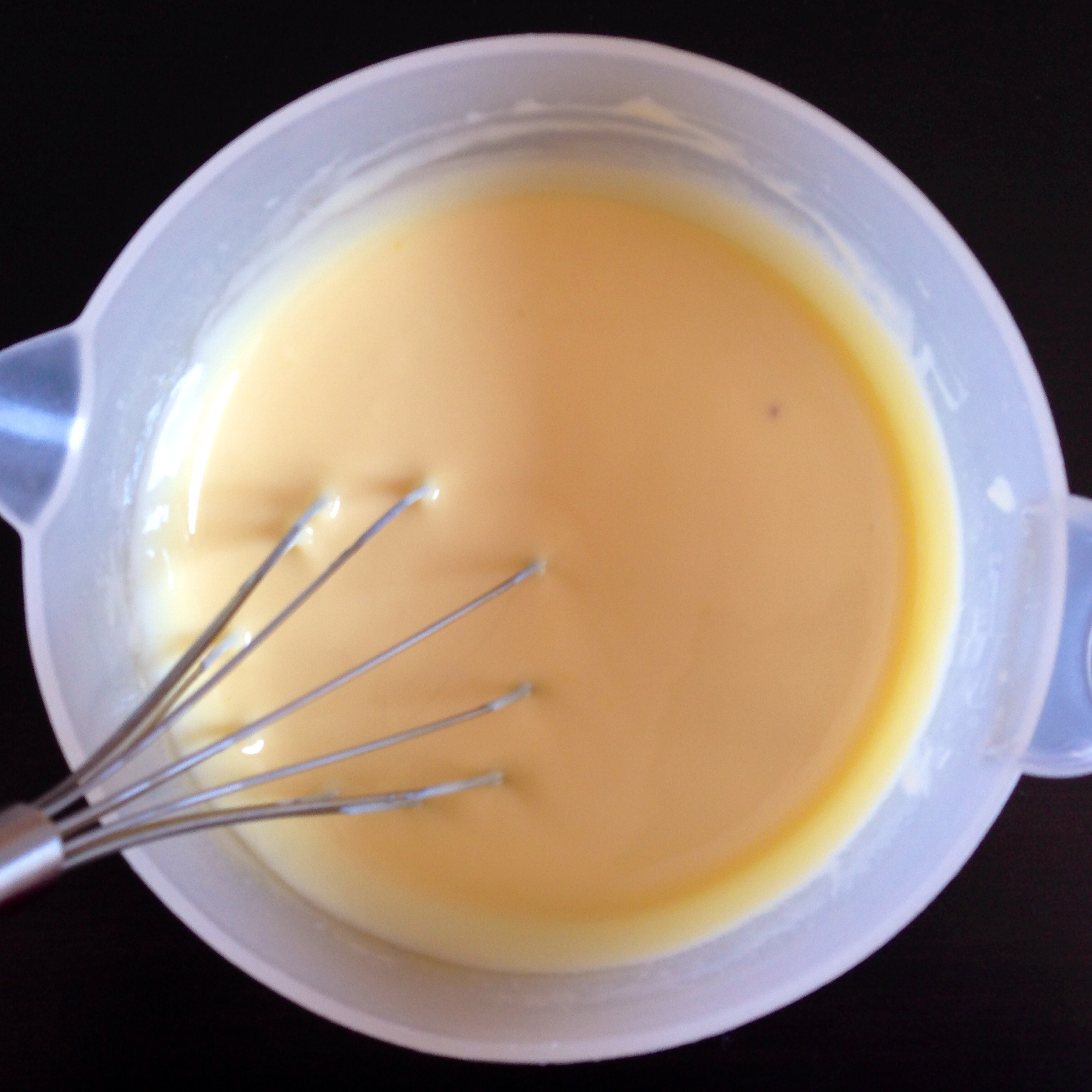
Mixture is whipped into a custard

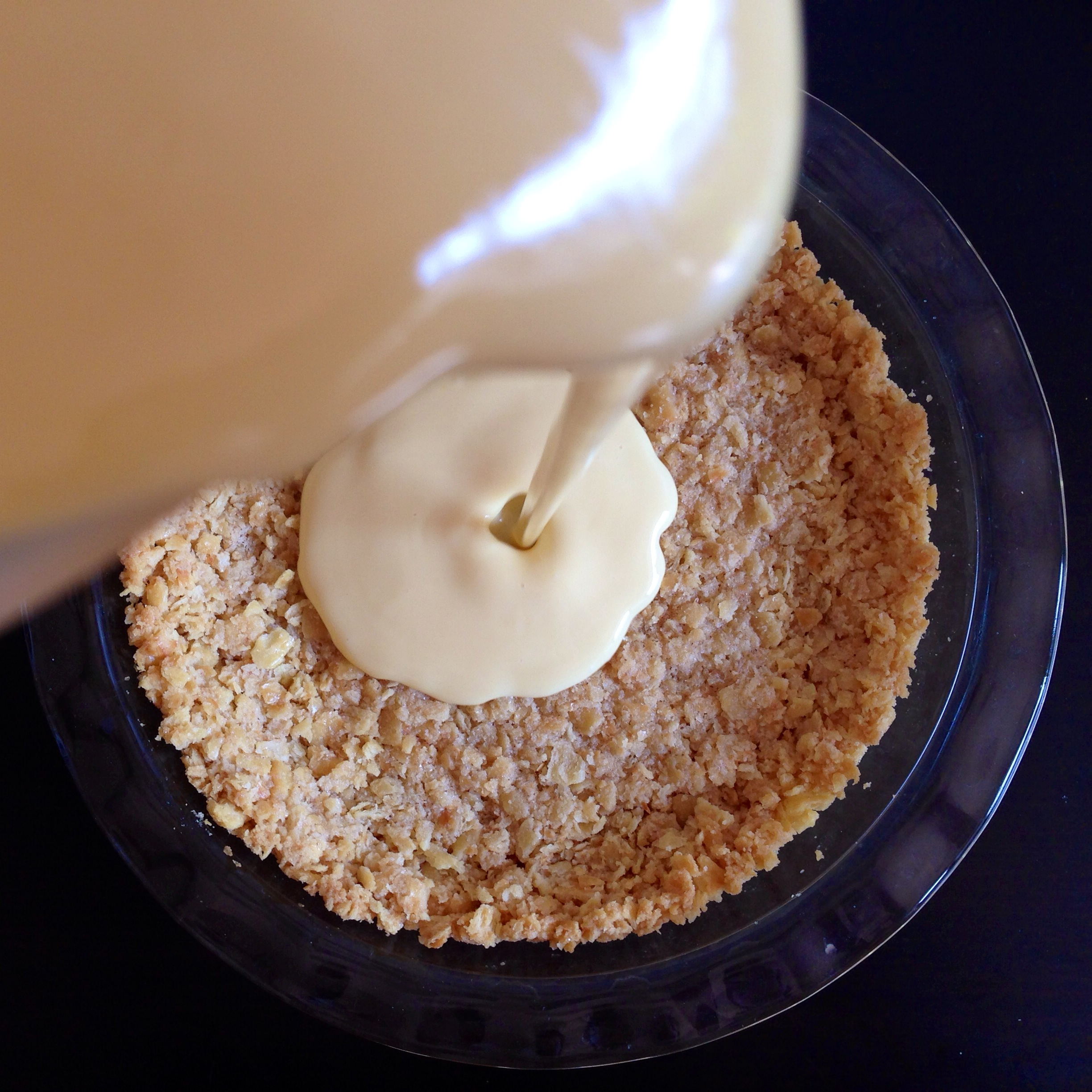
Custard is poured into crust and baked

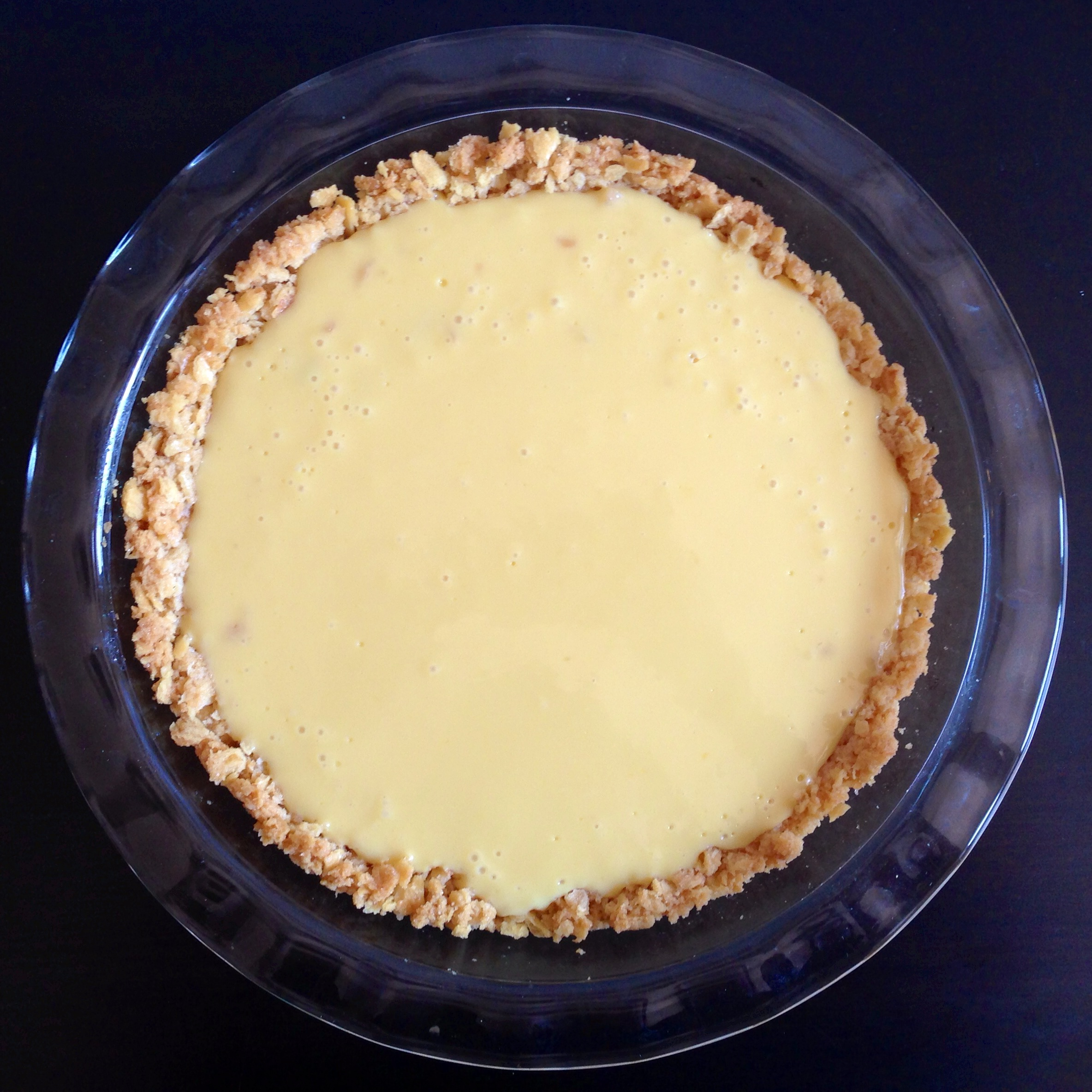
Baked custard in crust

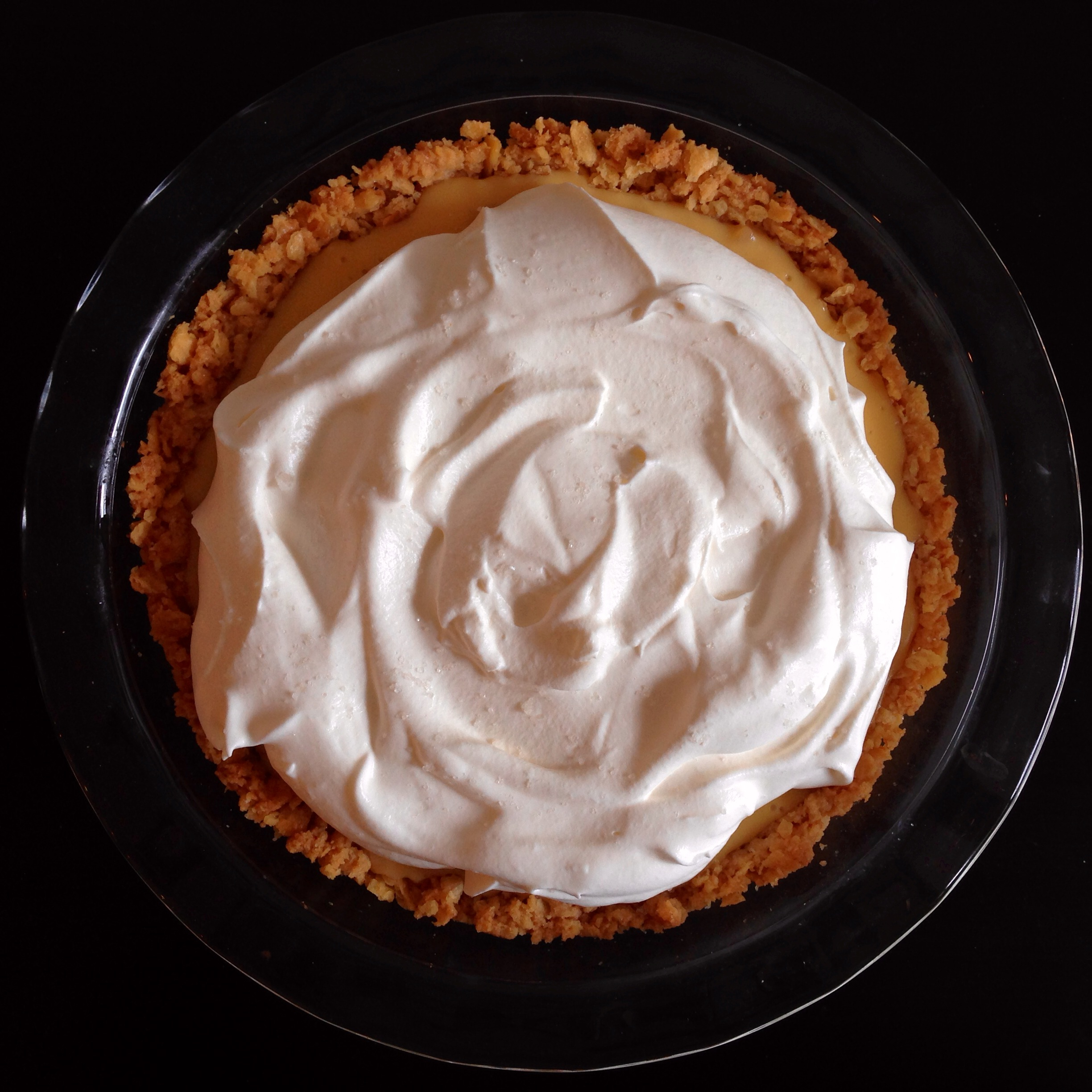
Finished pie, topped with whipped cream

== Reception ==
Southern Living called the pie "the best dish of summer".

== See also ==
- List of lemon dishes
- List of pies
