= André Mack =

American sommelier and winemaker

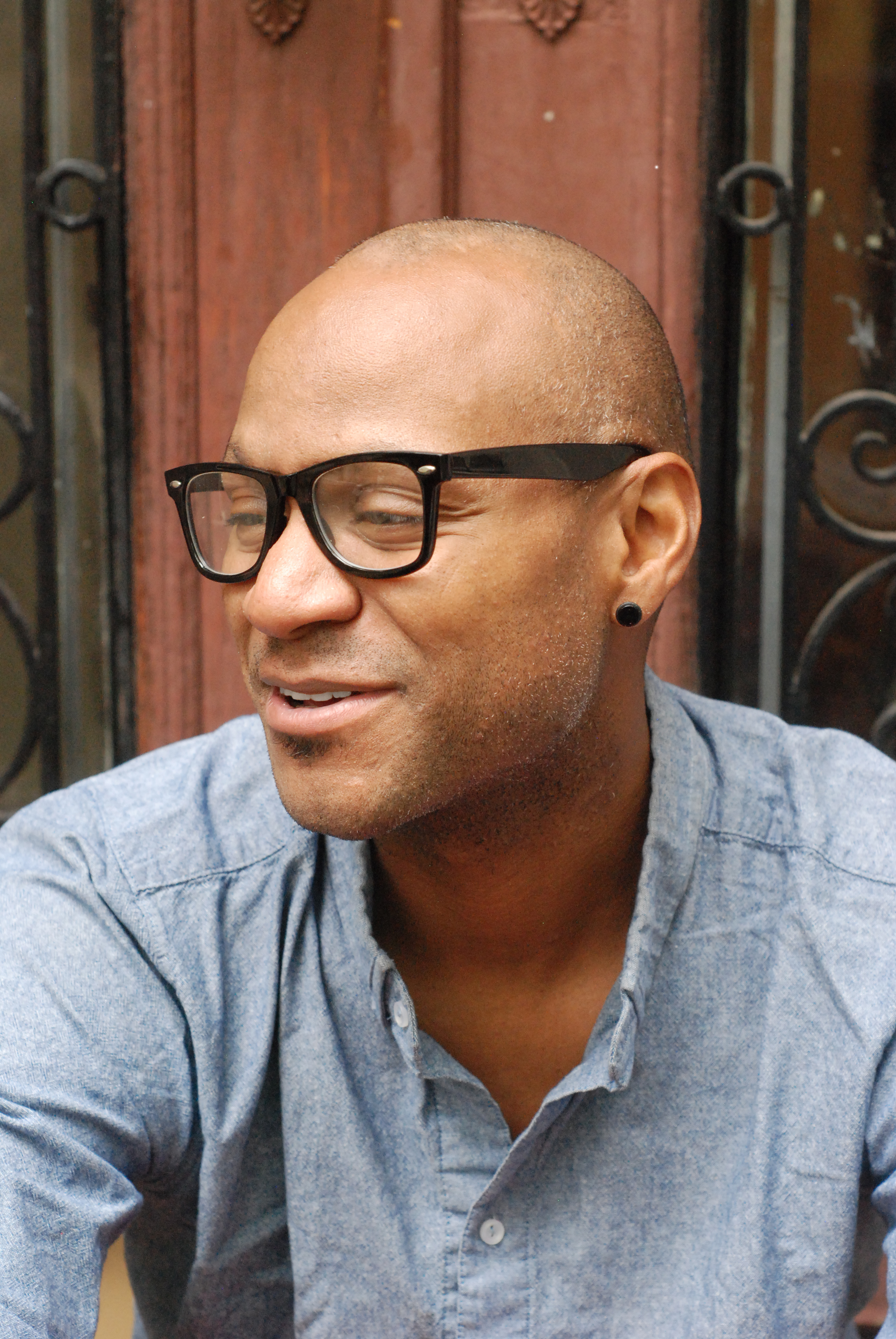
- Mack in 2016
- Born: 1972 or 1973 (age 51–52)
- Occupations: Sommelier; winemaker
- Website: www.andremack.com

André Hueston Mack is an American sommelier and winemaker.

== Career ==
Mack worked for two years in the finance industry before transitioning into the restaurant industry. He started as a dishwasher at Darden Restaurants and left as a corporate service trainer after six years. He then worked at The Palm in San Antonio before working as the founding sommelier at Bohanan's in San Antonio. He later worked at the Thomas Keller restaurants The French Laundry in Yountville, California and Per Se in New York, New York.

In 2007, he founded the company Maison Noir (formerly known as Mouton Noir). Mack leases 13 vineyards in the Willamette Valley in Oregon which produce wine under his popular culture-inspired labels. In 2020 Mack opened & Sons in Brooklyn, New York, a wine and ham bar.

=== Writing ===
Mack's wine lists have been listed in The Huffington Post, The Wall Street Journal, and Black Enterprise.

== Awards ==
In 2003, Mack won the Chaîne des Rôtisseurs Young Sommeliers Competition. In 2007, he received The Network Journal's 40-Under-Forty Achievement Award.

== See also ==
- List of wine personalities
