= Alton Lane =

American menswear company

Alton Lane is an American menswear company founded in 2009 by Colin Hunter and Peyton Jenkins, graduates of the University of Virginia. Alton Lane offers modern bespoke suits, blazers, trousers, tuxedos, and shirts. The company is headquartered in Richmond, Virginia, and its suits are produced in Germany, Italy, and Thailand. Alton lane uses a combination of 3D body scanners and hand measurements to produce fully custom clothing.

== History ==
Hunter and Jenkins quit their jobs as a management consultant and a history teacher/commercial realtor, respectively, and cashed in their life savings to fund the business.

In 2015, Alton Lane raised $7.5 million to fund expansion.

== Showrooms ==
Alton Lane has showrooms in New York City, Boston, Washington D.C., Richmond, Virginia Dallas, Chicago, and San Francisco, with future locations being built in Nashville, Savannah, Georgia, and Charlottesville, Virginia.

Alton Lane operates on an appointment-only basis. Each client is measured using a 3D scanner. Clients select a style and fabric for their garment, and the measurements are sent to the manufacturer in Massachusetts where the clothing is made. In approximately 4–6 weeks, the garments are delivered directly to the showroom and the client is invited back to the showroom for a personal fitting.
