= Bill Neal (chef) =

American chef and restaurateur

Bill Neal (1950–1991) was a chef and an early advocate of Southern regional cookery.

== Life ==
=== Early life and La Résidence ===
Bill Neal was born in 1950. His parents, farmers, raised him near Gaffney, South Carolina, where they maintained fruit and vegetable gardens, reared dairy cattle, chickens, and pigs, and processed their own meats. After high school, he studied at Duke University. On a visit to New Orleans in 1970, he attended restaurants serving Louisiana Creole cuisine. The experience was influential on Neal, particularly Antoine's, for the restaurant's fusions of ingredients and theatrical elements. In 1971, Neal graduated from Duke, and began work as a high school English teacher which he continued for two years, and briefly spent a period in New York City pursuing postgraduate education.

Moreton Neal was Neal's wife. Together, they had a child, whom Neal stayed with during the night when his wife worked. On those nights, Neal worked through Mastering the Art of French Cooking, cooking each of its recipes; Moreton later credited this with Neal gaining the self-belief that he could become a professional chef. In the mid-1970s, R.B. Fitch of Fearrington Village, North Carolina, offered Moreton and Bill an opportunity to rent a house where they could open a restaurant. La Résidence opened on May 9, 1976, serving a mix of French and New Orleans fare, with the Neals living upstairs. The menu changed often, and the restaurant served as the start of the career of the chef Bill Smith. It did not make a lot of money. In 1982, the Neals divorced, with Moreton staying on at La Résidence.

=== Crook's Corner ===
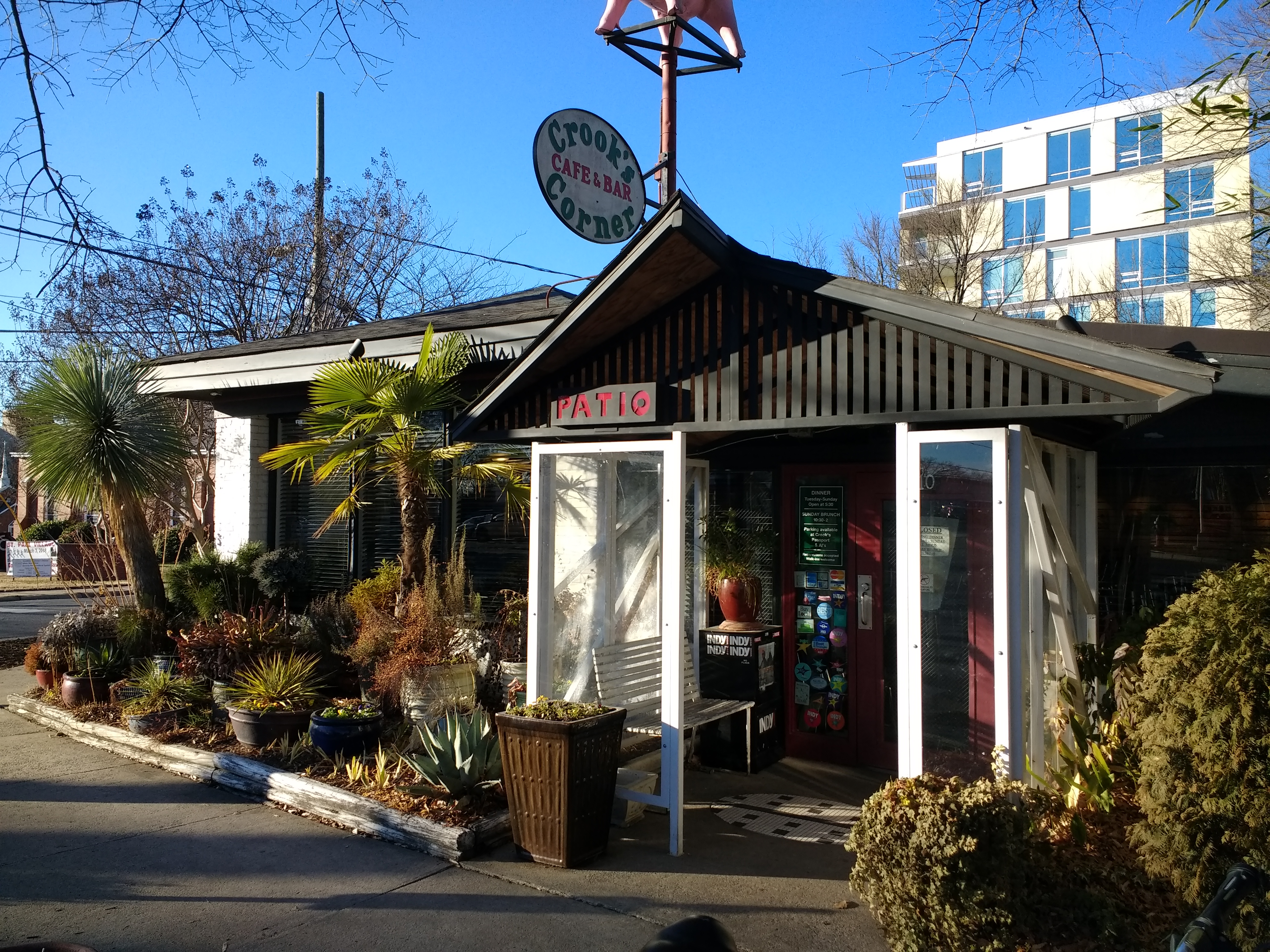
Crook's Corner in 2018

Neal opened a restaurant that year, Crook's Corner, with Gene Hamer, who he had worked with at La Résidence. It became known locally as Crook's, and Southern dishes such as Hoppin' John. In his cooking, Bill used cookbooks extensively as a reference, studying the origins of the dishes he cooked. The dishes he served were chosen for what Neal understood to be their historical significance in Southern cooking, such as the muddle, a fish soup that Neal stated "originated with the first settlers". The restaurant was part of a larger trend in 1980s American cuisine, where chefs highlighted regional cooking and the use of local ingredients.

He had high standards for the food he and his cooks prepared, and could at times be extremely angry and critical. Among the cooks Neal managed and mentored at Crook's were Robert Stehling, who later became known for his restaurant Hominy Grill, and John Currence, both recipients of James Beard Awards.

By 1985, Neal had a reputation as a talented young chef of Southern cuisine. That year, the influential restaurant critic Craig Claiborne visited Crook's Corner, and wrote his next two articles about Neal, establishing him as a major figure in southern cooking. At Crook's Corner, Neal put shrimp and grits on the menu, which were then little known in America: they were immediately popular, and through Crook's became widely known.

=== Writing and death ===
Neal was disinterested in a long-term career working at Crook's. He began writing in an effort to establish that as an alternative career, and wrote a number of cookbooks, including Bill Neal's Southern Cooking (1985) and Biscuits, Spoonbread, and Sweet Potato Pie. Southern Cooking, published through the University of North Carolina Press proved to be particularly influential, and it was reissued in 1989. His last book, Gardener's Latin, was unrelated to cooking but earned more money than any of his other writing. Bill was gay, and by around 1989 he knew he had contracted HIV. He died in 1991 at the age of 41.

== Legacy ==
In the years following his death, Neal's renown faded. Something of a reversal came in the early 2000s, when the University of North Carolina Press reissued Biscuits, Spoonbread, and Sweet Potato Pie, and in 2004, published Remembering Bill Neal: Favorite Recipes from a Life in Cooking, written by Moreton with a foreword by John T. Edge. Edge spoke highly of Neal's influence in retrospective discussions. Interviewed in a piece in The New York Times in 2003 covering a dinner of 100 admirers and colleagues held in Neal's honor, Edge credited Neal with building a sense of self-regard among Southern chefs, that their cooking was not something to be ashamed of.

At Crook's, Bill Smith took over the kitchen after Neal's death. He continued to cook at Crook's into the late 2010s when the business was sold. It closed in 2021 during the COVID-19 pandemic. An article in The New York Times reporting on the closure credited the restaurant with helping "spark a renaissance in Southern cuisine".

== See also ==
- List of cookbook writers

== Sources ==
- Medley, Kate; Paddock, Jesse (October 21, 2015). They Came For Shrimp & Grits: The Life & Work of Bill Neal (Video). Southern Foodways.
