= Bill Smith (chef) =

American chef and restaurateur

Bill Smith is an American chef.

== Biography ==
William Bryan Smith Jr. was born to a Pamlico County-based mailman, as the first of five children. He was raised in New Bern, North Carolina, and grew up around the women in his family—mother, aunts, grandmother—as they cooked a range of dishes. Oysters were particularly prominent when they were in season, given as gifts to his father on his mail route. In 1967 he enrolled in the University of North Carolina to study French, where he became involved in the student political movement and protested the Vietnam War. He found the experience enjoyable, viewing campus life as an outlet for creativity and self-expression that he had not had in his conservative hometown, but his involvement in student politics produced arguments with his father, a veteran of World War II, and they became estranged.

In 1968, Smith took on a job at Carolina Coffee Shop as a dishwasher. In the mid-1970s, he acted for seven months in an off-Broadway production of the musical Diamond Studs: The Life of Jesse James. He returned to Chapel Hill, North Carolina, and by 1978 had taken on a job at La Résidence, a French restaurant run by husband-and-wife Bill Neal and Moreton Neal. In the kitchen, Smith gained experience and increasing responsibility. In 1982, when the Neals divorced, Smith took on the role of chef, as Bill Neal left to start a new restaurant, Crook's Corner.

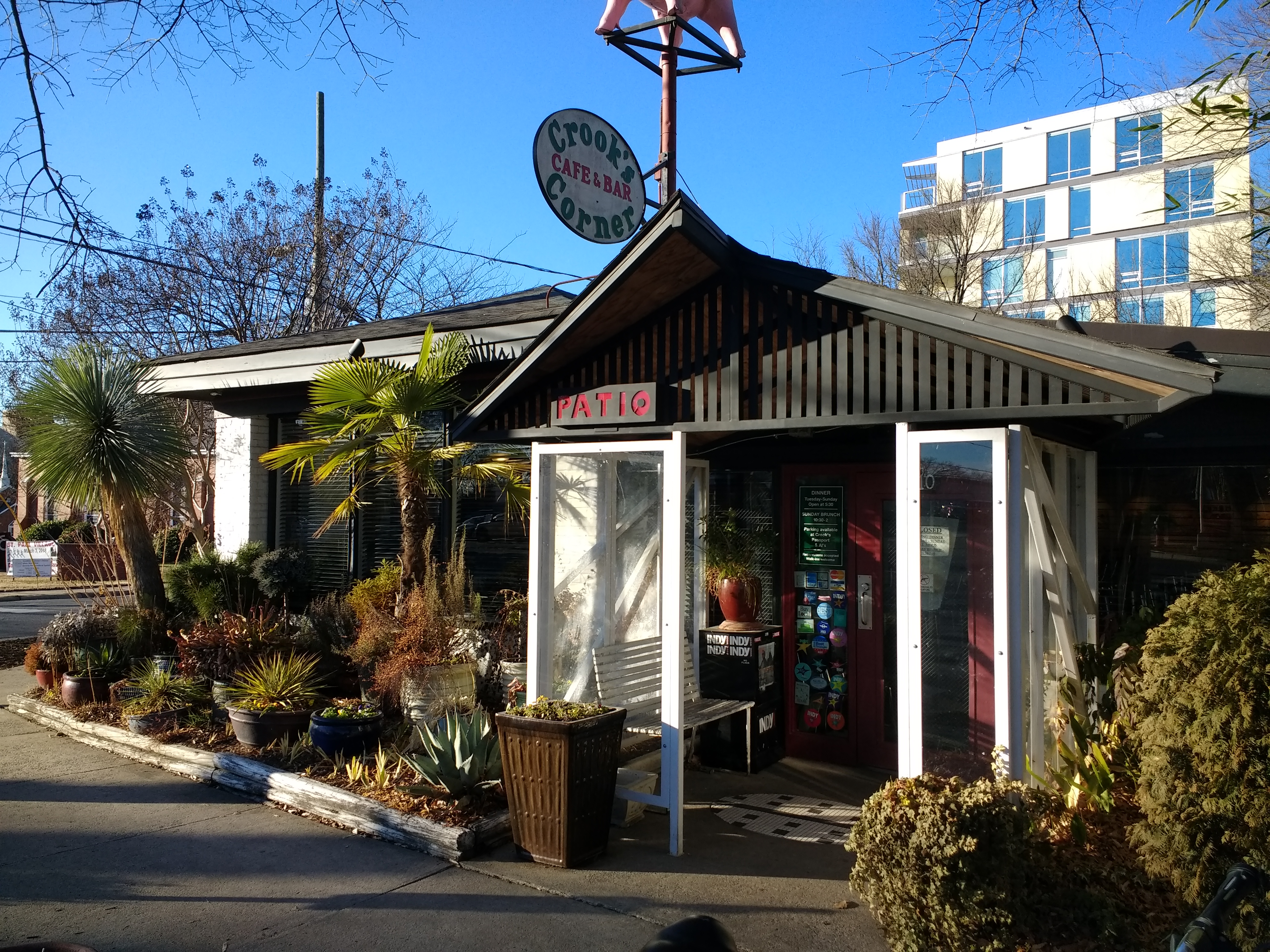
Crook's Corner in 2018

In 1984, Smith travelled to Nicaragua, where he studied Spanish at a language school run by the ruling Sandinista National Liberation Front, who aligned with his left-wing political views. Throughout the 1980s, Neal gained public standing as a chef through restaurant and cookbook reviews, raising his profile and that of Crook's Corner. In 1991, he died. A series of chefs followed in the Crook's Corner kitchen, until 1993, when Smith took on the job.

Under Smith's direction, Crook's Corner was awarded the title of America's Classics in 2011 by the James Beard Foundation. In the prior two years, Smith had been listed as a finalist for the Foundation's "Best Chef" award for the Southeastern United States. Many of the restaurant's staff were Mexican, a country Smith travelled to frequently. He remained in the role until his retirement in 2019.

== Writing ==
Smith has authored two books. His first, Seasoned in the South: Recipes From Crook’s Corner and From Home was published in 2005, and emphasizes history alongside the book's recipes. His second book, Crabs and Oysters: a Savor the South cookbook was published in 2015 by the University of North Carolina Press in their Savor the South series. More light in tone than his first, Crabs and Oysters includes autobiographical alongside the book's recipes.

== See also ==
- Atlantic Beach pie – created by Smith in 2011
