= Bill Robinson (fashion designer) =

American fashion designer (1948–1993)

Bill Robinson (1948 – 16 December 1993, New York City) was an American fashion designer. He was known for his "pioneering soft-shouldered jackets with slim waists, arresting combinations of just-off colors, and zippers going up the fronts of his vests."

== Early life and education ==
Robinson was born and raised in Philadelphia, Pennsylvania, and was a graduate of Parsons School of Design.

== Career ==
Before having his own label, Robinson worked for Anne Klein, Valentino, Stan Herman, Leo Narducci, Gloria Vanderbilt, Calvin Klein (chief menswear designer), and Yves St. Laurent.

== Personal life ==
Robinson's companion was Leo Chiu.
