= Lemon drop (cocktail) =

Cocktail

Lemon Drop
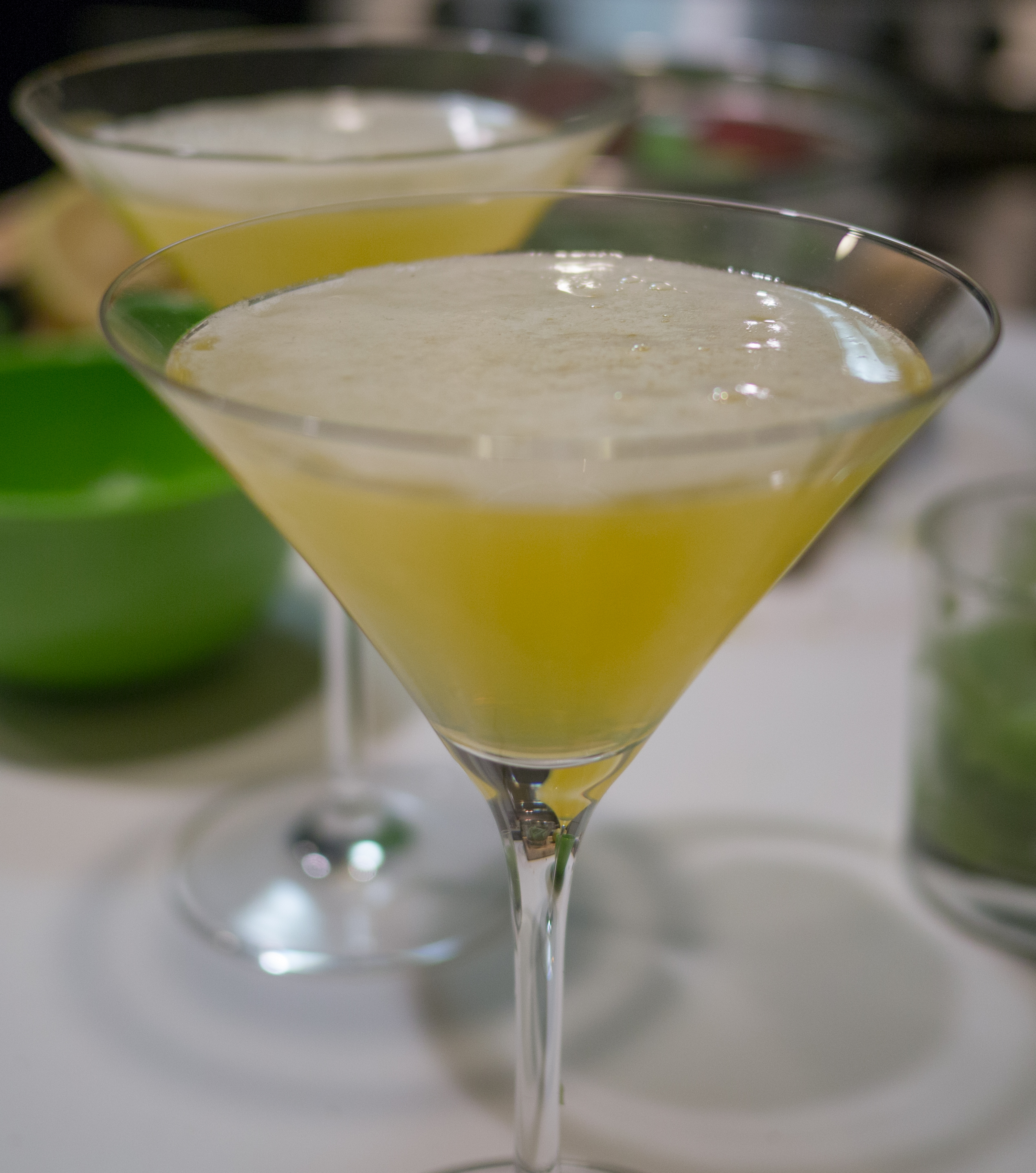
- Lemon drop
- Ingredients: 30 ml vodka citron; 20 ml triple sec; 15 ml fresh lemon juice
- Base spirit: Vodka
- Standard drinkware: Cocktail glass
- Standard garnish: sugar around rim
- Served: Straight up: chilled, without ice
- Preparation: Pour all ingredients into cocktail shaker, shake well with ice, strain into chilled cocktail glass. Garnish with sugar rim around the glass.

A lemon drop is a vodka-based cocktail that has a lemony, sweet and sour flavor, prepared using vodka, triple sec, and fresh lemon juice. It has been described as a variant of, or as "a take on", the vodka martini, but is in fact closer to a daisy or a white lady variant. It is typically prepared and served straight up – chilled with ice and strained.

The drink was invented sometime in the 1970s by Norman Jay Hobday, the founder and proprietor of Henry Africa's bar in San Francisco, California. Variations of the drink exist, such as blueberry and raspberry lemon drops, and some recipes call for simple syrup. It is served at some bars and restaurants in the United States, and in such establishments in other areas of the world.

== Overview ==
A lemon drop is a cocktail with a lemony, sweet and sour flavor, whereby the sweet and sour ingredients serve to contrast and balance one another. It is a vodka-based cocktail that is prepared with the addition of lemon juice and triple sec. Plain or citrus-flavored vodka may be used in its preparation, such as citron vodka. Lemon-flavored vodka is also sometimes used. Lemon juice that has been freshly squeezed may be used, which can produce a superior drink compared to using commercially prepared lemon juice. Some versions are prepared using the juice from Meyer lemons.

Cointreau-brand triple sec is used in some versions, and it may be prepared using a simple syrup that has been infused with lemon juice. Some versions are prepared using sour mix, a cocktail mixer. A garnish of a sliced lemon wheel, wedge, zest, rind or a lemon twist is sometimes used. Additional ingredients may also be used in the drink's preparation, such as ginger syrup and lavender extract.

A lemon drop is typically prepared straight up, meaning that it is shaken or stirred with ice, strained, and served in a stemmed glass, such as a martini glass. The glass may be prepared with a sugared rim, performed by dipping the rim of the glass in water or lemon juice and then dipping it into a rimmer (a shallow tray used in bartending), filled with sugar. Superfine sugar, also called bar sugar or caster sugar may be used.

== History ==
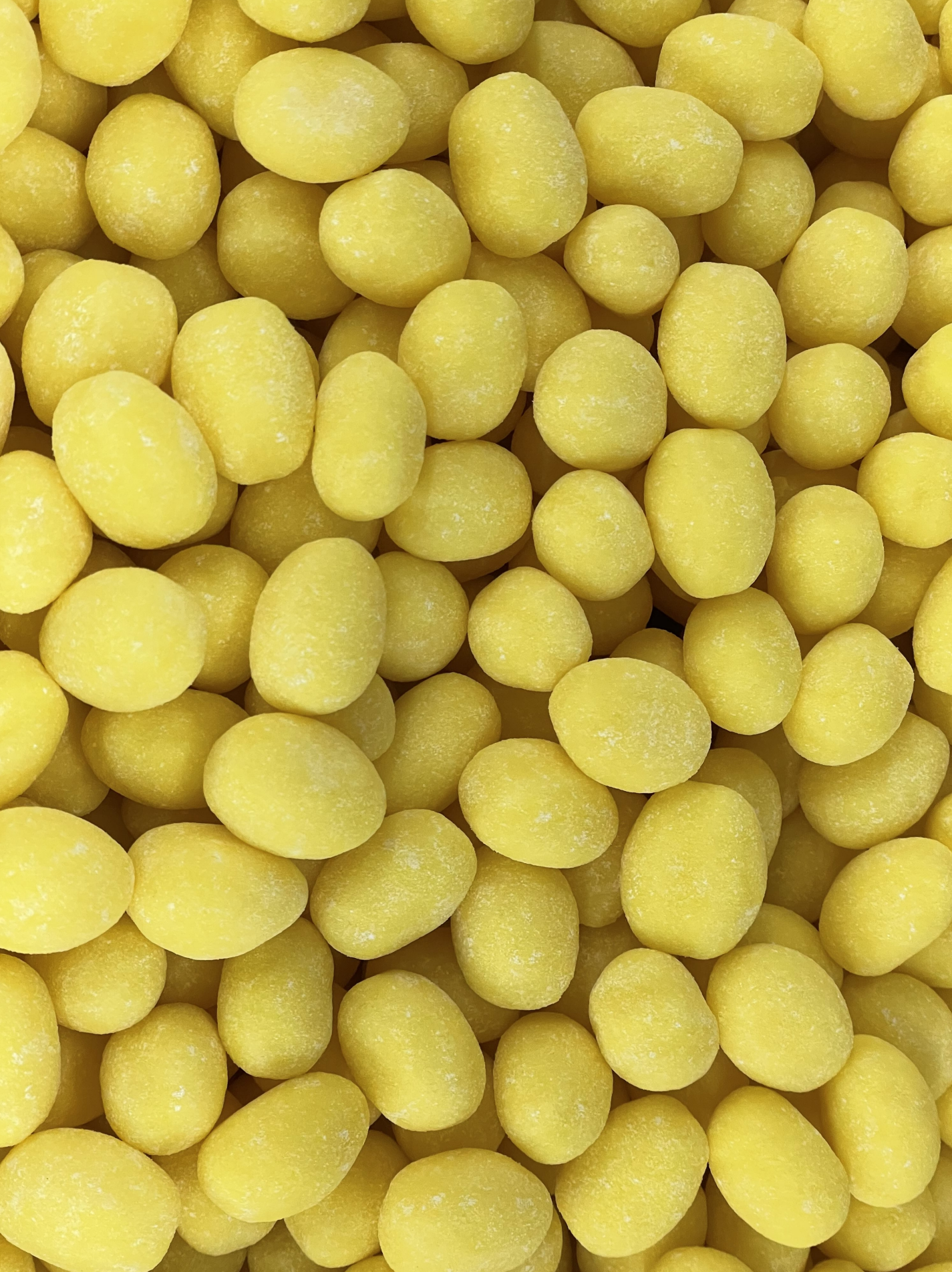
The inspiration

The lemon drop was invented sometime in the 1970s by Norman Jay Hobday, the founder and proprietor of Henry Africa's, a fern bar in the Russian Hill neighborhood of San Francisco, California that opened in 1969. It was originally served in a cocktail glass. The Lemon Drop was most likely named after lemon drop candy. After its invention, the drink swiftly spread to many San Francisco saloons. In the early 1990s, it was often prepared as a shooter or served in a shot glass. The shooter's recipe differed from the cocktail as it contained only one ingredient and a garnish.

== Variations ==
Variations of the drink include lemon drops prepared with blueberries and raspberries, which may use vodkas or other liquors flavored with these respective berries. These drinks may also be served or garnished with these berries, or with lemon. A blueberry lemon drop may be prepared with muddled blueberries, and a raspberry lemon drop may be prepared with puréed or crushed raspberries. Another popular variation uses limoncello as the base spirit.

The glass may have a sugared rim, and colored sugar may be used, prepared by adding food coloring to the sugar.

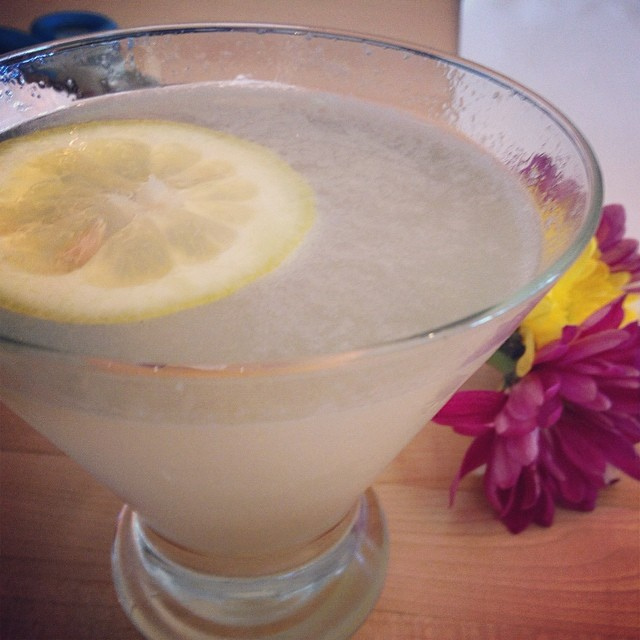
A lemon drop served with a lemon wheel

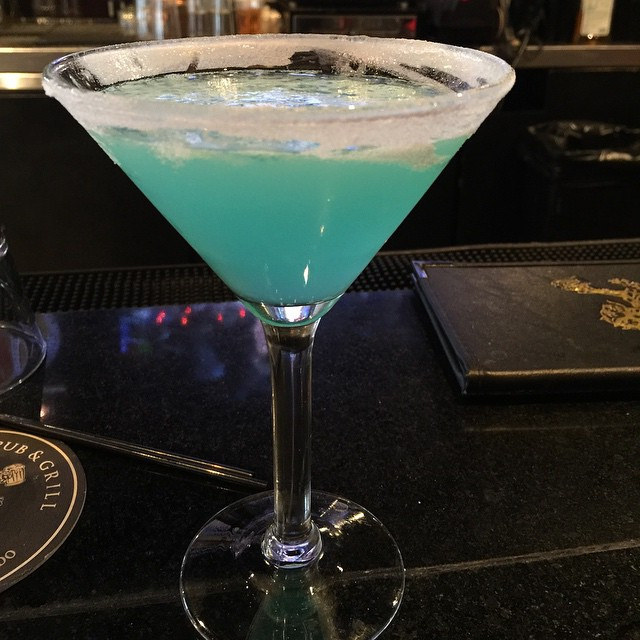
A blueberry lemon drop served with a sugared glass rim

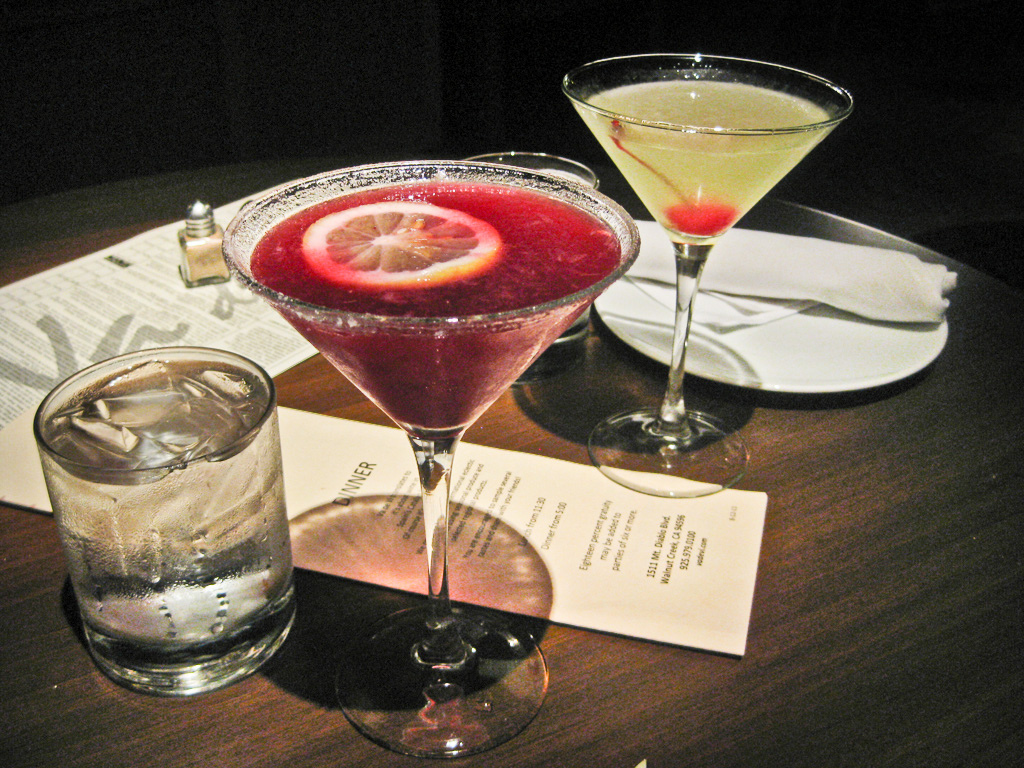
A blueberry lemon drop (at front) and an appletini

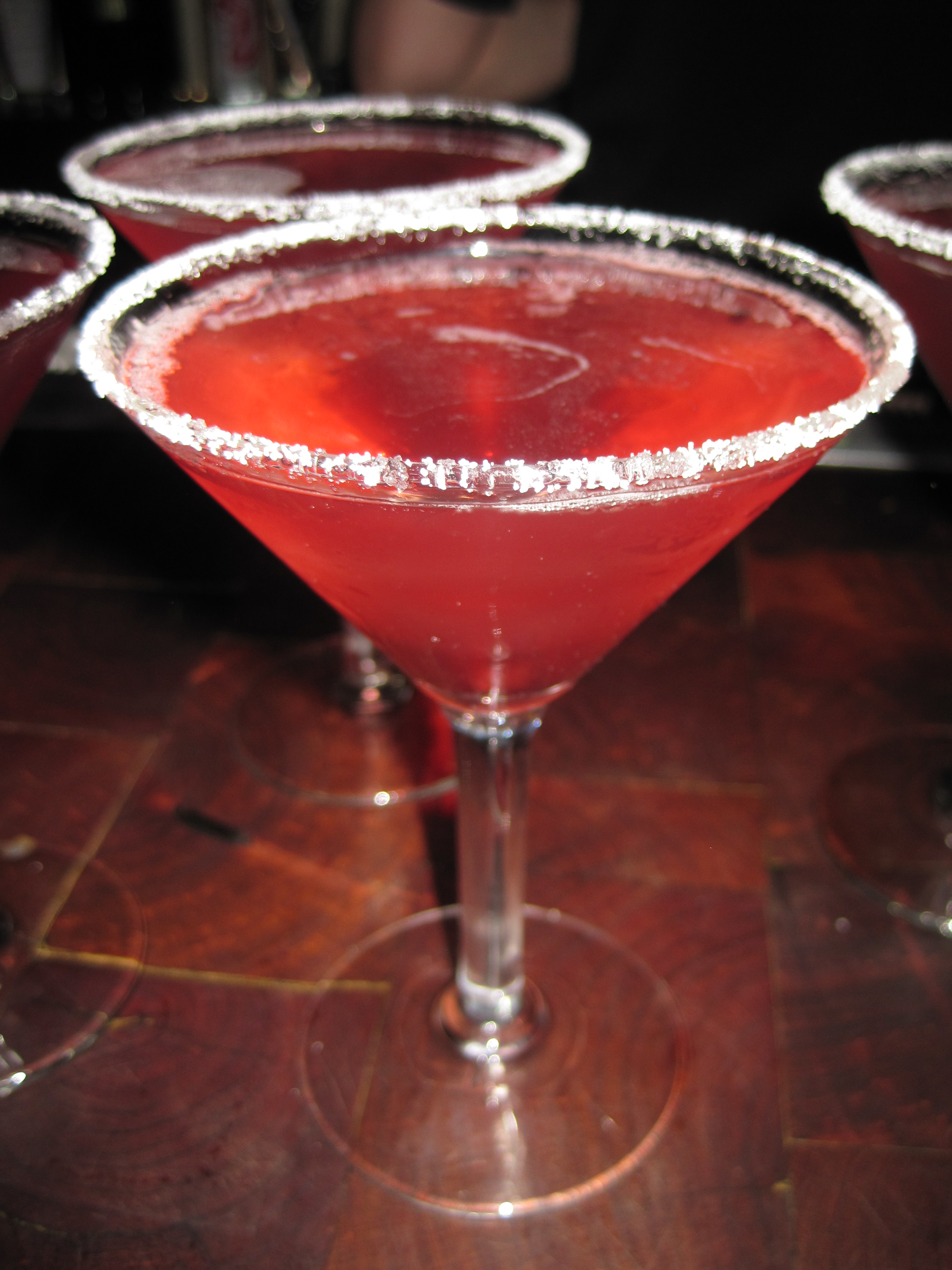
A lemon drop martini prepared with raspberry liquor

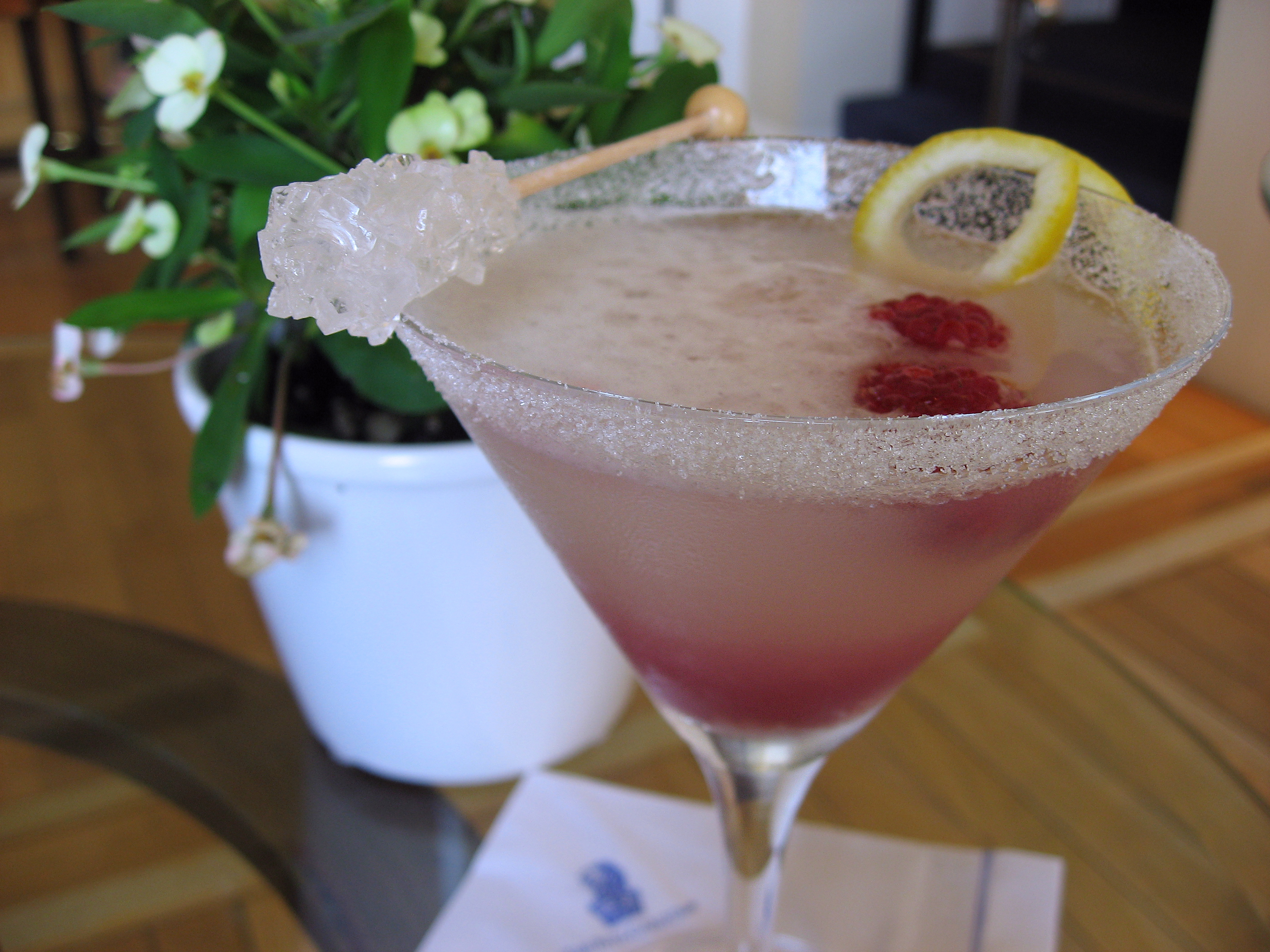
A raspberry lemon drop garnished with raspberry, lemon peel twist and rock candy

The "lemon drop shot" is a popular variant made with 2 parts vodka, 1 part lemon juice, 1/2 ounce of simple syrup, and served in a shot glass garnished with a sugar coated rim and lemon slice.

== In popular culture ==
In 2006, preparation of the lemon drop was presented on The Oprah Winfrey Show, prepared by Oprah Winfrey and Rachael Ray. The drink's popularity increased during this time.

Singer Madonna referenced sometimes drinking Lemon Drops in the 2019 song, "Back That Up to the Beat", released on her album, Madame X.

On September 18, 2024, in an interview with journalist Amol Rajan on BBC Two, former Prime Minister of the United Kingdom, Sir John Major, revealed that he was partial to the occasional Lemon Drop cocktail.

On June 13, 2025, K-Pop group Ateez released a song entitled "Lemon drop", inspired by the cocktail.

== See also ==
- Lemon liqueur
- List of cocktails
- List of lemon dishes and beverages
- Moon River – a similar cocktail prepared with gin
