= Licor de oro =

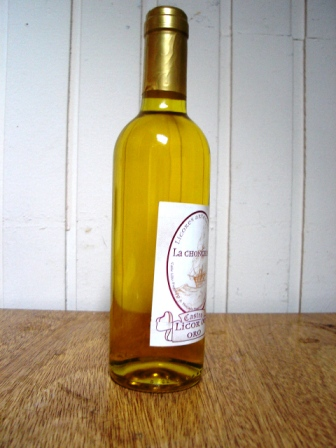
Bottle of Licor de oro

Licor de oro (English: Gold liqueur) is a typical Chilotan liqueur made of aguardiente and whey. The other ingredients are saffron and lemon peel, giving the liqueur a yellow color.

== See also ==
- Kitron
- Lemon liqueur
- List of lemon dishes and drinks
