= Grater =

Tool to grate something

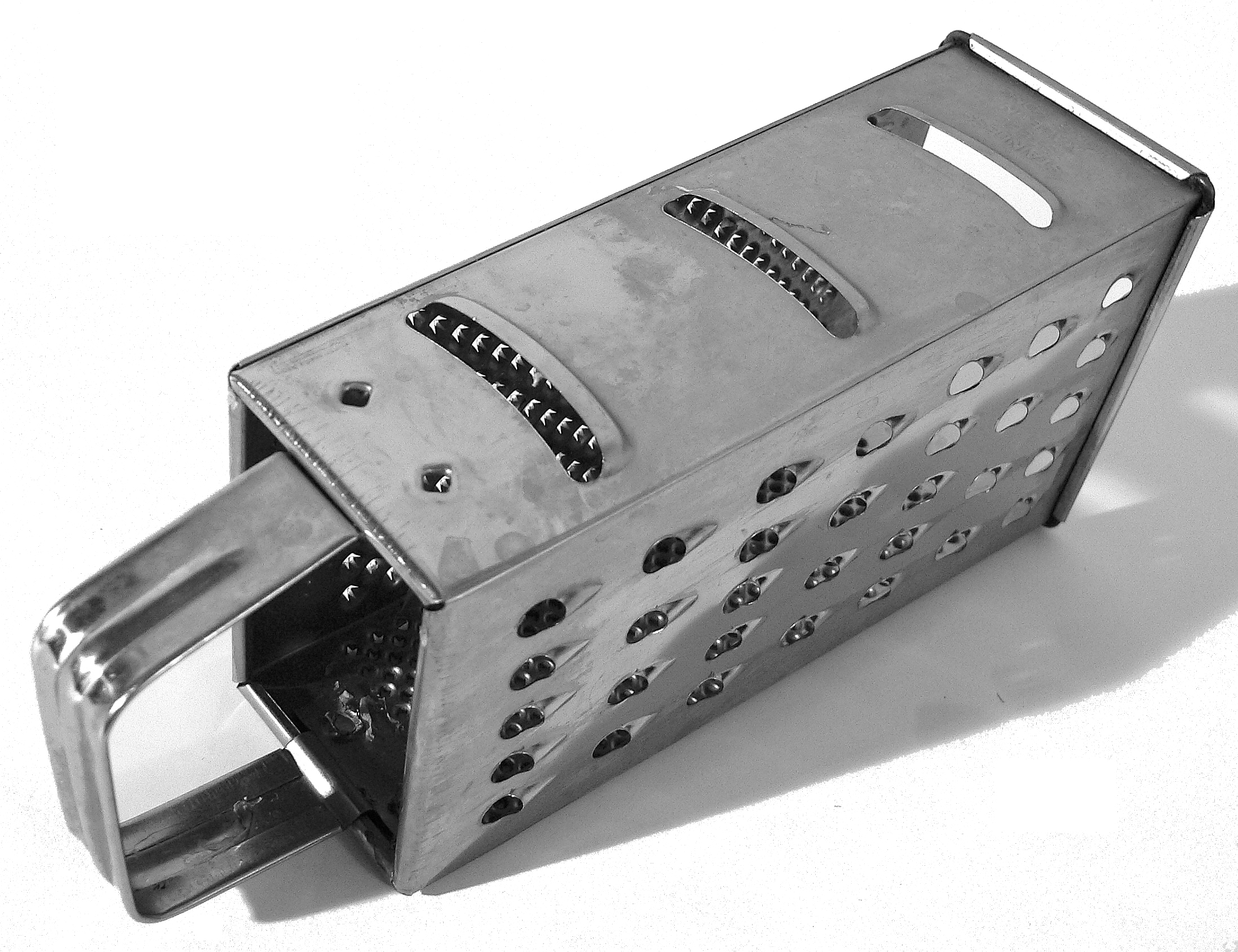
Box grater with a vegetable slicing surface (top) and grating surface (front) displayed

A grater, also referred to as a shredder, is a kitchen utensil used to grate or shred foods into fine pieces. They come in several shapes and sizes, with box graters being the most common. Other styles include paddles, microplane/rasp graters, and rotary drum graters.

== Uses ==
=== Food preparation ===
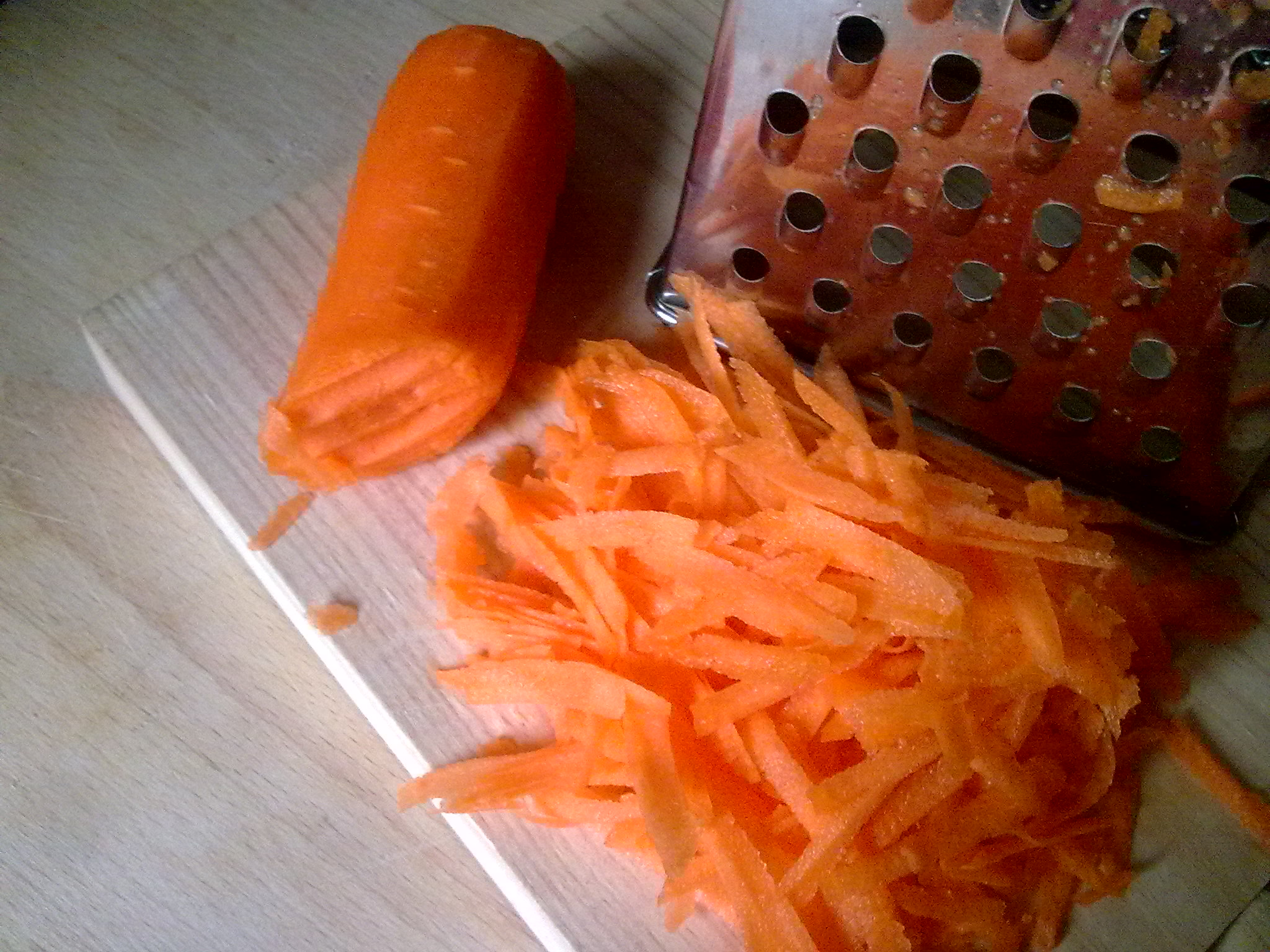
Grated carrot

Graters are commonly used to process vegetables, cheese, citrus peels (to create zest), and spices (such as ginger and nutmeg). They can also be used to grate other soft foods. Dishes whose preparation involves graters include toasted cheese, Welsh rarebit, egg salad, and foods containing cheese sauce such as macaroni and cheese and cauliflower cheese. Rotary graters are more efficient than other graters, due to their mechanical leverage, and are effective for processing harder foods like nuts.

Several types of graters feature different sizes of grating slots and can therefore aid in the preparation of a variety of foods.

In Slavic cuisine, graters are commonly used to grate potatoes for preparation of dishes, including draniki, bramborak or potato babka.

In tropical countries graters are also used to grate coconut meat. In the Indian subcontinent, the grater is used for preparation of a popular dessert, Gajar Ka Halwa.

Graters produce shreds that are thinner at the ends than the middle. This allows the grated material to melt or cook in a different manner than the shreds of mostly uniform thickness produced by the grating blade of a food processor. Hand-grated potatoes, for example, melt together more easily in a potato pancake than food-processed potato shreds.

=== In music ===
In Jamaica and Belize, coconut graters are used as a traditional musical instrument (along with drums, fife, and other instruments) in the performance of kumina, jonkanoo, brukdown, and sometimes mento.

== History ==
The first attested graters were made out of bronze, and also silver alloys, in the early first millennium BCE, examples of which were uncovered from burial sites in Greece and Etruscan Italy. In line with Homer's Iliad, these were sometimes used to grate goat's cheese in the making of a type of Kykeon, a fast-breaking drink.

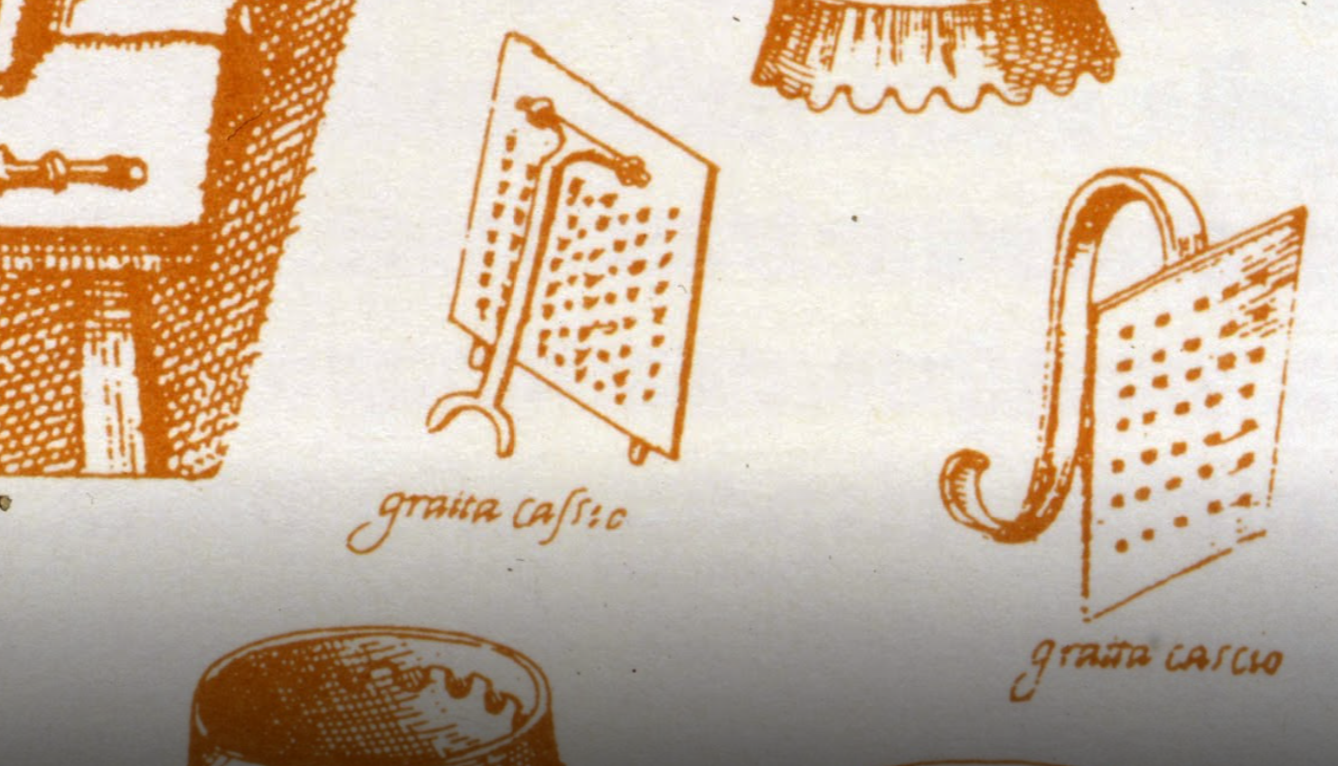
Early forms of a "modern" grater (by M. Agrappi and B. Scappi)

The origin of our modern graters is disputed. One of the earliest known depictions of a grater that resembles contemporary designs appeared in the Bartolomeo Scappi work, Opera dell'arte del cucinare, illustrated by Milano Agrappi, published in Venice in 1570. François Boullier invented a metal grater in 1540s France, designed during a European dairy surplus. His pewter design was intended to convert hard cheeses into something more edible.

== Images ==
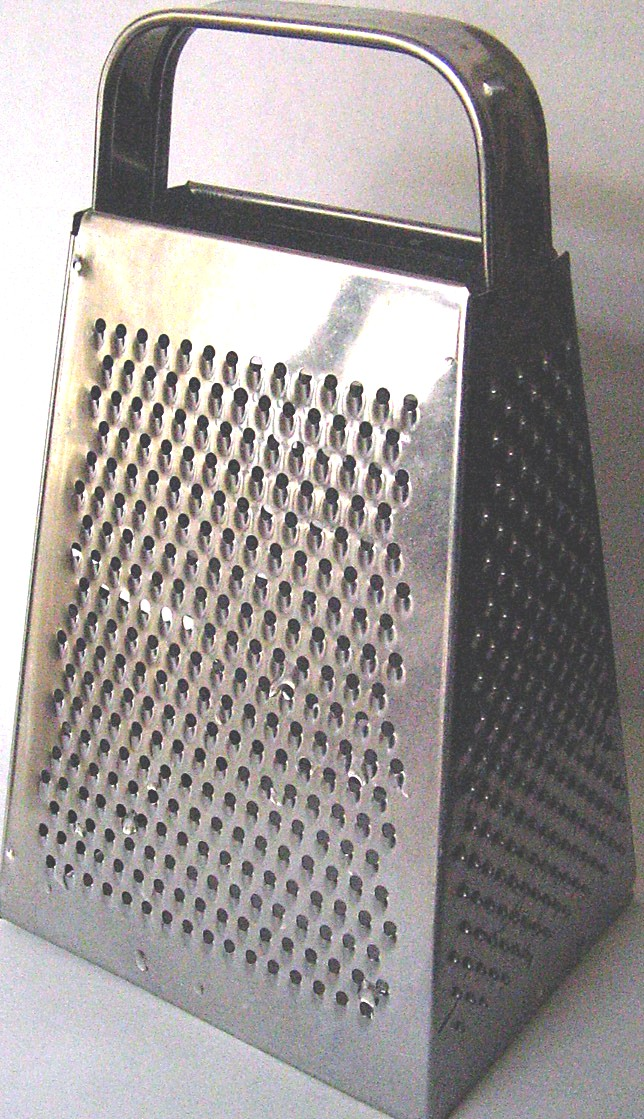
Cheese grater

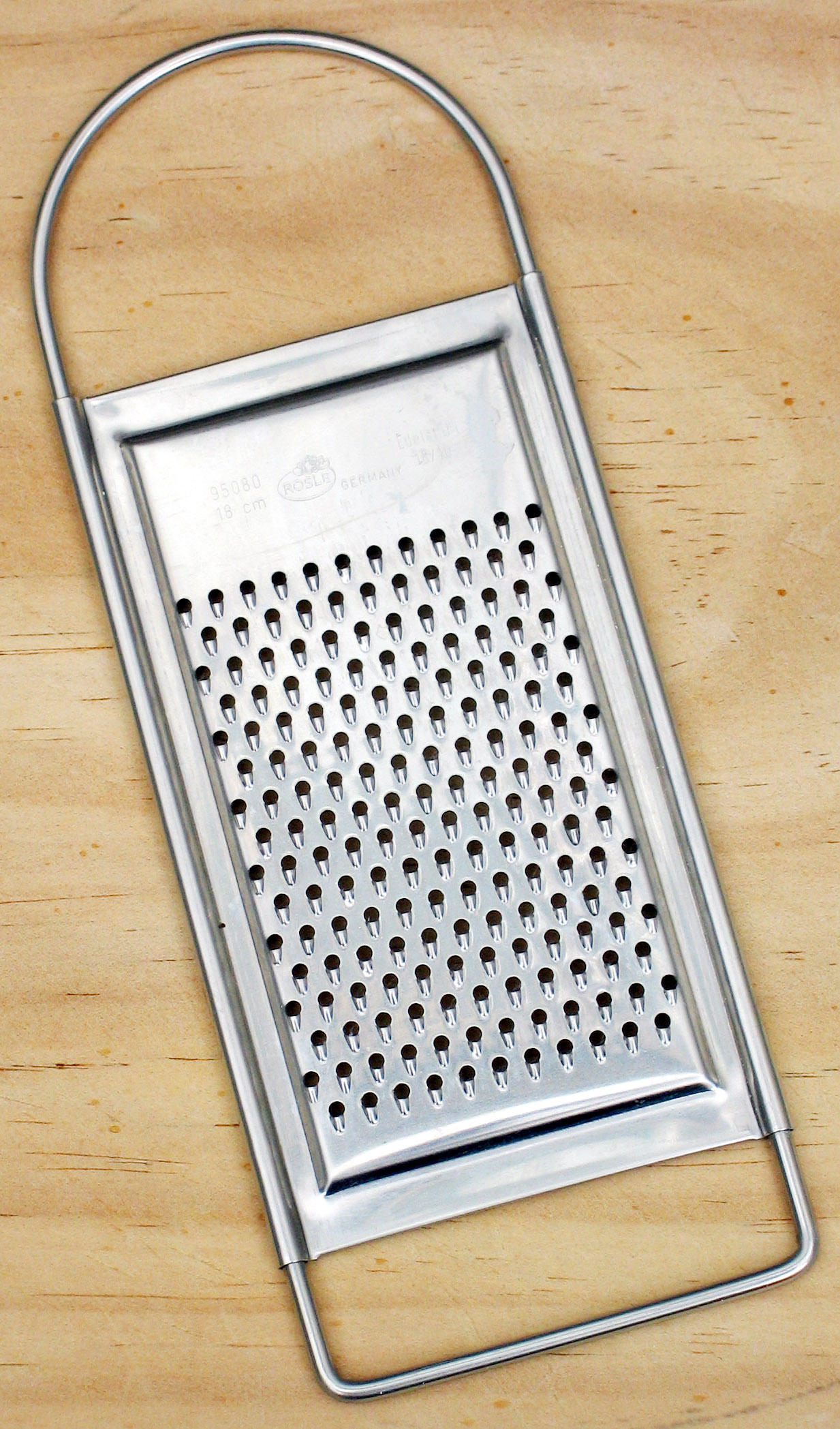
A zester

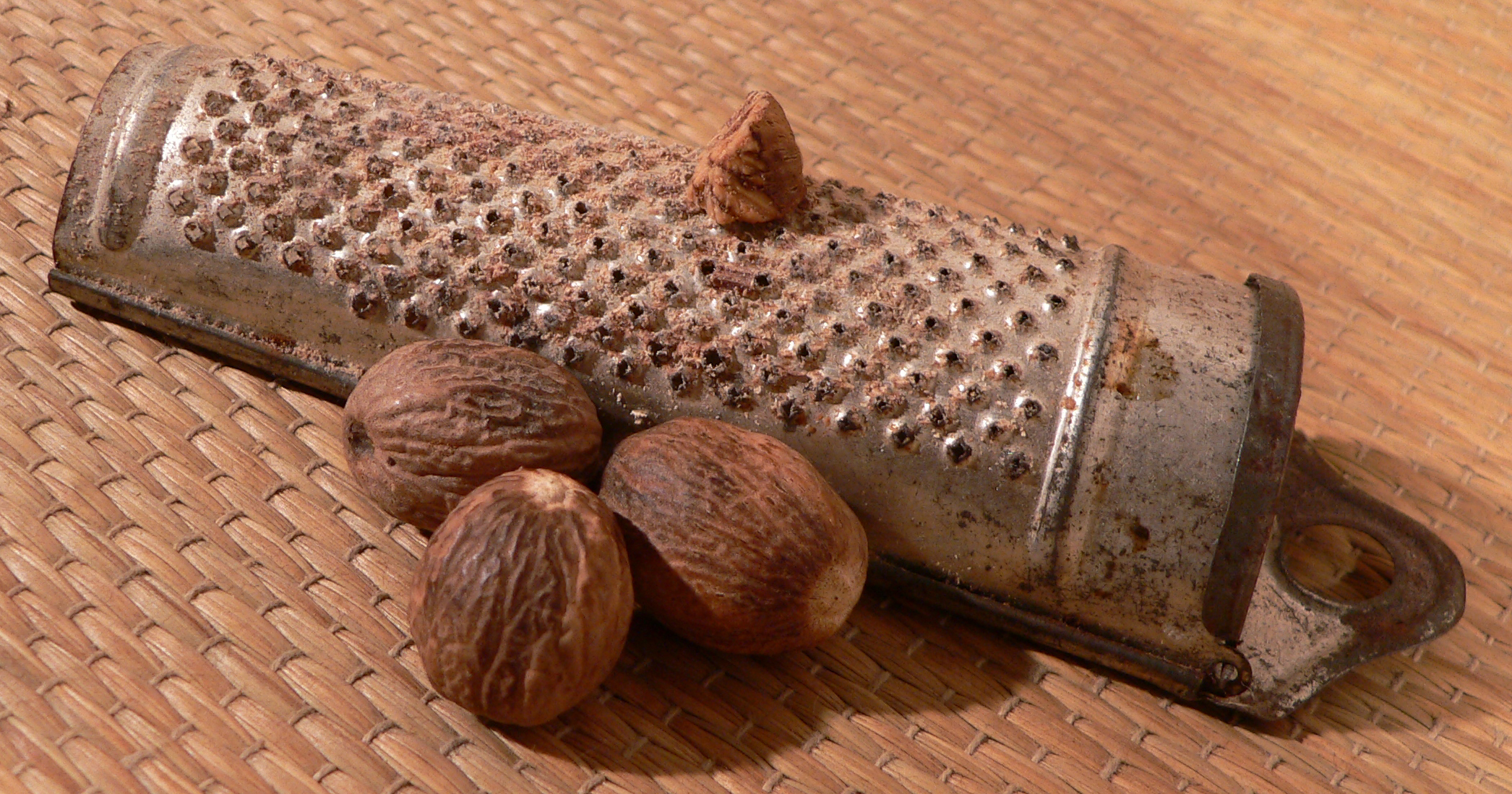
A nutmeg grater

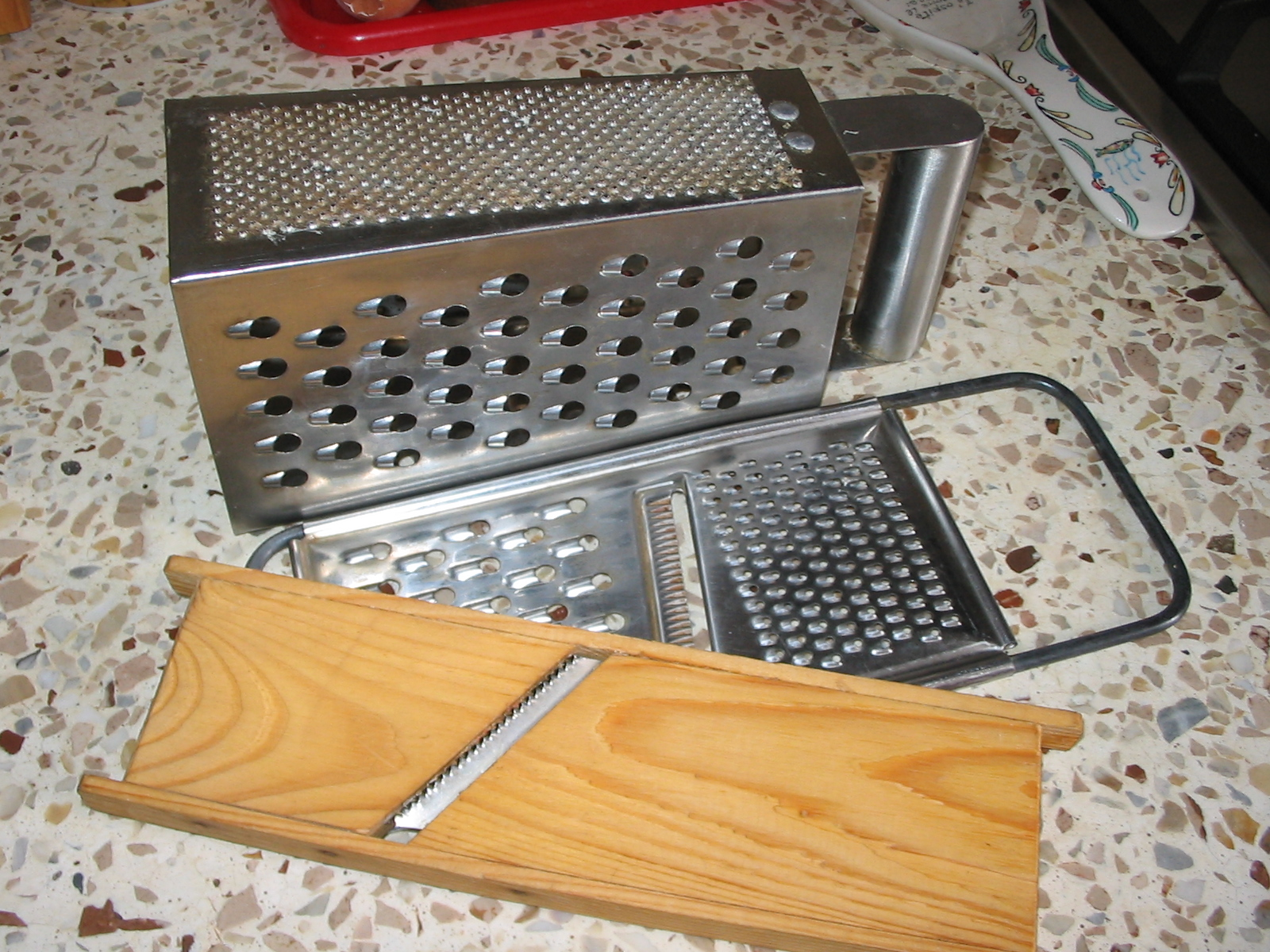
Multiple graters

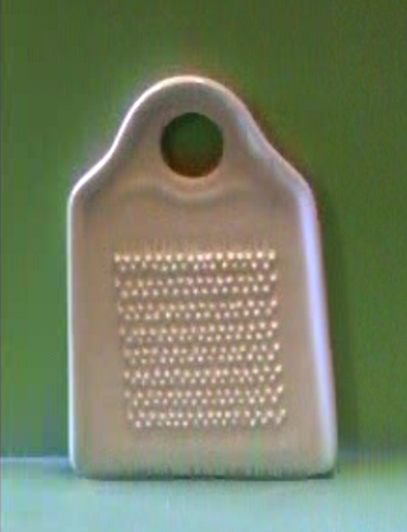
Porcelain ginger or garlic grater

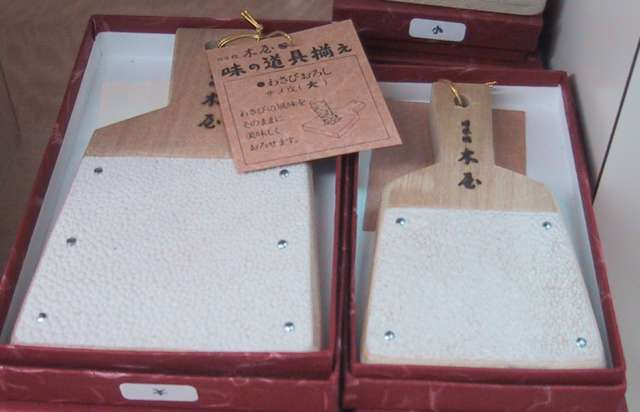
Sharkskin grater

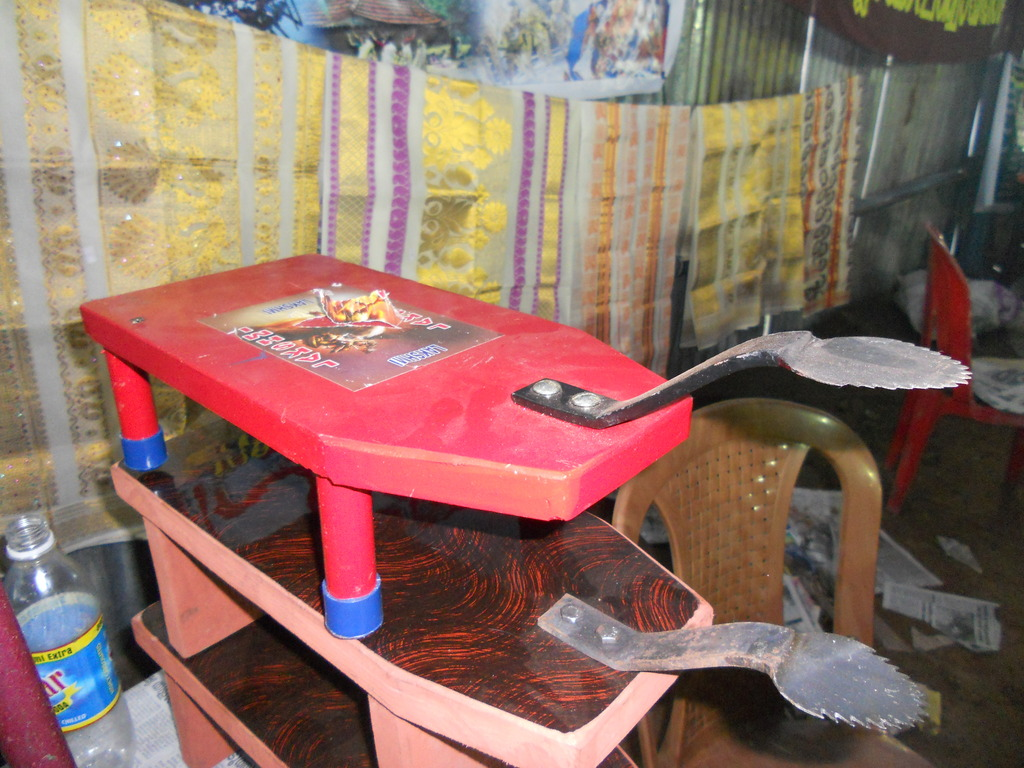
Traditional coconut grater design in the Indo-Pacific

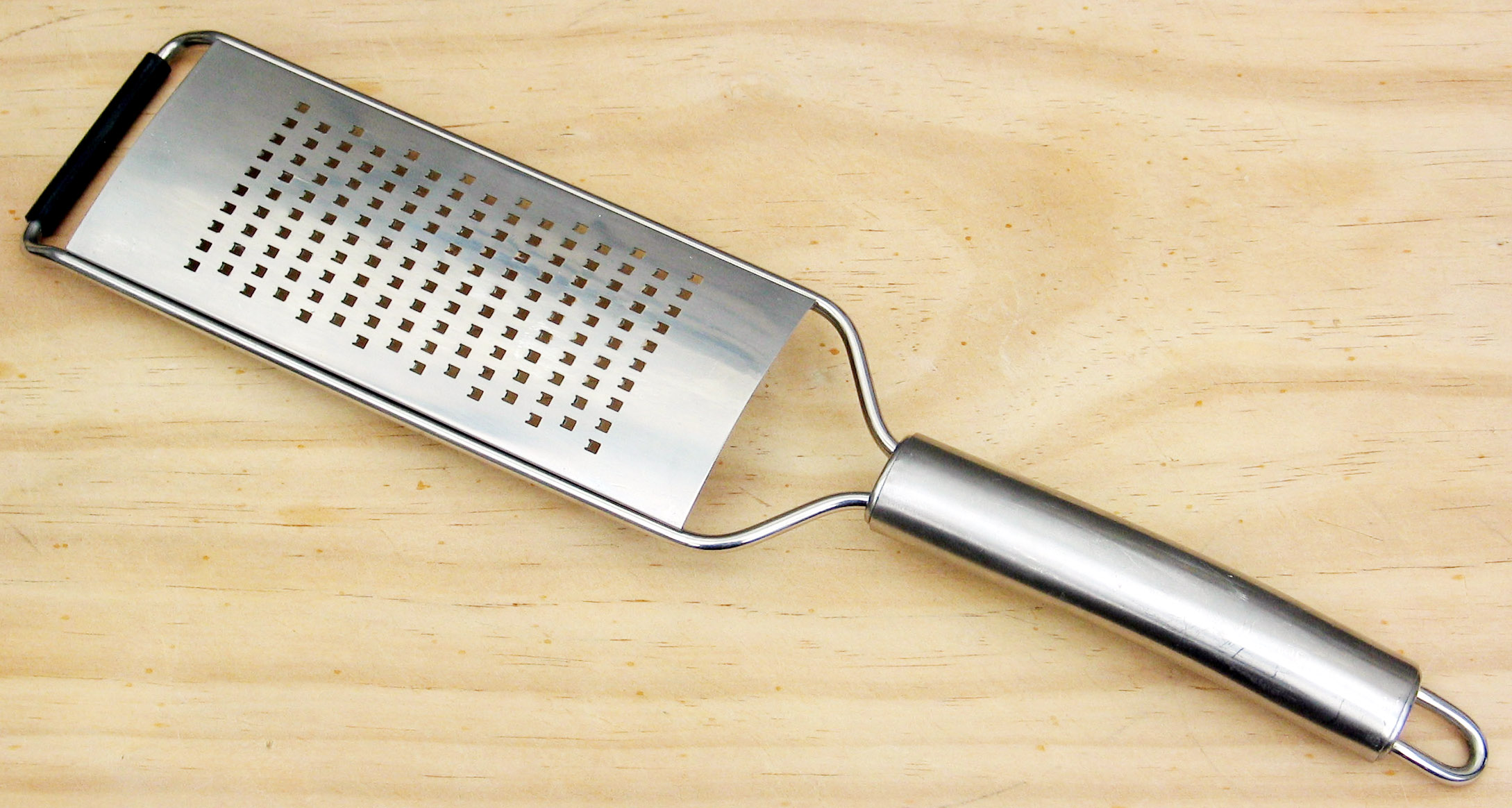
Microplane grater

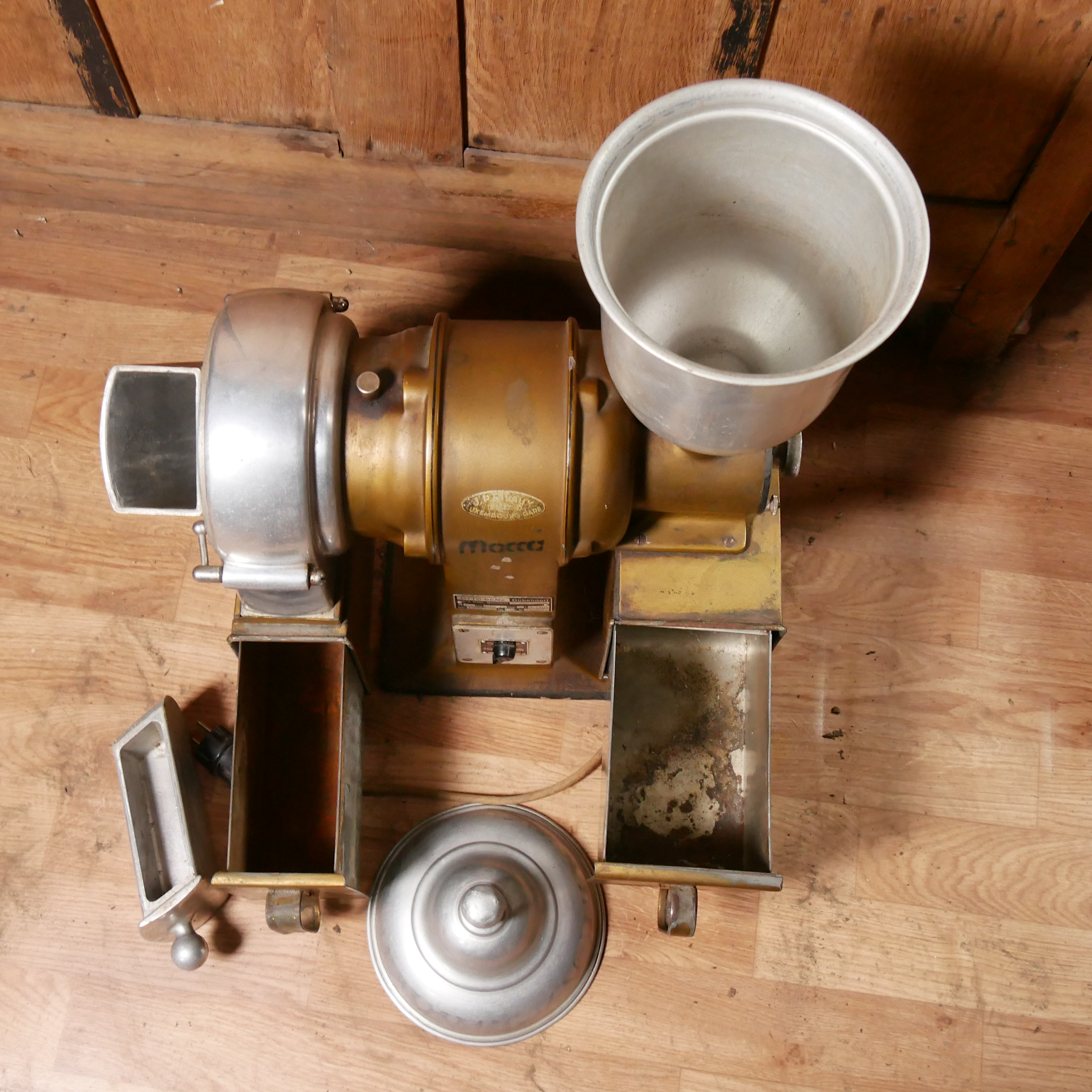
Combined electric coffee grinder and cheese grater Germany around 1930

== In popular culture ==
- Kevin Eastman, co-creator of the Teenage Mutant Ninja Turtles, got the idea for the Shredder's armor from large cheese graters which he envisioned on a villainous characters' arms to be used as weapons. Originally called "Grate Man", the Shredder is known as the primary antagonist in the TMNT franchise.
- Wisconsin sports fans are often called cheeseheads, and some wear cheese hats. In 2013, sports fans of Chicago and Minnesota replied to their rivals by wearing cheese graters.

== See also ==
- Food processor – an appliance that sometimes has a grating blade
- Spiral vegetable slicer – food-processing machine that rotates vegetables against a blade, producing ribbons or noodles
- Mandoline
- Oroshigane
- Surform
- Tamis
- Soap grater
