= Fern bar =

Type of upscale singles bar popular in the US in the 1970s and 1980s

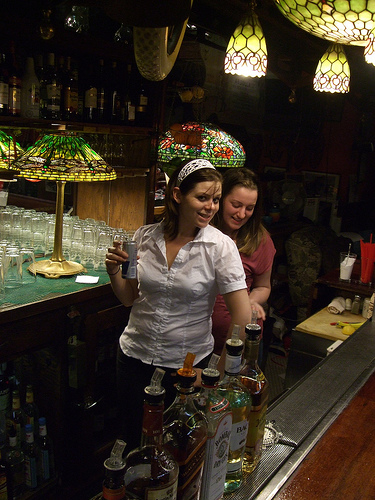
Bartenders at Eddie Rickenbackers fern bar in San Francisco with Tiffany lamps and motorcycle tire on ceiling (c. 2008)

Fern bar, in American slang, is an upscale or preppy (or yuppie) bar or tavern catering to singles, usually decorated with ferns or other greenery, as well as decor such as Tiffany-style lamps. They were gathering places for well-dressed "upscale" young men and women, initially during the sexual revolution of the 1970s—during which the phrase "fern bar" came into common regional usage—and later the yuppie era of the 1980s. Fern bars were frequently talked of disparagingly as singles bars where individuals would go to hit on men or women for sexual hookups. This image was common in the 1980s despite the fact that many people attended these bars for after-work occasions, parties or in groups.

Typical drinks served included wine spritzers, lemon drop martinis, frozen daiquirís, Harvey Wallbangers, and piña coladas. Franchises sometimes labeled "fern bars" include T.G.I. Friday's, Bennigan's, and Houlihan's.

== History ==
One of the first fern bars was the original T.G.I. Friday's on the corner of 63rd Street and First Avenue in a neighborhood on the Upper East Side of New York City, where many young single adults lived at the time. The founder, Alan Stillman, borrowed several thousand dollars from his mother, leased a saloon and remodeled it, converting the ambience to one that he thought might be attractive to young single women. The bar opened on March 15, 1965 and was soon copied by other restaurants in the neighborhood.

Another early fern bar, also thought to be the original birthplace of the Lemon Drop martini, was Henry Africa's in San Francisco, California. The bar opened in 1969 at Broadway and Polk Streets by out-of-work veteran Norman Hobday, who by his own account "took the opium-den atmosphere out of the saloons" in favor of "antique lamps and Grandma's living-room furniture". By some accounts Hobday copied the concept from another restaurant, Perry's, which opened several months earlier and was made famous as a singles "meet market" by Armistead Maupin's novel, Tales of the City (1978).

Hobday closed the establishment in 1986, and opened up Eddie Rickenbackers, another eclectic bar, the next year.

== See also ==
- Types of drinking establishments
- Cocktail (1988 film)
