= Limoncello =

Italian lemon liqueur

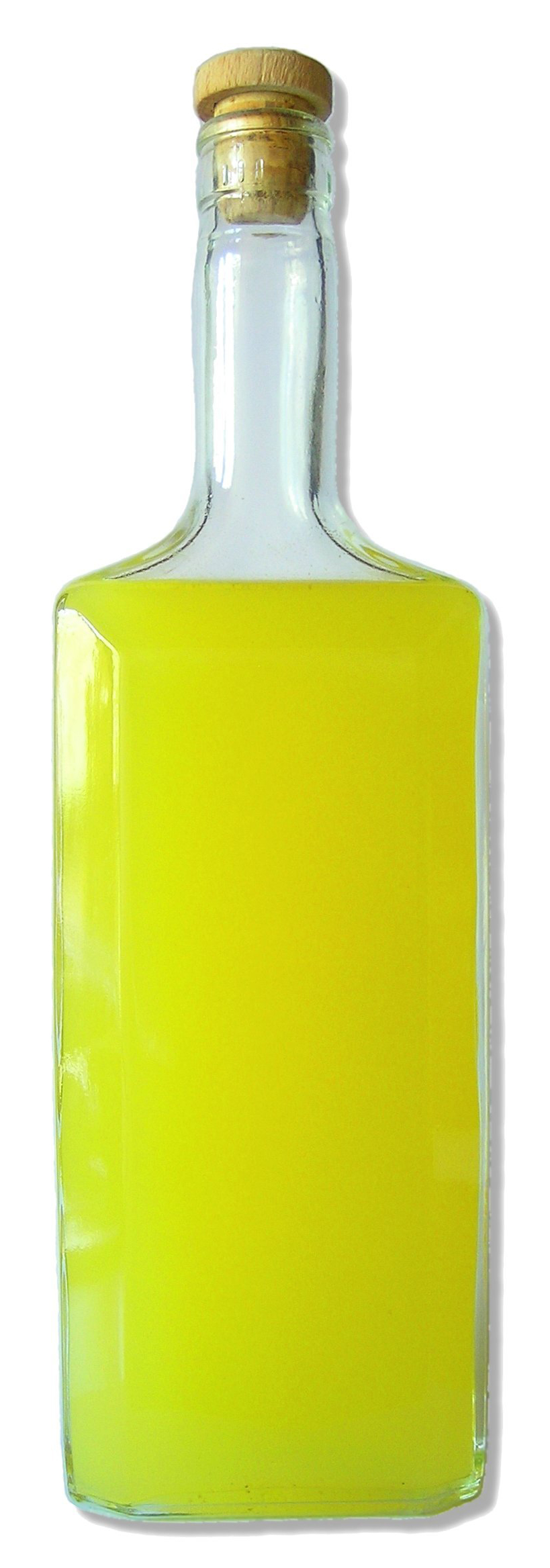
- Homemade limoncello
- Type: Alcoholic beverage
- Place of origin: Italy
- Main ingredients: Water, lemon zest, rectified spirit, sugar

Limoncello (Italian: [limonˈtʃɛlːo]) is a traditional lemon liqueur produced mainly in Southern Italy, especially around the Gulf of Naples, the Gulf of Salerno, as well as in Sicily and in Gargano. It is the second-most popular liqueur in Italy and is traditionally served chilled as an after-dinner digestif. It is also a popular homemade liqueur, with various recipes available online and in print.

Limoncello is made from the zest of lemons and usually has a slightly turbid appearance, caused by suspended small essential oil droplets.

== History ==
The exact origin of limoncello is disputed. The industry trade group Federazione Italiana Industriali Produttori Esportatori ed Importatori di Vini, Acquaviti, Liquori, Sciroppi, Aceti ed affini says that limoncello was created at the beginning of the 1900s by the grandmother of Maria Antonia Farace, who lived in a small guesthouse in Isola Azzurra. According to Charles Perry of the Los Angeles Times in 2004, limoncello was invented in Sicily about 100 years earlier. Journalist Kristen Tillotson of the Minneapolis Star Tribune says that it was first made on the Amalfi coast, where several villages and islands claim to be its place of origin. It may have been invented by a citrus-grove tender from Azzurra around 1900, or by monks or fishermen much earlier.

== Production ==
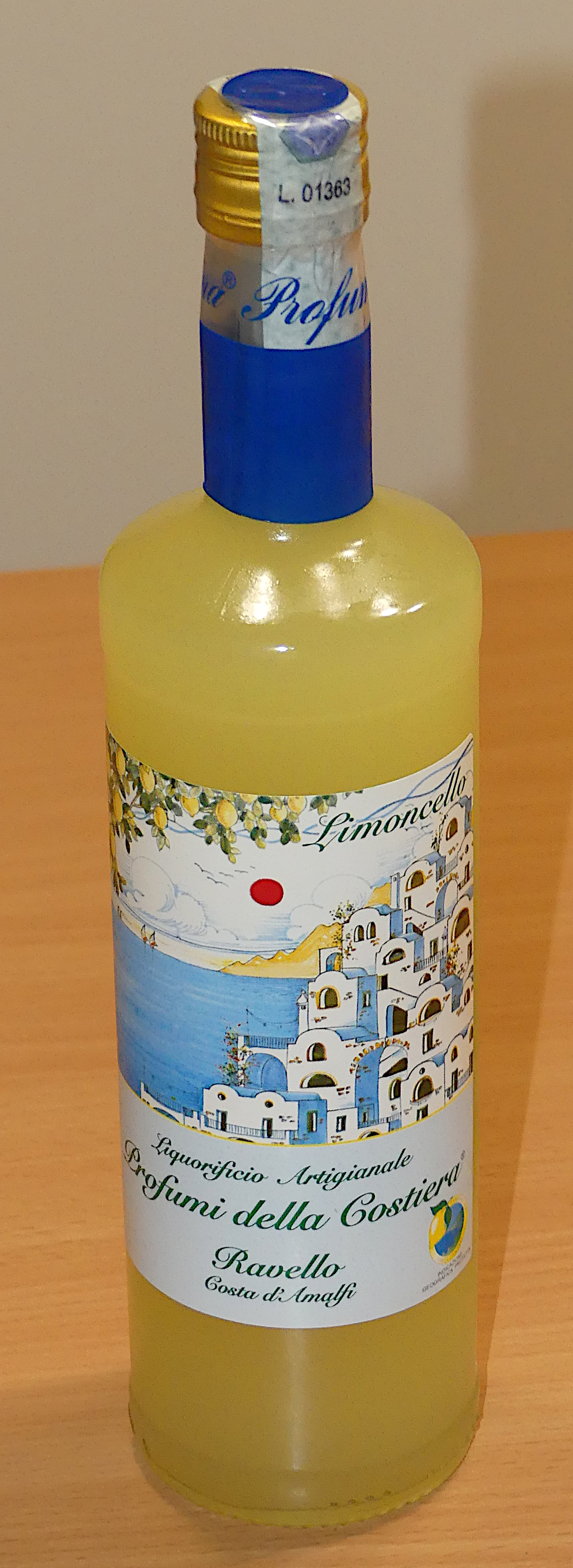
Limoncello

Limoncello is mainly produced in southern Italy, especially in the region around the Gulf of Naples, the Amalfi Coast, Sicily and Gargano.

Traditionally, limoncello is made from the zest of Femminello St. Teresa lemons, also known as Sorrento or Sfusato lemons. Lemon zest, or peel without the pith, is steeped in rectified spirit until the oil is released. The resulting yellow liquid is then mixed with simple syrup. Varying the sugar-to-water ratio and the temperature affects the clarity, viscosity, and flavor. It has a slightly turbid appearance, caused by small (approximately 100 nanometers) essential oil droplets suspended in the drink. Opaque limoncello results from spontaneous emulsification (also known as the ouzo effect) of the sugar syrup and extracted lemon oils.

Commercial production was about 15 million liters in 2003.

== Popularity ==
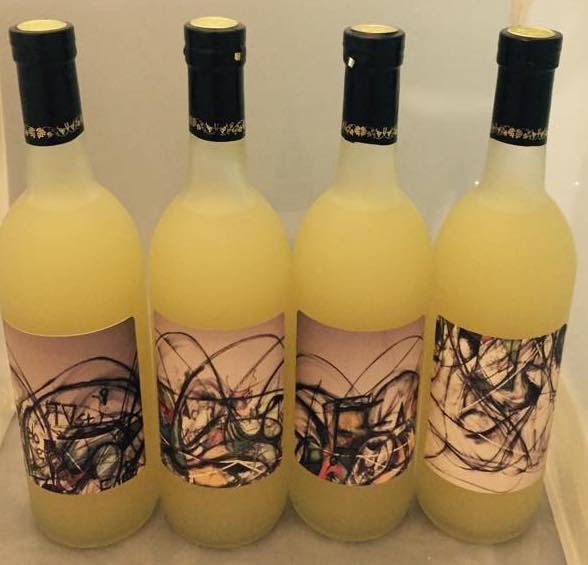
Bottles of limoncello

Limoncello is the second-most popular liqueur in Italy after Campari.

== Serving ==
Limoncello is traditionally served chilled as an after-dinner digestif.

A Ligurian Riviera spritz is limoncello mixed with prosecco or diet tonic water. An Amalfi spritz, so named because limoncello originates from the Amalfi Coast, is made by mixing fizzy lemonade or soda water with limoncello.

== Alcohol content ==
Alcohol content can vary widely, especially among homemade variants, but the typical alcohol content is about 30% (+/−3%) by volume.

== Variants ==
Many variations of limoncello are also available. These include arancello (flavored with oranges), agrumello (flavored with mixed citrus), pistachiocello (flavored with pistachio nuts), meloncello (flavored with cantaloupe), and fragoncello (flavored with strawberry). A version made with milk instead of simple syrup also exists, known as crema di limoncello, and is often less alcoholic, at around 17% alcohol content by volume.

Variant	Ingredient	Description
Arancello	Orange	Has a sweeter, softer taste; sometimes called orangecello
Limecello	Lime zest	Sharper, slightly more bitter twist
Mandarincello	Mandarins or tangerines	Milder, more delicate liqueur
Pompelmocello/pomecello	Grapefruit zest	Adds bitterness and complexity
Raspicello	Raspberries	Vibrant color and fragrant, fruity taste
Kiwicello/mangocello/peachcello	Kiwi, mango, peach	Infuses sweetness and distinctive fruitiness. Kiwicello is sometimes sweetened with honey.
Orange cinnamon	Orange zest and cinnamon sticks	Spiced, wintery profile
Zenzerino	Ginger	Spicy, warming liqueur

== See also ==
- List of lemon dishes and drinks
