= Lemon drop (candy) =

Sugar coated, lemon-flavored candy

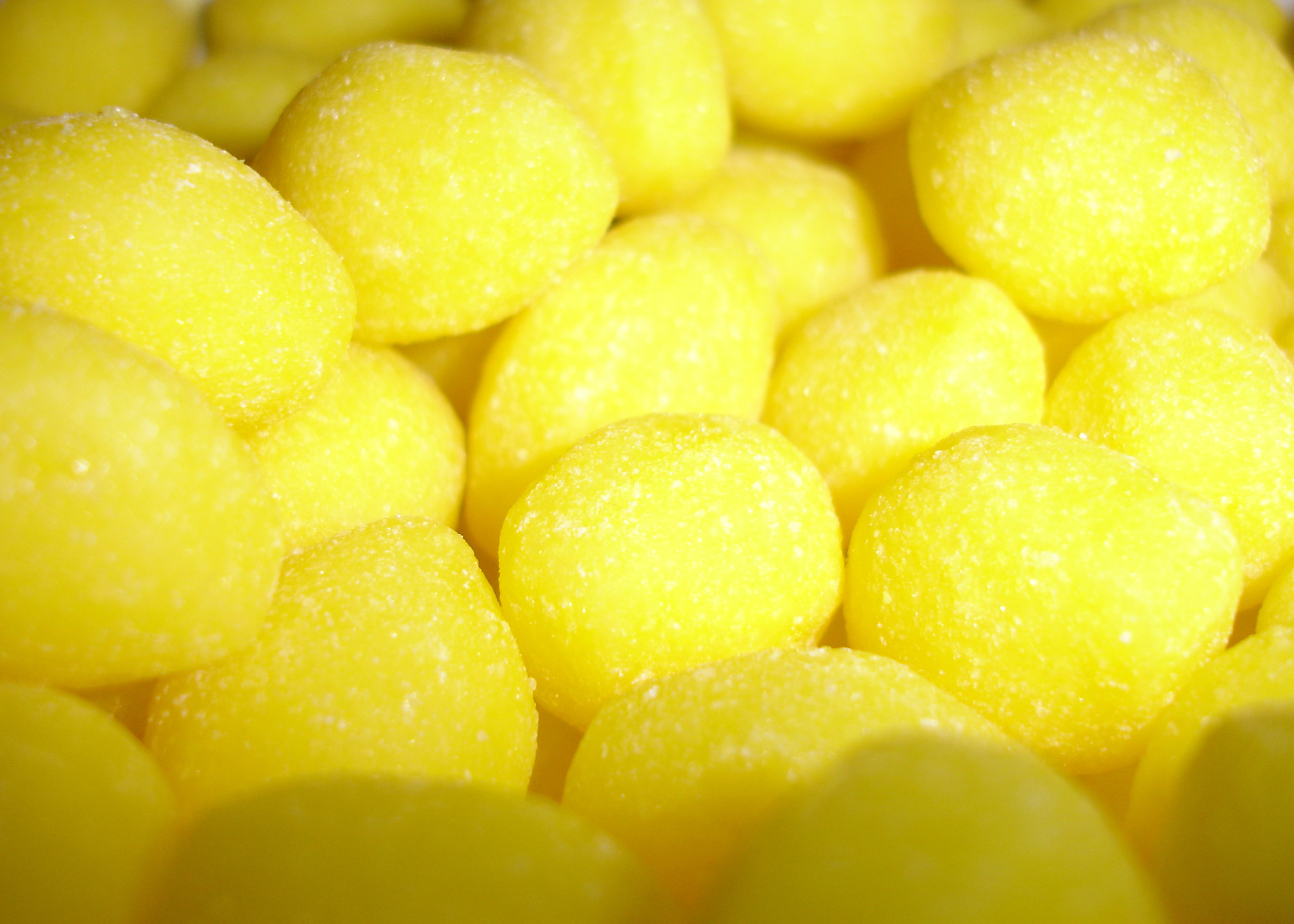
- Alternative names: LemonHeads
- Type: Confectionery
- Place of origin: England
- Main ingredients: Sugar, flavoring (lemon), food coloring

A lemon drop is a sugar coated, lemon-flavored candy that is typically colored yellow and often shaped like a lemon. They can be sweet or have a more sour flavor. Lemon drops are made by boiling sugar, water and cream of tartar until it reaches the hard crack stage. As the mixture cools, lemon flavor is added. The candy is then rolled into long ropes, cut into small pieces and rolled in sugar. Lemon drops originated in England, where confectioners learned that adding acid such as lemon juice to the boiled sugar mixture prevented sugar from crystallizing.

The term "lemon drop" is also occasionally applied to lemon-flavored throat lozenges, and is the namesake of a cocktail consisting of lemon juice, vodka and sugar.

== See also ==
- Lemon drop – a vodka-based cocktail
- Sherbet lemon
- Lemonhead (candy)
