= Zester =

Kitchen utensil for obtaining zest

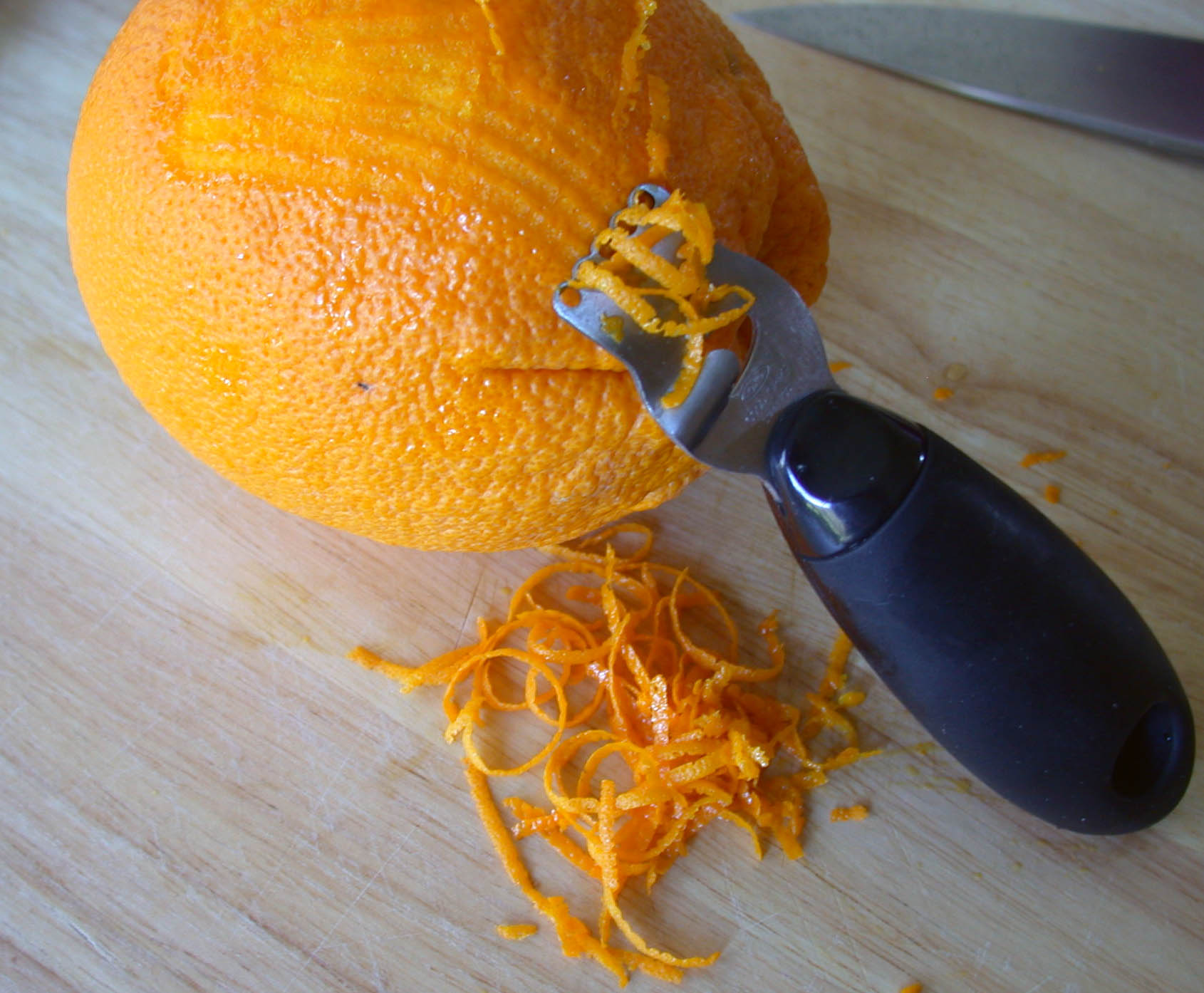
A zester zests an orange.

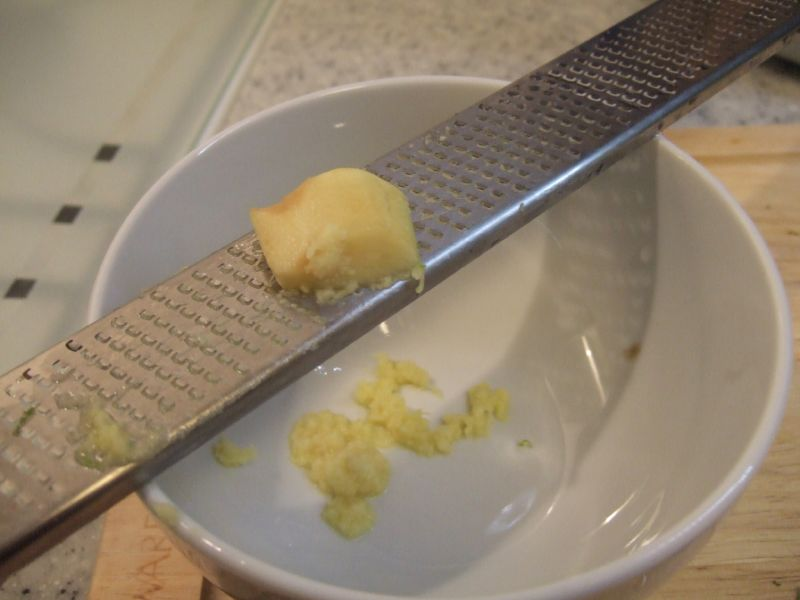
A Microplane grater / zester in use

A zester (also citrus zester or lemon zester) is a kitchen utensil for obtaining zest from lemons and other citrus fruit. A kitchen zester is approximately four inches (100 mm) long, with a handle and a curved metal end, the top of which is perforated with a row of round holes with sharpened rims. To operate, the zester is pressed with moderate force against the fruit and drawn across its peel. The rims cut the zest from the pith underneath. The zest is cut into ribbons, one drawn through each hole.

Other tools are also sometimes called zesters because they too are able to separate the zest from a citrus fruit. For example, when Microplane discovered that its surform type wood rasps had become popular as food graters and zesters, it adapted the woodworking tools and marketed them as "zester / graters".

== See also ==
- Grater
- Oroshigane
- Surform
