= Moon River (gin cocktail) =

Gin cocktail

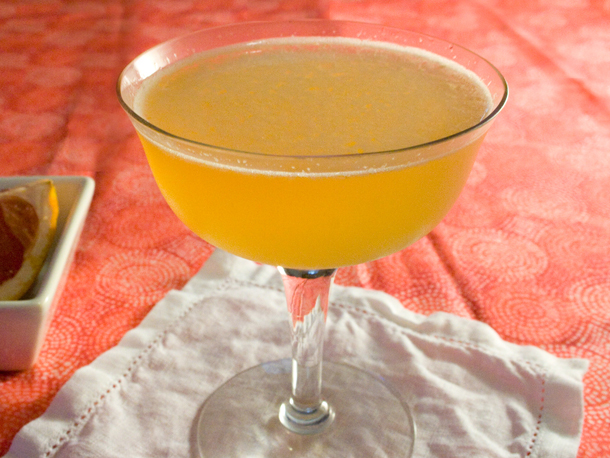
- The Moon River cocktail (gin version)
- Type: Cocktail
- Base spirit: Gin
- Standard drinkware: Cocktail glass
- Standard garnish: cocktail cherry
- Served: in chilled cocktail glass

The Moon River is a gin-based cocktail.

== Characteristics ==
Ingredients and measures: 4-5 ice cubes; 1/2 measure dry gin; 1/2 measures apricot brandy; 1/2 measure Cointreau; 1/4 measure Galliano; 1/4 measure fresh lemon juice; cocktail cherry for decoration.

== Preparation ==
Put some ice cubes into a mixing glass. Pour the gin, apricot brandy, Cointreau, Galliano, and lemon juice over the ice, stir, then strain into a large, chilled cocktail glass. Decorate with a cocktail cherry.

== See also ==
- Bronx (cocktail)
- Lemon Drop – a similar cocktail prepared with vodka
- List of cocktails
- Gibson (cocktail)
- Vesper (cocktail)
