= Lemon liqueur =

Liqueur made from lemons, liquor, and sugar

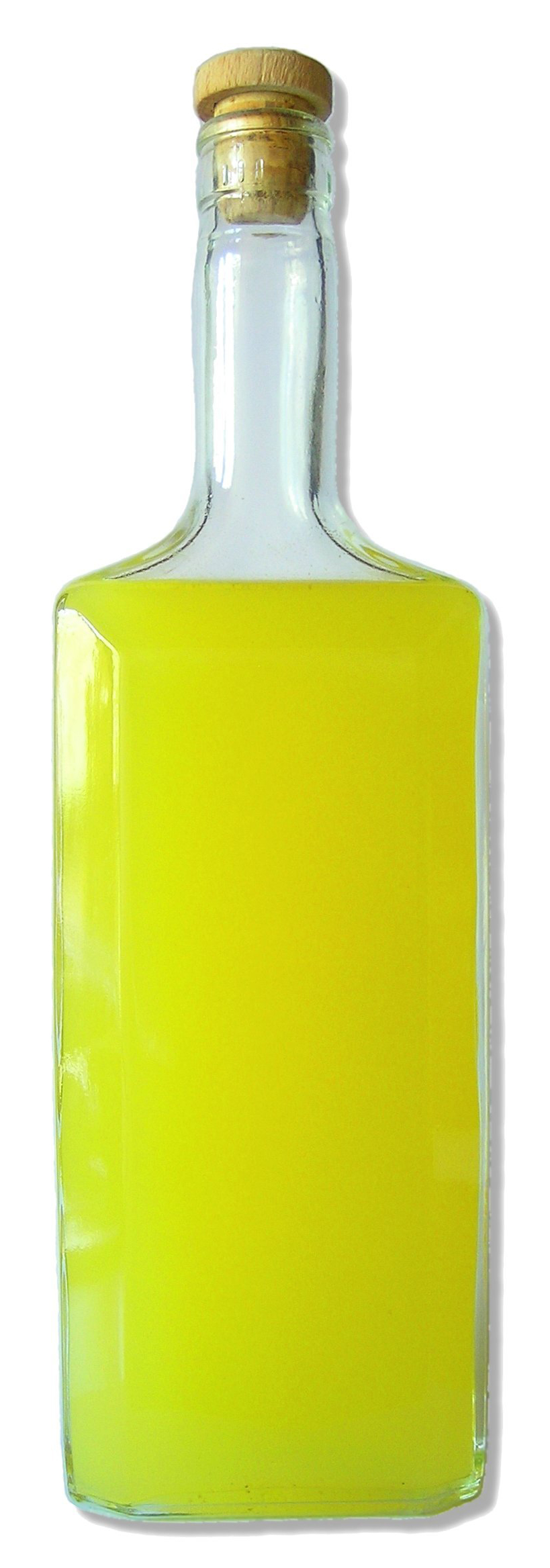
Limoncello

Lemon liqueur is a liqueur made from lemons, liquor, and sugar. It is light to bright lemon yellow in color; intensely lemony in flavor; clear, cloudy, or opaque; and sweet or sweet and sour. Lemon zest is used, water may be added, and the liqueur is not sour. Milk or cream may be added to make a lemon cream liqueur. Lemon juice is not used to alter the taste and affect the stability of the lemon liqueur.

== Production ==
To produce the Lemon liqueur requires sugar, water, lemon zest, liquor, and time to mature. Lemon zest is soaked in high proof neutral spirits to extract from it the lemon oil (an essential oil). The extraction is then diluted with simple syrup.

== Variations ==
Different varieties of lemon are used to produce different flavors. The variety of lemon used is usually dictated by region. Various alcohols can be used to give distinct flavors. A higher proof alcohol maximizes extraction of the lemon flavor, whereas darker alcohols add complexity of flavor. Many commercial brands of lemon liqueur are produced in Italy, in several styles (see Italian liqueur).

== Customs ==
In Italy, especially in Campania, lemon liqueur is consumed as a chaser (ammazzacaffè) to coffee.

== See also ==
- Kitron, a Greek liqueur from citron
- Limoncello, an Italian lemon liqueur
- Lemon Drop, a cocktail
- List of lemon dishes and beverages
- Licor de oro
