= Surform =

Shaping tool

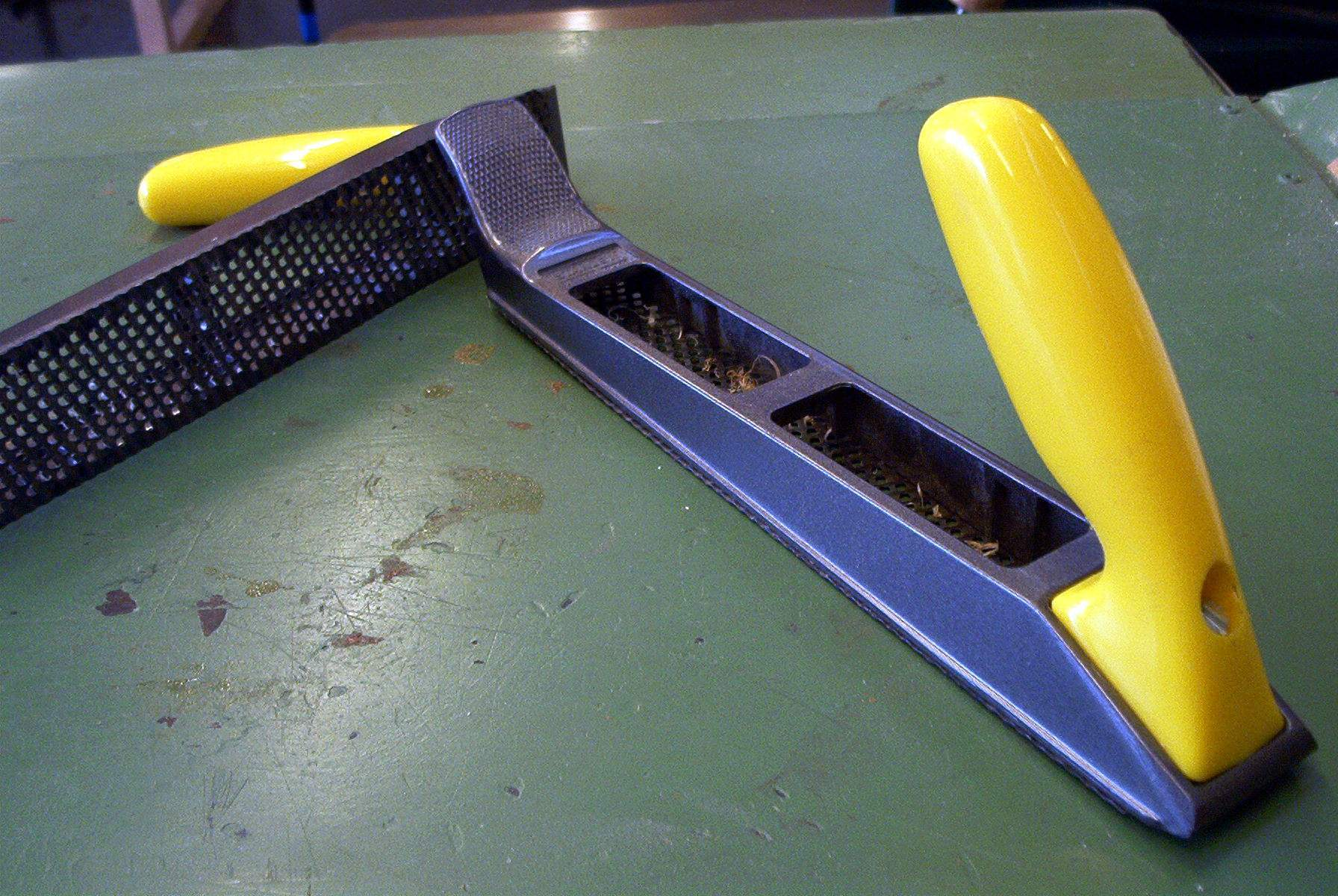
Two Stanley Surform planes

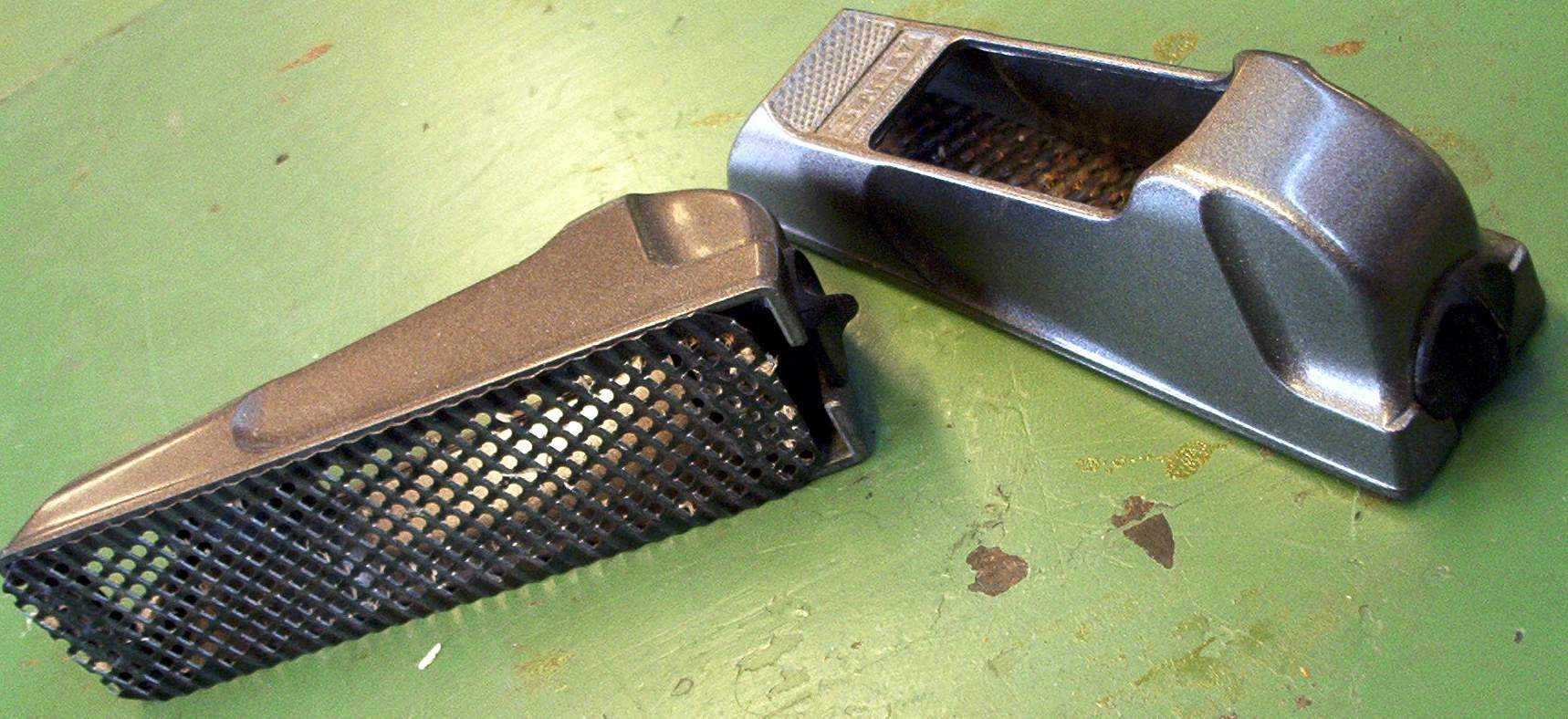
Two Stanley Surform pocket planes

A surform tool (also surface-forming tool) features perforated sheet metal and resembles a food grater. A surform tool consists of a steel strip with holes punched out and the rim of each hole sharpened to form a cutting edge. The strip is mounted in a carriage or handle. Surform tools were called "cheese graters" decades before they entered the market as kitchen utensils used to grate cheese. Surform planes have been described as a cross between a rasp and a plane.

Although similar to many food graters made of perforated sheet metal, surforms differ in having sharpened rims. Also, a surform typically is used to shape material, rather than grate it.

== Etymology and history ==
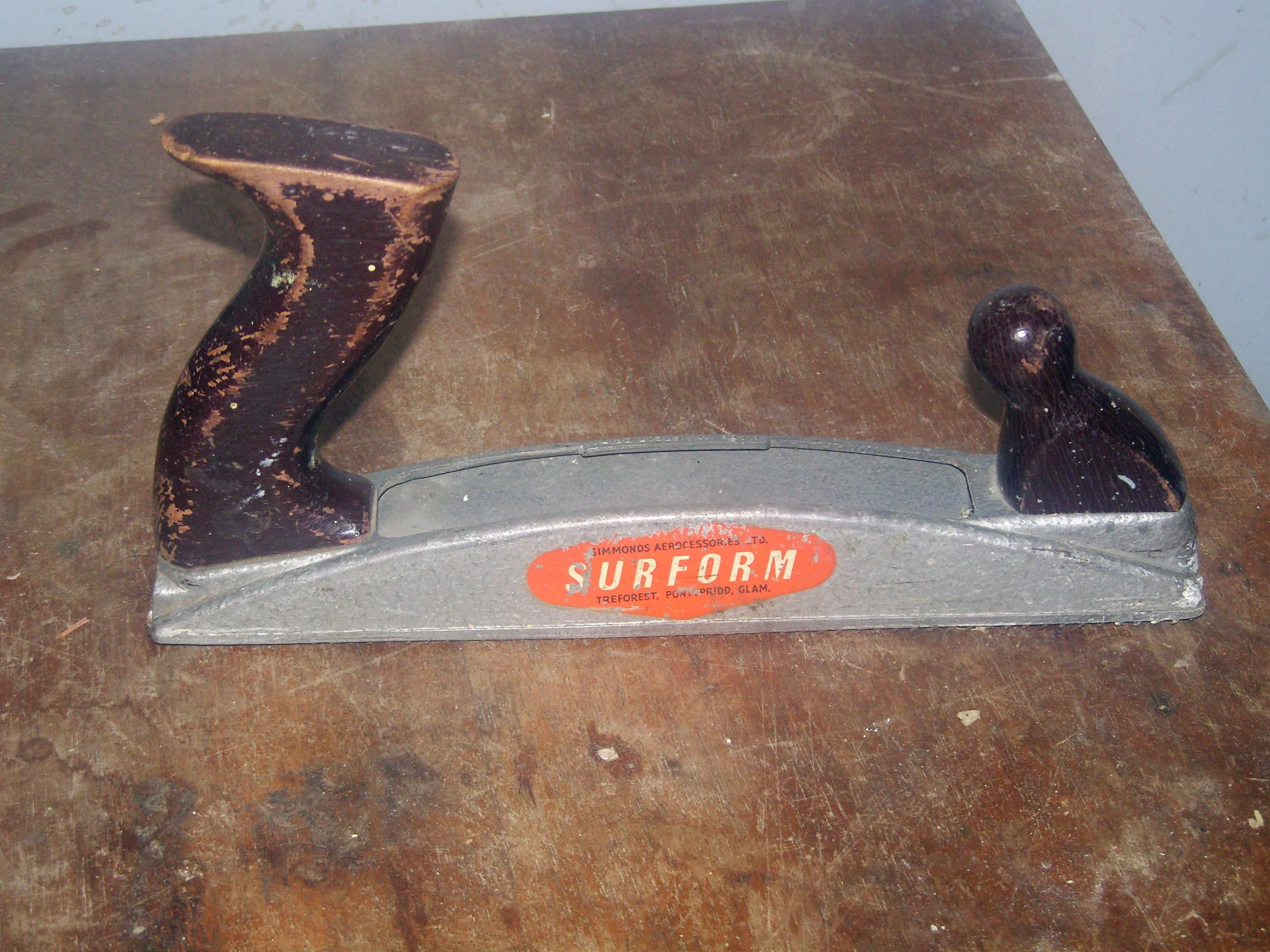
An early Surform tool made by Simmonds Aerocessories Ltd.

The word surform is an apparent portmanteau of "surface" and "form". It is unclear whether this is a genericized trademark or the opposite, a common name that was subsequently trademarked. Surform is a registered trademark of Stanley Black & Decker, Inc. in many countries across the world. Surform was first registered as a trademark in the United Kingdom on 25 September 1953.

The first Surform tools were the invention of a British company. A patent for a Surform tool blade was obtained in 1949 in Australia by Firth Cleveland Pty Ltd of Wolverhampton England. An affiliated UK company, Simmonds Aerocessories Ltd., was an early manufacturer of Surform tools. They made three planes using this blade. These were marketed by another affiliated UK company, British Lead Mills Limited, in or before 1956.

Stanley Works (Stanley) first bought United States manufacturing rights, then bought the company. Stanley began marketing its first surform tools, a plane and a rasp that used the same blade, in 1956. By 1959, Stanley offered a choice of fine and coarse tooth blades. By 1966, the product line had grown to include pocket plane, files (round, half-round, and flat), and an electric drill drum. Reflecting their many uses, Stanley used the slogan "it shaves everything but your beard." A feature of the product line was that on all the tools the blades were replaceable; this was important because the blades could not be sharpened.

Stanley used the name Surform from the start of its marketing campaign in 1956, and became owner of the Surform trademark in Australia in 1967.

Stanley now has several competitors that manufacture surform tools. These include Microplane, a manufacturer of woodworking tools and kitchen utensils; Sherrill, a manufacturer of utensils for working with clay; and G-Rasp, a manufacturer of small kitchen rasps. In addition to its own tools, Microplane markets stainless steel replacement blades that fit some of the Stanley surform tools.

== Types ==
There are several types of surform tools, used to make different shapes. They include flat plane; flat, half-round, and round rasp, and a variety of other shaping/shaving tools. Larger surform tools are designed for two-handed use; smaller ones are for one-handed use.

Although some of these tools are called planes, the United States International Trade Commission has ruled that under the Harmonized Tariff Schedule of the United States they belong to the class of files, rasps, and similar tools.

== Uses ==
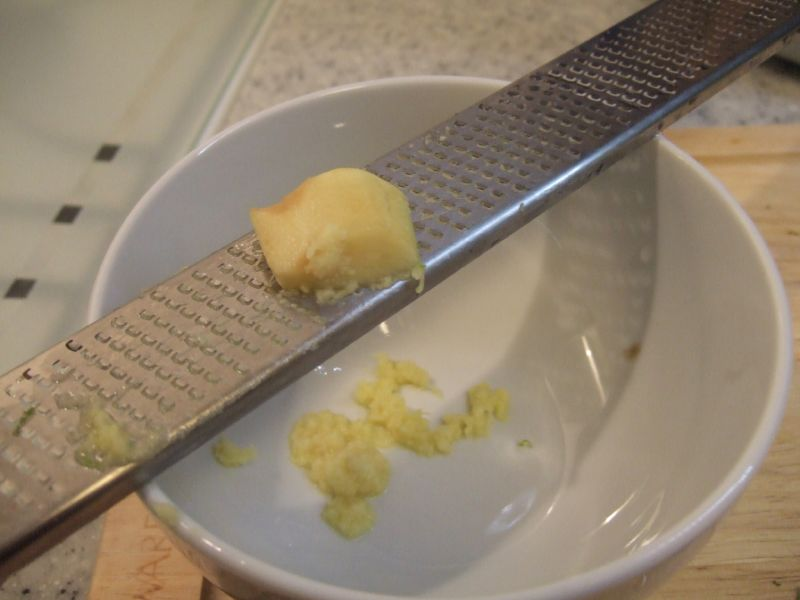
A Microplane surform rasp used to grate fresh ginger

Compared to a conventional rasp or sandpaper, the advantages of a surform rasp include a faster cutting action, no clogging of the tool with material being removed, and little or no dust.

In woodworking, surforms are used for rapidly removing wood from curved surfaces. They remove less wood than a drawknife, so they are easier to control. Even though surforms leave very coarse finishes, the worked areas can be easily smoothed with finer tools, such as files and sanding blocks. Woodworker Sam Maloof described their use in chairmaking: "Once I have roughed out the arm on the bandsaw, I use a Surform® (Stanley® model No. 295). This tool does about the same job as a spokeshave -- it can take off a lot of wood very quickly -- but I can use it without worrying about grain direction."

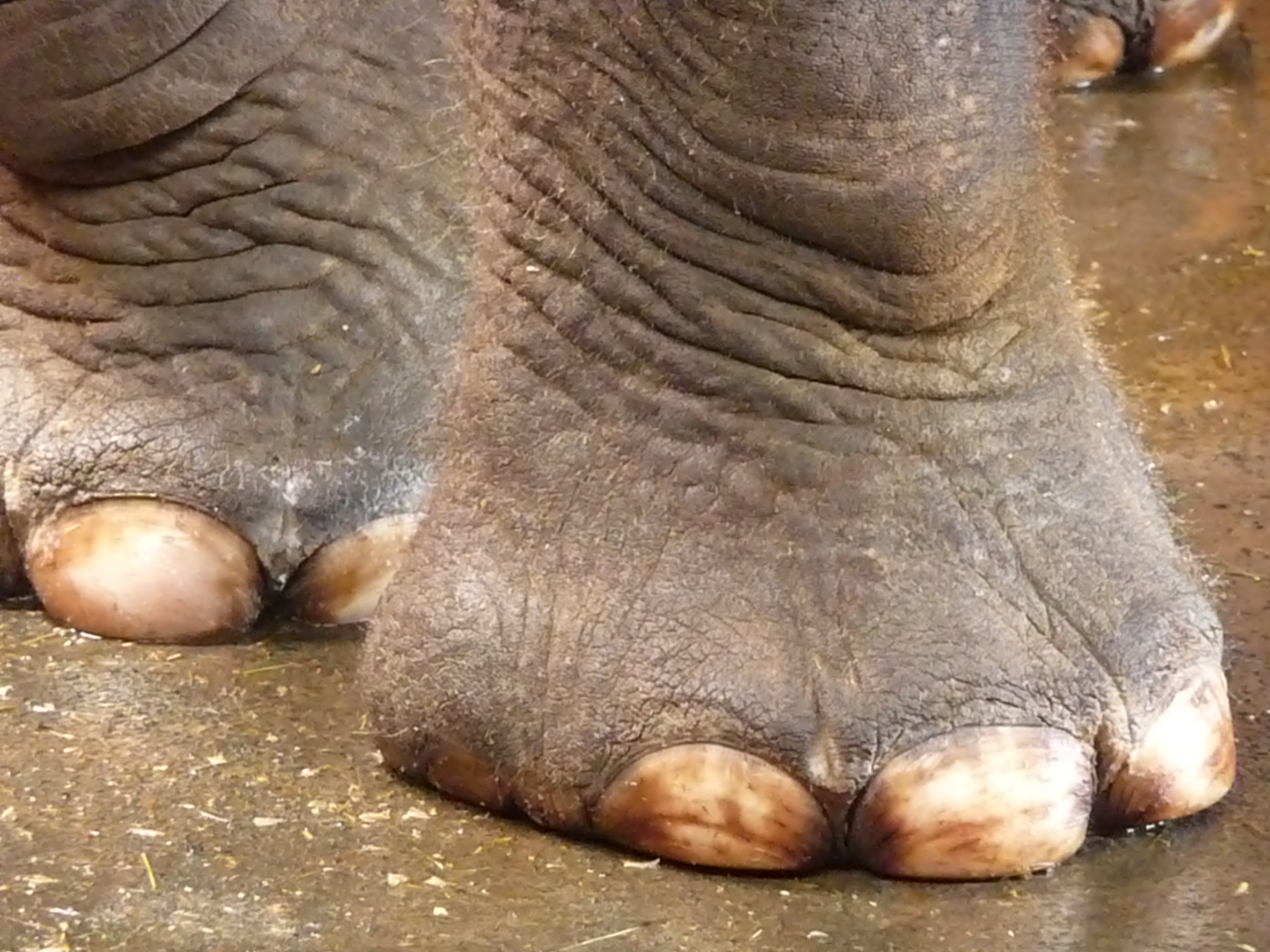
Trimmed nails on an elephant's foot

In farriery, surforms are used to remove excess hoof wall from a horse's hoof. They may also be used to "manicure elephants' hooves".

In horticulture, surforms are used to smooth pruning cuts and shape exposed wood. Surforms are popular among creators of bonsai, especially among those who use deadwood bonsai techniques.

Surforms are used also to shape surfboards, trim drywall, and in sculpture.

In automobile repair shops, for decades panel beaters have used surform files and rasps to shape plastic body filler. There, these surform tools are commonly called "cheese graters".

As kitchen utensils, surform tools are a recent innovation. The Microplane wood rasp, a sleek stainless steel surform rasp first marketed as a woodworking tool and known generically as a microplane, recently became popular as a kitchen utensil for, among other uses, grating cheese (see Zester). An early mention of using a Microplane "rasp-like grater" in the kitchen was a cookbook published in 1999. This was soon followed by mentions such as one of the finest kitchen tools to come along in decades and a miracle citrus zester and hard cheese grater. Initially, it was available from kitchen supply stores and Lee Valley Tools.

== See also ==
- Charles William Hayward
- Oliver Simmonds
