= Microplane =

Brand of grater

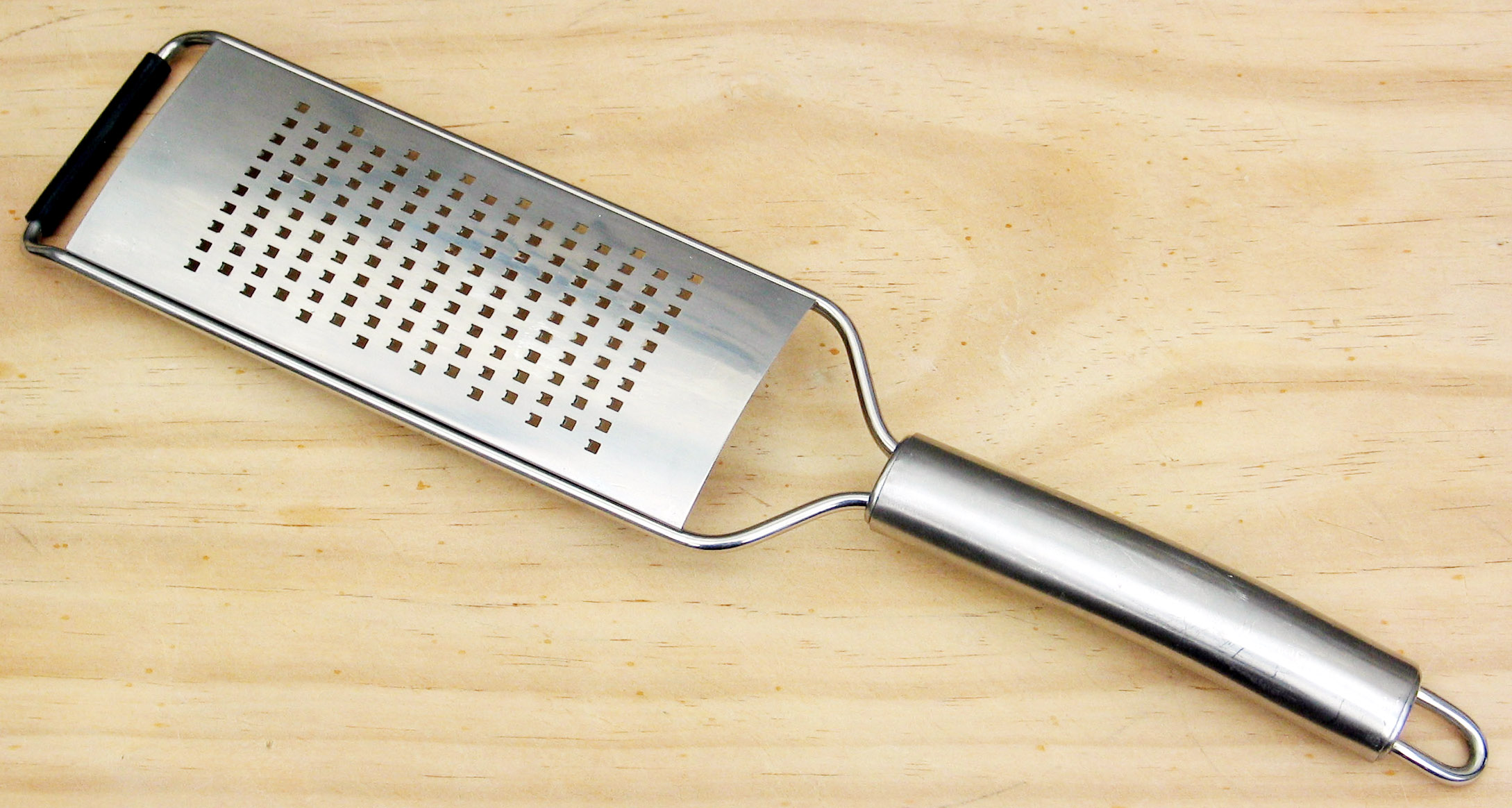
A Microplane grater

Microplane is a registered trademark of Grace Manufacturing Inc., a company that makes photo etched steel tools (surform tools) for grating, grinding and sanding. It was created by brothers Richard & Jeff Grace in the mid-1990s. The Grace brothers set out to make a wood-carving rasp and ended up with a new invention, which in 1991 would come to be called Microplane.

== Kitchen graters ==
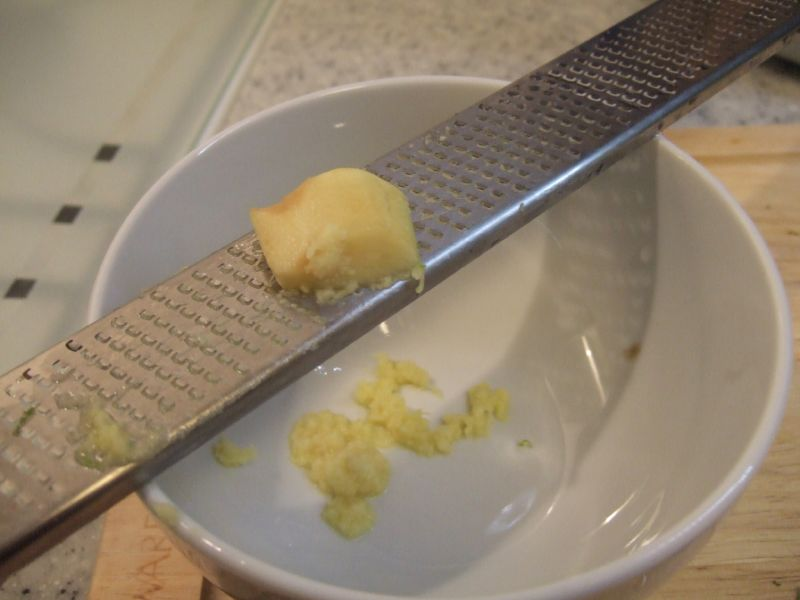
A Microplane grater/zester in use

Microplane graters are used for the grating of various food items, such as nutmeg and cheese, and also as zesters for citrus fruit.

== Wood rasps ==
Microplane originally made wood rasps and shaving disks, and they still do.
