= Kitron =

Citron liqueur produced in Naxos, Greece

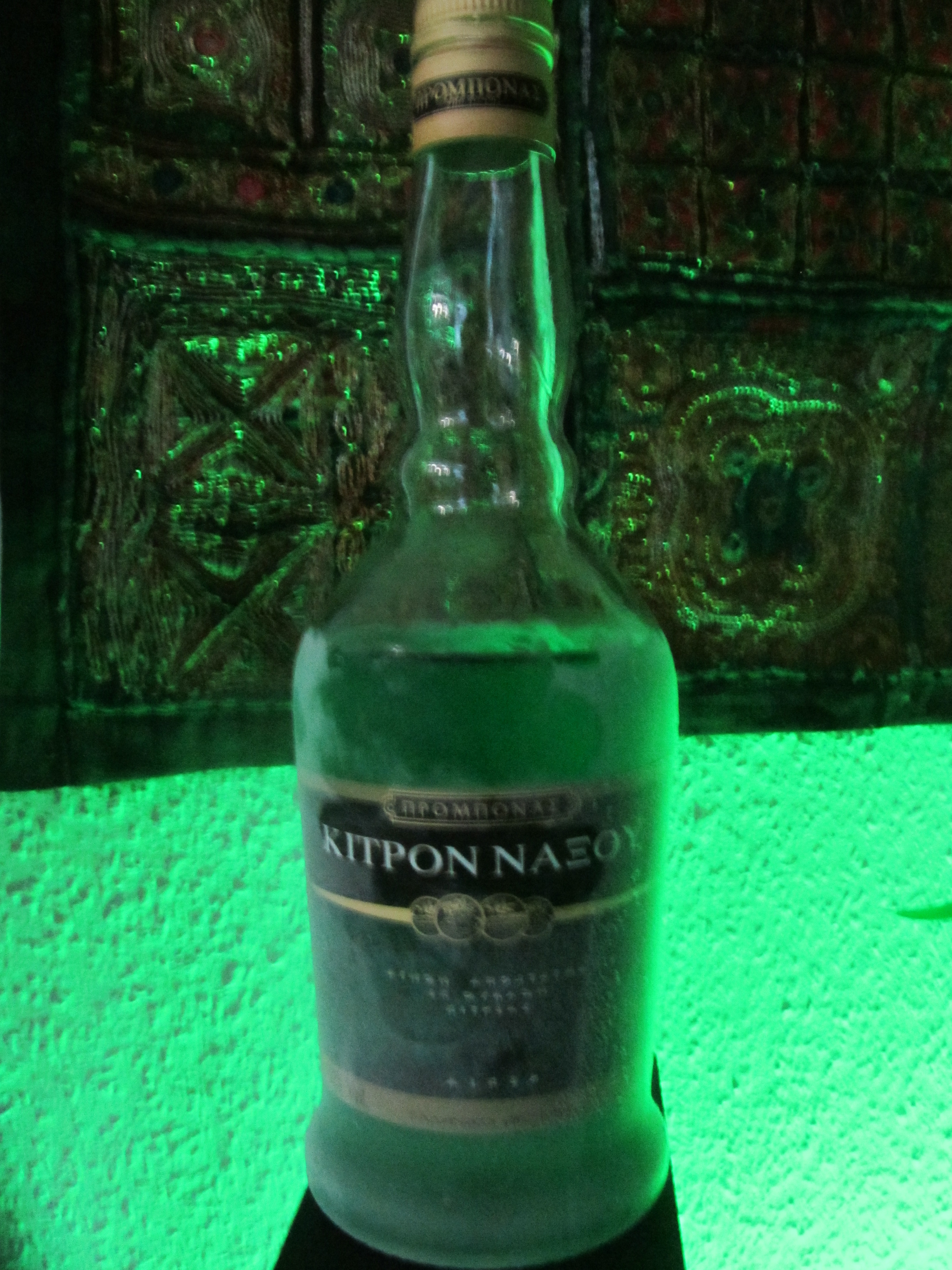
- Bottle of Kitron
- Type: Liqueur
- Origin: Greece
- Introduced: 1896
- Alcohol by volume: 30-40%
- Flavour: citrus

Kitron is a citron liqueur produced on the Greek island of Naxos. It is made from the fruit and leaves of the citron tree, which is similar to the lemon tree but stronger and slightly different in taste.

Kitron comes in three varieties. The green variety is sweeter and contains less alcohol, containing 30% ABV. The yellow-colored variety is the strongest at 36% ABV, and has the least sugar. Colorless Kitron is somewhere in between, at 33% ABV.

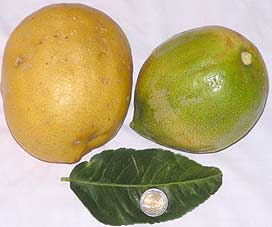
Citron fruits and leaf of Naxos, employed in production of Kitron.

The drink was briefly fashionable during the early 1980s, but today it cannot be easily found outside Naxos due to a shortage of citron trees.

The first distillery was established in 1896 in the village of Halki.

Kitron has a citrusy aroma and flavor, and it is traditionally drunk as a digestif.

== See also ==
- List of lemon dishes and beverages
- Greek citron
