= Lemon tart =

French dessert tart with lemon flavored filling

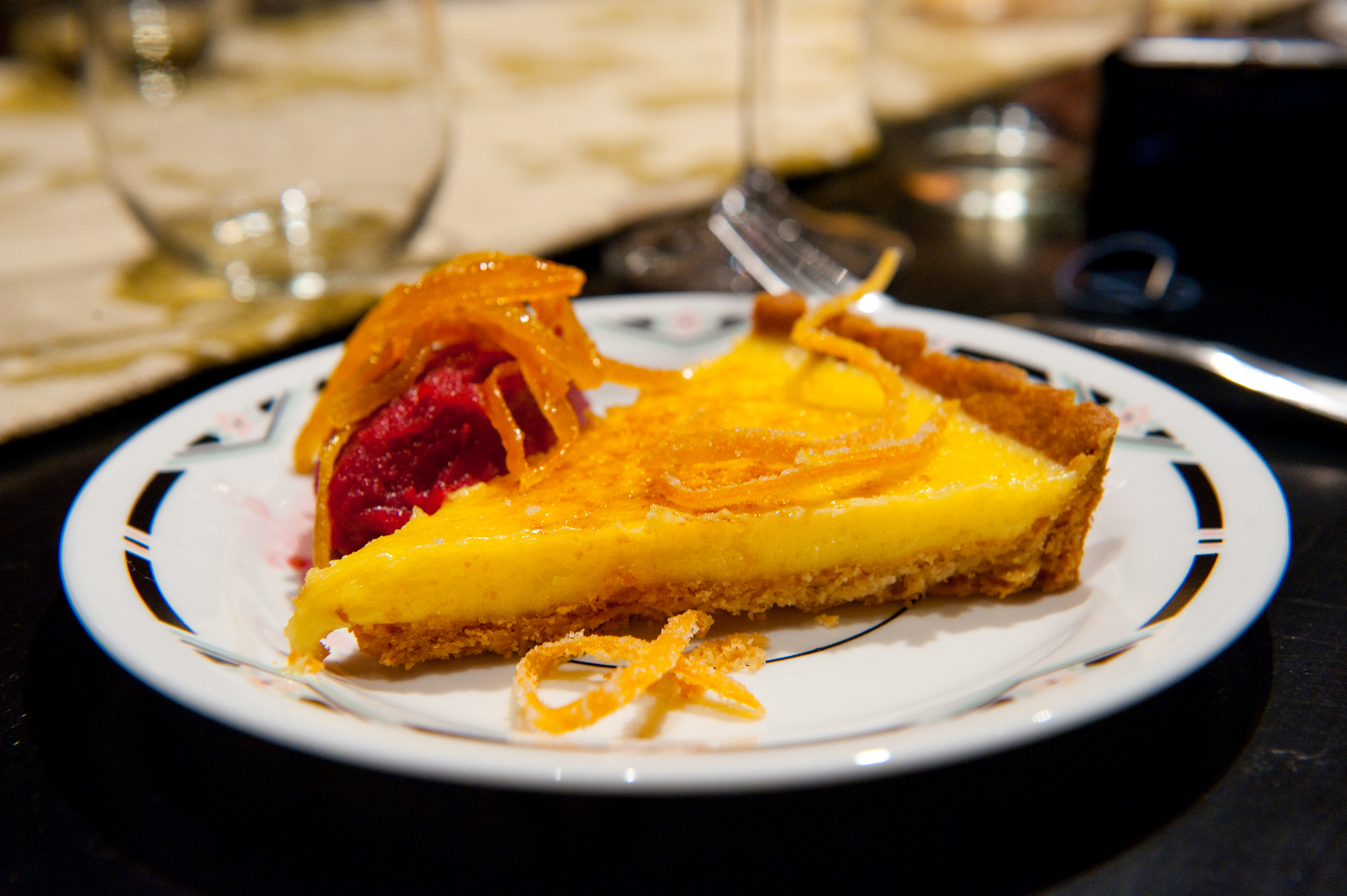
- A served portion of Lemon tart
- Type: Tart
- Place of origin: France
- Main ingredients: shortcrust pastry shell, lemon paste

A lemon tart (French: tarte au citron) is a French dessert dish, a variety of tart. It has a shortcrust pastry shell with a lemon flavored filling.

In the United Kingdom, lemon tart consists of a pastry case (often made in a fluted tart tin) containing a baked lemon custard (usually composed of eggs, sugar, lemon juice and cream). Usually recipes include blind-baking before adding the custard. Sometimes, the tart is dusted with icing sugar prior to serving.

Alternatively, the lemon filling can be cooked in a saucepan and then added to the baked pastry case.

== History ==
The first lemon tart recipes began to emerge in the 18th century, when lemon-based tarts appeared in French cookbooks. It was in 18th- and 19th-century France that the Tarte au Citron evolved into its modern form. French pastry chefs perfected the pairing of pâte sucrée (sweet shortcrust pastry) with a smooth lemon curd filling, resulting in the elegant and minimalist dessert recognized today. Contrary to popular belief, the classic French tarte au citron does not traditionally include a meringue topping. While both meringue-topped and plain versions can be found in French pâtisseries today—with the former often favored for its visual appeal—the original tarte au citron is served without meringue.

== Similar desserts ==
A dessert very similar to the lemon tart is the Shaker lemon pie, usually served for dessert, made with a crust usually made of shortcrust pastry and lemon custard filling. The lemon pie is prepared with a bottom pie crust. Distinct from the Shaker lemon pie is the lemon meringue pie, the latter which has no upper crust but meringue on top instead.

== See also ==
- Lemon bar – Popular American dessert
- List of lemon dishes and drinks
- Lemon meringue pie – Pie topped with meringue
- Shaker lemon pie – Lemon pie from the Midwestern United States
- Key lime pie – American custard pie
