= Montrio Bistro =

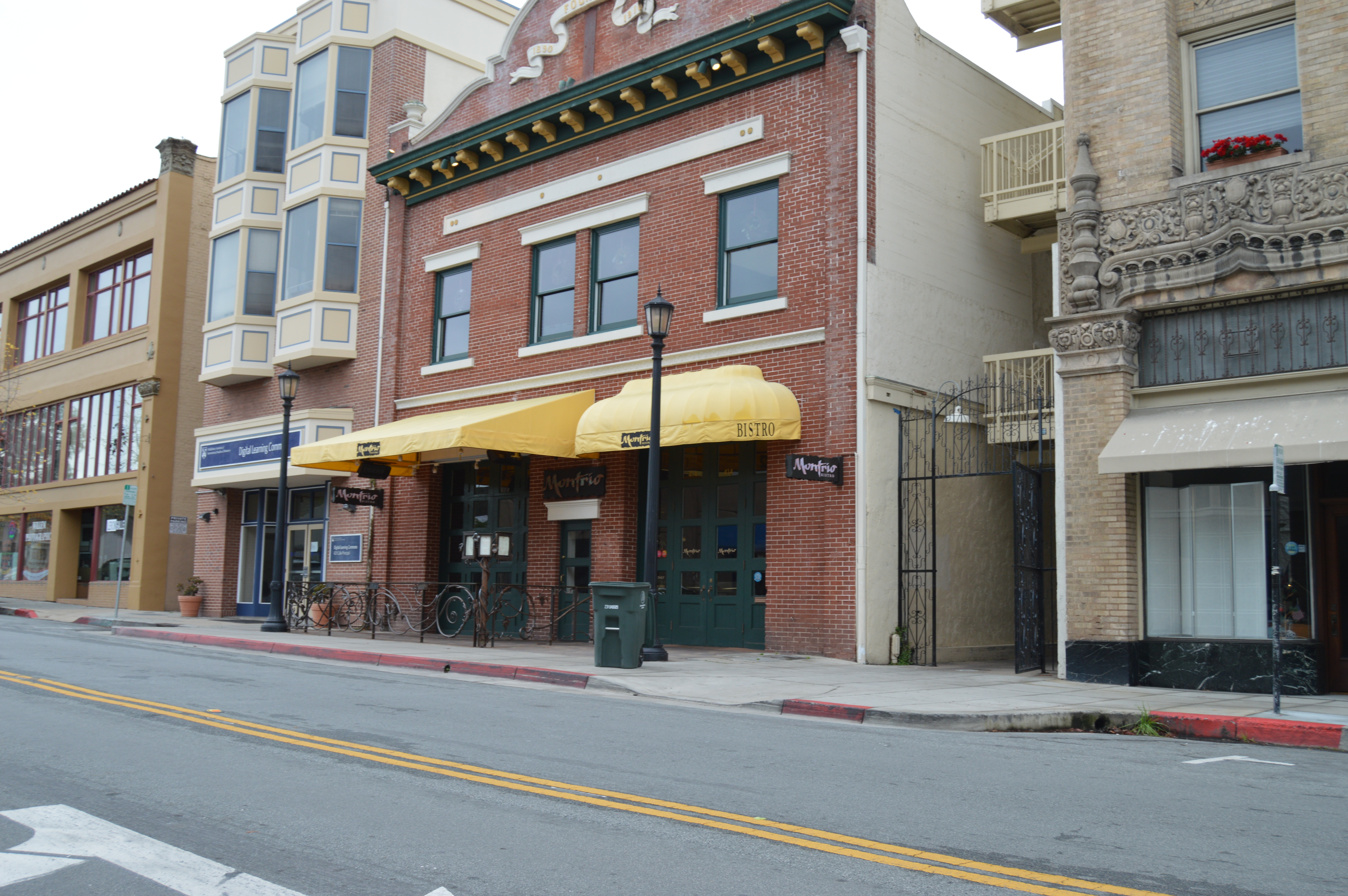
- Interactive map of Montrio Bistro

Restaurant information
- Established: 1995
- Owner: Downtown Dining
- Head chef: Tony Baker
- Chef: Justin Robarge
- Food type: New American cuisine
- Dress code: Casual
- Location: 414 Calle Principal, Monterey, Monterey County, California, 93940, United States
- Coordinates: 36°35′59.29″N 121°53′43.36″W
- Reservations: Yes
- Website: www.montrio.com

Montrio Bistro is a New American restaurant in Monterey, California in the United States.

== History ==
Montrio Bistro was started in 1995 and is located in a brick firehouse, the first in Monterey, built in 1910. The first chef was Brian Whitmore. That opening year, the restaurant was named "Restaurant of the Year" by Esquire. Tony Baker serves as head chef and Anthony Vitacca is the bar manager. In 2010, the restaurant became one of the first in Monterey County to install an ultraviolet-treated water filter system, ending the restaurant's reliance on filtered bottled water. The restaurant installed a new sidewalk patio in 2015. Justin Robarge, former sous chef of Deetjen's Big Sur Inn and Cannery Row Brewing Company, became sous chef de cuisine in 2018, replacing Bryan Copp. That same year, the restaurant introduced a tipping program enabling guests to send staff an alcoholic beverage to drink after their work shift is over. The bistro is listed as a two-star green restaurant by the Green Restaurant Association.

== Design and ambiance ==
The bistro comprises a dining room, bar and sidewalk patio. Sculptures of clouds hang from the ceiling with pipes twisting between them. Frommers calls Montrio Bistro's decor "downright odd" and looking "like a space created by a designer with "Cirque du Soleil" ambitions." Each table at the restaurant is lined with craft paper and has crayons for children. The restaurant has a display kitchen.

== Cuisine and cocktails ==
The menu at Montrio Bistro is New American. Ingredients include seasonal, locally sourced herbs, salts, vegetables and fruits, and housemade English-style bacon. The restaurant is a member of the Seafood Watch program. The menu changes frequently based on available ingredients. Small dishes have included white anchovies, oxtail risotto with fava beans, bacon and egg salad, and oatmeal-crusted brie. Medium and large dishes have included roast duck breast, artichoke ravioli, grilled quail, grilled peaches and burrata, wood roasted brick chicken with spiced green beans, a bacon-wrapped pork tenderloin with shredded pork ("Pork Trio") and herb-crusted Arctic char. Desserts have included carrot cake with coconut cream cheese ice cream and lemon curd brulee.

The restaurant's cocktail menu also uses seasonal ingredients. Bar manager Anthony Vitacca makes classic and "farm-to-glass" cocktails. He visits local farmers markets weekly to purchase ingredients, many which he uses to infuse simple syrups, vodkas and gins. He makes his own maraschino cherries from local orchards. "Beta Vulgaris" is a beet juice-based drink, comprising beet, St-Germain, Chartreuse, and lemon. The whiskey-based "Saving Private Ryan" comprises brown butter bourbon, walnut liqueur, chicory pecan bitters, and smoked ice. The "Corazon Valiente" is made with Del Maguey mezcal, blackberry-plum shrub and organic agave. The bistro also has a mocktail menu.

== Reception ==
Frommers praises the friendliness of the staff and the restaurant's focus on using unique and fresh ingredients. They described the interior as "odd" and describe the food as "hit or miss of late." In 2012, Montrio Bistro was named best restaurant in Monterey in the Monterey County Weekly. In 2018, the restaurant was named the fourth "greenest" restaurant in Monterey by the San Francisco Chronicle.
