= Friend of History Award =

The Friend of History Award is an award given by the Organization of American Historians (OAH). The award was first presented in 2005. It is not a monetary award and is granted annually.

== Purpose ==
Friend of History Award "recognizes an individual, who is not a professional historian, or an institution or organization for outstanding support for the pursuit of historical research, for the public presentation of history, or for the work of the OAH."

== Recipients ==
Source: Organization of American Historians

- 2005: Seymour G. Sternberg, New York Life Insurance Company
- 2005: Gilder Lehrman Institute of American History
- 2006: Geoffrey C. Ward, Independent Scholar
- 2007: Senator Robert C. Byrd
- 2007: Libby O'Connell and The History Channel
- 2008: Ruth J. Simmons, president, Brown University
- 2009: Brian P. Lamb, founder and CEO, C-SPAN, host of Booknotes
- 2010: Newberry Library
- 2011: Jay S. Goodgold, Independent Investor
- 2012: No award given
- 2013: The almost 85,000 participants in the U.S. Department of Education's Teaching American History Program
- 2014: Stephen A. Briganti, president and chief executive officer, Statue of Liberty-Ellis Island Foundation
- 2015: Colin G. Campbell, chairman emeritus, Colonial Williamsburg Foundation
- 2016: NASA Johnson Space Center History Office
- 2017: Lonnie G. Bunch III, National Museum of African American History and Culture
- 2018: Civil War Trust
- 2019: Natasha Trethewey, Northwestern University
- 2020: Ulysses S. Grant Association
- 2021: Refusing to Forget
- 2022: Made by History
- 2023: Angel Island Immigration Station Foundation
- 2024: National History Day
- 2025: John E. Pepper Jr.

== See also ==
- List of history awards
