= John E. Pepper Jr. =

American businessman (born 1938)

- Born: August 2, 1938 (age 88); Pottsville, Pennsylvania, U.S.
- Occupation: Businessman
- Years active: 1963–2012
- Title: Chairman of The Walt Disney Company (2007–2012)
- Term: January 1, 2007 – March 13, 2012
- Predecessor: George J. Mitchell
- Successor: Bob Iger
- Board member of: The Walt Disney Company
- Spouse: Frances G. Pepper
- Children: 4, including David

John E. Pepper Jr. (born August 2, 1938) is an American businessman. He was chief executive officer and/or chairman of Procter & Gamble from 1995 to 2002. He was also CEO of the National Underground Railroad Freedom Center, and until 2012 was the chairman of The Walt Disney Company.

== Biography ==
John E. Pepper Jr. was born August 2, 1938, in Pottsville, Pennsylvania. He graduated from Portsmouth Abbey School (then Portsmouth Priory) in Rhode Island, then graduated from Yale University in 1960, where he was on the board of the Yale Daily News.

From 1963 to 2003, he worked in various positions at Procter & Gamble, including chairman of the board from 2000 to 2002, and CEO. He was chairman of the executive committee of the board of directors of The Procter & Gamble Company until December 2003. He then was vice president of finance and administration at Yale University from January 2004 to December 2005. He was a director of The Walt Disney Company beginning in 2006 (chairman from 2007 to 2012) and of Boloco from 2007 to 2015, a Boston-based restaurant chain that his son John co-founded in 1997.

He was a fellow of the Yale Corporation from 1995 to 2003, including two years as senior fellow, and also was a member of the advisory committee of the Yale School of Management. He is on the board of trustees of Xavier University. He also is on the boards of Boston Scientific and Motorola. He is a member of the executive committee of the Cincinnati Youth Collaborative, and he sits on the boards of the National Campaign to Prevent Teen Pregnancy and the Partnership for a Drug-Free America. He was inducted into the Junior Achievement U.S. Business Hall of Fame in 2008.

His children include Cincinnati politician David Pepper and North Carolina bluegrass musician Susan Pepper, as well as entrepreneur, labor activist and drone pilot John Pepper and kitesurfer Doug Pepper.

In 2025, he was awarded the Friend of History Award by the Organization of American Historians.

== Bibliography ==
- What Really Matters (Yale University Press, 2007)

== Awards and honors ==
- Friend of History Award (2025)

Business positions
Preceded by George J. Mitchell	Disney chairman January 1, 2007–March 13, 2012	Succeeded by Bob Iger
