= Kabkabou =

Tunisian fish stew

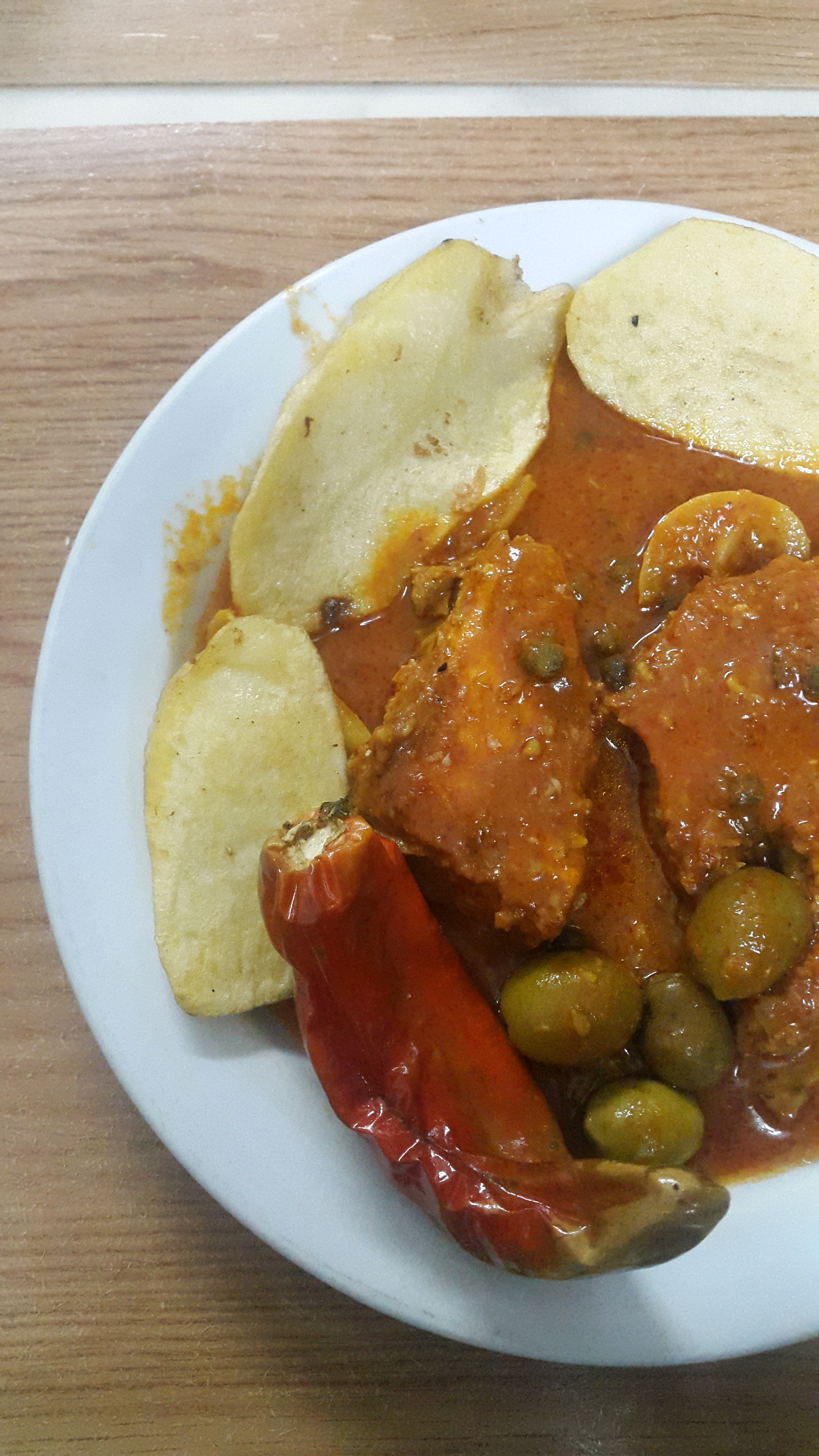
- Alternative names: Kabkabu
- Type: Stew
- Place of origin: Tunisia
- Region or state: Sfax
- Main ingredients: onion, olive oil, tomato paste, garlic, harissa, salt, pepper, cumin, caper, lemon, pitted black olives, pitted green olives, saffron

Kabkabou or Kabkabu (Arabic: كبكابو) is a fish and tomato stew traditionally prepared in Tunisia. The dish consists of a sauce in which fish steak is cooked, and capers, olives and lemons are added. Many species of fish are used, such as grouper, angel shark, tuna or mackerel. The main ingredients used in the preparation are onion, olive oil, tomato paste, garlic, harissa, salt, pepper, cumin, caper, lemon, pitted black olives, pitted green olives and saffron.

== See also ==
- List of African dishes
- List of lemon dishes and beverages
- List of steak dishes
