= Shaker lemon pie =

Lemon pie from the Midwestern United States

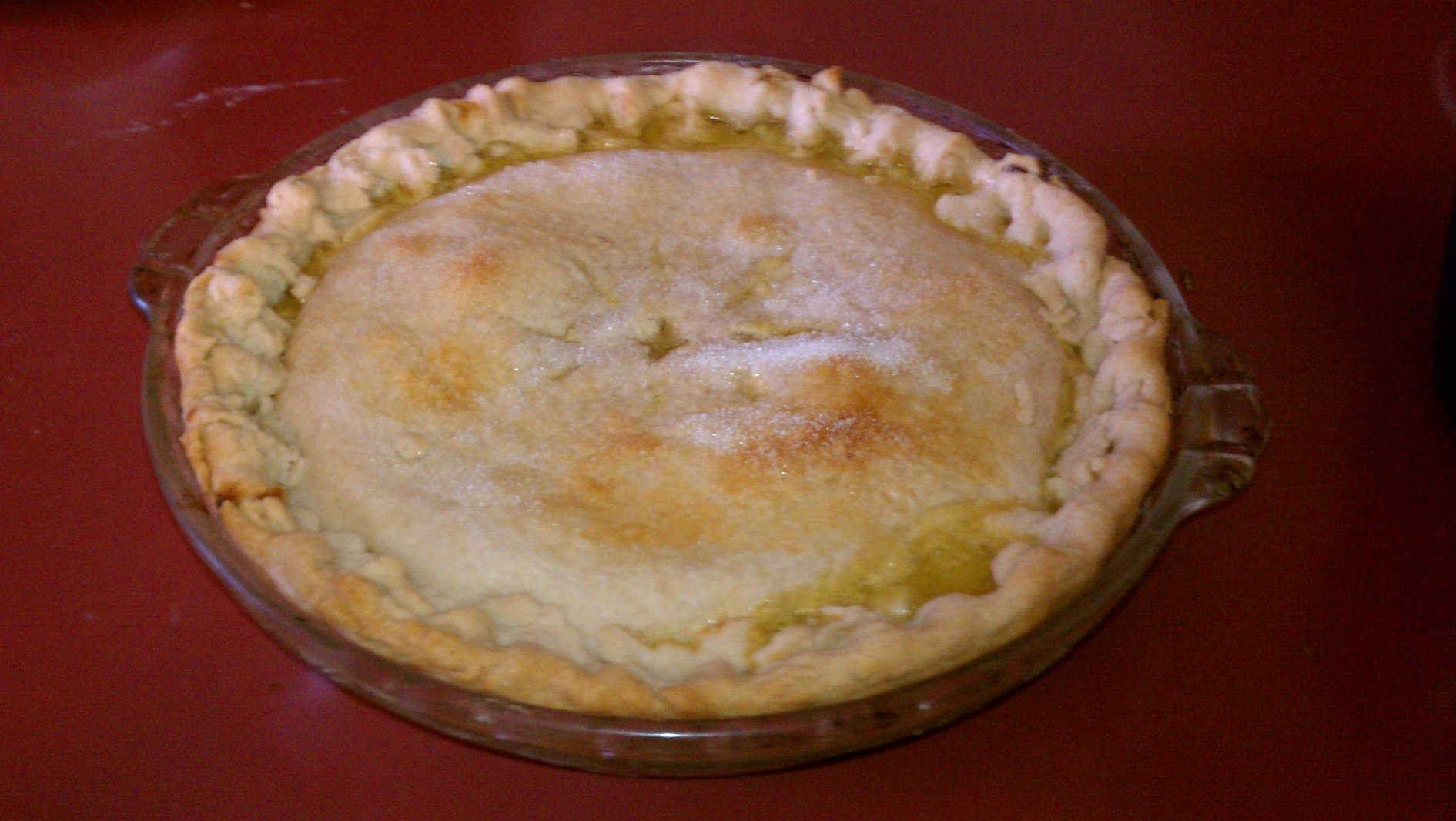
- Traditional Shaker lemon pie
- Alternative names: Ohio lemon pie
- Type: Pie
- Place of origin: United States
- Region or state: Midwestern United States
- Serving temperature: Warm
- Main ingredients: lemons, white sugar, and eggs

Shaker lemon pie, also known as Ohio lemon pie, is a fruit pie typical of the Midwestern United States. Shaker lemon pie is notable in that it uses all parts of the lemon except for the seeds.

== Origin ==
The pie was first made in the religious communities of Shakers during the early 1800s. Their success at fruit-growing led to the development of what has been called "a veritable calendar of pies". In the Midwestern climate, however, lemons could not be grown, and cookbook author Caroline Piercy writes that "according to old accounts, lemons were the first food ever purchased by North Union." Two versions of the lemon pie developed, one resembling a standard lemon meringue pie, the other, more frugal version using the whole lemon.

== Preparation ==
The original pie filling recipe calls for ordinary lemons, white sugar, and eggs. The entire lemon including peel is sliced paper thin, gently mixed with sugar, and left to macerate for at least four hours and up to a full day, "the longer the better". During this time the mixture should be stirred every few hours, and any seeds picked out. The sugar will dissolve and the peel will soften. The beaten eggs are then mixed in, the filling added to the crust, either a lattice or full top crust added, and the pie baked. The resulting filling is a cross between marmalade and lemon curd.

Modern variations may substitute Meyer lemons or brown sugar and add other flavorings such as ginger or blackberries.

== See also ==
- List of pies, tarts and flans
- List of lemon dishes and beverages
