= Lemon chicken =

Name of several dishes featuring chicken and lemon

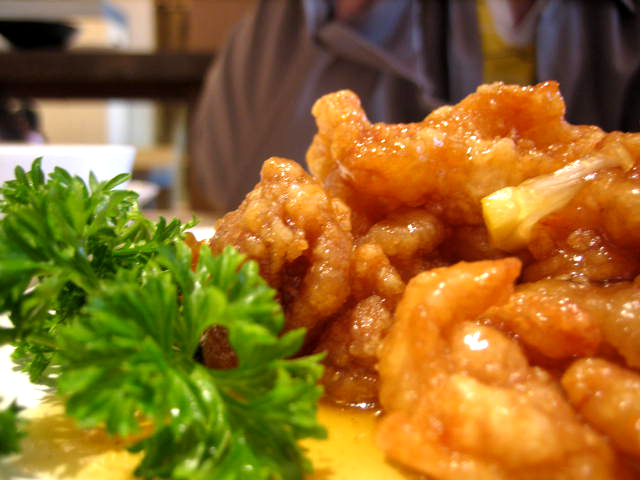
- A plate of Chinese-style lemon chicken
- Course: Main
- Main ingredients: Chicken; Lemon sauce

Lemon chicken
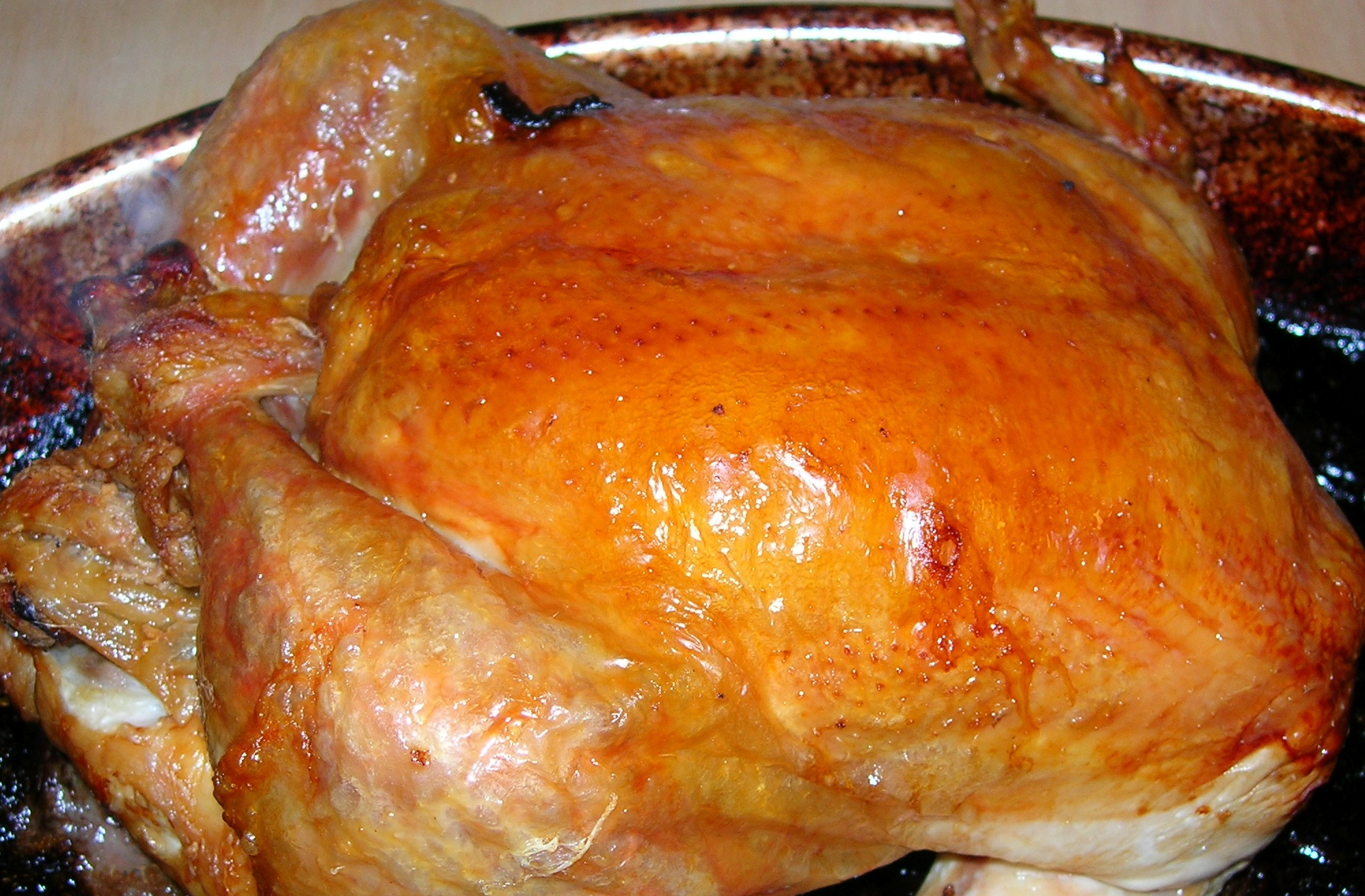
- Lemon and garlic roasted chicken
- Traditional Chinese: 檸檬雞
- Simplified Chinese: 柠檬鸡
Transcriptions
Standard Mandarin
- Hanyu Pinyin: níng méng jī
- Bopomofo: ㄋㄧㄥ´ ㄇㄥ´ ㄐㄧ
Yue: Cantonese
- Jyutping: ning4 mung1 gai1

Lemon chicken is the name of several dishes found in cuisines around the world which include chicken and lemon.

In American-, Canadian-, Australasian-, and British-Chinese cuisine, it usually consists of pieces of chicken meat that are sautéed or battered and deep-fried and coated with a thick, sweet lemon-flavored sauce. The Chinese restaurant of the Panda Hotel in Tsuen Wan, Hong Kong used to serve its version of lemon chicken with the chicken pieces coated in batter, then rolled in almond slivers and deep-fried and served with the lemon-glaze sauce.

== Similarly named dishes ==
Lemon chicken in Italy (pollo al limone) and Greece (κοτόπουλο λεμονάτο) consists of a whole chicken pan-roasted with white wine, lemon juice, fresh thyme and mirepoix.

In Spain, a similar dish, pollo al romero con limón y piñones also includes pine nuts, rosemary and ham.

French poulet au citron includes Dijon mustard in the sauce, and is accompanied by roasted potatoes.

== See also ==
- Orange chicken
- Pineapple chicken
- List of chicken dishes
- List of lemon dishes and beverages
