= Lemon ice box pie =

American dessert

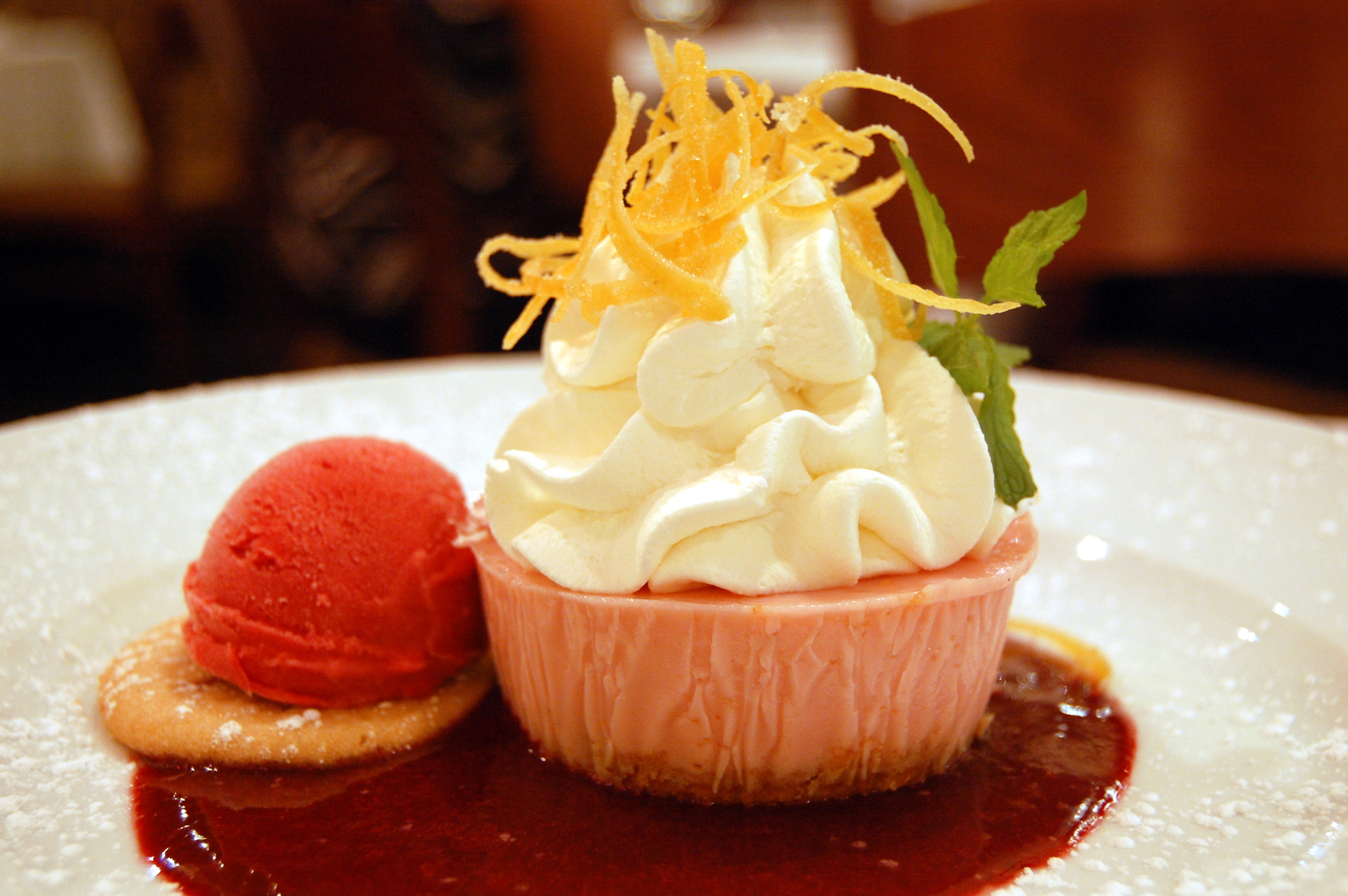
- Lemon ice box pie with raspberry sorbet and raspberry sauce
- Type: Icebox pie
- Course: Dessert
- Place of origin: United States
- Main ingredients: Pie crust (graham crackers, butter), lemon juice, eggs, condensed milk

Lemon ice box pie is an icebox pie consisting of lemon juice, eggs, and condensed milk in a pie crust, frequently made of graham crackers and butter. It is a variant of key lime pie; in both, the citric acidity sets the egg yolks, with minimal baking. There are also no bake versions.

== History ==
No-bake icebox pies like the lemon icebox pie first became features of American cuisine in the 1930s, becoming more popular in the 1950s and 1960s as refrigerators became a standard item of the American kitchen. They are associated with the food traditions of the cuisine of the Southern United States.

A 1936 recipe for stovetop lemon icebox pie was made by combining flour, cornstarch and sugar in a double boiler and gradually adding water to create a smooth batter, adding butter and stirring constantly. Egg yolks are stirred in and briefly cooked, then the mixture is taken off the heat and the lemon zest and juice are added, whipped egg whites are folded in, and the mixture is set aside to cool, then poured into a pie dish lined with ladyfingers or vanilla wafers. The pie is chilled in the refrigerator and topped with whipped cream before serving.

== Preparation ==
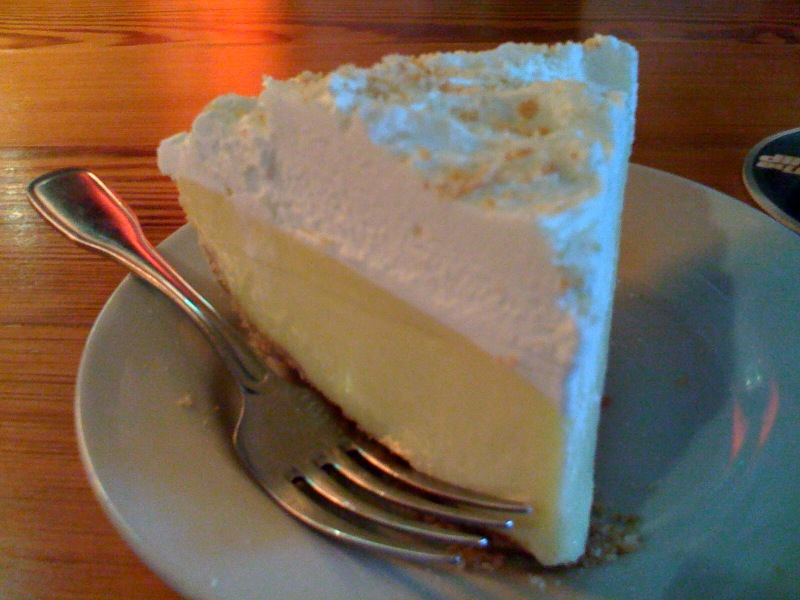
A slice of typical ice box pie

To make the pie, sweetened condensed milk is whisked with fresh lemon juice and cream cheese. Separately, the egg yolks are whisked with the lemon zest until they become pale in color, then the condensed milk mixture is added gradually to the eggs. The crust can be made with vanilla wafers that are combined with melted butter and sugar until the consistency of wet sand, then pressed into a pie pan to form a crust. The crust is lightly baked, then filled with the filling. The pie is baked gently and allowed to set for several hours in the refrigerator. Before serving, it is topped with fresh whipped cream that can be flavored with lemon zest.

The classic version of the no bake pie was made with eggs. Although cooks of that era said "the lemon juice has the effect of cooking the eggs", the modern day recommendation is to heat the raw egg yolk briefly on the stovetop.

No bake versions can be made without eggs. The filling has been described as "light and delicate in flavor" and is made with just three ingredients: condensed milk, lemon zest and fresh lemon juice.

== See also ==
- List of lemon dishes and beverages
