= List of lemon dishes and drinks =

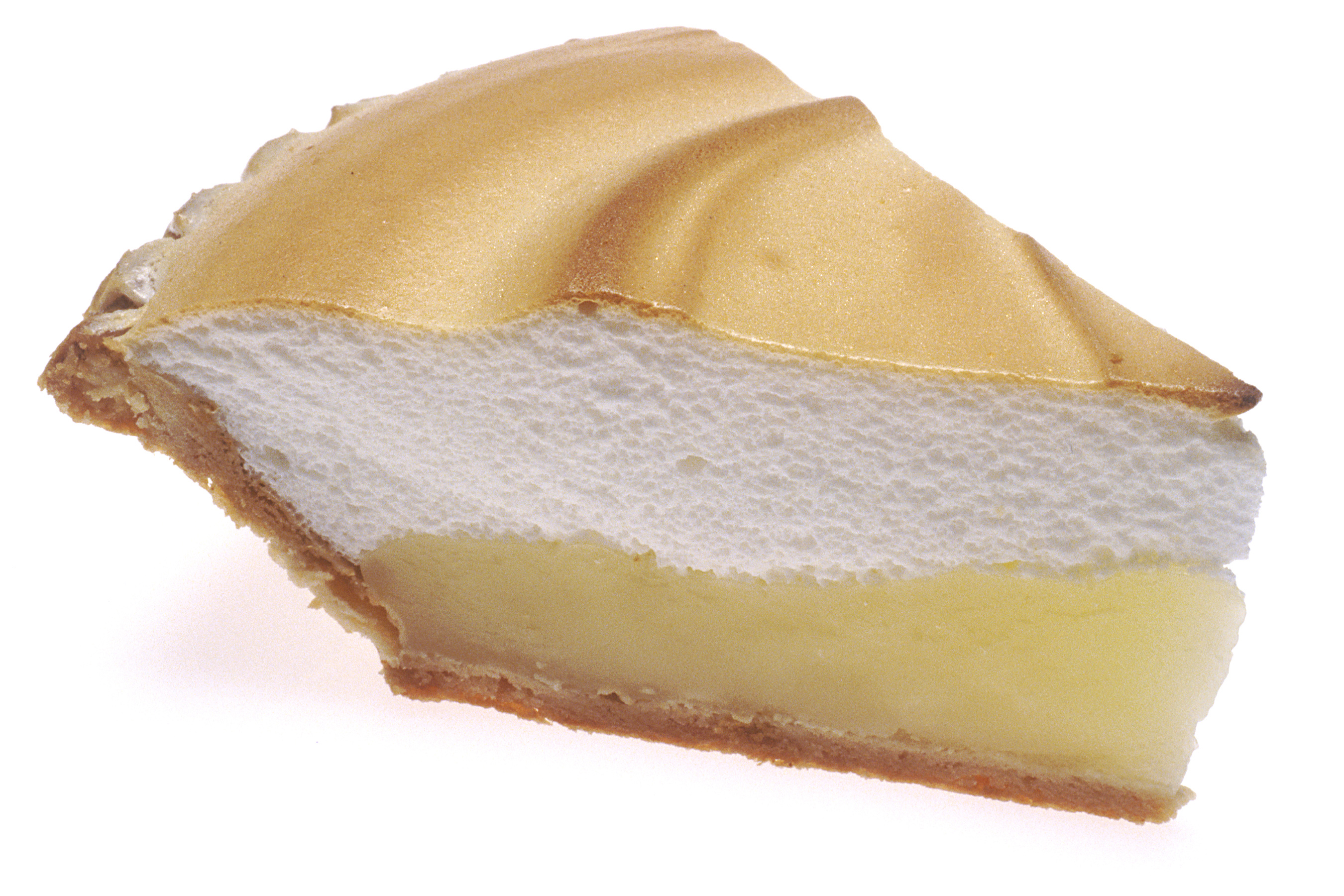
Lemon meringue pie

This is a list of lemon dishes and drinks, in which lemon is used as a primary ingredient. Lemon is a small evergreen tree native to Asia, and the tree's ellipsoidal yellow fruit. The fruit is used for culinary and non-culinary purposes throughout the world, primarily for its juice, though the pulp and rind (zest) are also used in cooking.

== Lemon dishes ==
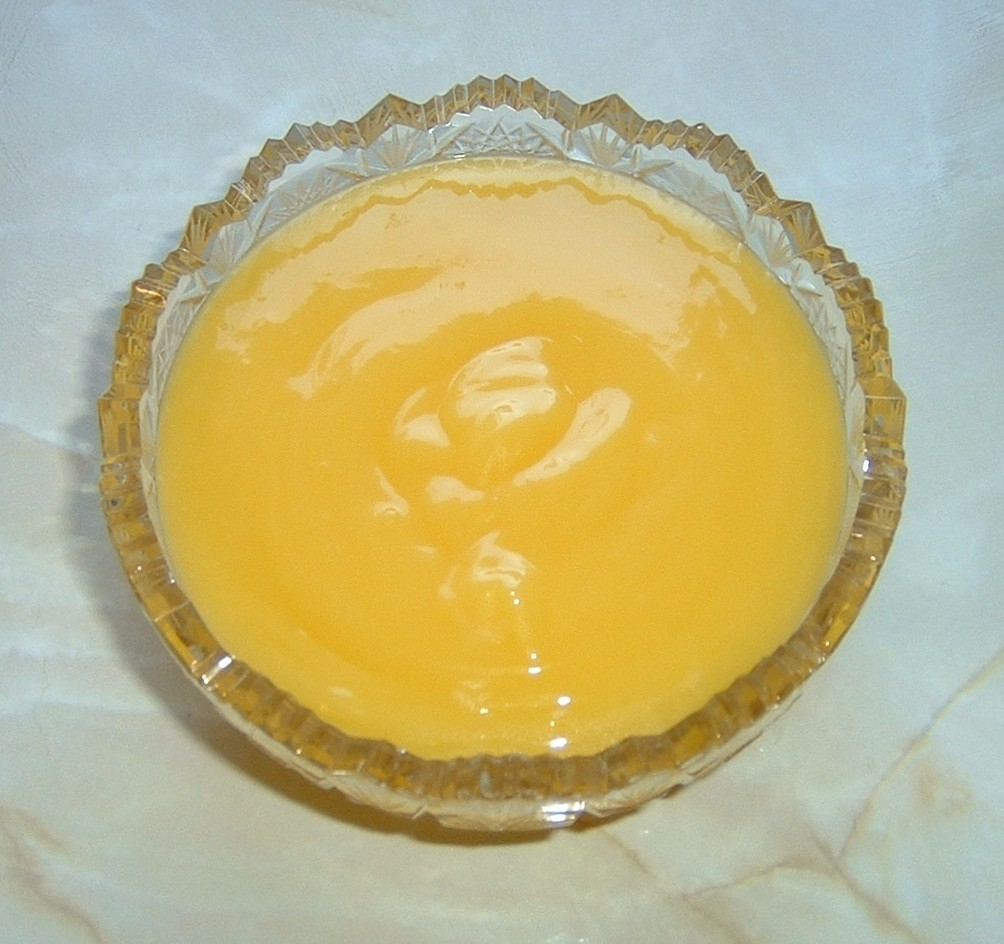
Homemade lemon curd

- Atlantic Beach pie
- Fruit curd – dessert spread and topping usually made with lemon, lime, orange or raspberry.
- Lemon bar – Popular American dessert
- Lemon chicken – name of several dishes found in cuisines around the world which include chicken and lemon.
- Lemon chiffon cake – very light cake that may include the juice and zest of lemons.
- Lemon ice box pie – dessert consisting of lemon juice, eggs, and condensed milk in a pie crust, frequently made of graham crackers and butter.
- Lemon ice cream – Flavor of ice cream
- Lemon meringue pie – baked pie, usually served for dessert, made with a crust usually made of shortcrust pastry, lemon custard filling and a fluffy meringue topping.
- Lemon pickle – Lemon pickle is made primarily from lemon along with spices in India.
- Lemon tart – dessert dish that's a variation of a tart. They have a normal, crimped, versatile pastry shell, while the filling is a basic variation of lemon paste.
- Shaker Lemon Pie – type of lemon pie first developed by the Shakers.
- Sussex Pond Pudding – traditional English pudding consisting of a whole lemon encased in suet pastry.
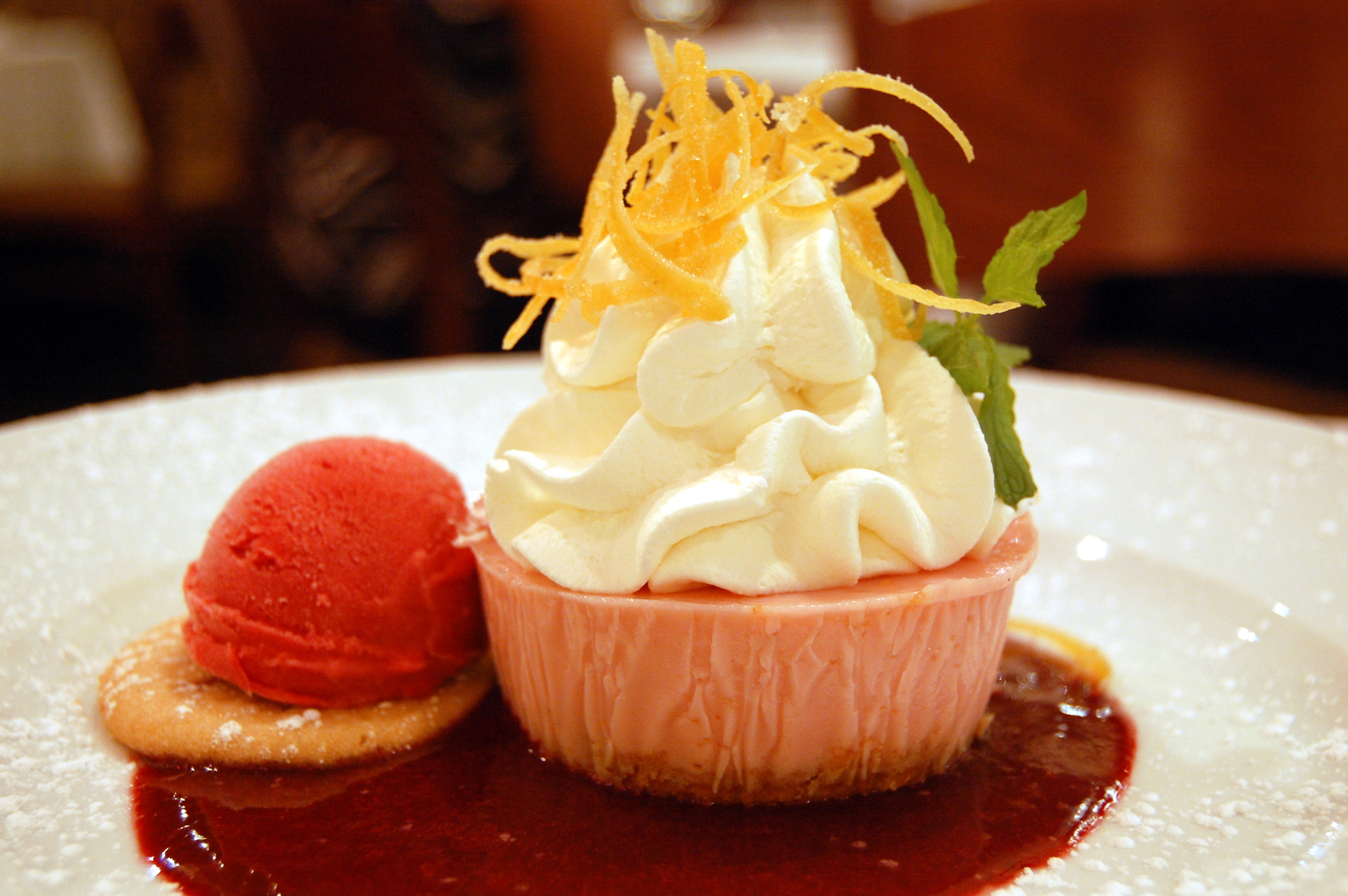
Lemon ice box pie with raspberry sorbet and raspberry sauce

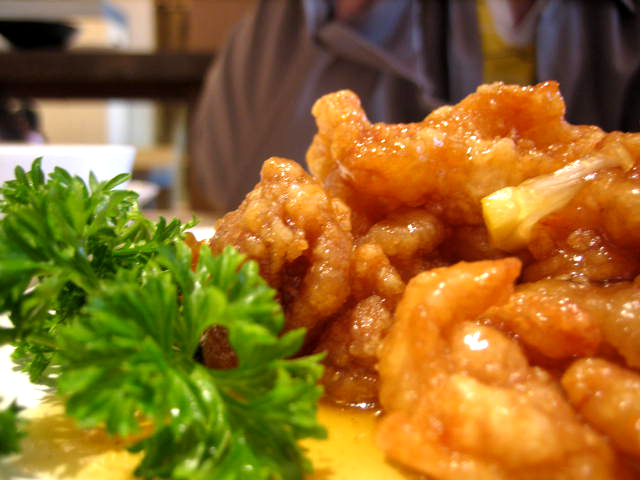
Lemon chicken

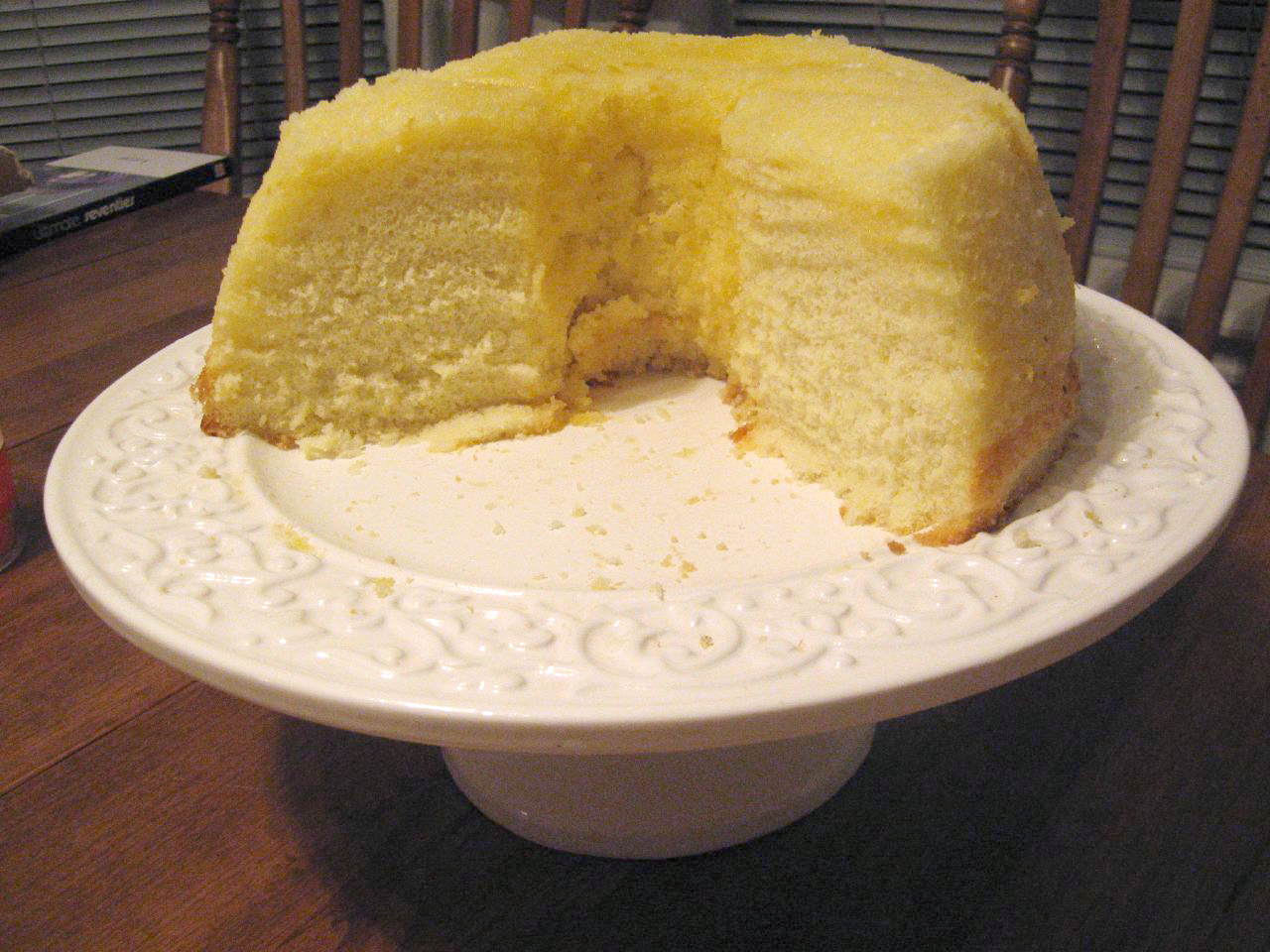
Lemon chiffon cake

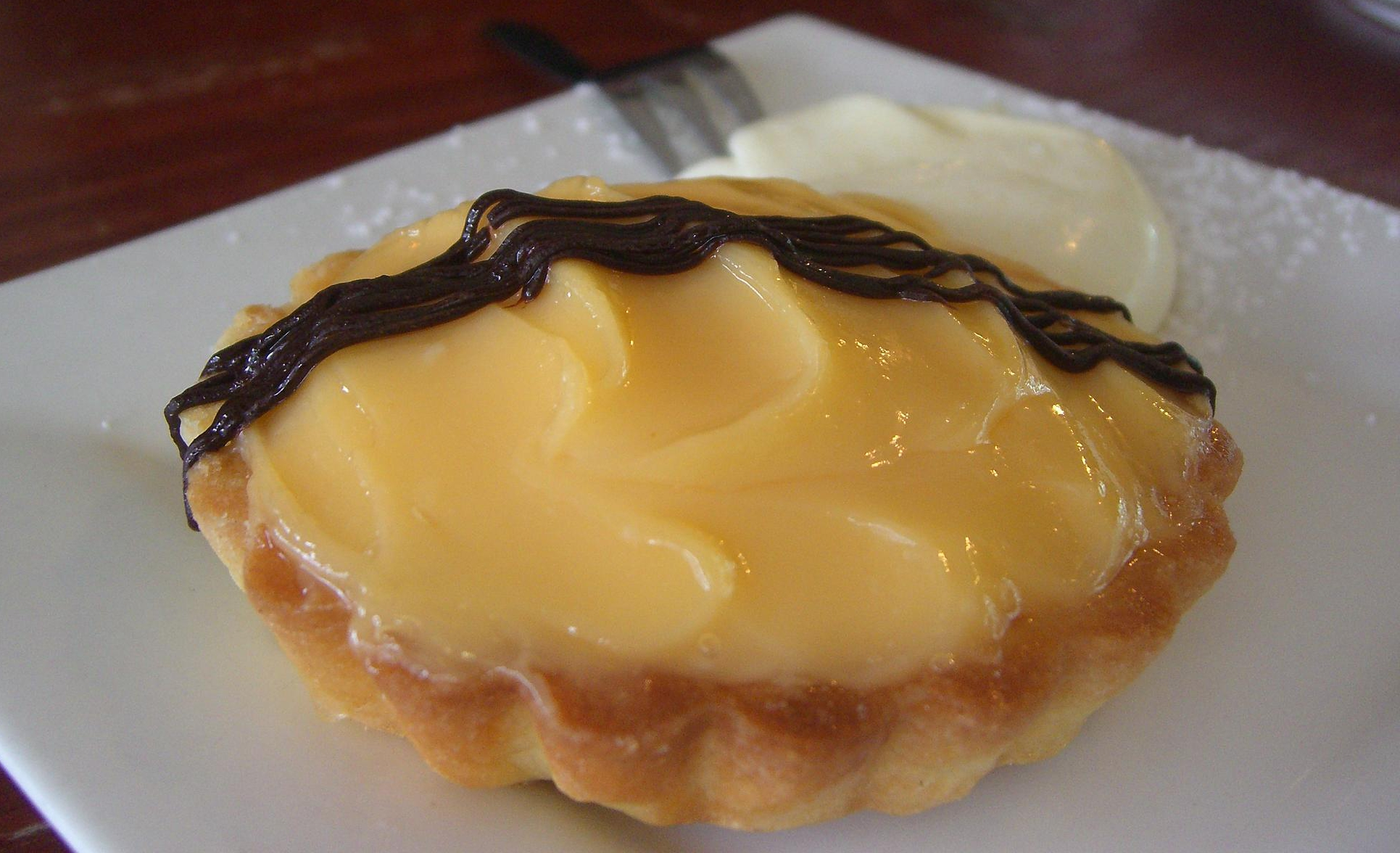
A Lemon tart

== Soups, sauces and condiments ==
- Aioli – Provençal traditional sauce made of garlic, olive oil, lemon juice, and usually egg yolks.
- Avgolemono – family of Mediterranean sauces and soups made with egg and lemon juice mixed with broth, heated until they thicken.
- Clam sauce – topping for pasta, usually linguine, that's typically prepared with minced clams, olive oil, garlic, lemon juice and parsley, or red, usually a thin tomato sauce with minced clams.
- Kabkabou – fish and tomato stew traditionally prepared in Tunisia that includes lemon in its preparation.
- Preserved lemon – condiment consisting of quartered, halved, or whole lemons that are pickled in a brine of water, lemon juice, and salt. Sometimes spices are added.
- Sauce vierge – French sauce made from olive oil, lemon juice, chopped tomato and chopped basil.
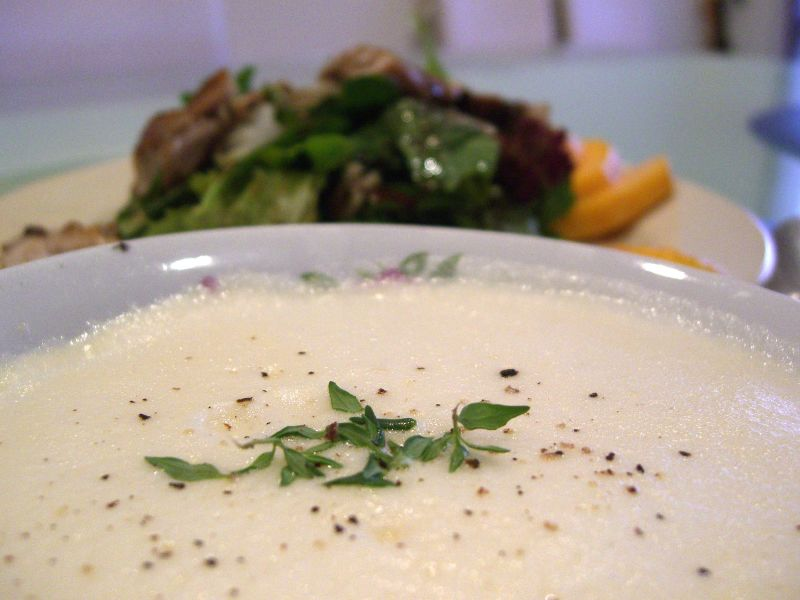
Avgolemono soup (front)

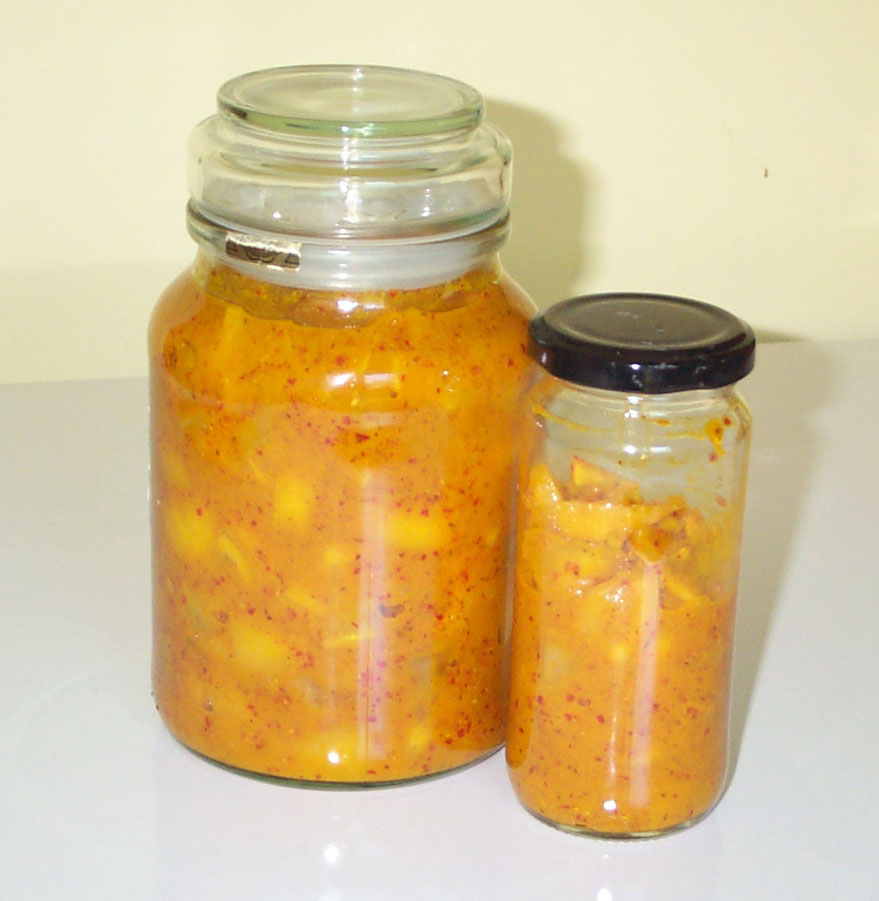
Preserved lemon

== Lemon drinks ==
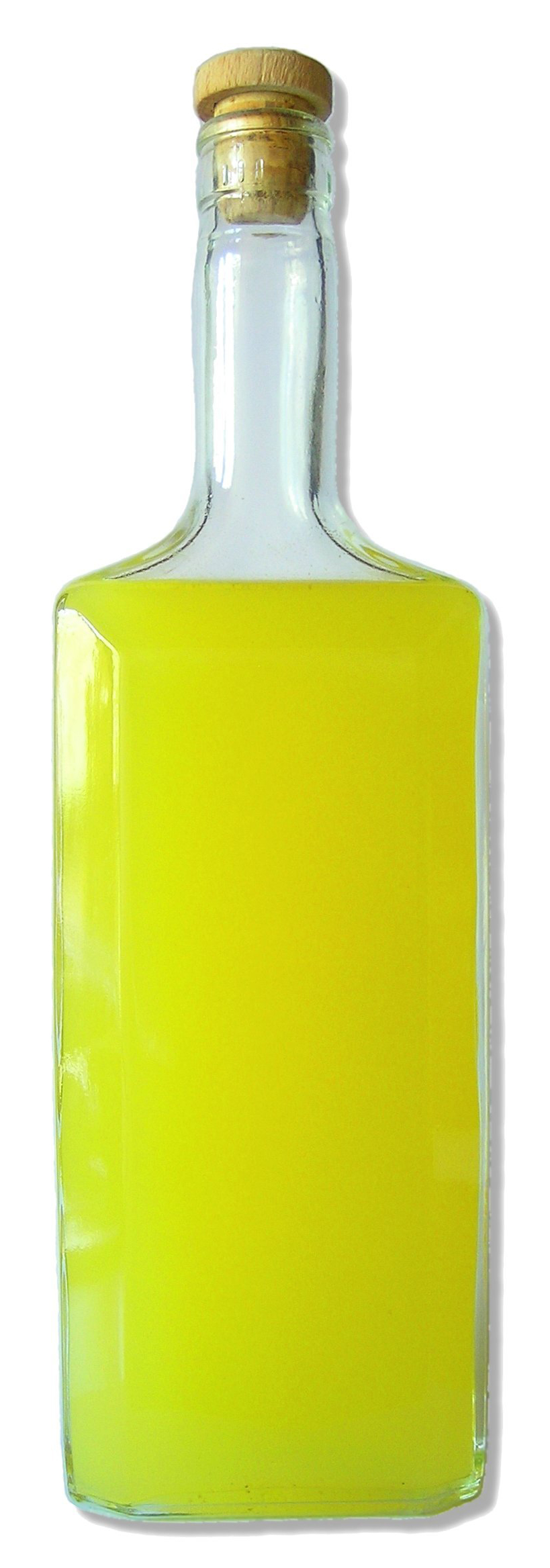
Lemon liqueur

- Arnold Palmer – combination of lemonade and iced tea, named for the professional golfer.
  - John Daly – an alcoholic version of the above, made by adding vodka to the lemonade and iced tea.
- Arne Duncan – combination of lemonade and seltzer water, named for the former Secretary of Education.
- Barley water – in Great Britain it's prepared by boiling washed pearl barley, straining, then pouring the hot water over the rind and/or pulp of a lemon, and adding fruit juice and sugar to taste. The lemon rind may also be boiled with the barley.
- Bitter lemon – carbonated soft drink flavoured with quinine and lemon. The signature bitter taste is produced by a combination of the quinine and the lemon pith used in manufacturing the drink.
- Lemon & Paeroa – sweet soft drink manufactured in New Zealand, traditionally made by combining lemon juice with carbonated mineral water from the town of Paeroa. It is now manufactured by multi-national Coca-Cola.
- Lemonade – lemon-flavored drink sweetened with sugar. In different parts of the world, there are variations on the drink and its name. Pink lemonade and frozen lemonade are also prepared.
- Lemon Drop – cocktail prepared with vodka, lemon juice and other ingredients
- Lemonette – contained a significant amount of real lemon juice when it was first produced.
- Lemon liqueur – liqueur made from lemons, liquor, and sugar. It is light to bright lemon yellow in color; intensely lemony in flavor; clear, cloudy, or opaque; and sweet or sweet and sour. Lemon zest is used, water may be added, and the liqueur is not sour.
- Lemon water – Water combined with lemon juice.
- Limoncello – Italian lemon liqueur mainly produced in Southern Italy, especially in the region around the Gulf of Naples, the Sorrentine Peninsula and the coast of Amalfi and islands of Procida, Ischia and Capri. Traditionally, it is made from the zest of Femminello St. Teresa lemons, also known as Sorrento lemons or Sfusato Lemons.
- Mint lemonade – type of lemonade made with mint that is popular in parts of the Middle East.
- Shikanjvi – type of lemonade from the Indian subcontinent.
- Snowball – cocktail consisting of approximately equal parts advocaat and lemonade.
- Sour – family of mixed drinks containing lemon or lime juice.
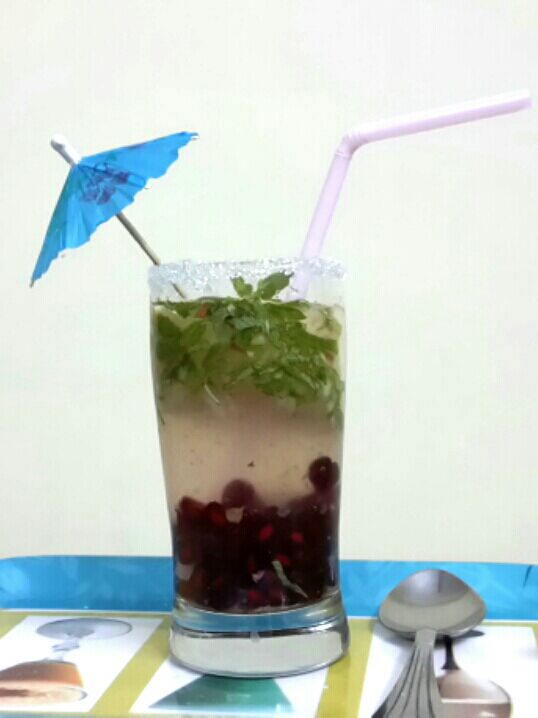
Shikanjvi is a traditional lemonade originating from the Indian subcontinent.

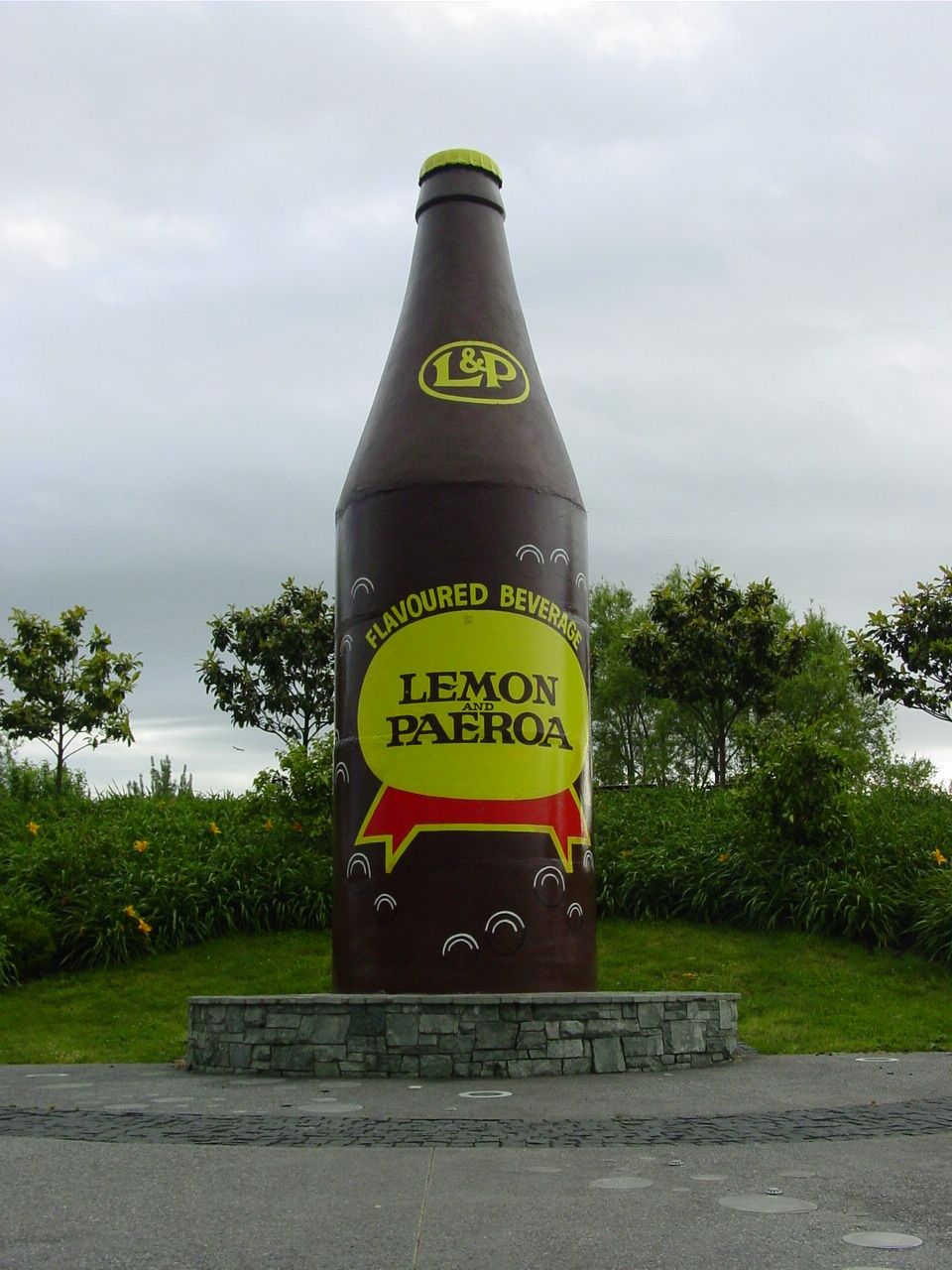
The Giant Lemon & Paeroa bottle in Paeroa, showing the label design as used from the 1970s to the 1990s

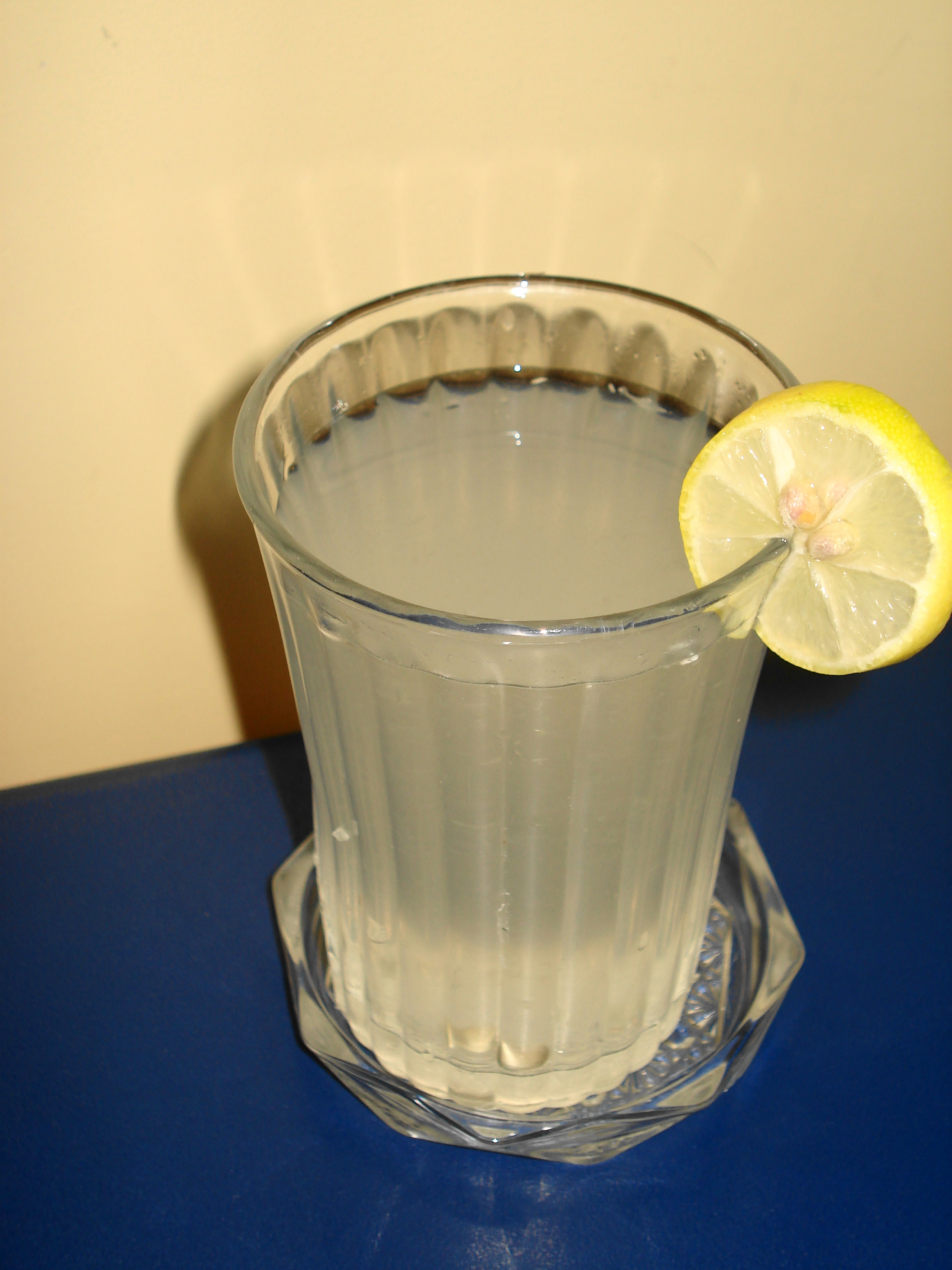
A glass of lemonade

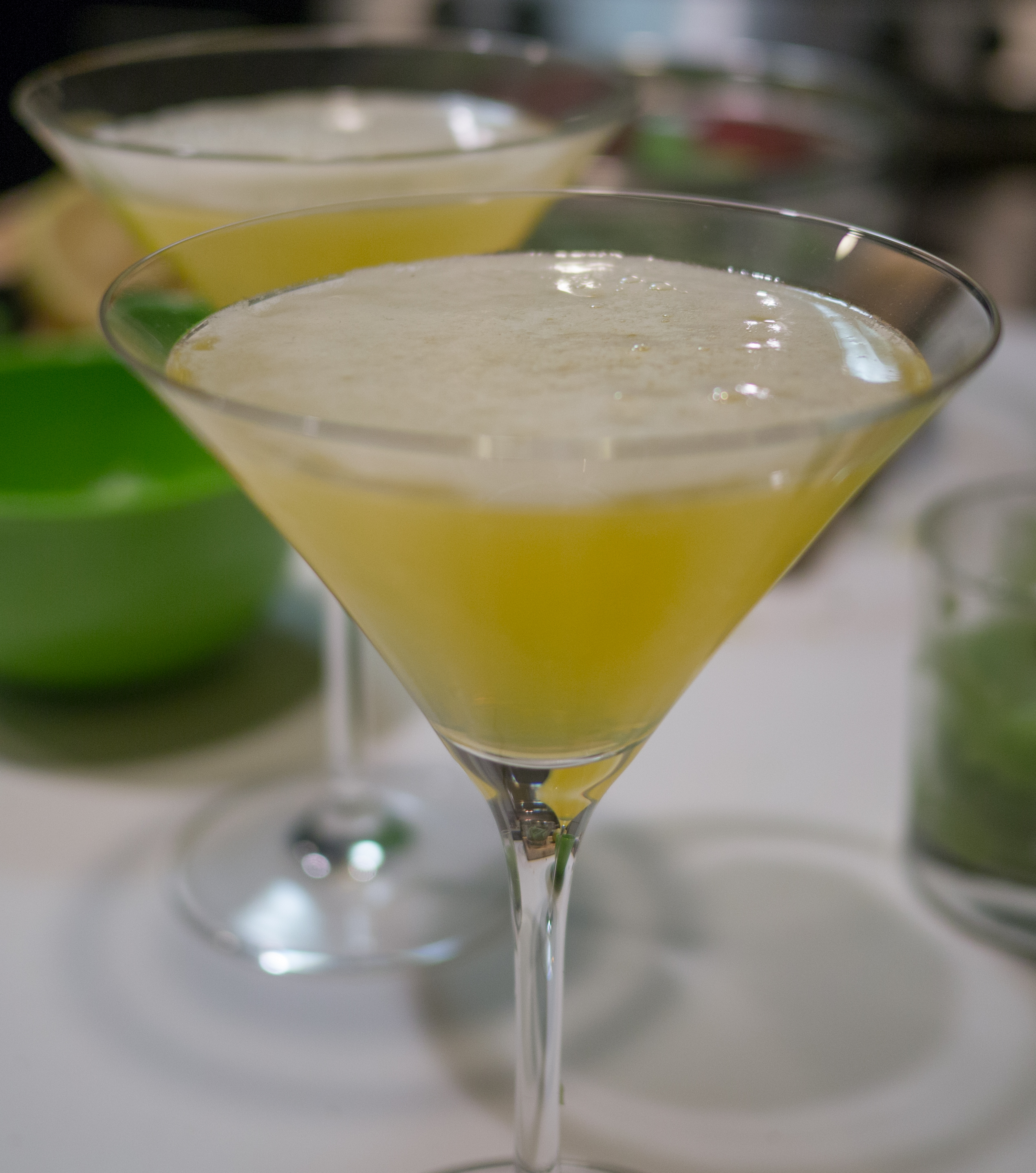
Lemon Drop cocktails

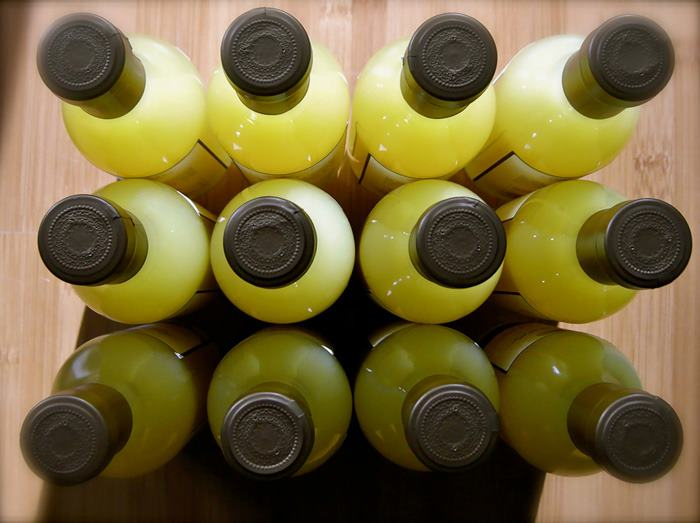
Bottles of limoncello

== Similar foods and drinks ==
- Kitron – a lemon liqueur produced on the Greek island of Naxos. It is made from the fruit and leaves of the citron tree, which is similar to the lemon tree but stronger and slightly different in taste.
- Limeade – similar to lemonade, but is made with lime juice or lime flavor instead of lemon.
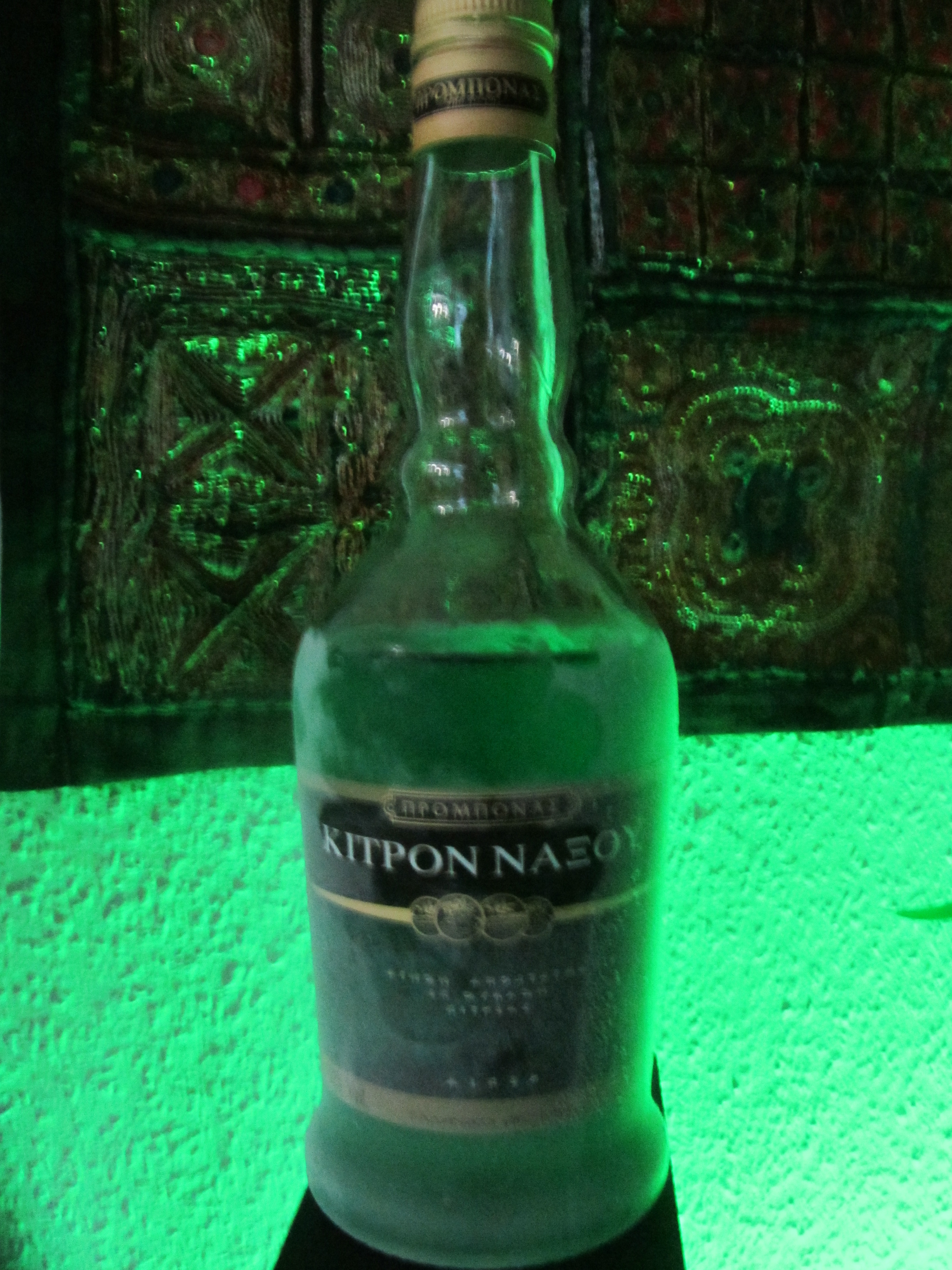
Kitron

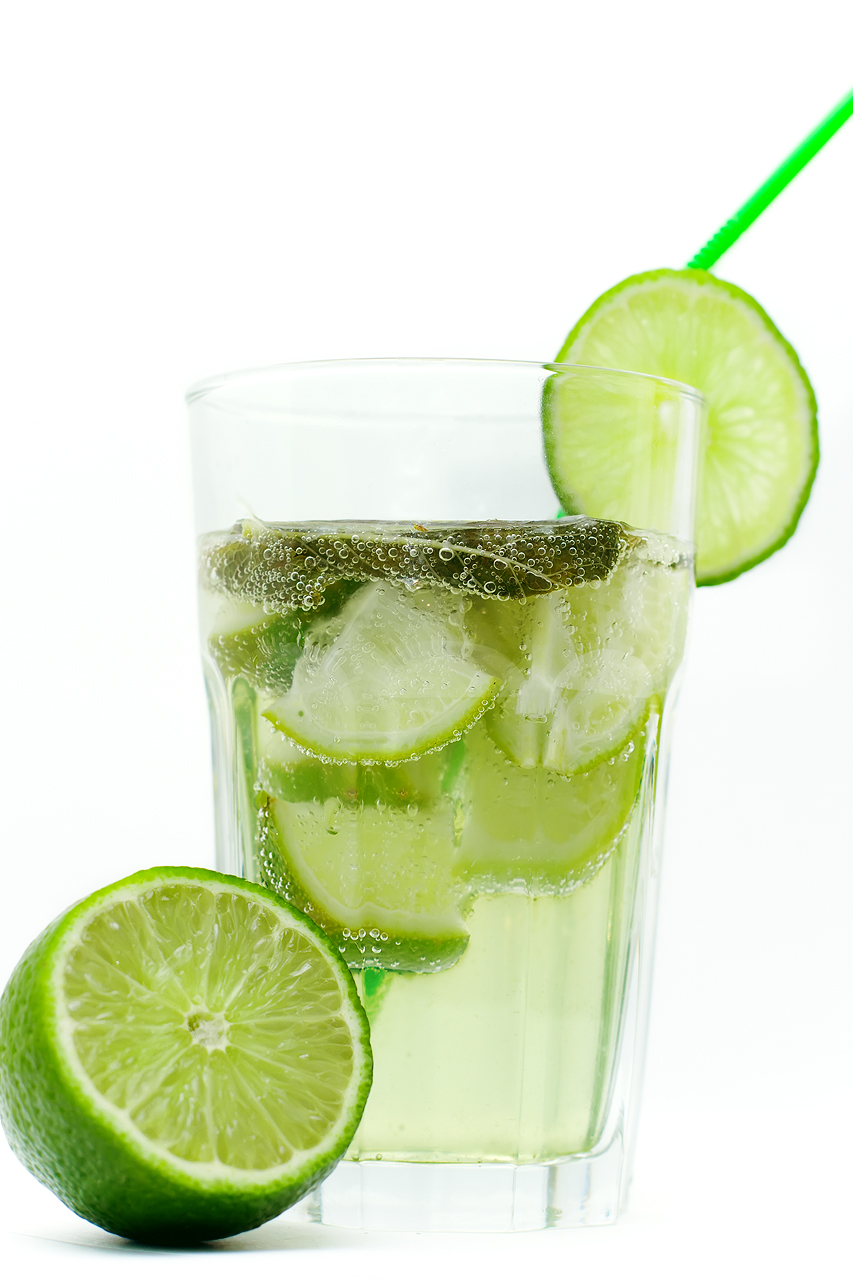
A glass of limeade

== See also ==
- Citrus
- Lemon verbena
- List of citrus fruits
- List of fruit dishes
- List of juices
- List of lemonade topics
