= Boloco =

Restaurant chain in the Boston area

- Boloco logo
- Type: Private
- Industry: Restaurant
- Founded: 1996 (Boston, Massachusetts, US)
- Headquarters: US
- Number of locations: 1 (2025)
- Products: Burritos, wraps, salads, smoothies
- Website: www.boloco.com

Boloco (from Boston Local Company) is an American fast casual restaurant and former restaurant chain in the northeastern United States. Based in Boston, Massachusetts, the restaurant—known for its wraps, smoothies, and burritos—has one location as of 2025. Due to the sale of the building, Boloco was due to close for business at the end of September 2026 after 29 years, but the building owner has extended things for another two weeks.

The chain was founded in 1996 as Under Wraps by Adam Liebman, Gregg Harris, John Pepper and Jason Hutchinson. It shortly thereafter rebranded as The Wrap before expanding in the Boston area through its purchase of Jera's Juice and Wrap Culture. After being acquired, the chain rebranded as Boloco in 2005. Franchised locations were then divested in 2007 and renamed Currito. The local founders took back control of the company in 2014, a time when there were 22 owned locations throughout the northeast and DC area. Since 2014, the company has been downsizing.

Over its history, Boloco has been known as a socially responsible company, notably paying employees higher than the minimum wage and pursuing environmental accreditations such as being certified as a B Corp and a Certified Green Restaurant.

== History ==
=== Origins and The Wrap ===
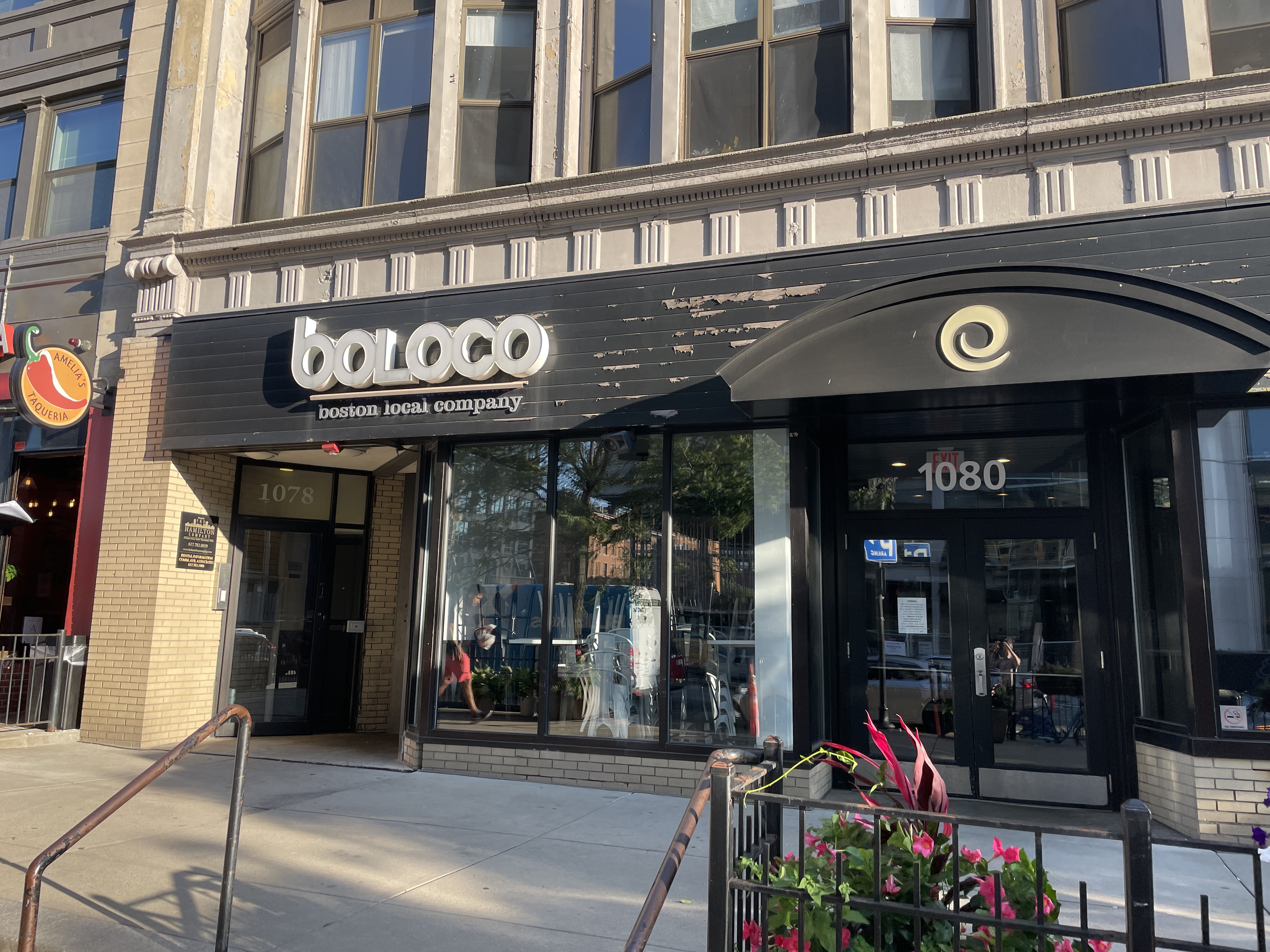
Boloco's former "flagship" Berklee location, Boylston Street at Massachusetts Avenue, is around the corner from the original location. This location closed in 2023.

The company was started in 1996 under the name Under Wraps by cofounders Adam Liebman, Gregg Harris, John Pepper and Jason Hutchinson. Its first restaurant was opened in 1997 in Boston's Back Bay neighborhood on Massachusetts Avenue at Boylston Street. In 1998, the company acquired the competing restaurant Wrap Culture with locations in Harvard Square and Cleveland Circle. All three locations were rebranded under the new name, "The Wrap and Smoothie Bar". In 2000, they merged with a four-unit juice company called "Jera's Juice", forming Stellar Restaurant Group. Over the next few years, the company added restaurants at Northeastern University, on Newbury Street, at Boston Children's Hospital, on Pearl Street, and on Federal Street bringing the total to eight locations. A ninth location in Hanover, New Hampshire, at Dartmouth College came in February 2004 and was the first in the chain to be located outside of the Boston area.

=== Boloco and Currito ===
In late 2004, the founders sold The Wrap brand and assets to Joe Lanni and his sons, who intended to expand the format nationally through franchising. Following the sale, the new owners sought to rebrand the chain to revamp its identity. Signs of the Times's Anya Rao observed that "The restaurant's original name, The Wrap, connotes cold food. You'd expect tuna salad or deli turkey rolled in a flour tortilla. But, instead, the restaurant features more elaborate, eclectic, hot burritos". The rebranding was handled by design firm FRCH Design Worldwide, which ultimately helped select the name Boloco, from "Boston local company", to honor the chain's roots. Design firm member Santiago Crespo stated that the new name would not "[limit] it to wraps or burritos" and that its accompanying tagline "'Inspired Burritos,' identifies the variety of creative food served there." Also problematic of the original name was that The Wrap was deemed to be too generic to be legally protected, an issue that Pepper noted would affect their expansion plans. The consulting firm had presented six name options, from which Boloco placed highest on surveys.

New CEO Mike Harder formerly of Chipotle Mexican Grill was hired to run the company and oversee the plan to rebrand as Boloco in 2005. At the time, the chain consisted of ten restaurants. Between 2005 and 2007, the company opened six Boloco stores in the Boston area as well as Concord, New Hampshire, and Burlington, Vermont. This included the Davis Square location in Somerville, which opened in December 2006. Elsewhere, 14 franchised Boloco locations were in operation by May 2016 through five franchisees, with ten additional locations scheduled to open that year, and 15 to 25 more in 2007. Included in that were 25 locations on college campuses by means of a deal with food service provider Sodexo.

In 2007, the Boston-based founders repurchased all of the sold assets and the franchised locations were rebranded as Currito. A year later, a controlling stake in the company was sold to Winona Capital Management. In 2013, Pepper, who had remained an investor at Boloco following the sale, gave the company an ultimatum to approve a $15 million investment deal or he would leave the company; the deal was ultimately not approved and he stepped down. The peak number of locations was 22, in 2014, but the company was losing about $3 million per year. The locations in Washington, D.C., and Bethesda, Maryland, closed in December 2014.

=== Local ownership and closures ===
Founder John Pepper and other Boloco cofounders returned to lead the company in 2015 after repurchasing the chain from Winona. Speaking to The Boston Globe, Pepper stated that it "was the right thing to do" and that "the company was slow to rein in costs and focus on profitability. Sales fell and the company lost money in 2014." He added that "If anyone can help Boloco survive and thrive, I'm the person to do it."

With Pepper back leading the chain as interim CEO, Boloco closed several underperforming locations in an attempt to return to profitability. The Newbury Street location closed in June 2015, followed by two Downtown Boston locations on School Street and Pearl Street, which were announced to have closed in October 2015, and May 2016 saw the closure of the Cleveland Circle location. Autumn of 2016 then saw major changes, with five locations sold to B. Good, another local restaurant chain, which was founded by a former Boloco employee. These locations included Northeastern University, Natick, Wellesley, Burlington, Vermont, and Concord, New Hampshire. Additional closings came in 2017 when the Harvard Square and Warwick, Rhode Island, locations closed in July to become the first U.S. locations of Australia-based Zambrero. Alongside the closure, Pepper tweeted "Here's part of the general reason. Warwick lost money every day for 4 yrs. Time to let go." Nine locations remained following the 2017 closures—eight in Massachusetts and one in New Hampshire—and the company had reportedly returned to profitability by 2018.

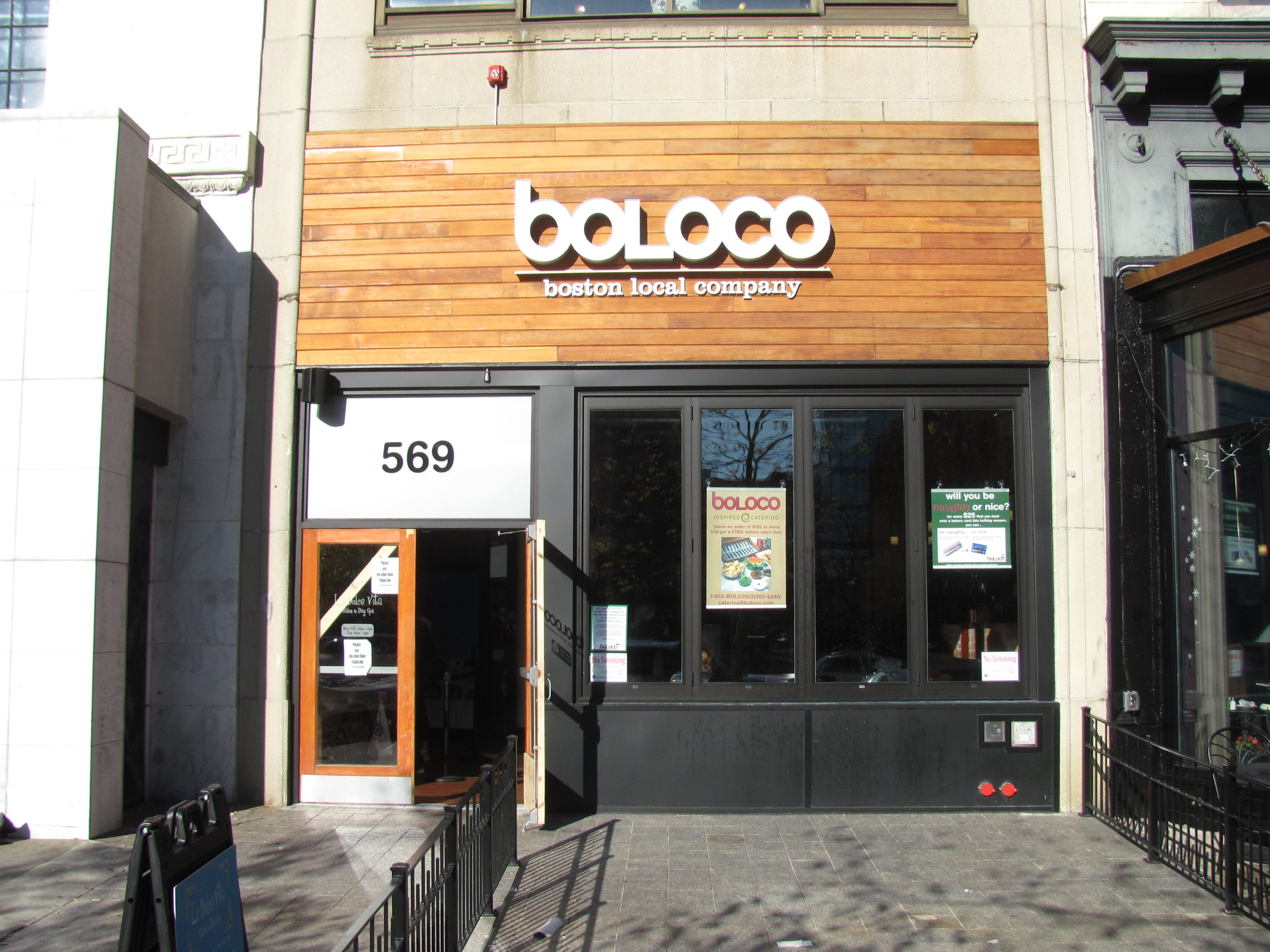
The former Boloco in Boston's Copley Square (2011)

Confusion regarding the closing of the Boylston Street restaurant in Copley Square began in late 2018 after Chick-fil-A announced that it was opening its first Boston location in the space Boloco occupied. Pepper tweeted in response that "there is not yet any agreement for Boloco to leave. We have a lease thru 2020 and a decade of options after. We are working with landlord to find a solution based on what we've read." The location eventually did close, with Boloco's website noting an alleged large rent increase as the reason.

Boloco restaurants were affected by the COVID-19 pandemic, with four locations closing by late March 2020. The Berklee, Children's Hospital, and Lynnfield restaurants remained open for a time offering a "Feeding the Front Line" menu with items for $5 or less. By October 2020, the chain was working through renegotiating leases for existing stores and shopping for potential buyers; only the Children's Hospital and Lynnfield locations remained open. Pepper said in an October 9 letter to shareholders that he was pursuing a sale of the company to other small businesses at a "discounted price that would offer no value to shareholders," however, the sale did not materialize. He also hoped to reopen the Boston Common and Berklee locations within a few weeks. Both the Lynnfield and Atlantic Wharf restaurants were unable to stay open following the lease negotiations and permanently closed.

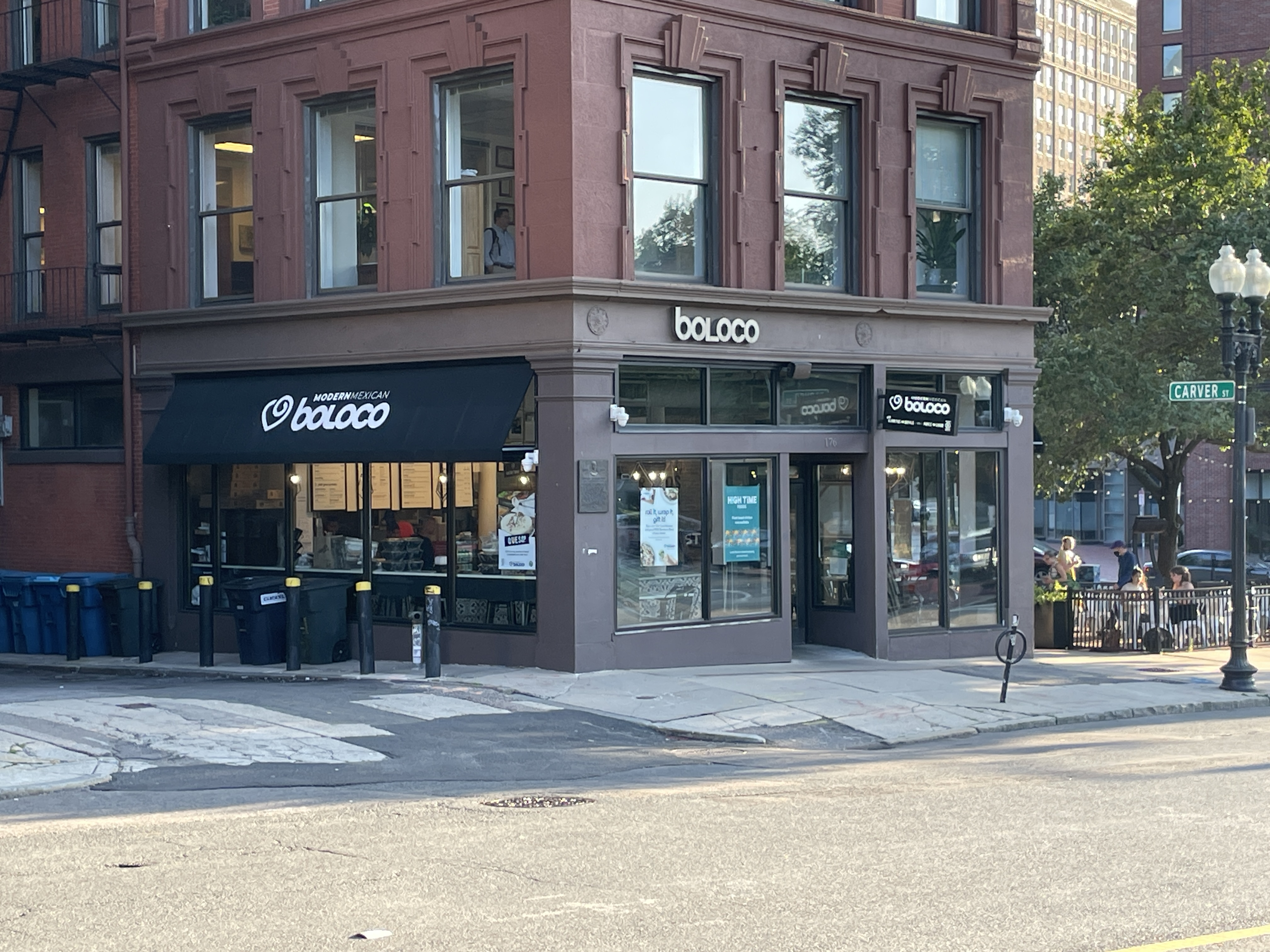
Boloco's Boston Common location, which closed in late 2023.

On August 25, 2023, Boloco announced the closure of its "flagship" Berklee (Massachusetts Avenue at Boylston Street) location effective that day. Two other locations in Downtown Boston—50 Congress Street and 176 Boylston Street (Boston Common)— were announced to be closing before the end of 2023; all three would close following the expiration of their leases. The closures would leave the chain with two outposts: Boston Children's Hospital and Hanover, New Hampshire. Pepper stated that he had "exhausted all efforts" to keep the chain open despite sales at all remaining locations except Berklee returning to 2019 levels.

In late 2023, it was announced that the Congress Street location would remain open after negotiations with the landlord succeeded. In February 2024, with three locations remaining in operation, Pepper announced that the Hanover store had been sold to new owners who intended to keep it as a Boloco, with Pepper staying on as a minority shareholder in the location for the time being. During 2025, the Boston Children's Hospital location closed and in September 2025, the Hanover location was renamed Bōcasōca to reflect the change in menu and ownership, leaving Boloco as a single location in Boston. In a 2025 interview regarding the sole remaining restaurant, which Pepper owns, he stated he had been "in this process of winding down [the restaurant chain] for a decade". In late July 2026, Pepper announced the closure of the Congress Street Boloco to be September 25, marking 29 years of and six months of the business. He added that since the building was sold and is to be converted from office to residential, the closure of the restaurant had "more to do with the redevelopment process than any financial struggles", and that it he was touring vacancies downtown as there was "still a chance that Boloco finds a new location."

== Corporate identity ==
In 2007, the Humane Society of the United States announced that Boloco had gone cage free for its estimated "318,000 worth of liquid eggs" it used each year. Then-CEO Harder stated that it was "the right thing to do and results in better food for our customers". A year later, the chain became the first fast-casual chain in New England to gain Certified Green status from the Green Restaurant Association (GRA); by 2011, it received a 2-star designation from the group. In a press release announcing the new designation, the GRA noted that Boloco had "reduce[d] its environmental footprint and increase[d] sustainable practices". Examples of the techniques used included a recycling program, organic t-shirts, and providing environmental education to employees. Food service supplier HT Berry noted that it had worked with Boloco to accomplish its sustainability goals, such as offering compostable items instead of plastic utensils and bowls, and eliminating Styrofoam cups. Boloco became a certified B Corp in 2016, a designation that "recognizes businesses that balance social responsibility with the pursuit of profits". The chain later experimented with plant-based minced chicken in 2022 at the Congress Street location.

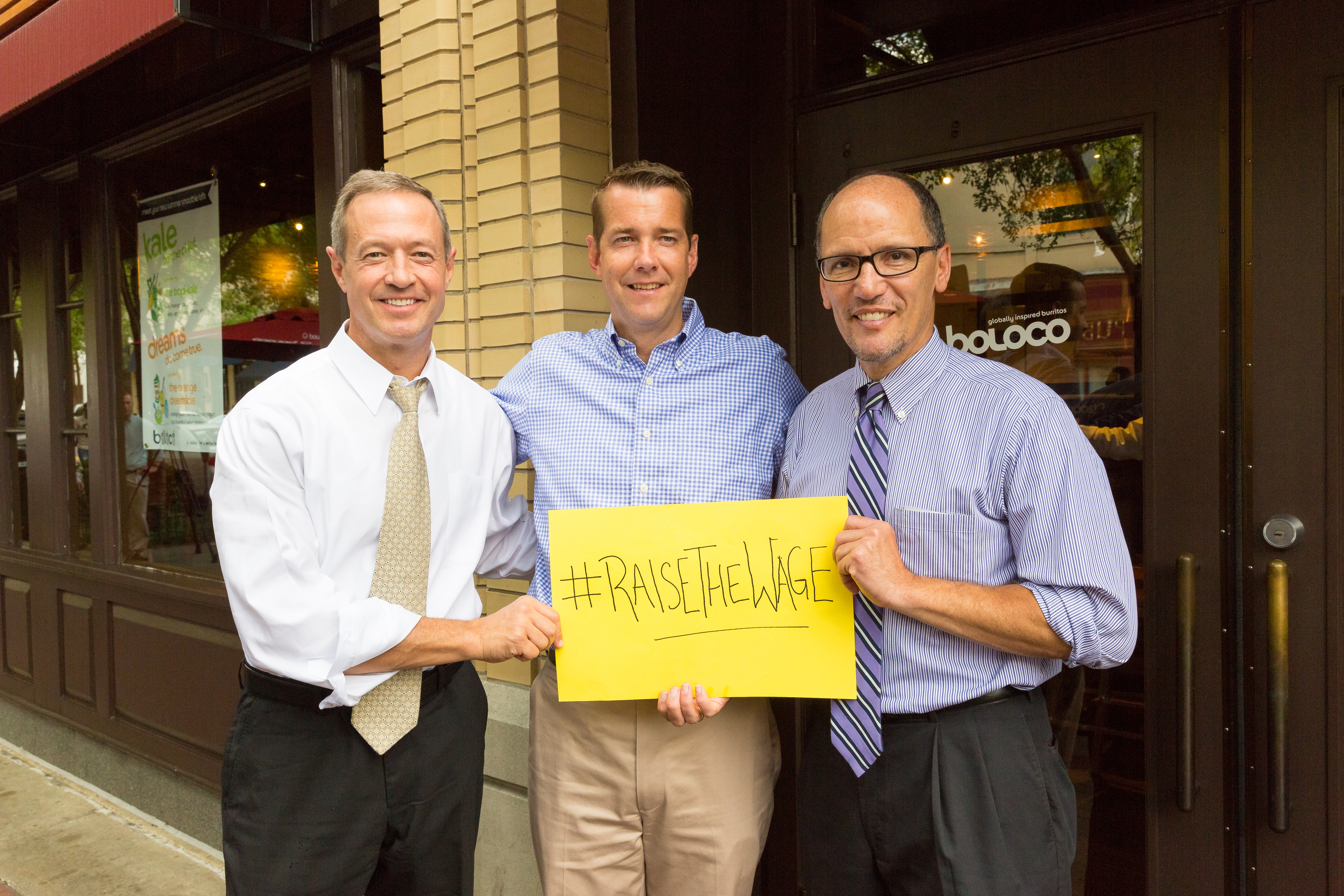
Maryland Governor Martin O'Malley, Boloco CEO Patrick Renna, and U.S. Secretary of Labor Thomas E. Perez holding a #RAISETHEWAGE sign at a Maryland Boloco (2014).

The chain was recognized in 2014 for its commitment to paying higher-than-minimum wages. At a press event at the Congress Street restaurant in February 2014, U.S. Senators Elizabeth Warren and Richard Durbin spoke to bring awareness to then-U.S. President Barack Obama's goal to increase the federal minimum wage. They emphasized that both businesses and workers were in support of the initiative. Later that year in August at an event at the Bethesda, Maryland, restaurant, Maryland governor Martin O'Malley was joined by U.S. Labor Secretary Thomas E. Perez to call for an increase in the federal minimum wage and to promote the governor's proposed increase to that state's minimum wage. In a 2014 article, The New York Times reported that Boloco was "one of the handful of restaurant chains that deliberately pay well above the federal minimum wage," and in 2015, The Boston Globe's Taryn Luna wrote that Boloco was a "rare champion for low-wage workers in a fast-food industry notorious for paying the bare minimum and relying on part-time employees". In 2002 when the minimum wage was $5.15, the chain paid its workers no less than $8 per hour. By 2018, the average hourly wage for employees was $14.50 while comparable industries paid workers only $9.54 per hour according to the U.S. Bureau of Labor Statistics. CEO John Pepper noted that "Boloco had acted as a sort of 'Petri dish' for his own progressive model", adding "How high can you push people's wages and still have a viable, profitable business?"
