= Seymour G. Sternberg =

Seymour Sternberg
- Born: June 24, 1943 (age 82); New York City, New York
- Other name: Sy Sternberg
- Occupations: Chairman and former chief executive officer of New York Life
- Website: NYL Executive Management Committee

Seymour "Sy" Sternberg (born June 24, 1943) is the former chairman and CEO of New York Life Insurance Company. He retired as CEO on June 30, 2008. He also sits on the board of directors for the United States Chamber of Commerce, Northeastern University, CIT Group, the New York City Leadership Academy, and Express Scripts Holdings. Sternberg previously served as a member of the foundation board of Macaulay Honors College; he supported the college during its early years with a donation of $2 million from New York Life.

Sternberg is of Lithuanian and Romanian descent, and is Jewish.
