= Fruit curd =

Dessert spread and topping

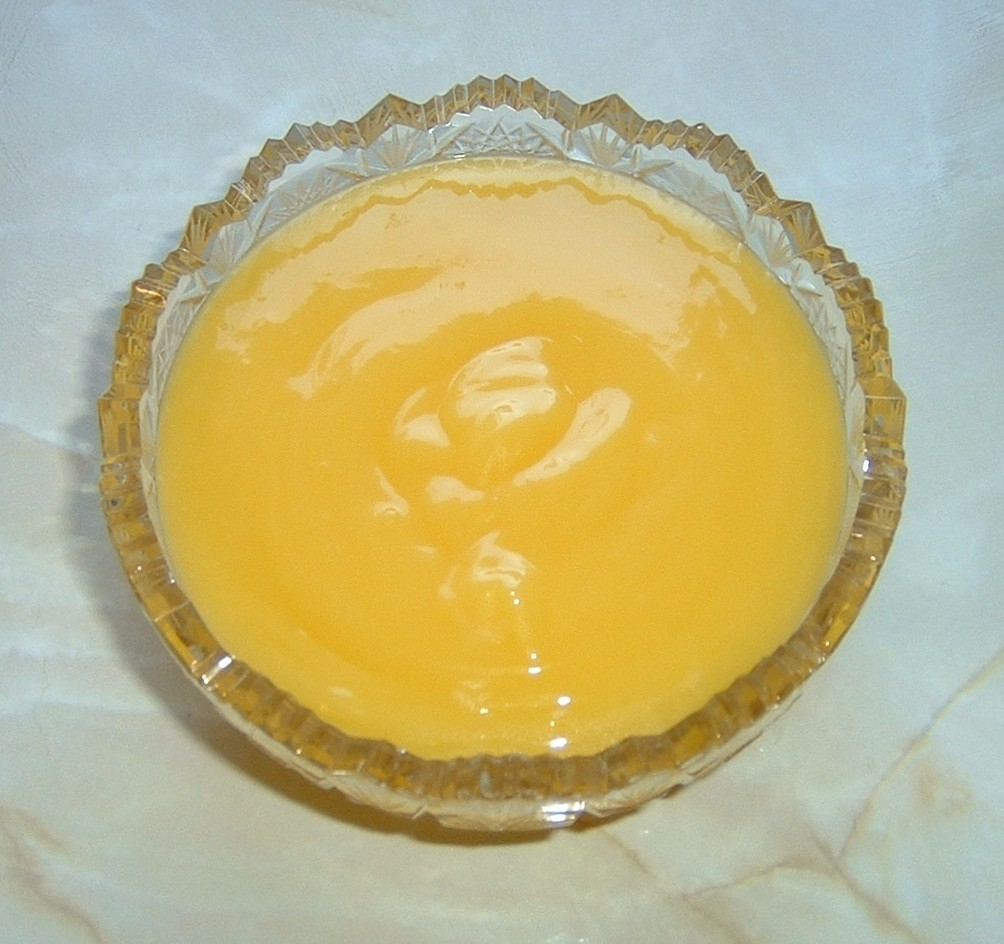
- Homemade lemon curd
- Type: Spread
- Course: Dessert
- Place of origin: England
- Main ingredients: Egg yolks, sugar, fruit juice and zest

Fruit curd is a dessert sauce, prepared similarly to custard but with fruit juice instead of milk or cream. It is usually, though not always, made with citrus fruit. Curds are often used as fillings and spreads in cakes, pastries, tarts, and other desserts.

== Description ==
Fruit curd is a dessert spread and topping usually made with citrus fruit, such as lemon, lime, orange, grapefruit or tangerine. Other flavour variations include passion fruit (or lilikoi), mango, and berries such as raspberries, cranberries or blackberries.

Similarly to custard, curd is made by gently heating egg yolks and sugar gently until thick. Curds, however, also incorporate fruit juice and zest. Once thickened, the mixture is allowed to cool, forming a soft, smooth spread. The egg yolks are usually tempered in the cooking process to prevent coagulation. Some recipes include egg whites or butter.

Curds containing butter have a smoother and creamier texture than pie fillings or custards, which contain little or no butter and use cornstarch or flour for thickening. Additionally, unlike custards, curds are not usually eaten on their own.

== Use ==
In late 19th- and early 20th-century England, homemade lemon curd was traditionally served with bread or scones at afternoon tea as an alternative to jam, and as a filling for cakes, small pastries and tarts. Contemporary commercially made curds remain a popular spread for bread, scones, toast, waffles, crumpets, pancakes, cheesecake or muffins.

Fruit curds can be used as a flavouring for desserts or yoghurt. Lemon-meringue pie—made with lemon curd and topped with meringue—has been a popular dessert in Britain, Canada, Australia and the US since the 19th century. Whipped cream may be folded in for such uses as filling cream puffs.

Homemade lemon curd was usually made in relatively small amounts as it did not keep as well as jam. In more modern times, larger quantities became possible because of the use of refrigeration. Commercially manufactured curds often contain preservatives and thickening agents.

== Gallery ==
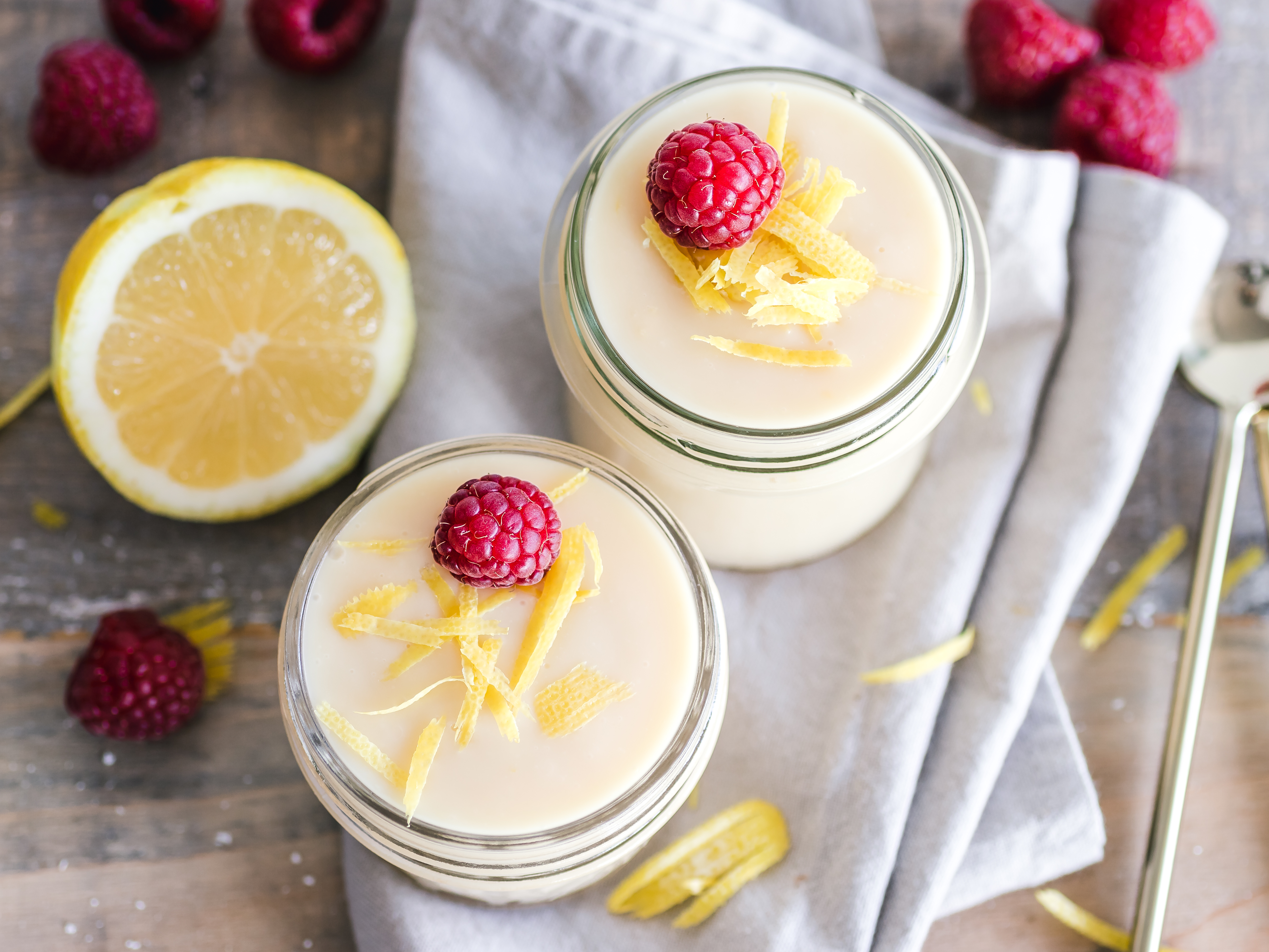
Vegan lemon curd

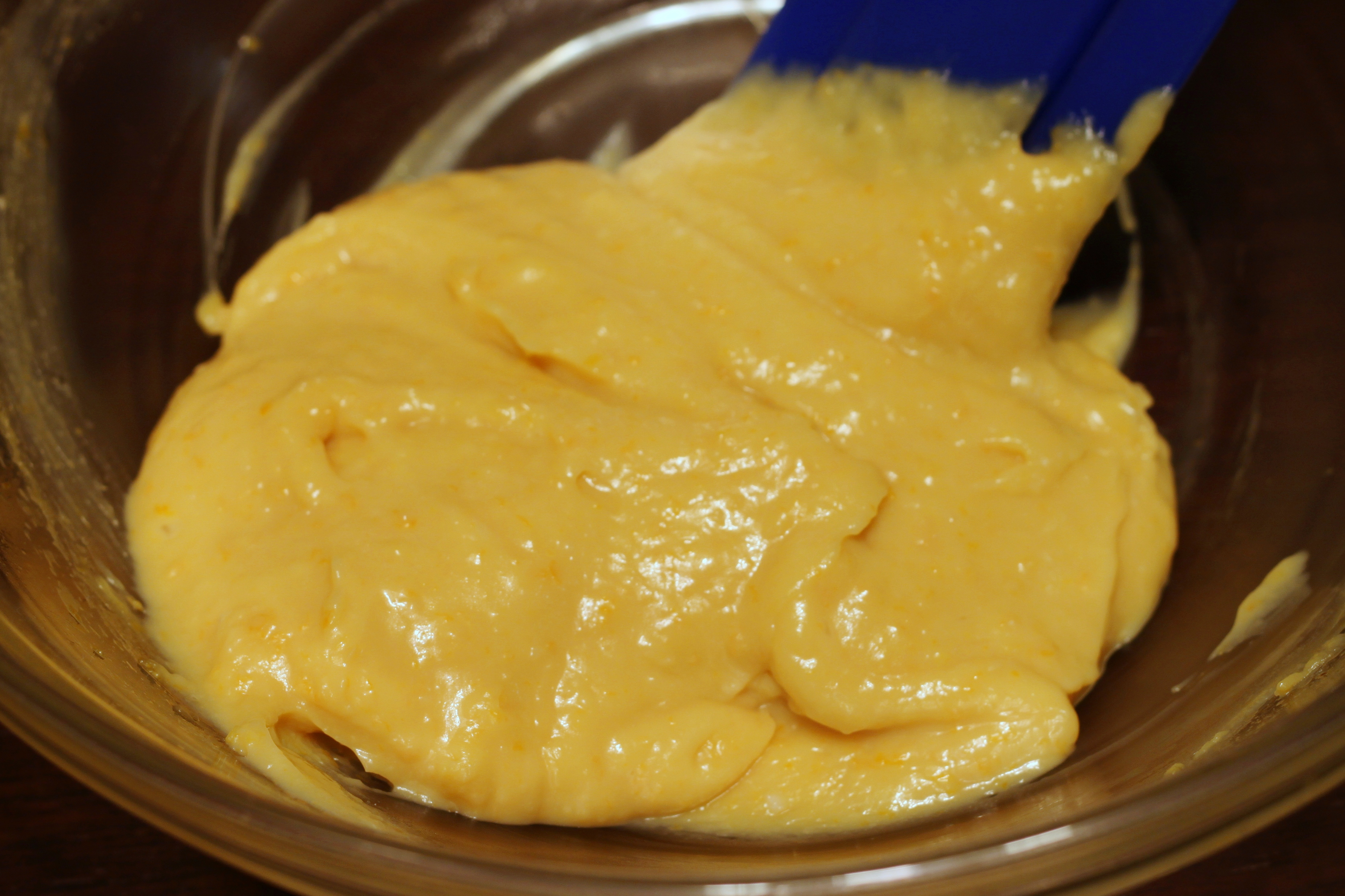
Orange curd

== See also ==
- List of dessert sauces
- List of lemon dishes and drinks
- List of spreads
