= Green Restaurant Certification =

Environmental certification

Coordinates: 42.35184°N 71.057489°W

The Green Restaurant Association (GRA) is a United States non-profit organization that provides certification for restaurants to become more environmentally responsible. Since 1990, the GRA has been building an extensive database of environmental goals for the restaurant industry.

Green Restaurant Certification allows diners to be able to rely on their favorite restaurant's environmental claims and communicates credibility.

The GRA rates existing restaurants and food service operations with points in seven environmental categories. These categories are water efficiency, waste reduction and recycling, sustainable furnishings and building materials, sustainable food, energy, disposables, chemical and pollution reduction.

Certified Green Restaurants need to accumulate points to be certified, have a full-scale recycling program, be free of polystyrene foam (a.k.a. Styrofoam), and fulfill yearly education requirements.
