= Lemon meringue pie =

Pie topped with meringue

- Type: Pie
- Course: Dessert
- Main ingredients: Shortcrust pastry or shortbread; Lemon curd; Meringue
- Food energy (per 127 g serving): 285 kcal (1,190 kJ)
Nutritional value
(per 127 g serving)
- Protein: 4.8 g
- Fat: 16.4 g
- Carbohydrate: 49.7 g

Lemon meringue pie is a dessert pie consisting of a shortened pastry base filled with lemon curd and topped with meringue.

== History ==
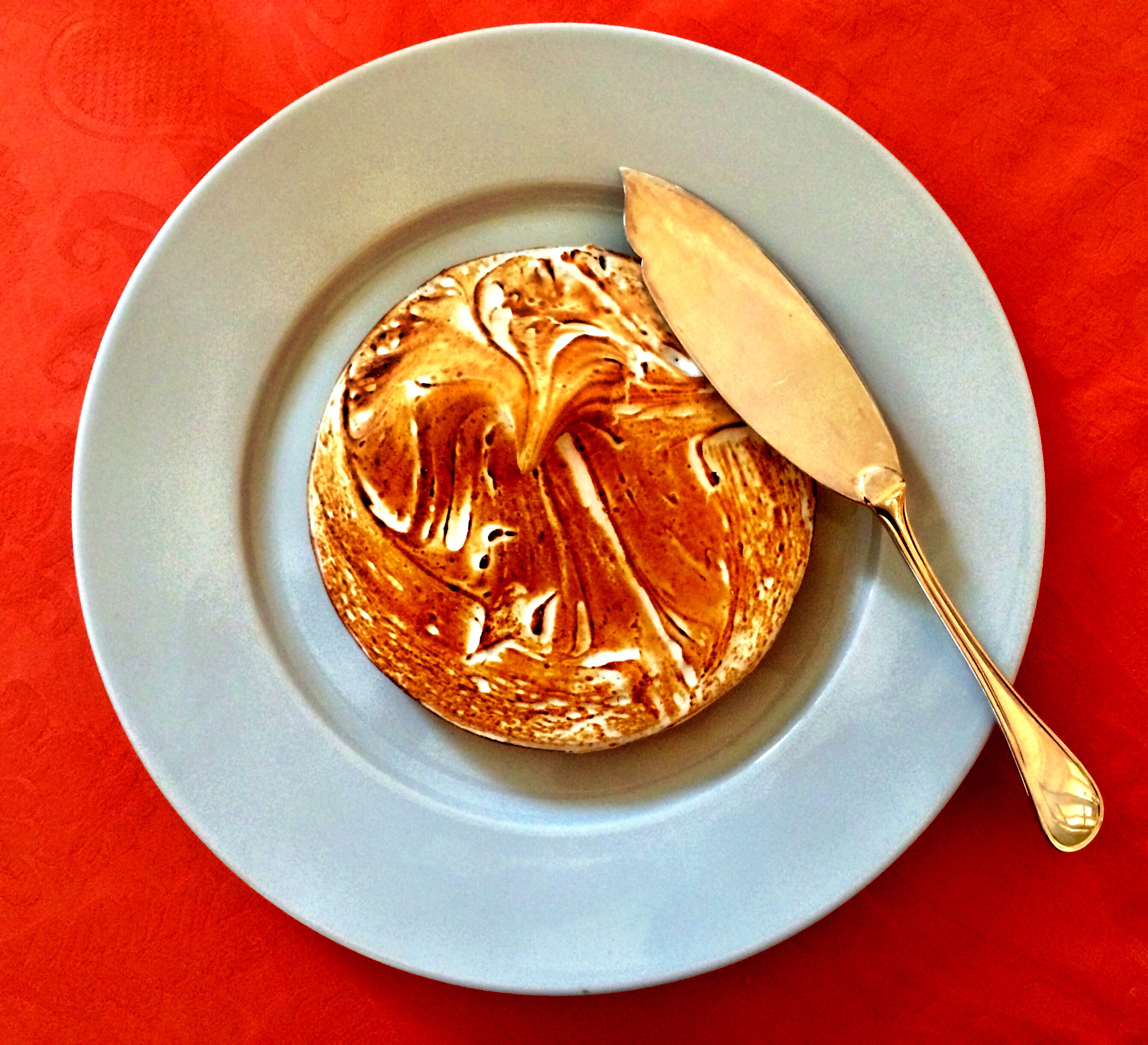
Lemon meringue pie in Paris

Documentation of fruit desserts covered with baked meringue goes back to the 18th century in France. In 1739, Menon offers a recipe for pommes meringuées, a dessert of thick apple sauce or apple butter covered with meringue. A recipe for lemon custard covered with baked meringue, crême meringuée, appeared in an English cookbook published in 1769.This may have been a translation from an earlier Menon cookbook. Similar recipes were published in 19th century America: apple pie covered with meringue, called 'apple a la turque' (1832) and 'apples meringuées' (1846). A generic 'meringue pie' based on any pie was documented in 1860. The name 'Lemon Meringue Pie' appears in 1869, but lemon custard pies with meringue topping were often simply called 'lemon cream pie'. In literature one of the first references to this dessert can be found in the book 'Memoir and Letters of Jenny C. White Del Bal' by Rhoda E. White, published in 1868.

A chocolate meringue variant exists.

== Preparation ==
A stiff lemon-flavored custard is prepared with egg yolks, lemon zest and juice, sugar, and sometimes starch and baked in a pie crust. Uncooked meringue, usually shaped into peaks, is spread over the top, sometimes with a sprinkle of sugar, and briefly baked.

== See also ==
- Atlantic Beach pie
- Key lime pie
- List of lemon dishes and beverages
- National Lemon Meringue Pie Day – 15 August
