= List of lemonade topics =

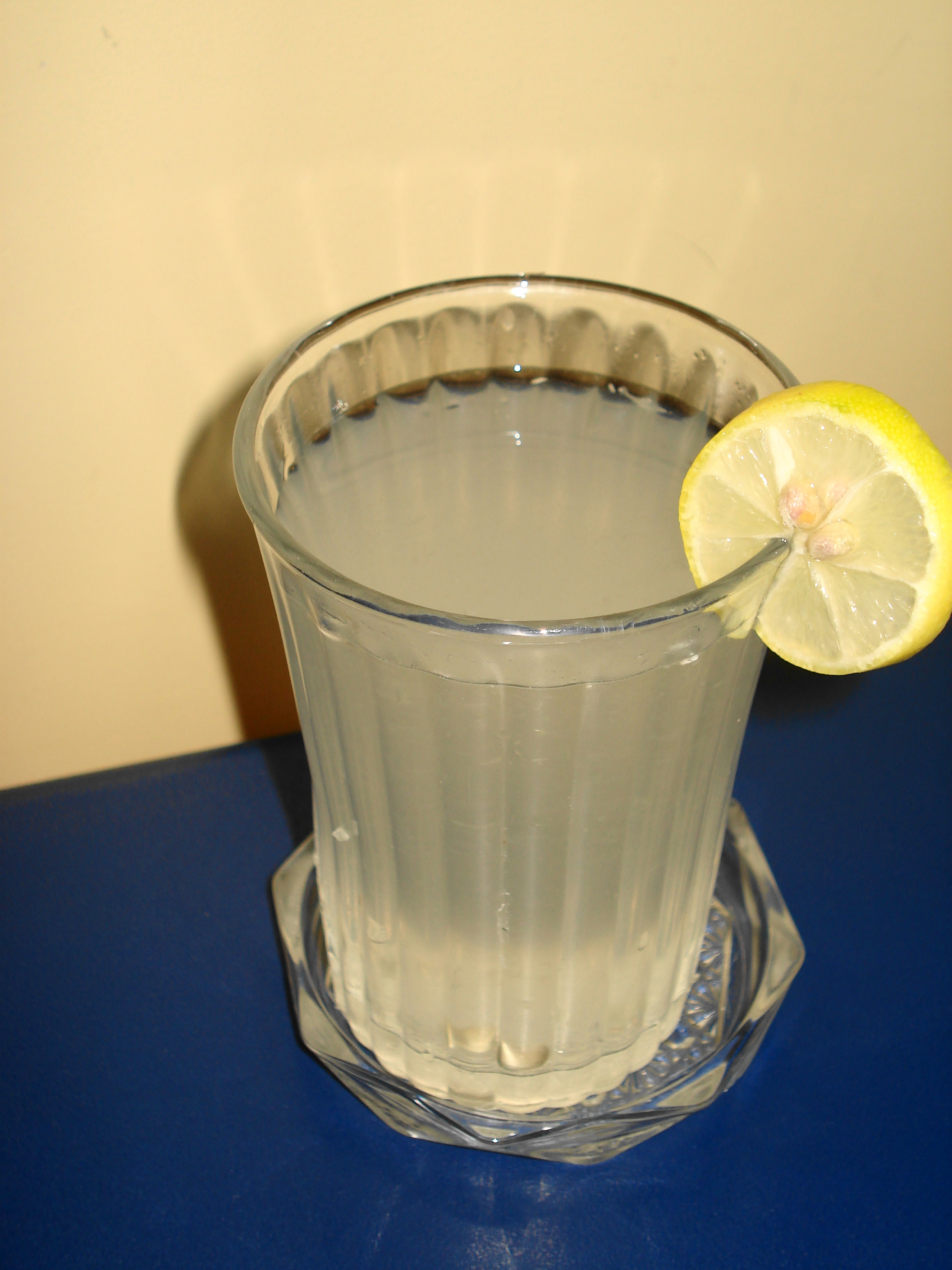
A glass of lemonade

This is a list of lemonade topics.

== Lemonade brands ==
- Citrus Hill
- Cottee's
- Del's
- Fruitopia
- Jones Soda
- Leed (soft drink)
- Lemonsoda
- Leninade
- Lorina
- Maine Soft Drinks Ltd
- Mike's Hard Lemonade Co.
- Minute Maid
- R. White's Lemonade
- Schweppes
- Woodroofe

== Regional varieties ==
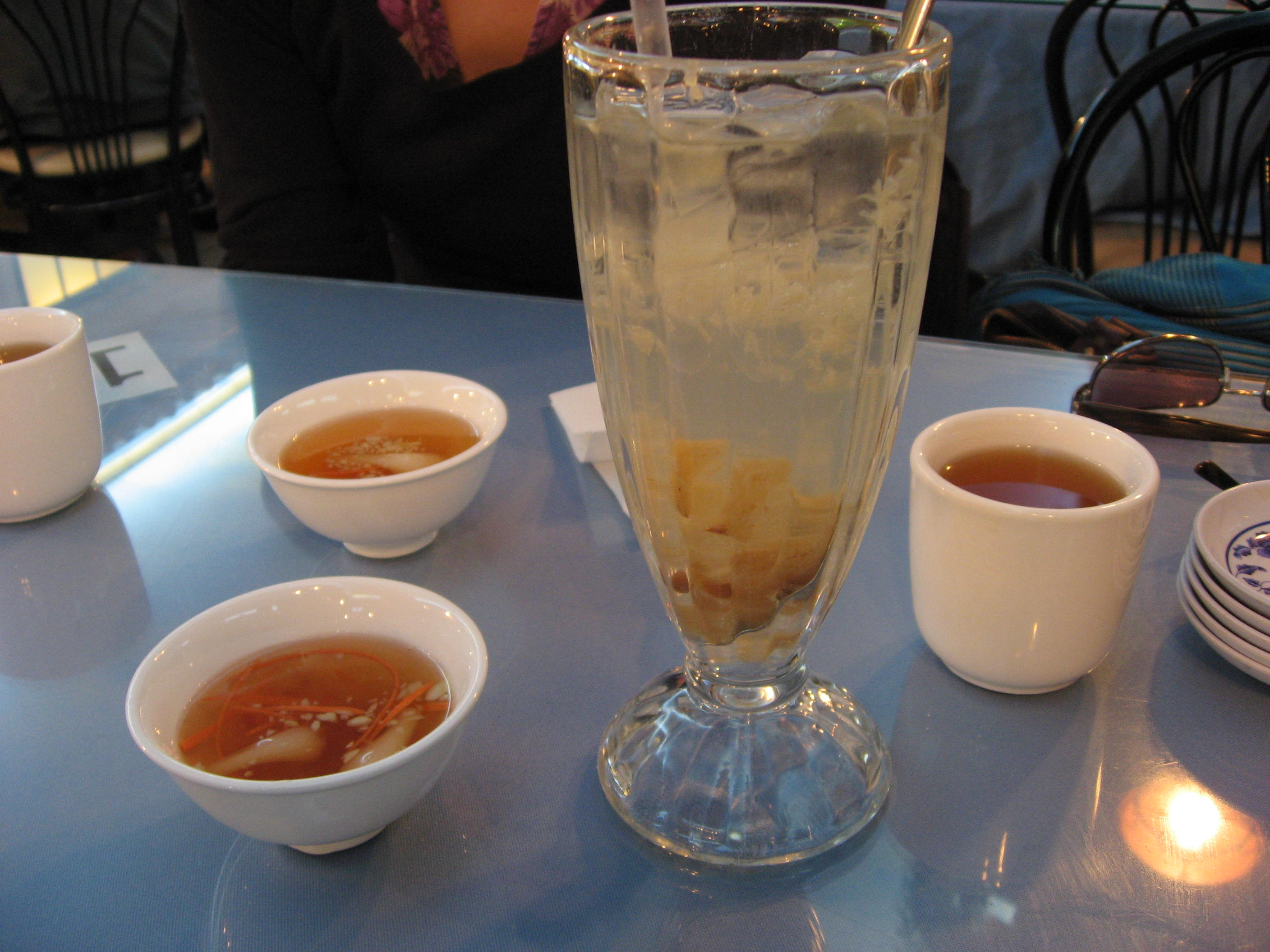
A glass of chanh muối made with lemons, in a restaurant in New York City's Chinatown

- Chanh muối
- Leonese lemonade
- Limonada cimarrona
- Limonana
- Papelón con limón
- Shikanjvi

== Cocktails and mixed drinks ==
- Arnold Palmer (drink)
- John Daly (drink)
- Shandy
- Snowball (cocktail)
- Tom Collins

== Other topics ==
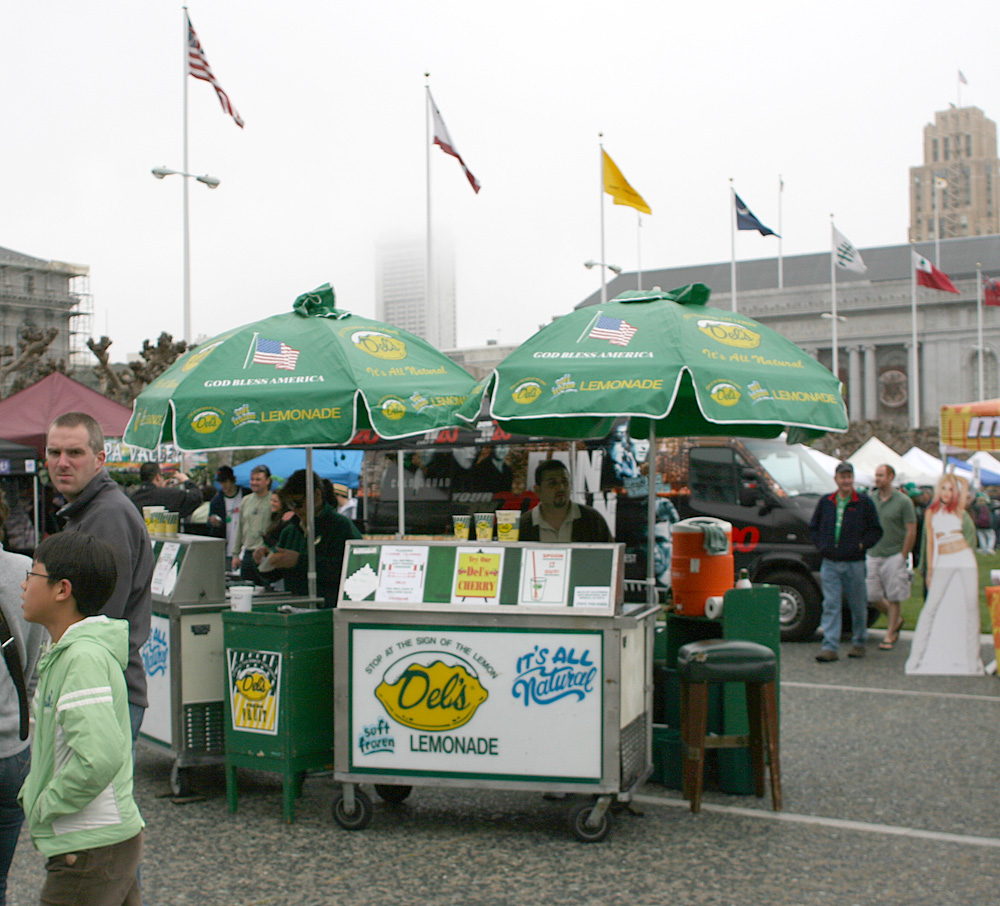
A Del's lemonade stand in San Francisco

- Baron von Lemon
- Lemonade stand
- When life gives you lemons, make lemonade
- Lemonade (Beyoncé album)

== See also ==
- List of juices
- List of lemon dishes and beverages
- Preserved lemon
- Lemon-lime drink
