= Red lemonade =

Irish soft drink

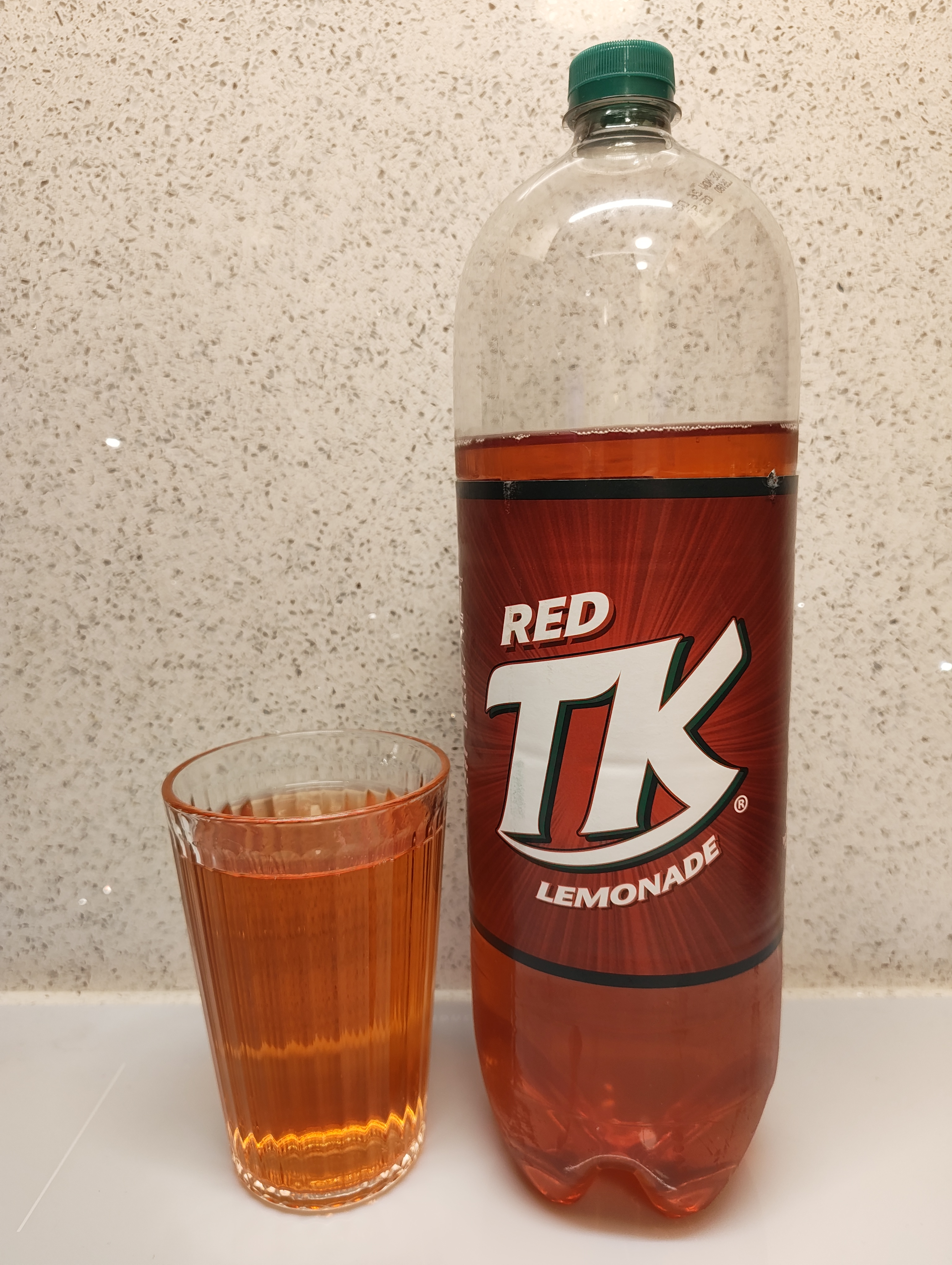
- TK red lemonade
- Type: Lemonade
- Origin: Ireland
- Colour: Red
- Related products: Brown lemonade

Red lemonade (Irish: líomanáid dhearg) is an Irish soft drink that is considered a distinct part of its cultural identity and cuisine.

Lemonade in Ireland traditionally comes in two varieties – red and white. Both are lemon-flavoured, but there is a marked difference in taste between the varieties. Red lemonade is particularly associated with festive occasions, but can also be a folk remedy.

Red lemonade is drunk on its own and is also served as a mixer with spirits in Ireland, particularly in whiskey. Major brands of red lemonade include TK (formerly Taylor Keith), Country Spring, Finches, Nash's, Maine, and C&C. There was an urban myth that red lemonade had been banned in the rest of Europe, but in fact regulators had simply banned a carcinogenic dye.

== See also ==
- Britvic Ireland
- Cavan Cola
- Cidona
- Club
- Football Special
- Tanora
