= Snowball (cocktail) =

Cocktail

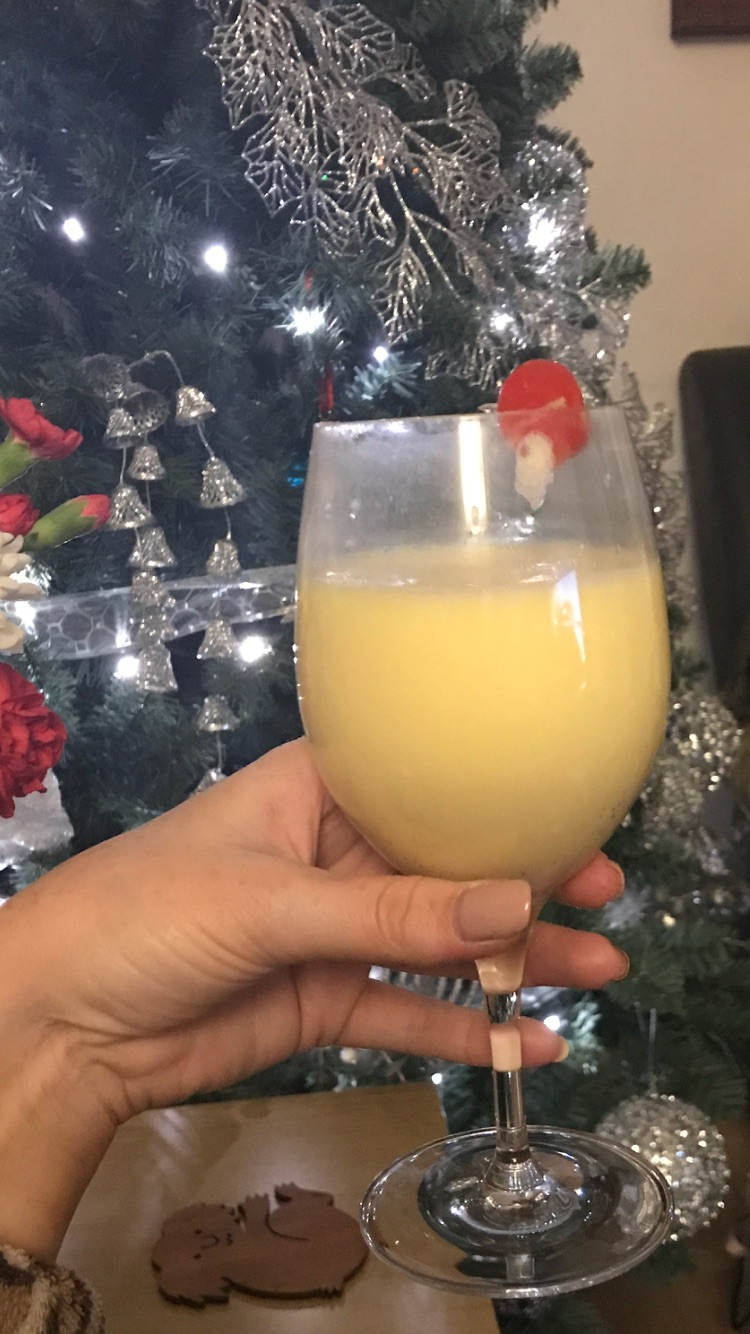
A snowball cocktail

A snowball is a cocktail containing advocaat and carbonated lemonade in approximately equal parts. It may have other ingredients, to taste.

It typically contains a squeeze of fresh lime juice, which is shaken with the advocaat before pouring into a glass and topping up with lemonade.

== See also ==
- List of lemonade topics
- List of lemon dishes and beverages
