= Leed =

Former lemonade soft drink

- Type: Lemonade
- Manufacturer: The Coca-Cola Company
- Distributor: Coca Cola Amatil Ltd
- Origin: Australia
- Introduced: 1967, Adelaide South Australia
- Discontinued: 1984
- Colour: Colourless
- Related products: Sprite, Schweppes

Leed was a carbonated lemonade soft drink sold in the middle and late 20th century.

It was produced and distributed by Coca-Cola Amatil in New Zealand, Australia, the United Kingdom, and Fiji. In 1984, Leed was discontinued and replaced by the more widely known Sprite brand. Accompanying this change was also a new recipe.

Leed Lemon Soda Squash was a variant which was replaced by Mello Yello in the early 1980s.

== See also ==
- List of defunct consumer brands
- List of lemonade topics
