= Leninade =

Soviet-themed lemonade soda

- Type: Soda
- Manufacturer: Real Soda In Real Bottles, Ltd.
- Origin: UK
- Color: Red
- Flavor: Lemonade
- Ingredients: Carbonated water, cane sugar, citric acid, gum acacia, natural and artificial flavor, glyceryl abietate, sodium benzoate
- Website: realsodacompany.com

Leninade (Russian: Ленинад) is a soda based on lemonade made by Real Soda In Real Bottles, Ltd. The name is a portmanteau of "Lenin" and "lemonade", with the packaging having a Soviet theme.

== History ==
The soda has been made since the early 2000s, with the earliest signs of its availability being around 2002. It has been described as a lemonade soda that is colored bright red. It is not caffeinated and its ingredients include carbonated water, cane sugar, citric acid, gum acacia, natural and artificial flavor, glyceryl abietate and sodium benzoate.

== Reception ==
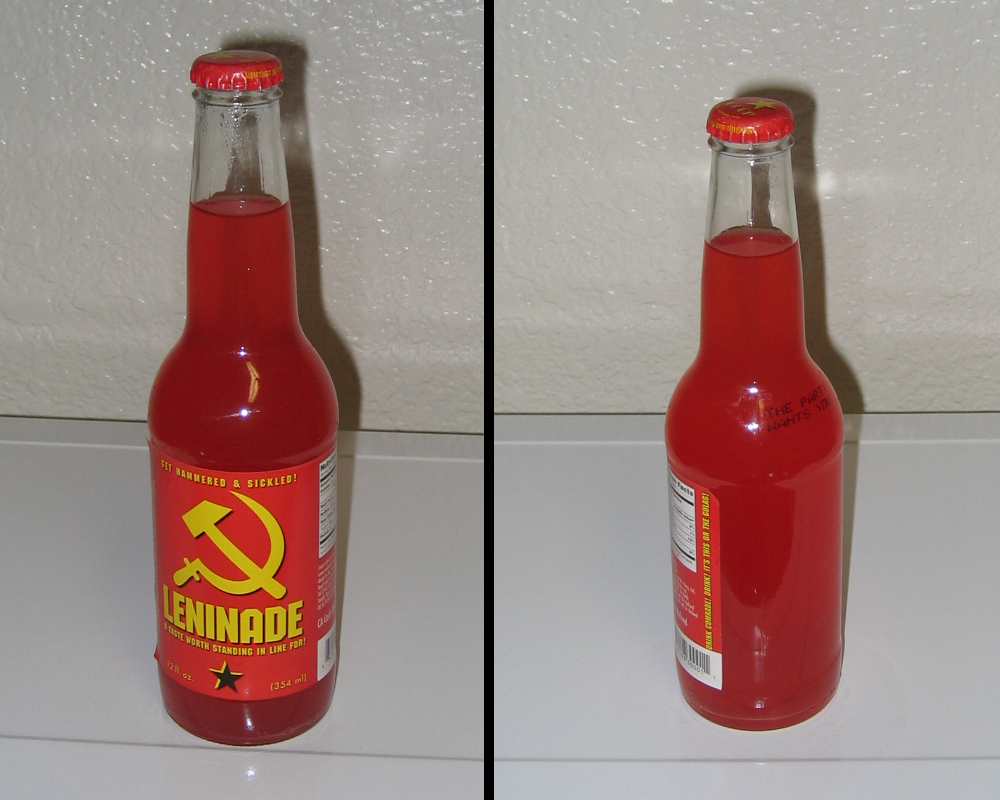
A bottle of Leninade, front and back

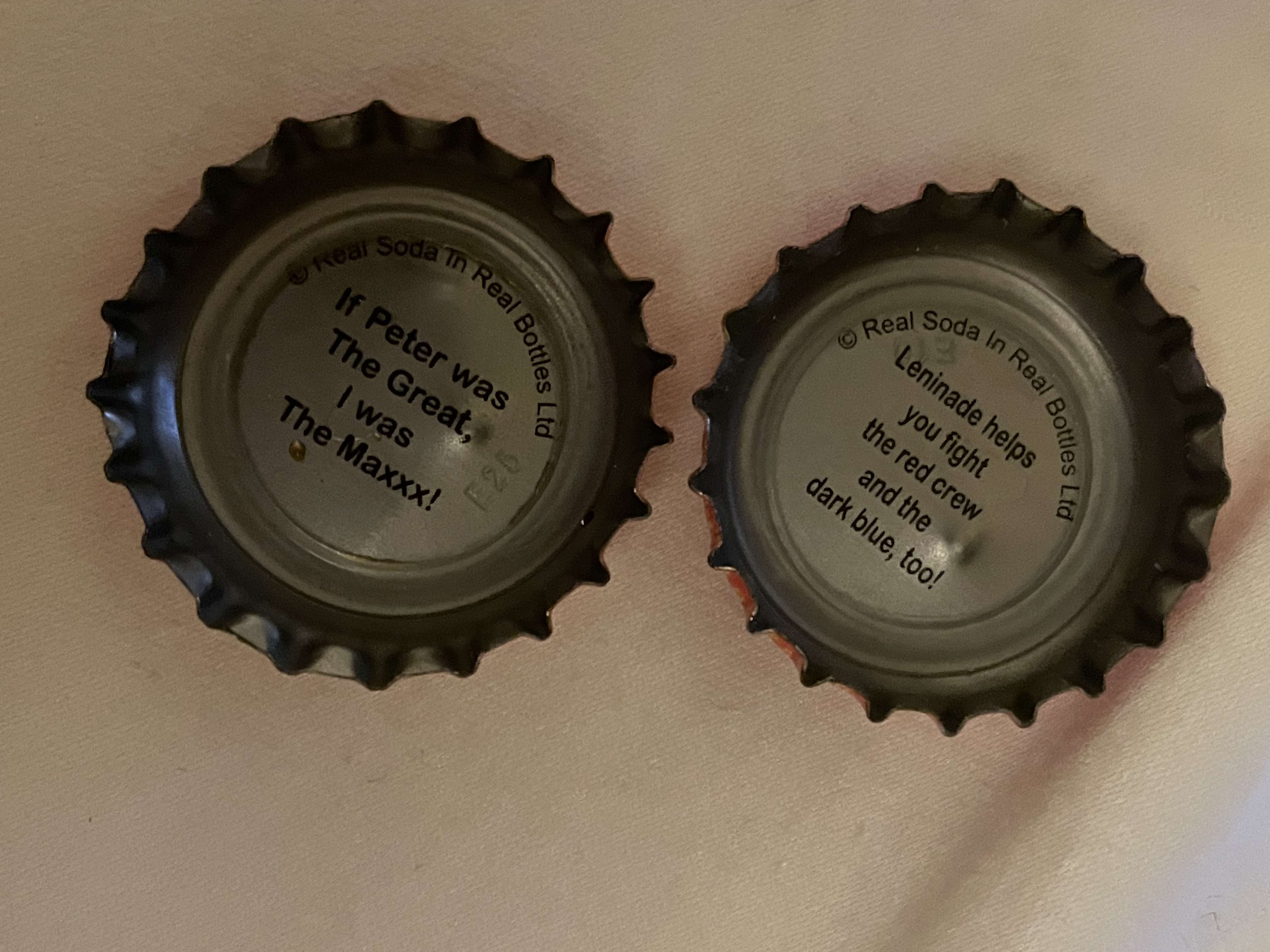
The bottom of bottle caps from Leninade

According to The Huffington Post, the "flavor isn't really Leninade's selling point. It's the Soviet puns stamped to the bottle's label". The slogans on the bottle make fun of Soviet phraseology and propaganda, with phrases such as "A Taste Worth Standing In Line For!", "Get Hammered & Sickled!", "Drink Comrade! Drink! It's This or the Gulag!", "War is Best Served Cold" and "On a hot day, refresh yourself with a cold war".

Katharine Shilcutt of the Houston Press described Leninade as being "like pink lemonade with just light carbonation. I really enjoyed it ... It's a light, fun summer drink to be served with a wink and enjoyed with tongue firmly planted in cheek". In a review of Leninade, Steve Tanner of BevReview said, "The bottle is a nice keepsake by itself, as the graphics are printed directly on the glass ... The bottle itself does not describe the flavor, and upon the sip, it's rather hard to place. There are elements of lemon, citrus, cherry, and grapefruit… at least that's what my tastes buds were saying. ... The non-traditional flavor profile helps it stand alone both in positioning and taste. Leninade is as unique as finding an Eastern Bloc Olympic athlete not using steroids. Recommended!"

== See also ==
- List of lemonade topics
- Communist chic – Elements of popular culture based on Communist symbols
