= Del's =

Frozen lemonade brand

Coordinates: 41.735057°N 71.477442°W

Del's Lemonade & Refreshments, Inc.

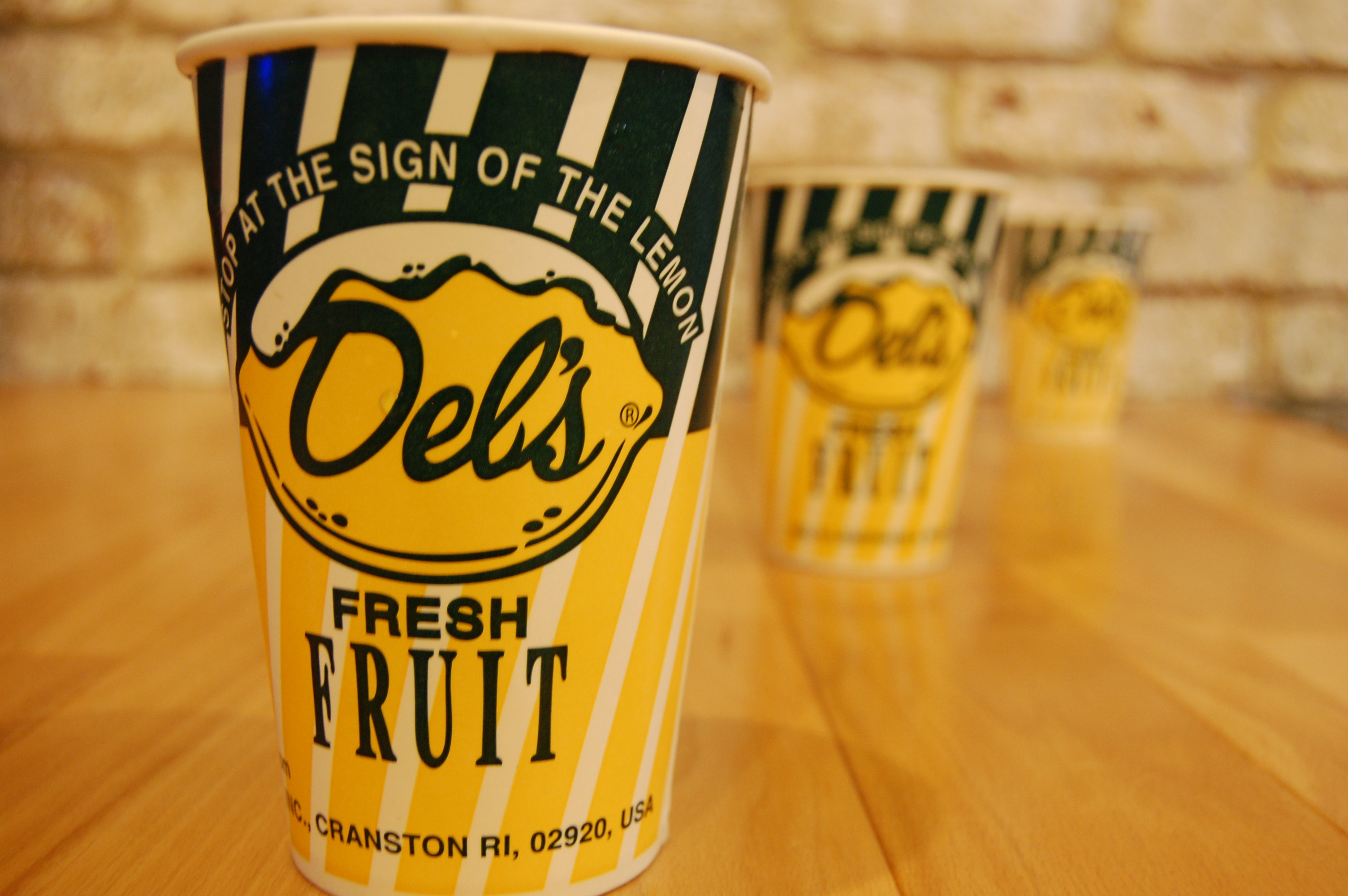
- Paper cups of Del's Lemonade

Restaurant information
- Established: 1948
- Owner: Bruce DeLucia
- Food type: Frozen Lemonade
- Location: Cranston, Rhode Island, United States
- Website: www.dels.com

Del's is a brand of frozen lemonade typically found in Rhode Island and southeastern Massachusetts during the summer. Del's lemonade is available in 20 states. Frozen lemonade is a kind of slush. It is made from water, lemon juice concentrate, and real lemons in an ice cream machine. In Rhode Island and southeastern Massachusetts "Del's" is synonymous with frozen lemonade.

== History ==
Del's was founded by Angelo DeLucia, who originally received the recipe for lemonade from his father, Franco DeLucia, who brought the recipe to the United States from Italy. Angelo then developed a machine to dispense their product.

The first Del's stand was a small, pushable cart in Cranston, Rhode Island, in 1948. Soon afterwards, Angelo started using "Del's Trucks" to serve the beverage anywhere in the state. The company still uses the trucks today, in addition to its storefront locations.

In 1993, the Rhode Island legislature made an attempt to select an official state beverage. Del's lemonade and coffee milk were chosen as "finalists", but coffee milk was eventually chosen as the official state beverage.

The 2011 television movie Lemonade Mouth, a Disney Channel Original Movie adapted from the book of the same name by Massachusetts author Mark Peter Hughes, prominently features "Mel's Frozen Lemonade", which the author has indicated is a parody of Del's.

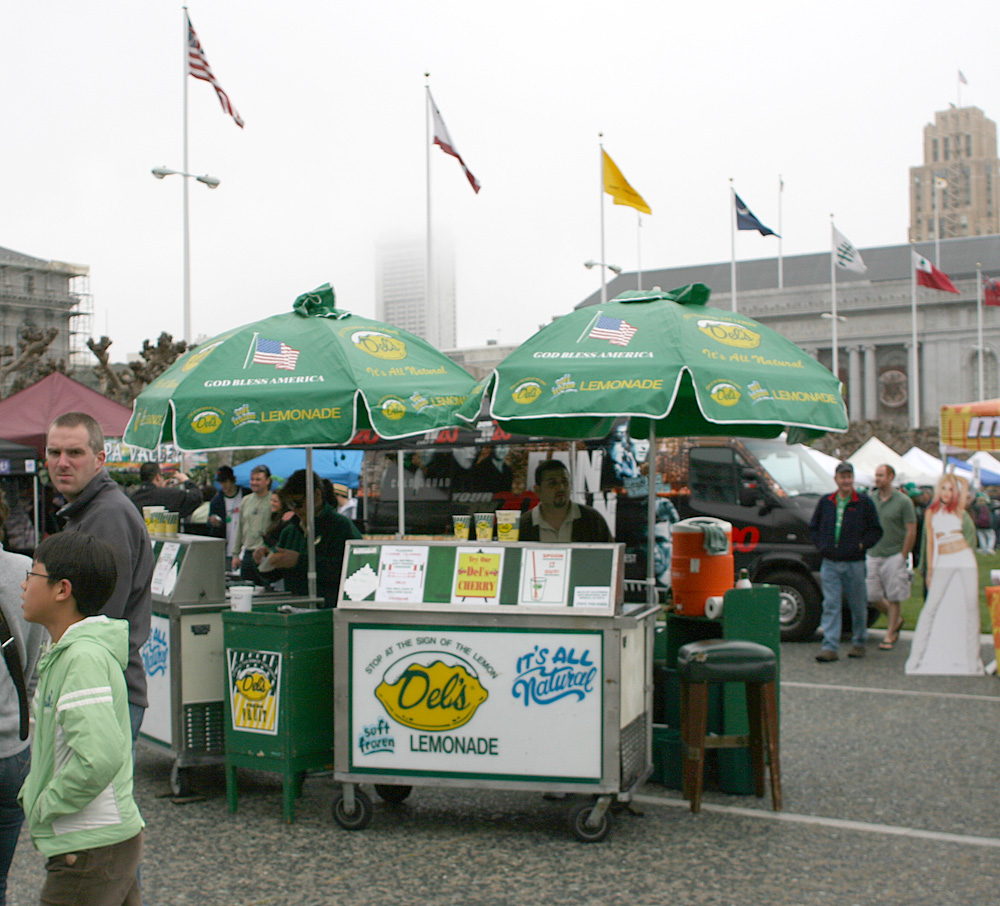
A Del's Lemonade stand in San Francisco

Angelo DeLucia died of prostate cancer on September 6, 2007.

== Products ==
The seven main flavors of the popular drink are lemon, watermelon, peach-mango, blueberry, cherry, grapefruit, and blood orange. Occasionally, extra seasonal flavors, such as tangerine, are added. Coffee was once a flavor, but has not appeared on the menu for many years. Del's also sells other various products, such as pretzel sticks, candy, and popcorn, as well as many different Del's branded products in its gift shop located at its corporate office location and online.

In partnership with Del's, the Narragansett Brewing Company produces a shandy called Del's Shandy.

== Distribution ==
Del's operates franchises selling its products, with 20 locations in Rhode Island, the most of any state, as well as throughout the US, and even internationally. Trucks selling the product are often seen at popular beach locations in summer. The Del's "take-home" mix and non-frozen variety of lemonade can be found in grocery stores throughout the world.

== See also ==
- List of frozen dessert brands
- List of lemonade topics
