= John Daly (cocktail) =

Alcoholic mixed drink

- Type: Mixed drink
- Ingredients: Lemonade and iced tea
- Base spirit: Vodka

A John Daly is an alcoholic mixed drink consisting of lemonade, iced tea, and vodka, named after American golfer John Daly. It can also be made with lemonade and sweet tea vodka (a vodka infusion). The drink is an alcoholic version of the Arnold Palmer (also named after an American golfer); the John Daly cocktail's name is a tongue-in-cheek reference to Daly's public struggles with alcoholism.

The drink was initially made popular at the Whiskey Creek Golf Course in Fort Myers, Florida, by bartender Daton Lewis during Daly's 2005 run at the Dirty Gator Open. Daly considered the use of his name without authorization to be trademark infringement. In response, Daly formed the GIASI Beverage Company in 2010 with two of his close friends. Daly is the majority share holder. GIASI stands for "Grip It And Sip It", a play on words of his "Grip it and Rip it" catch phrase. Bottled by Frank-Lin Distiller's in Fairfield, California, the official Original John Daly Cocktail came to market in 2013. Initial reach in California and Nevada has swept to 13 states including his home state of Arkansas, Texas and Illinois. GIASI offers three different flavors of the 30 proof ABV vodka-based 'READY TO DRINK' cocktail: sweet tea/lemonade, peach tea/lemonade, and raspberry tea/lemonade.

== Variations ==
One variation is the Southern-Style John Daly, which includes bourbon and mint in place of the vodka.

== See also ==
- List of lemonade topics
- Queen Mary (cocktail)
