= Limonada =

Limonada may refer to:

- Limeade
- Limonada cimarrona a type of limeade, used as a "chaser" in Nicaragua
- La Limonada, Guatemala, the largest slum in Latin America outside Brazil
- Limonada, variant of Lemon (card game) with Uno cards
- Limonada, a book by Héctor Zumbado 1978
- Limonada, album by Polbo 2009
- Limonada (album), album by Kany Garcia 2016
- limonada (Barry), the second episode of the third season of American television series Barry
