= McDaid's Football Special =

Irish soft drink

Football Special
- Type: Soft drink
- Manufacturer: McDaid's & Sons
- Origin: Ramelton, Ireland
- Introduced: 1960s
- Website: football-special.com

McDaid's Football Special is an Irish soft drink (locally known as a 'mineral') produced by McDaid's & Sons, a company based in Ramelton, County Donegal.

== History ==
Football Special was created during the 1960s when James McDaid Jnr., then CEO of McDaid's & Sons, who was also on the founding board of Swilly Rovers Football Club, wanted to celebrate the club winning trophies by filling the cup with a non-alcoholic beverage. They created a drink which had a beer-like foamy head and named it 'Football Cup', which later was changed to Football Special.

The original factory in Ramelton was formerly a creamery.

In 1984 and 1989, Football Special won two awards for excellence from the London Beverage Society.

== Production ==
Football Special was originally made and bottled at the Swilly Bottling Stores by McDaid's & Sons in Ramelton in North Donegal. However, since 2014, all of McDaid's products, including Football Special, have been made and bottled by Maine Soft Drinks Ltd in Ballymoney, County Antrim.

Some McDaid's products, including Football Special, are also manufactured under license by the Reading Soda Works in Reading, Pennsylvania.

== Distribution ==
Football Special is found most commonly on sale throughout County Donegal, where it was originally produced. However, it is also available in selected retailers throughout Ireland and beyond.

From 19 September 2024, Football Special was sold nationwide for a limited time in Lidl Ireland, and has since been available there in several limited runs.

Beyond Ireland, Football Special is also sold in several shops in Glasgow in Scotland, Perth in Australia, and the East Coast of the United States, notably New York, Boston and Philadelphia.

== See also ==
- Cavan Cola
- Cidona
- Club
- Red Lemonade
