= When life gives you lemons, make lemonade =

Proverb

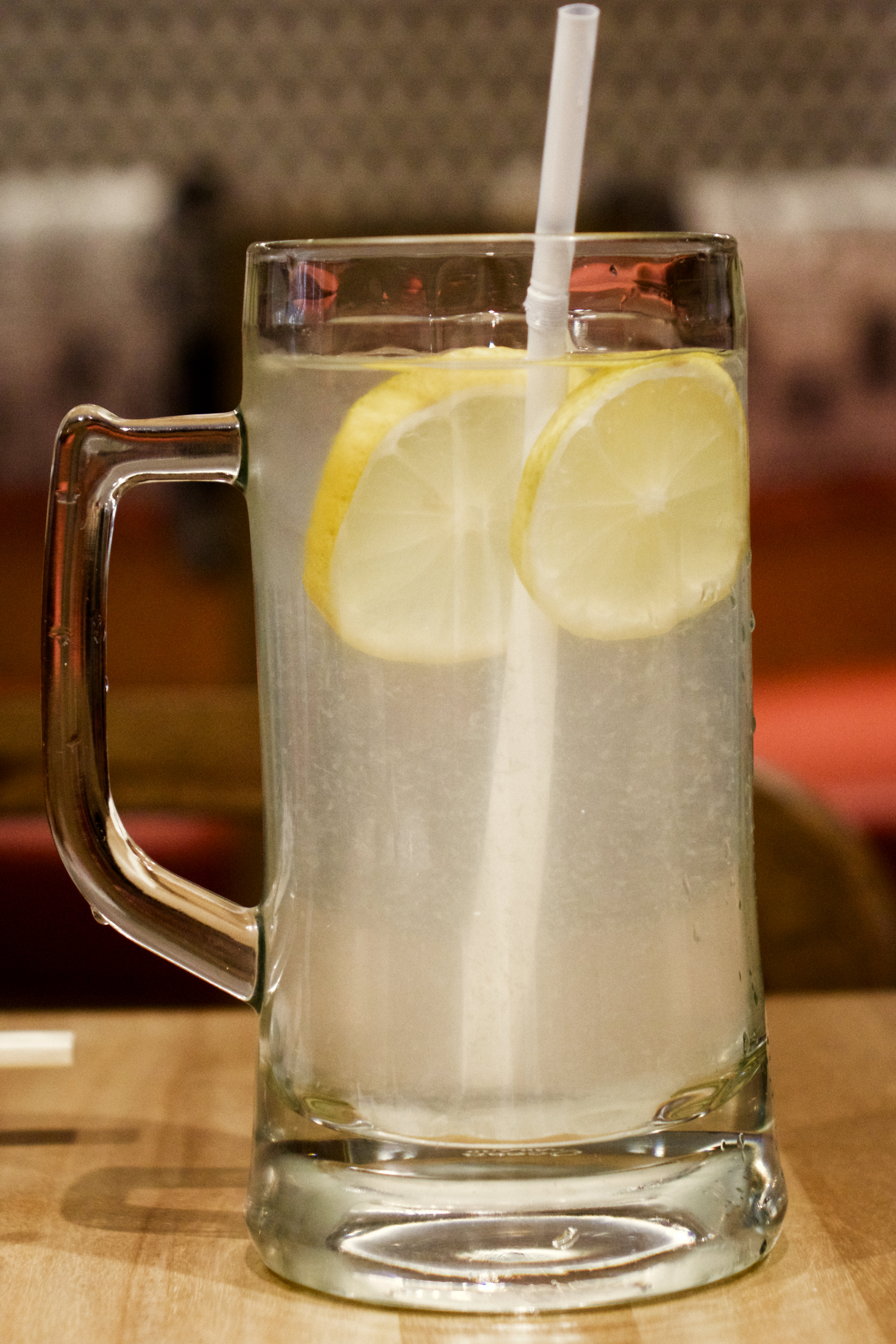
Drinking lemonade is usually considered more pleasant than eating raw lemons.

When life gives you lemons, make lemonade is a proverbial phrase used to encourage optimism and a positive can-do attitude in the face of adversity or misfortune. Lemons suggest sourness or difficulty in life; making lemonade is turning them into something positive or desirable.

== Origins ==
The sentiment has often been expressed in varying words. Its first known print use, as attributed to Christian anarchist writer Elbert Hubbard in 1909 in Literary Digest, reads: "A genius is a man who takes the lemons that Fate hands him and starts a lemonade-stand with them." He also used it in a 1915 obituary he penned and published for actor Marshall Pinckney Wilder. The obituary, entitled The King of Jesters, praises Wilder's optimistic attitude and achievements in the face of his disabilities:

He was a walking refutation of that dogmatic statement, Mens sana in corpore sano. His was a sound mind in an unsound body. He proved the eternal paradox of things. He cashed in on his disabilities. He picked up the lemons that Fate had sent him and started a lemonade-stand.

Although the first two known uses in print are by Hubbard, many modern authors attribute the expression to Dale Carnegie who used it in his 1948 book How to Stop Worrying and Start Living. Carnegie's version reads "If You Have a Lemon, Make a Lemonade." Carnegie credited Julius Rosenwald for giving him the phrase.

== Variations ==
The September 1916 edition of the Auburn Seminary Record printed another early use of the expression: "[Hugh K. Walker] described a pessimist as one who fletcherizes his bitter pill, the optimist as the man who made lemonade of the lemon handed him."

Eight years before Carnegie's book brought the phrase back into the mainstream, a poetic rendition of the phrase entitled The Optimist appeared in a 1940 edition of The Rotarian:

Life handed him a lemon,
As Life sometimes will do.
His friends looked on in pity,
Assuming he was through.
They came upon him later,
Reclining in the shade
In calm contentment, drinking
A glass of lemonade.

In 1944, during Homer E. Capehart's first run for Senate, he became known for saying "I have never been afraid of trouble. I have always had this slogan: If somebody hands you a lemon, make lemonade of it."

A popular humorous 21st-century alternative version of the phrase, verging on sarcasm, is "When life gives you melons, you're dyslexic."

== In popular culture ==
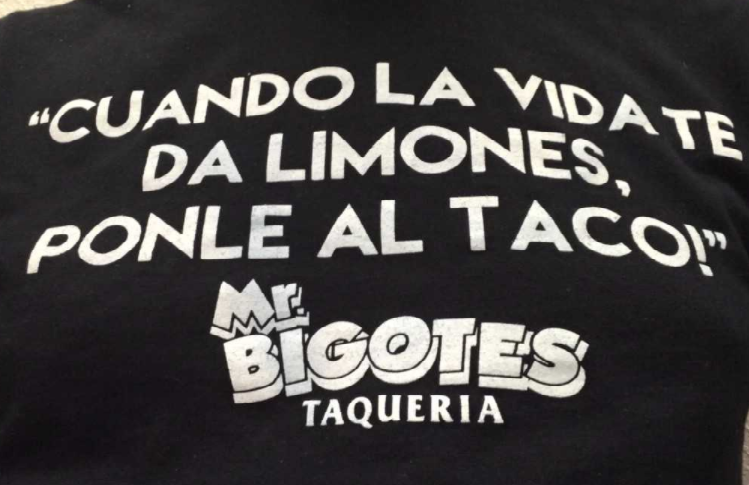
T-shirt using a twisted Spanish-language version of the proverb, an anti-proverb, to advertise a taqueria: "When life gives you lemons/limes, put it on a taco."

=== Marketing ===
A commercial for Super Bowl LV advertising Bud Light Seltzer Lemonade mentions 2020 being a "lemon of a year" (a reference to the COVID-19 pandemic) showing lemons literally falling from the sky. Someone was about to say the phrase but someone else cuts him off by saying they all already knew it.

As the term can also be seen as a positive outcome of marketing, there are a few marketing agencies such as Make Lemonade in London who have adopted the phrase to represent their business.

=== Music ===
"El gran varón", a 1986 salsa song performed by Willie Colón, cites many popular proverbs, including the phrase: "Si del cielo te caen limones, aprende a hacer limonada" ("If lemons fall from the sky on you, learn to make lemonade").

In 2008, American hip-hop group Atmosphere titled their fifth studio album When Life Gives You Lemons, You Paint That Shit Gold, with reference to the original phrase.

In 2016, some music critics reported that Beyoncé's sixth studio album title, Lemonade, was a reference to the optimistic phrase, referring to the themes drawn in the album, and also with her promotions and marketing strategy for the project. Some journalists wrote that the speech delivered by the singer's grandmother-in-law Hattie White at the end of the song "Freedom" was a clear reference to the motto and inspired the album title. White said in the speech that "I had my ups and downs, but I always find the inner strength to pull myself up. I was served lemons, but I made lemonade".

=== Cinema, television and video games ===
The initial opening theme for Mystery Science Theater 3000 included the lyric "Joel says when you got lemons, you make lemonade." This was changed when the show was broadcast nationally.

In Portal 2, one of the supporting characters, Cave Johnson, gives a speech through a recorded message where he contests whether one should make lemonade when life gives one lemons. When he finds out that he has a terminal illness, he goes on an angry rant, saying that life should not give out lemons at all, threatening life itself with burning its house down by using combustible lemons.

In Kung Fu Panda 4 (2024), the main protagonist, Po, stated "When life gives you lemons, make pear juice and blow everyone's minds!"

In the Parks and Recreation episode "The Bubble" (S3 EP 15), in a tough office relocation, Andy Dwyer, a supporting character, uses the motto to encourage coworker Tom Haverford by claiming "I read that once on a can of lemonade. But I like to think that it applies to life." In a talking head, Tom says that he doesn't want to turn lemons into lemonade, but would instead prefer to "slice them up into wedges and throw them into vodka tonics."

=== Literature ===
Warren Hinckle's 1974 autobiography detailing his time as chief editor of Ramparts is called If You Have a Lemon, Make Lemonade.

== Cultural use ==
The saying has become a popular calque in Hispanic culture.

== See also ==
- List of lemonade topics
- Carpe diem
