= Lemonade stand =

Business commonly owned by children

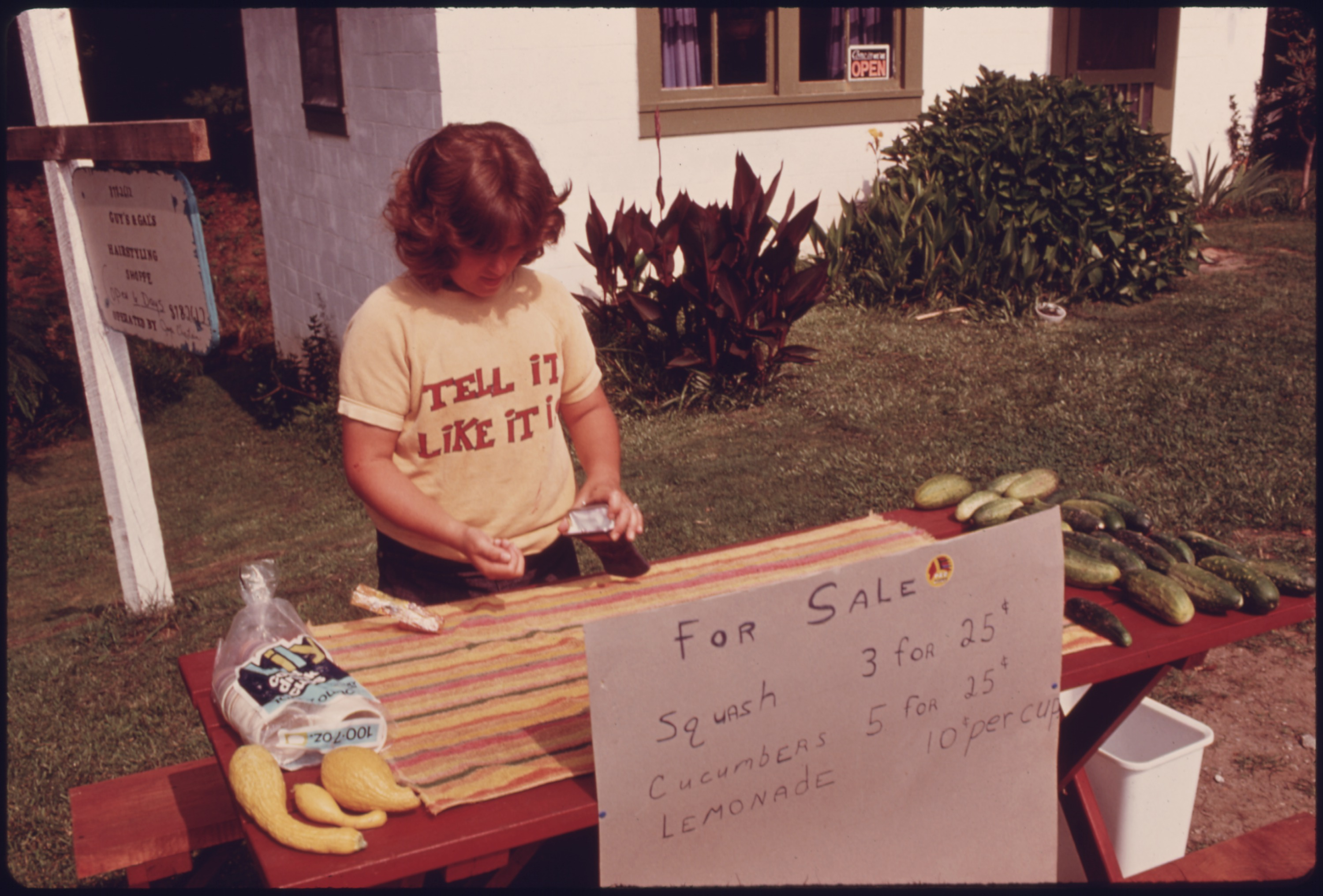
A roadside lemonade stand in Georgia, July 1975, also selling squash and cucumbers

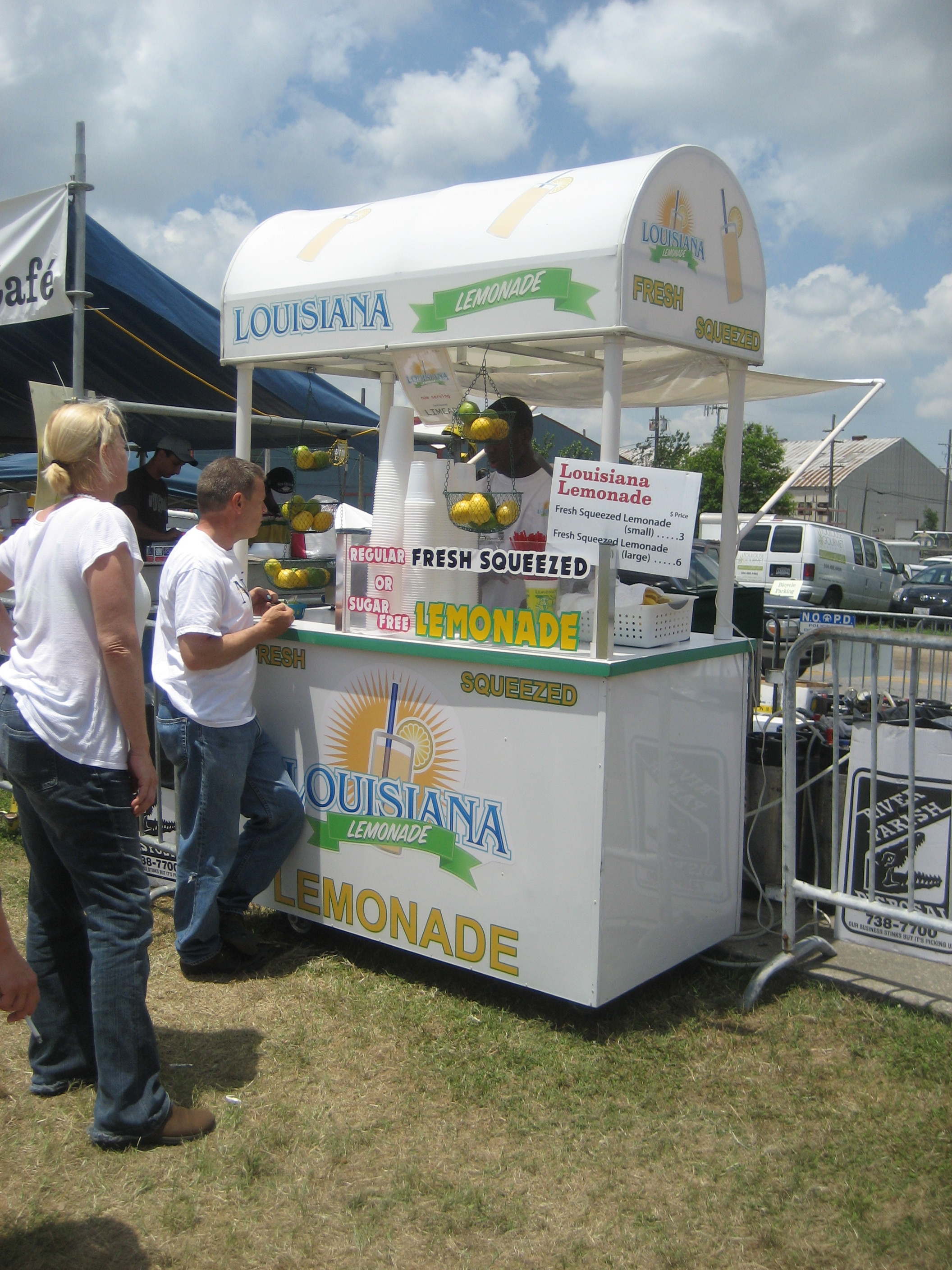
A professional vendor in New Orleans

A lemonade stand is a business that is commonly owned and operated by children to sell lemonade. The concept has become an icon of youthful summertime North American culture. The term may also be used to refer to stands that sell similar beverages such as iced tea and soda. They are typically erected in the summer.

The stand may be a folding table or crafted out of an improvised material such as plywood or cardboard.

== Educational benefits ==
Lemonade stands are often viewed as a way for children to experience business at a young age. The ideas of profit, economic freedom, and teamwork are often attributed to traits lemonade stands can instill. However, unlike a real business, they benefit from free labor, no rent, and lack of expenses.

== Legality ==
In some areas, lemonade stands are usually in technical violation of several laws, including operation without a business license and/or permit, lack of adherence to health codes, and sometimes child labor laws. Lemonade stands have been known to spread disease due to poor sanitation, including a 1941 case in Chicago where 12 people were infected with poliovirus, five of whom were paralyzed, from a child's lemonade stand.

Enforcement of these laws for lemonade stand operations are extremely rare, but have been known to occur, typically to public outcry. In June 2015, police in Overton, Texas told children running a lemonade stand that they would need to apply for a permit and check with the health department before selling perishable food.

In 2018, Country Time created Legal-Ade, which pays up to $300 of the legal fees for lemonade stands fined in 2017 or 2018, or for 2018 permits.

The New York Legislature took up a bill in 2019 that, if passed, will explicitly make lemonade stands operated by minors legal and exempt from most regulations. As of that summer, fourteen U.S. states explicitly allow operation of a lemonade stand without a permit.

== See also ==
- List of lemonade topics
