= Lemon water =

Lemon juice and water

Lemon water is a beverage made by mixing lemon juice with water.

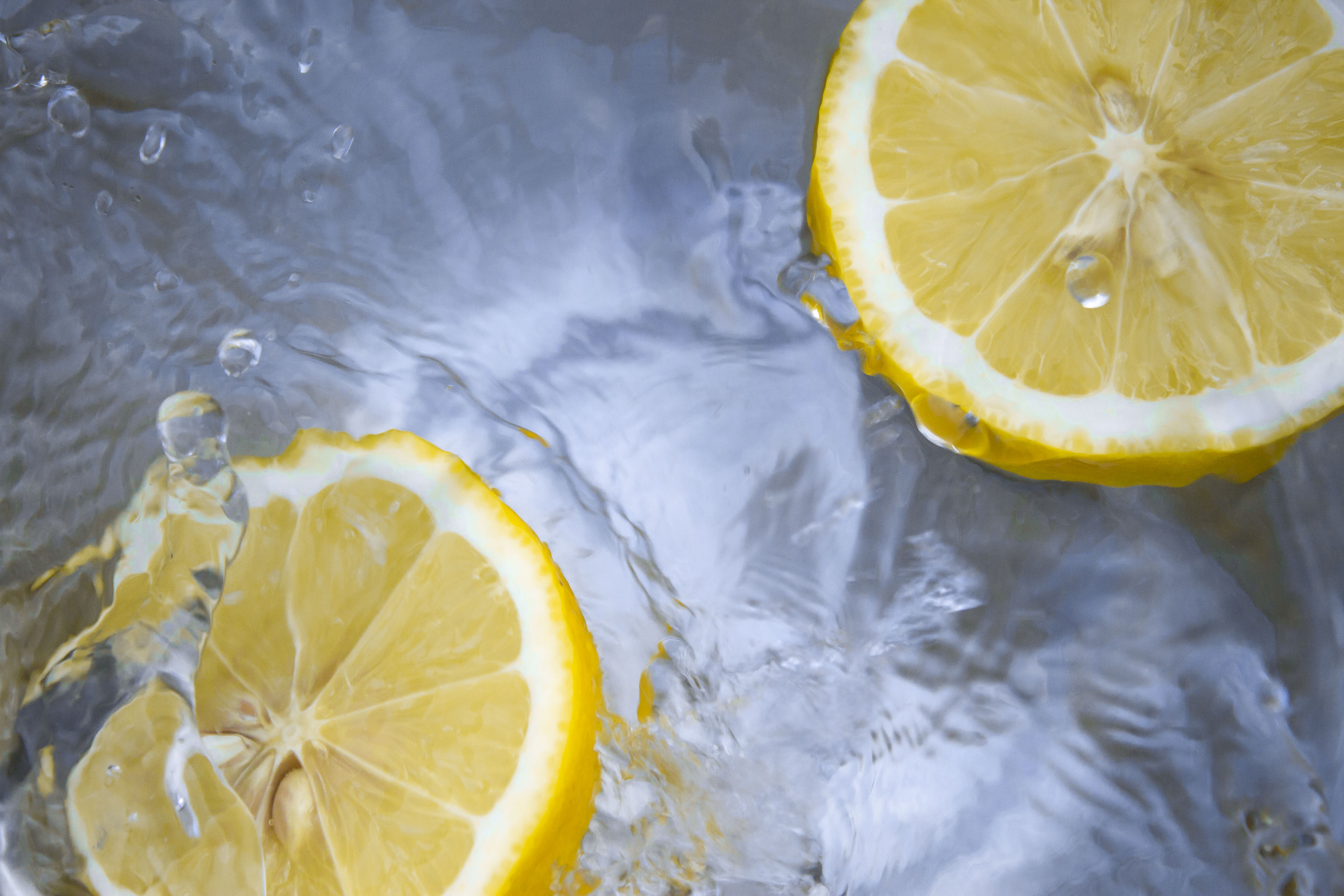
Lemon slices floating in water

It is commonly consumed as part of everyday dietary or lifestyle habits. Lemon water mainly provides hydration along with small amounts of nutrients naturally found in lemon juice, including vitamin C.

== Common preparation and variations ==
Lemon water is usually prepared by adding freshly squeezed lemon juice to cold or warm water. A common method uses the juice of half a lemon in a glass of water, though the amount varies by preference. Squeezing the lemon for its juice is not required for preparation.

Some people add ingredients such as spearmint or ginger for flavor. These additions mainly affect taste and do not significantly change the nutritional value of the drink.

The main difference between lemon water and lemonade is that lemonade usually contains sweeteners (usually in the form of sugar, honey, high fructose corn syrup or sugar substitutes), while lemon water is unsweetened.

== Nutritional content ==
=== Basic nutrients ===
Lemon water is low in calories due to the low amount of carbohydrates compared to other juices and the negligible amounts of protein and fat.

Lemon juice contains small amounts of vitamin C and citric acid, with a citric acid concentration of about 48 g/L. When diluted in water, the overall nutrient content remains modest compared to the nutritional content of the whole lemon.

Lemon water (prepared with juice of half a lemon in 250 ml water)
Nutritional value per 100 g (3.5 oz)
- Energy: 20 kJ (4.8 kcal)
- Carbohydrates: 2.5 g
- Sugars: 0.8 g
- Dietary fiber: 0.1 g
- Fat: 0 g
- Protein: 0.2 g
Vitamins and minerals
Vitamins	Quantity %DV^{†}
Vitamin C	17% 15 mg
Minerals	Quantity %DV^{†}
Potassium	1% 40 mg
- Estimated values based on dilution of lemon juice in water; actual values vary by preparation.
- ^{†}Percentages estimated using US recommendations for adults, except for potassium, which is estimated based on expert recommendation from the National Academies.

Lemon water contributes to hydration and supplies small amounts of nutrients derived from lemon juice. Its nutritional value depends on the quantity of juice used and is substantially lower than that of whole lemons due to dilution in water.

Because the pulp and peel are typically removed during preparation, lemon water contains little to no dietary fiber.

=== Comparison with whole fruit ===
Compared to consuming whole lemons, lemon water provides fewer nutrients because it consists primarily of diluted lemon juice and water. Whole lemons contain dietary fiber, particularly soluble fiber such as pectin, which is largely absent in lemon water due to the removal of pulp and peel during preparation.

In addition to fiber, whole lemons provide a broader range of micronutrients and plant-derived compounds, including amino acids, fatty acids, and polyphenols, many of which are concentrated in the pulp and peel and are present in reduced amounts when only lemon juice is diluted in water.

== Society and culture ==
During the COVID-19 pandemic, a misinformation campaign occurred where lemon water was falsely claimed to have contained the ability to induce abortion, stabilise the metabolism, and cure cancer, despite being consistently demonstrated as false. Lemon water is also used as part of some diets alongside regular water.
