= Lemonsoda =

Italian drink with lemons

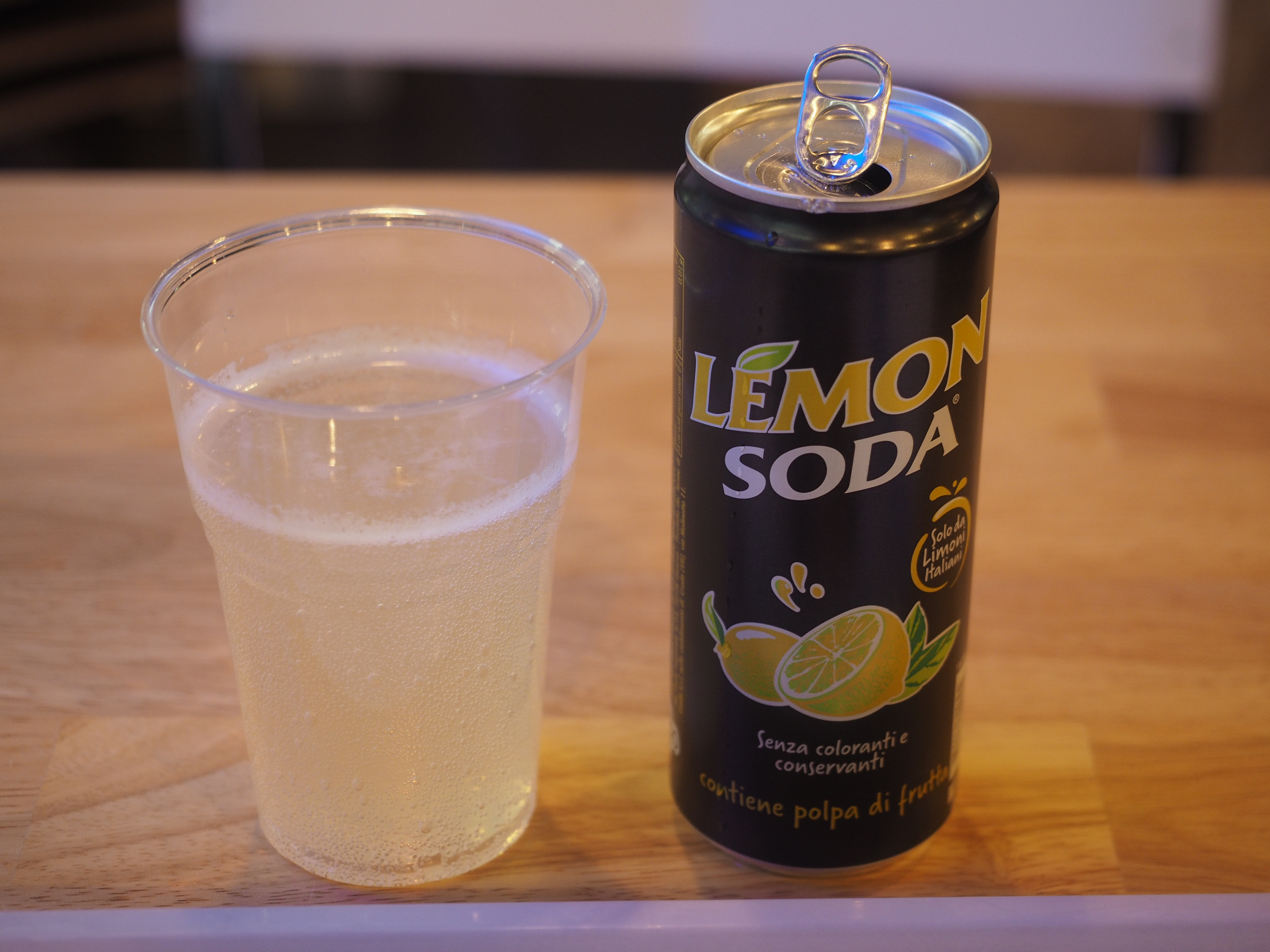
A can of Lemonsoda

Lemonsoda is the hero product of the brand Fonti di Crodo. An Italian carbonated soft drinks created in the 1940s by Milan-based company Saga and currently owned by Royal Unibrew.

== History ==
The original Fonti di Crodo flavor was lemon. Oransoda and Pelmosoda, orange and grapefruit-flavored sodas, were introduced in the following years. In 1980 the brand was sold to Crodo, which became part of the Campari Group in 1999. During the 2003/2004 season Lemonsoda was the official sponsor of Lecce football club. In 2005, a tonic water titled Tonicsoda was the first Lemonsoda product born under the Campari brand. In 2010, two new versions of traditional Lemonsoda were created: sugarless Lemonsoda Zero and the Mojitosoda, a non-alcoholic cocktail made with lemon juice and mint flavor, flavored like a mojito cocktail. In October 2017, the Lemonsoda brand was sold to Royal Unibrew for 80 million Euro.

== Today's Influence ==
Nowadays, this drink is sold in places all across Europe at an accesible price. Although it is not a major brand, it can be found in shops, canteens, vending machines etc, mostly in Italy, and neighbouring countries such as the Balkan States, Austria, Germany, Bulgaria, Hungary, Poland and even outside European countries like the USA or Canada.

== See also ==
- List of lemonade topics
