= Maine Soft Drinks Ltd =

Soft drinks company in Northern Ireland

Glaret Maine Soft Drinks Ltd. is a company based in Ballymoney, County Antrim, Northern Ireland, which sells soft drinks, cordials and aerated waters. During the early 21st-century recession, it remained in Ballymoney while several other companies with large numbers of employees disappeared. The company was founded by John Harkness in 1949, and is named after the River Maine.

== Traditional Peacock Blue Lorries ==
As well as having a presence in retail outlets, Maine is also known for its fleet of distinctive green lorries which deliver soft drinks door to door in Counties Antrim, Londonderry and Down. The person driving the lorries is often known colloquially as "The Lemonade Man" or The Maine Man or more commonly The Mineral Man.

Many of the products sold by Maine are specific to them in Ulster, such as American Kola, Scottish Cola, and Limeade; and some are specific to Ulster but not to Maine, such as Brown Lemonade.

Maine Men can still be found on the streets of Ulster and deliver 6 days a week to thousands of locals. They cover all of Northern Ireland and parts of County Donegal.

== Products ==
As of 2023, Maine sells the following products:

- Maine - Soft drinks, lemonade, soft drinks and diluted juice
- McDaid's Football Special - Mixed flavored soft drink
- Vitazade - Small soft drinks

== Depots ==
There are depots in Belfast, Mallusk and Derry.

== Controversy ==
In 1998, Maine Soft Drinks product Smak drew the ire of anti-drugs campaigners in Scotland when it went on sale there, saying that it could trivialise heroin abuse.
