= Mint lemonade =

Lemonade flavored with mint

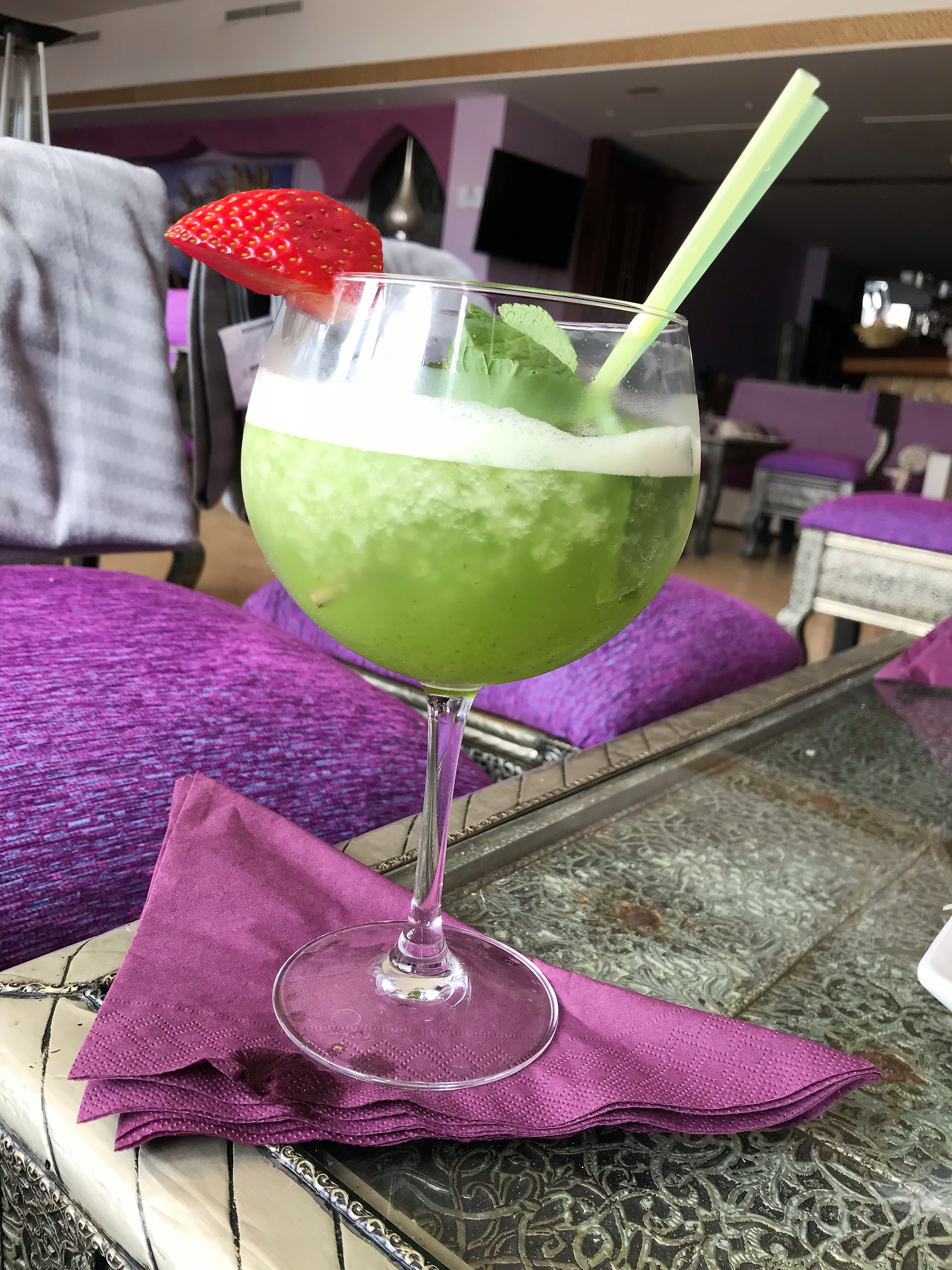
- Mint lemonade in Spain
- Type: Lemonade
- Ingredients: Lemon juice, sugar or honey, water, mint, ice cubes

Mint lemonade is lemonade flavored with mint. It may be made with whole mint leaves, mint-flavored syrup, or pureed mint leaves, and may be served over ice cubes or blended with ice into a slush or smoothie. It is sometimes called a virgin mojito.

It is found in North America, Europe, Latin America, and the Middle East, and is attested since the early 20th century.

== Preparation ==
The mint flavor may be added to lemonade in various ways:

- Fresh mint leaves, sometimes simply as a garnish.
- Muddled mint leaves.
- Processing the mint with the lemon juice in a blender.
- Mint syrup, made by simmering mint leaves in sugar water.
- Crème de menthe liqueur.

It may be mixed with still or sparkling water.

It may be served over ice, or blended with ice to make a slush, smoothie, or granita.

There are also bottled versions.

== History ==
A recipe for mint lemonade was provided by 13th century Andalusian scholar Ibn al-Baytar, it called for using sugar, lemon juice, mint, and water.

The drink is very popular within Israel, sometimes called the “National drink of Israel”, although this title is unofficial. It is primarily consumed during the summer months.

== Variants ==
Variants may add ingredients such as ginger, maple syrup, lime juice, black salt and apple juice.

== Adding spirits ==
Various spirits may be added to it, including arak, tequila ("mint margarita"), bourbon (a "lemon and mint julep"), gin, etc.

== As a flavor ==
Mint lemonade may also be made into sorbets, ice pops, and so on.

== Names ==
In Israel, it is called limonana, a portmanteau of limon Hebrew: לימון 'lemon' and naʿnaʿ Hebrew: נענע 'mint'. The word was coined for an advertising campaign to promote bus advertising, in which various celebrities were shown promoting a drink called "Limonana", a blend of lemon and mint, which was in the end revealed to be fictitious.
