= Limonada cimarrona =

Limeade used as a chaser in Nicaragua

Limonada cimarrona is a type of limeade, used as a chaser in Nicaragua, specifically used with white dry rums, or local guaro. Instead of using plain water, soda water is used with lime juice (Note: in Nicaragua, "limón" usually means lime- see limón) and salt added to taste.

== See also ==
- List of lemonade topics
