= Cavan Cola =

Brand of soft drink

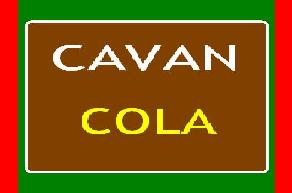
- Type: Cola
- Manufacturer: Cavan Mineral Water
- Origin: Ireland
- Introduced: 1958; 68 years ago
- Discontinued: 2001; 25 years ago
- Colour: Caramel
- Related products: Score Cola, Cadet Cola

Cavan Cola was a brand of soft drink produced by Cavan Mineral Water Ltd. in the town of Cavan, Ireland. It was introduced in 1958, and was sold in 250 ml bottles in shops in counties Cavan, Monaghan, Sligo, Leitrim, Louth, Donegal and Meath.

== Product ==
Originally branded as Cavan Kola when it was launched in 1958, Cavan Cola was sold in small 250ml bottles, with a distinctive green "book" label. The taste was described as being slightly sweeter than Coca-Cola, with a slightly liquorice flavour with a frothy head. It was popular in Cavan, and at the peak of its popularity (late 1980s/early 1990s), the product often outsold global brands (like Coke and Pepsi) in shops in County Cavan and County Leitrim and the surrounding area. Cavan Cola was one of numerous soft drinks or "minerals" that were produced and sold locally across Ireland in the 20th century.

The product proved so popular there that it went national in the early 1990s. In 1993, the family-run Cavan Mineral Water Ltd. was taken over by Finches, who began phasing out Cavan Cola. By 2001, Cavan Cola had been removed from sale.

== Revival Attempts ==
After the withdrawal of Cavan Cola in 2001, it has been the subject of several campaigns to revive it. The new parent company has thus far refused to bring it back. For a short time in the late 1990s, Cavan Cola was distributed in Dublin.
