= Lemonade =

Lemon-flavored drink

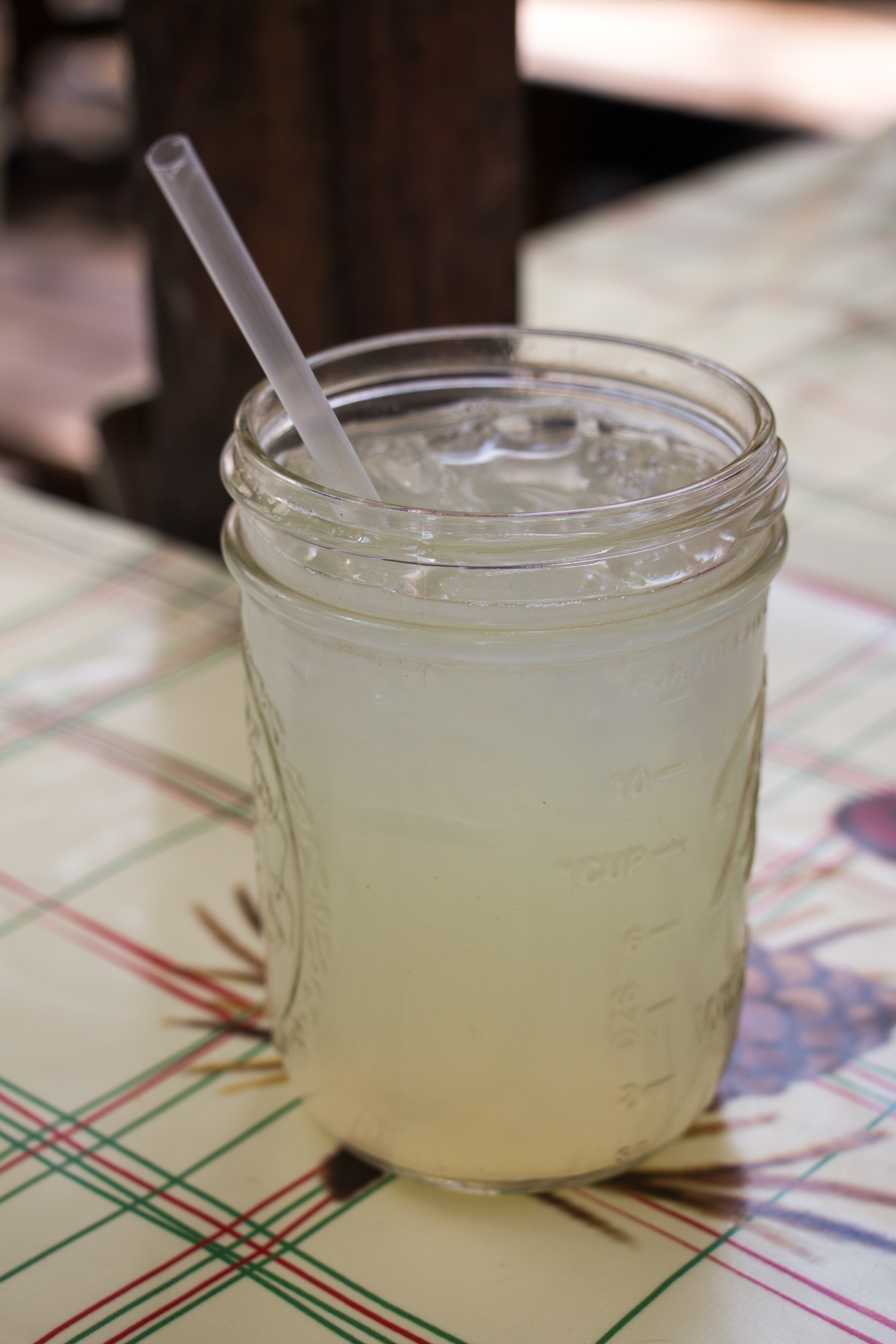
Glass of homemade lemonade

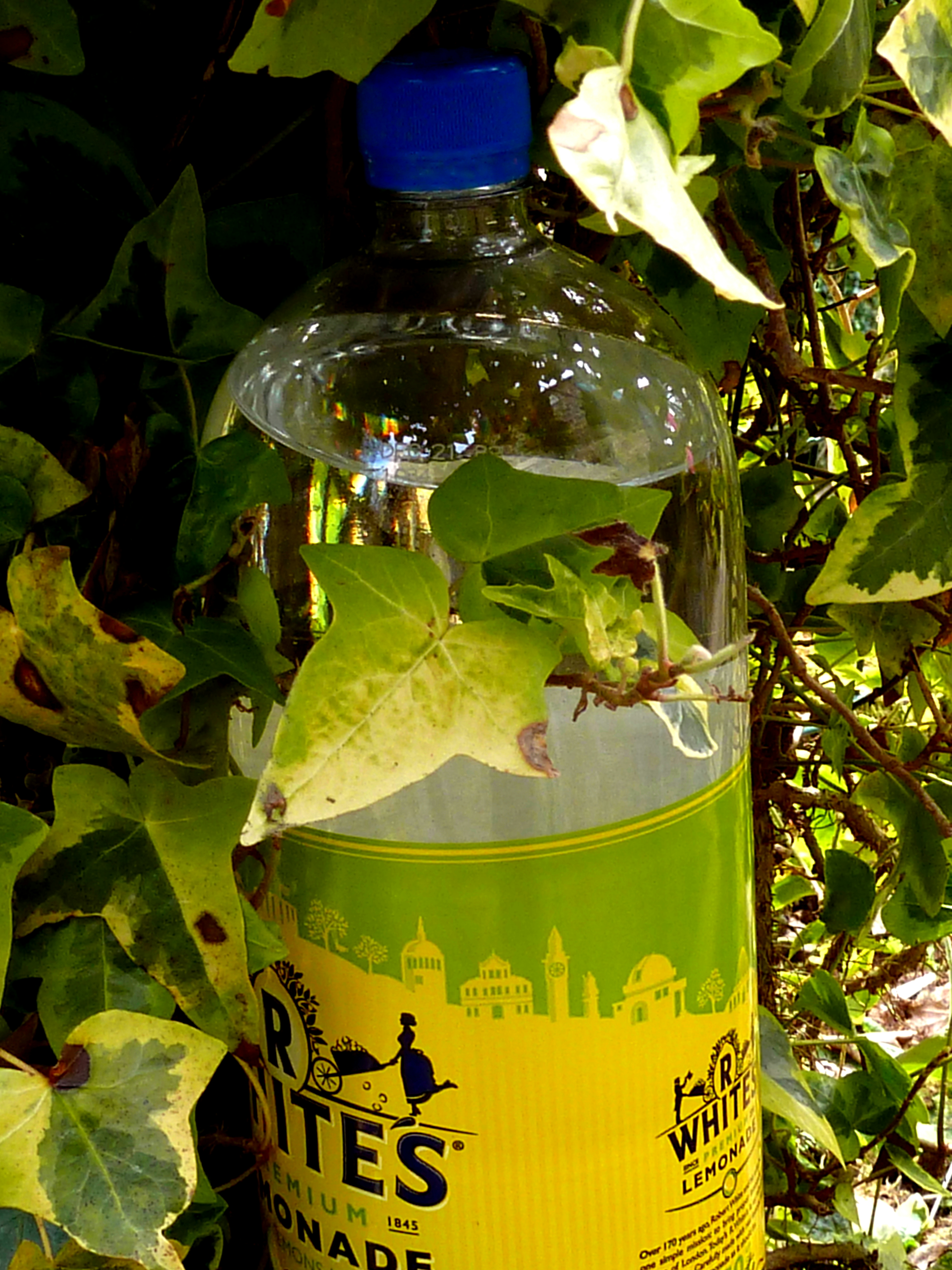
Carbonated lemonade (R. White's lemonade soft drink pictured)

Lemonade is a sweetened or unsweetened lemon-flavored drink that may be carbonated or un-carbonated; when carbonated, it is sometimes called a lemon soda. There are many varieties of lemonade found throughout the world.

Historically and in many parts of the world, lemonade refers to an un-carbonated beverage, traditionally homemade, using lemon juice, water, and a sweetener such as cane sugar, simple syrup, maple syrup or honey. In other parts of the world, it is most commonly a reference to a carbonated lemon-flavoured soft drink or soda. Despite the differences between the drinks, each is known simply as "lemonade" in countries where it is dominant.

The suffix "-ade" may also be applied to other similar drinks made with different fruits, such as limeade, orangeade, or cherryade.

== History ==
One of the first recipes for a lemon-based drink was documented in the 12th century Egyptian treatise On Lemon, Its Drinking and Use by the court physician Ibn Jumayʿ. A drink made with lemons, dates, and honey was consumed in Mamluk Egypt, as well as a lemon juice drink with sugar known as qatarmizat in the 13th century. An Egyptian recipe for lemonade has been used in England since 1663 and Samuel Pepys consumed it in the 1660s.

A lemonade drink was created in 1630 in Paris following a drop in sugar prices, and became popular in following decades. In 1676, a company known as the Compagnie de Limonadiers sold lemonade in the city. Vendors carried tanks of lemonade on their backs and dispensed cups of the soft drink to Parisians. A recipe for lemonade in John Nott's early 18th century Cooks and confectioners Dictionary included oil of sulphur. Uncarbonated lemonade was a popular drink in the UK in the early 19th century, with Maria Rundell's A New System of Domestic Cookery (1807) including a recipe.

While a method for carbonated water was discovered by Joseph Priestley in 1767 (with his pamphlet Directions for Impregnating Water with Fixed Air published in London in 1772), the first reference found to carbonated lemonade was in 1833 when the drink was sold in British refreshment stalls. One of the first mass produced soft drink brands, R. White's lemonade has been sold in the UK since 1845.

== Uncarbonated lemonade ==
In North America, the Caribbean, and South Asia, lemonade is typically a non-carbonated and non-clarified drink made with lemon juice, water, and sugar. When lemonade contains no added sugars (sugar, honey, HFCS) or carbonation, it is usually called lemon water.

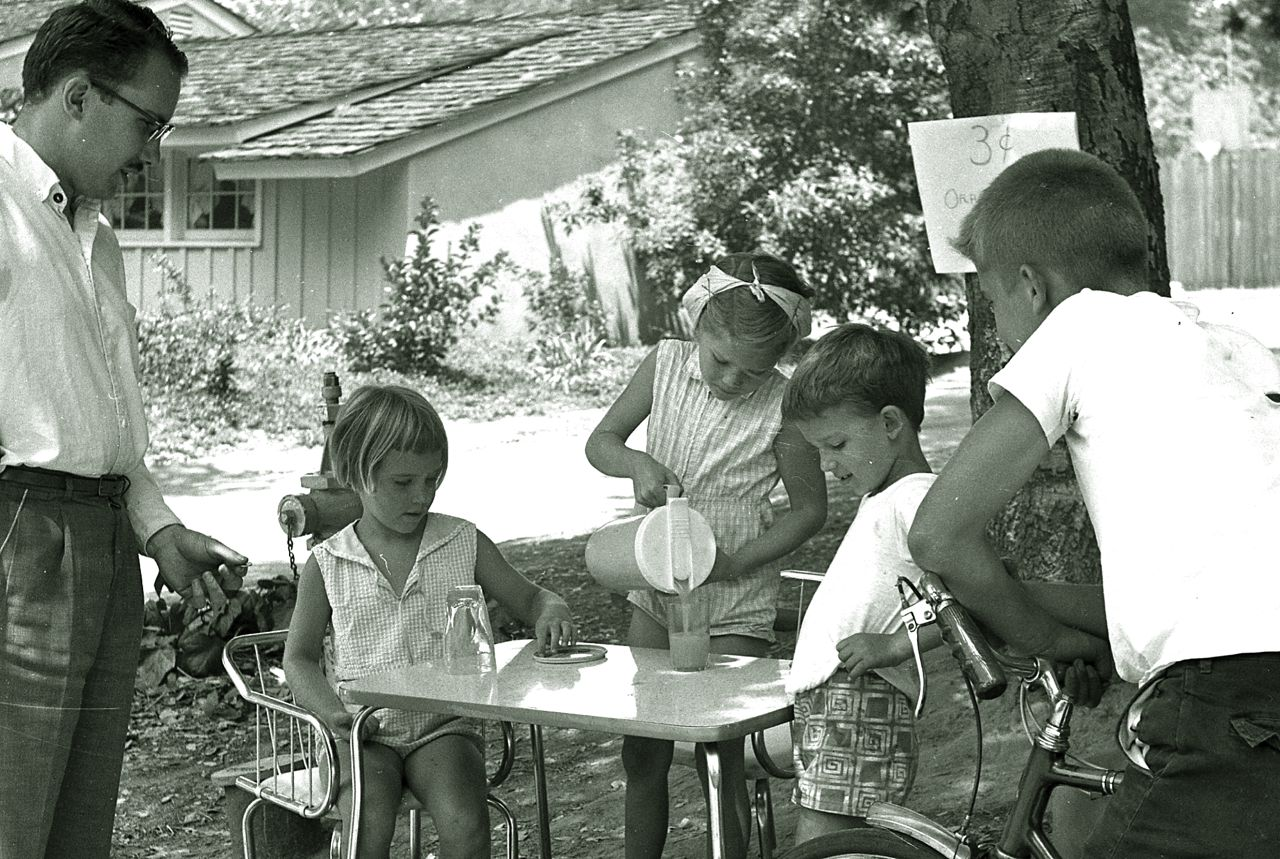
Children operating a lemonade stand in La Cañada Flintridge, California, 1960

Traditionally, children in the US and Canada start lemonade stands to make money during summer. The concept has become iconic of youthful summertime Americana to the degree that parodies and variations exist across media. References can be found in comics and cartoons such as Peanuts, and the 1979 computer game Lemonade Stand.

In countries like the UK where there is both non-carbonated and carbonated lemonade, the non-carbonated drink is sometimes called lemon squash or still, cloudy, traditional or old fashioned lemonade.

Traditional lemonade can also be served frozen or used as a mixer. Still lemonade is sold in the UK under brands like Tesco or Fentimans, which sell a "Victorian lemonade".

=== Lemonade with mint ===
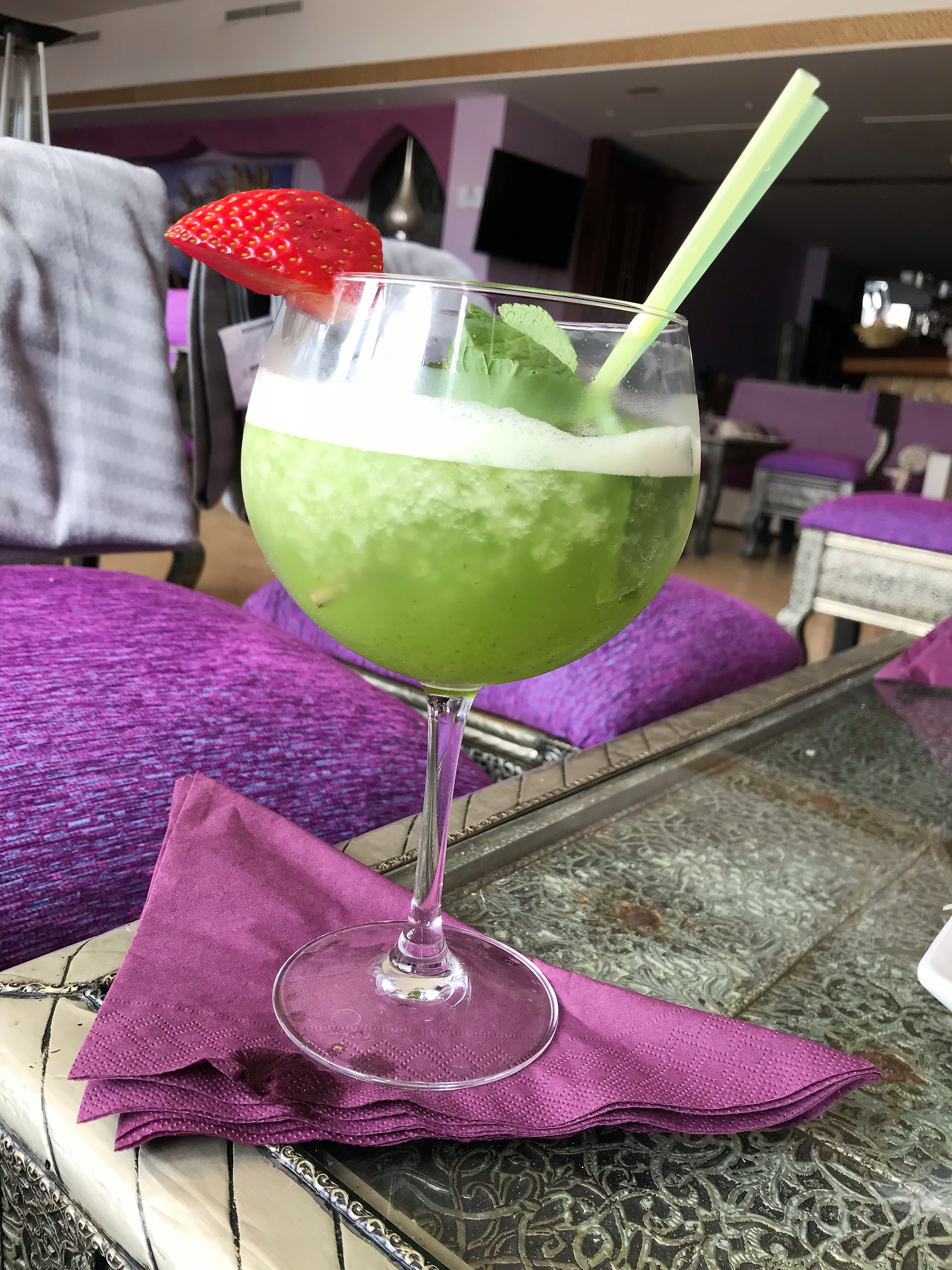
Mint lemonade in Spain

Limonana, or mint lemonade, a type of lemonade made from freshly squeezed lemon juice and mint leaves, is a common summer drink in the Middle East and parts of Europe. In Northern Africa, a drink called cherbet is made of lemon, orange blossom water, and optionally mint.

=== Citron pressé ===
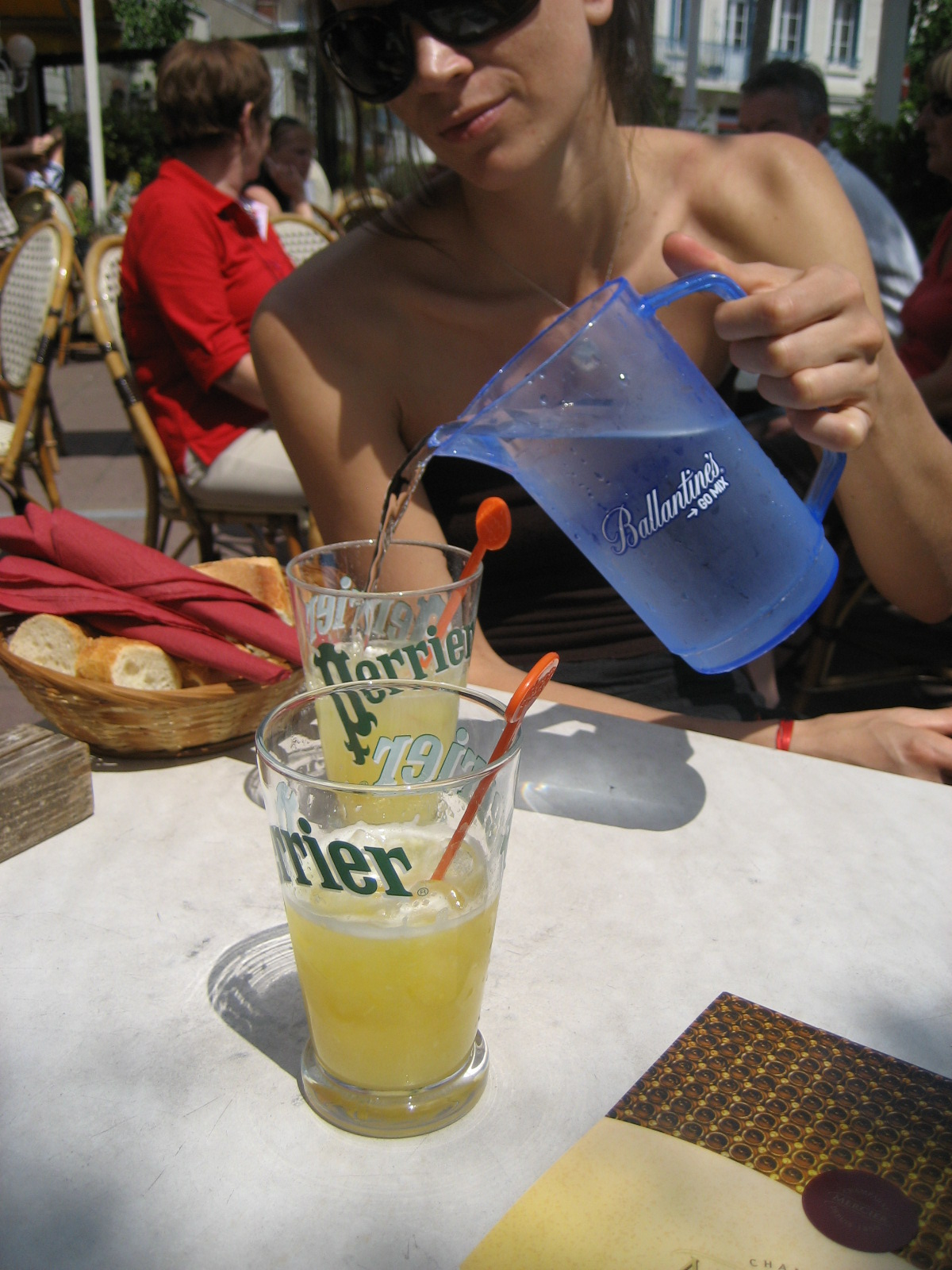
The French soft drink citron pressé, being diluted with water

In France, it is common for bars or restaurants to offer citron pressé, also called citronnade, an unmixed version of lemonade in which the customer is given lemon juice, syrup and water separately to be mixed in their preferred proportions.

=== Pink lemonade ===
A popular variation of traditional lemonade, pink lemonade, is created by adding additional fruit juices, flavors, or food coloring to the recipe. Most store-bought pink lemonade is simply colored with concentrated grape juice or dyes. Among those using natural colors, grape is the most popular, but cranberry juice, beet juice or syrup made from brightly colored fruits and vegetables, such as rhubarb, raspberries, strawberries, or cherries, are also used.

The origin stories generally associate pink lemonade's invention with traveling circuses in the US.

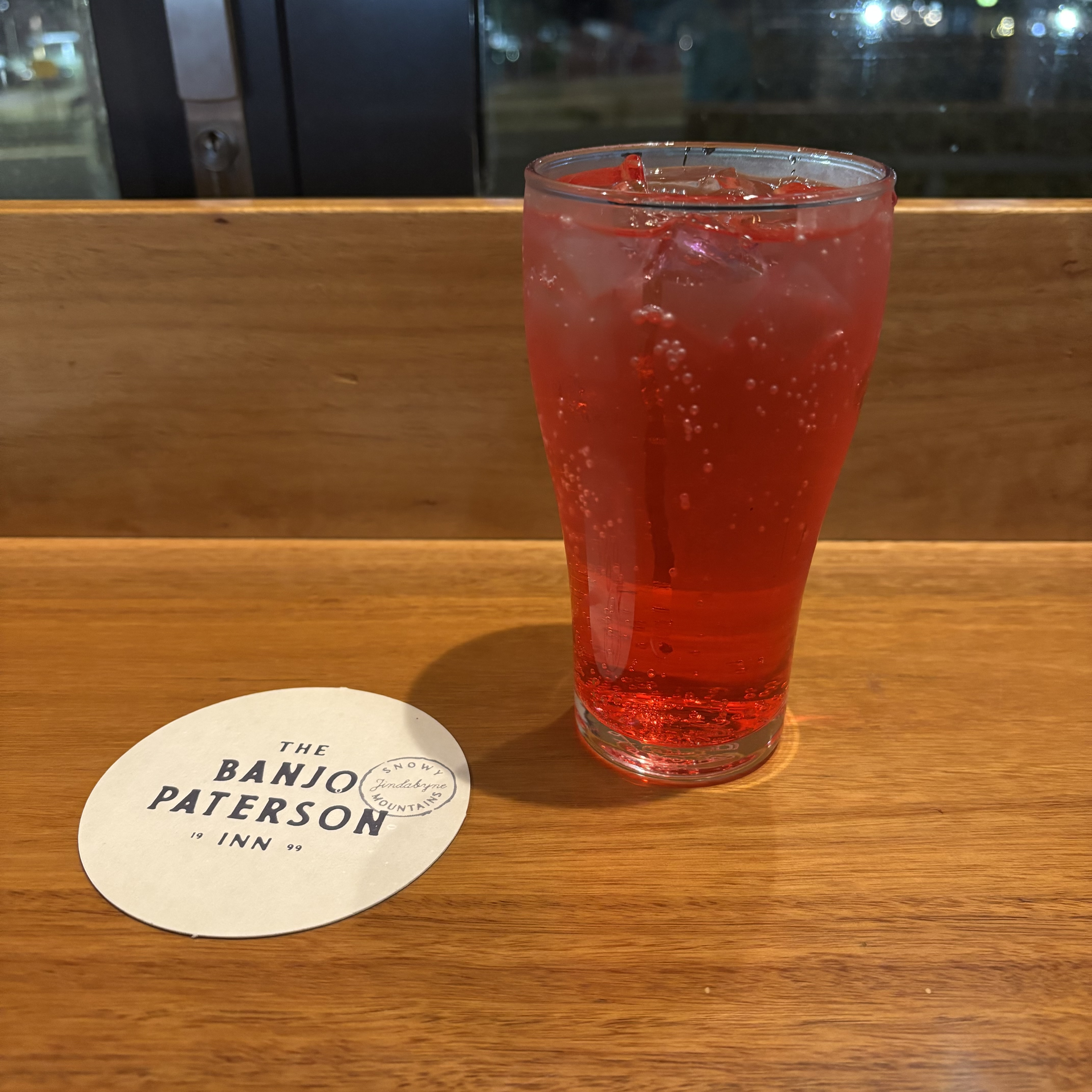
Pink Lemonade at the Banjo Patterson Inn at Jindabyne

A 1912 obituary credited the invention of pink lemonade to circus worker Henry E. "Sanchez" Allott, saying he had dropped in red cinnamon candies by mistake. Another origin story credits another circus worker, Pete Conklin, in 1857. His brother, lion tamer George Conklin, tells the story in his 1921 memoir, The Ways of the Circus. According to the story, Conklin's lemonade was a mixture of water, sugar and tartaric acid, with the tub garnished with a single lemon that he repeatedly used for the season. One day, he ran out of water. Searching desperately, he found a tub of water a bareback rider had recently used to rinse her pink tights. Adding in the sugar, acid and remaining bits of lemon, he offered the resulting mixture as "strawberry lemonade" and saw his sales double.

Real lemons were too expensive for the circus, so artificial substitutes were widely used. In the past, tartaric acid was commonly used to produce the typical tart flavor. In the modern era, commercially produced lemonade and powdered mixes tend to rely on citric acid.

The term "pink lemonade" can also describe Indian lemonade (referring to Native Americans), which is made by soaking dried sumac berries to produce a pink-colored beverage. The species of berries used include Rhus typhina ("staghorn sumac"), Rhus aromatica ("fragrant sumac", "lemon sumac"), Rhus glabra ("smooth sumac", "scarlet sumac"), and Rhus integrifolia ("lemonade sumac", "lemonade berry").

=== Brown lemonade ===
There are various drinks called brown lemonade. A variant from Venezuela has cane sugar and lime. Lemonade in Ireland traditionally comes in three varieties – red, brown and white.

=== Other varieties ===
In India and Pakistan, where it is commonly known as nimbu paani, and in Bangladesh, lemonades may also contain salt or ginger juice called lebur shorbot. Shikanjvi is a traditional lemonade from this region, and can also be flavored with saffron, cumin and other spices.

== Carbonated lemonade ==
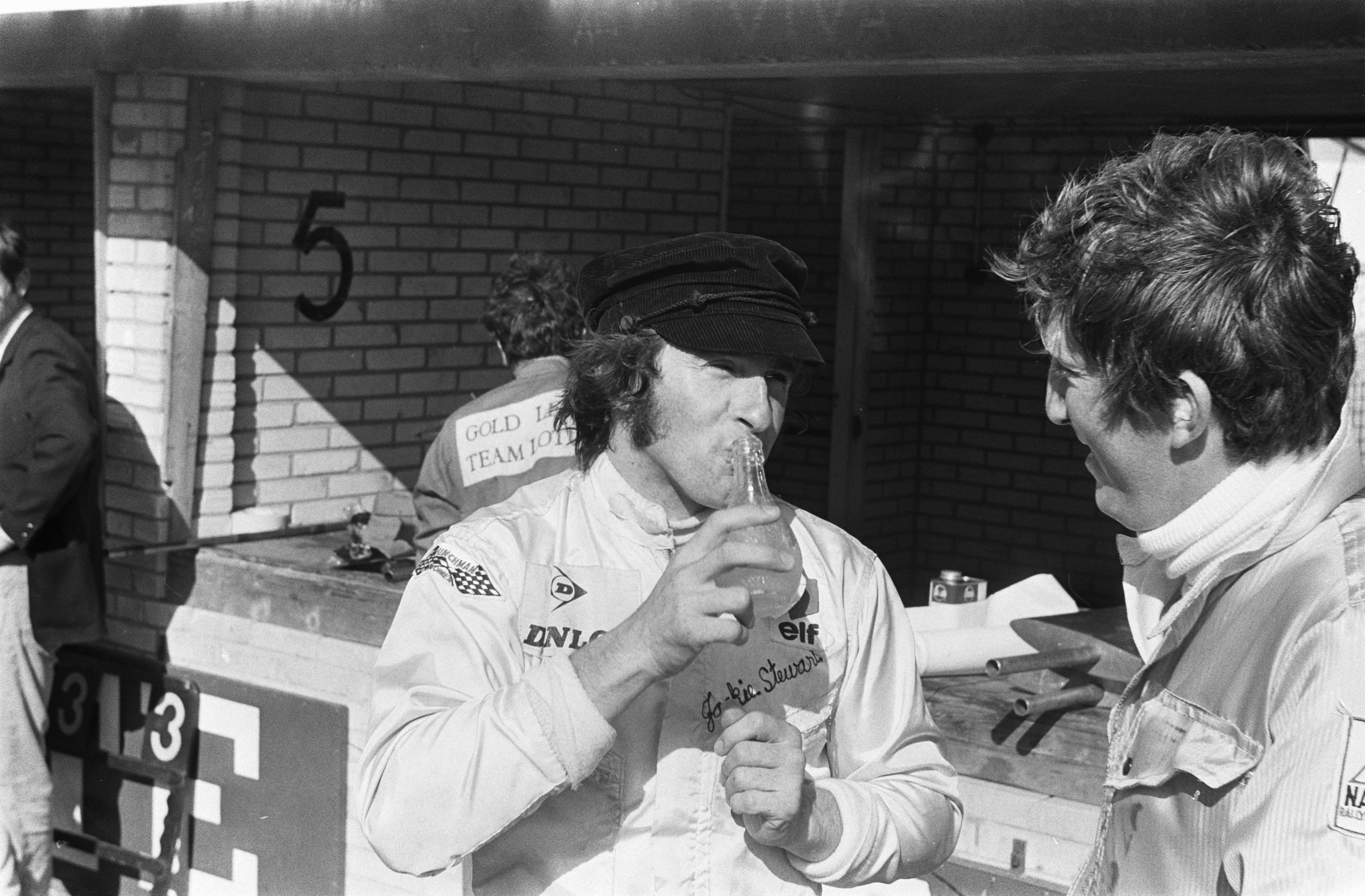
British Formula One motor racing driver Jackie Stewart drinking carbonated lemonade in 1969

The predominant form of lemonade in the UK, Ireland, France, Germany, New Zealand, Switzerland, South Africa, and Australia is a clear, lemon-flavoured carbonated beverage.

Schweppes, Kirks, R. White's Lemonade, L&P and C&C are all common brands, and shops usually carry a store-branded lemonade as well. Schweppes uses a blend of lemon and lime oils. Other lemon-lime flavoured fizzy drinks, such as Sprite and 7 Up, are also commonly referred to as "lemonade" and are sometimes substituted for it in alcoholic drinks.

There are also speciality flavours, such as Fentimans Rose Lemonade, which is sold in the UK, the US, and Canada. Shandy, a mixture of beer and clear lemonade, is often sold pre-bottled, or ordered in pubs.

In Ireland, red lemonade and brown lemonade are popular varieties alongside uncoloured lemonade (referred to as white lemonade), and they are drunk by themselves as well as in mixed alcoholic drinks.

In Ulster in Northern Ireland, brown lemonade is flavoured with brown sugar. In Northern Ireland, it is a traditional accompaniment to a "Saturday night Ulster stew" or an Ulster fry. It originated in Belfast during the city's industrial golden age, for shipyard works in Harland & Wolff and dockers in coal yards, such as John Kelly Limited. This was due to the ban of alcohol consumption during working hours, resulting in the workers drinking brown lemonade.

In Estonia, lemonade was first commercially produced as a carbonated drink in 1860. The two most popular lemonade brands are Kelluke and Limonaad, with Kelluke being made with lemon and lime flavours and Limonaad having a blend of herb extracts.

== Gallery ==
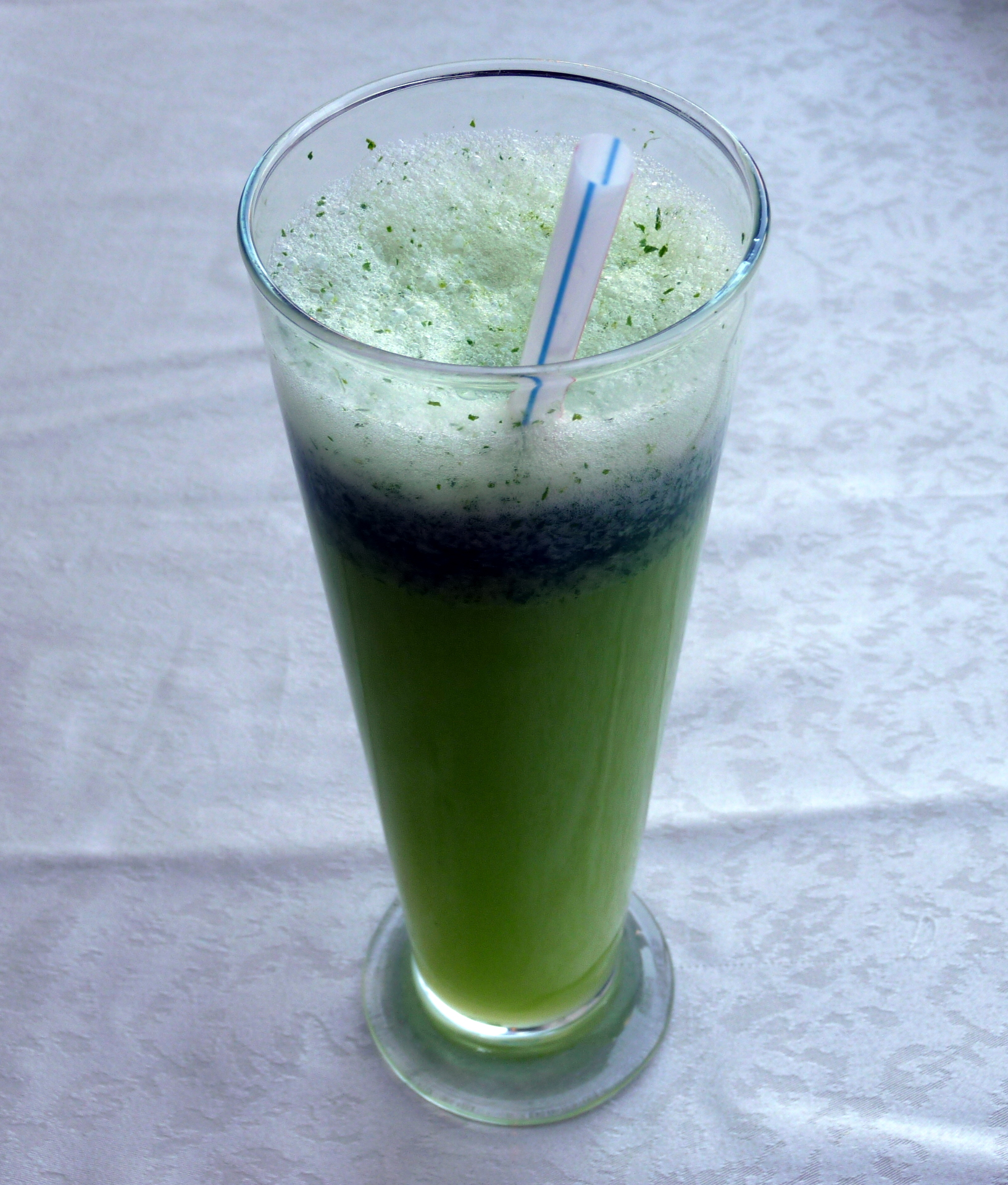
Mint lemonade served in Damascus, Syria

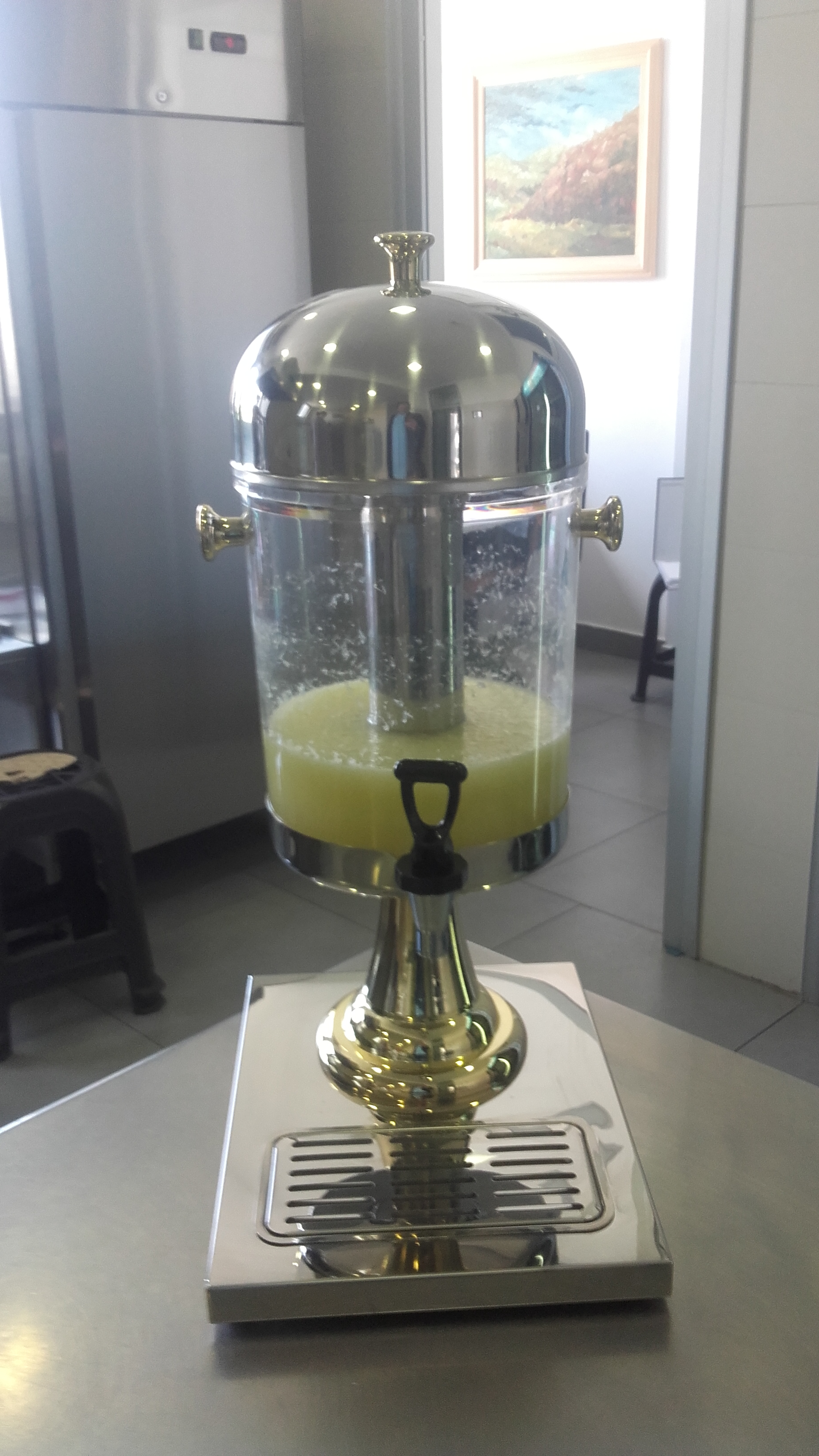
Drink dispenser containing lemonade

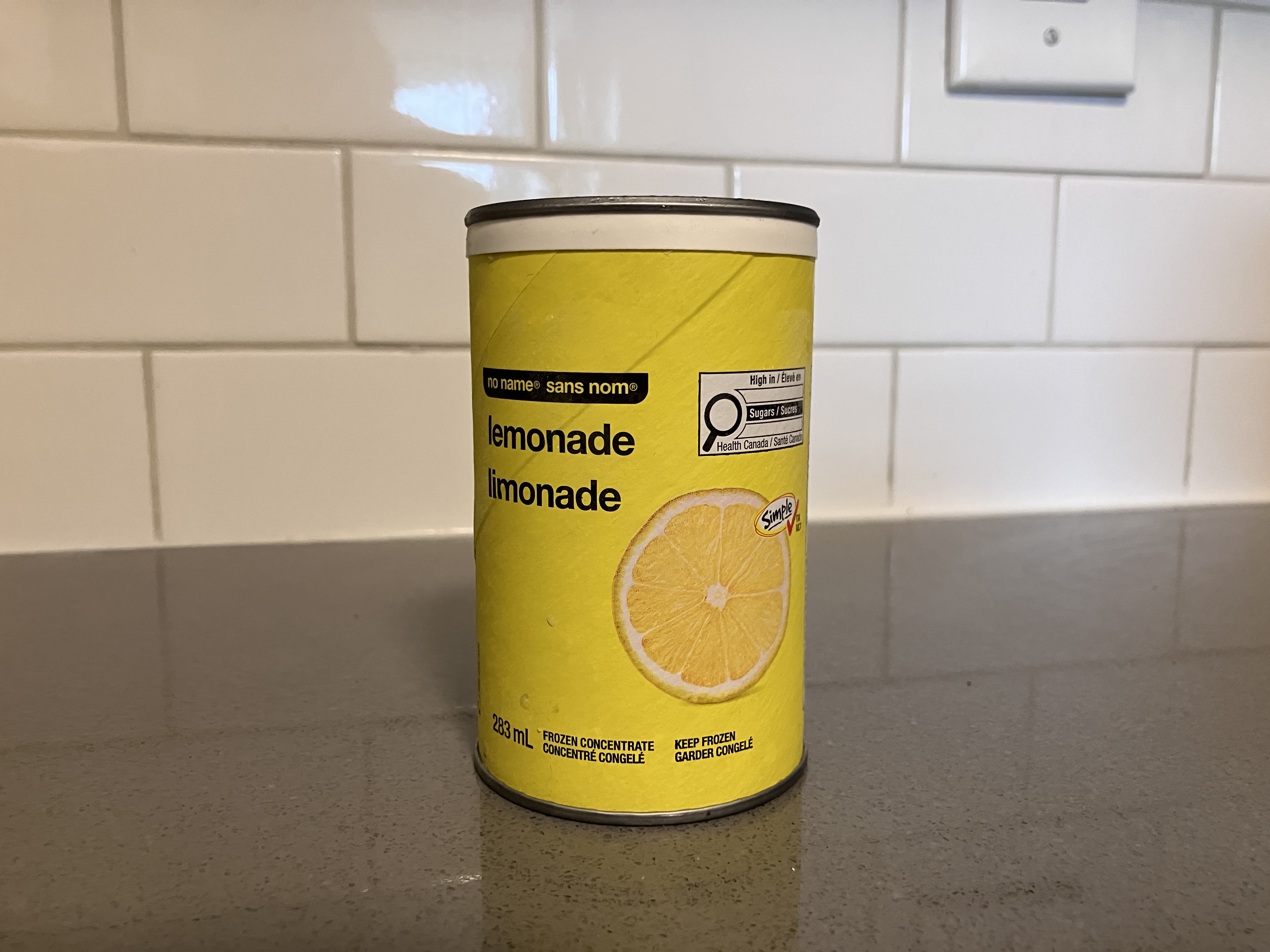
Frozen juice concentrate in Canada

== See also ==
- Chanh muối
- Hard lemonade
- Lemonade cocktail
- List of lemon-lime drink brands
- Lemon, lime and bitters
- List of juices
- List of lemon dishes and drinks
- Ramune
- When life gives you lemons, make lemonade
