= Vinegar pie =

American custard dessert

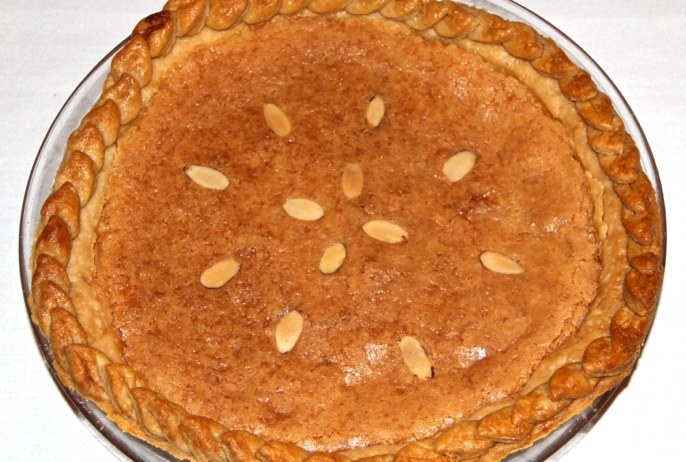
A vinegar pie prepared for a pie-making competition

Vinegar pie is a custard pie particularly associated with the cookery of the Pennsylvania Dutch and Appalachia in the United States' Upper Midwest. They were originally made as an imitation of lemon pies at times when lemons were hard to get. In their most simple form, a vinegar pie contains a combination of butter, eggs, sugar, and vinegar, while more elaborate versions include spices and toppings.

Vinegar pies emerged in the United States in the late 19th century. They were eaten throughout the early 20th century, particularly during periods of economic depression, becoming less common over the course of the century, sometimes due to an association with poverty. They continue to be prepared in some areas, by some bakeries and diners as a trendy food item, and in Appalachia using vinegars fermented from an assortment of fruits.

== Description ==
Vinegar pies are a type of custard pie, in most preparations containing a simple combination of butter, eggs, sugar and vinegar. While early versions identified by the food historian William Woys Weaver contained vinegar with a small amount of lemon zest, later vinegar pies have contained a number of preparations and additional ingredients. Flavourings have included spices—sometimes cinnamon, nutmeg, cloves, or allspice—blended into the filling or sprinkled over the top, and some versions have included toppings such as lattices, meringue or sweetened cream.

== History ==
An early version published in 1882 in Detroit, "about as close to the source of invention as we may come", is identified by Weaver. (Note: Weaver's source for this recipe is Mahlon W. Ellsworth and F. B. Dickerson. The Successful Housekeeper.) This pie modified the lemon meringue pie, a highly regarded food in Pennsylvania and New York that was costly due its large quantities of unsalted butter, eggs, and imported lemons. Vinegar pie removed much of the lemon, leaving only a small amount of zest. In its place, cider vinegar was added, producing a pie similar in appearance but not flavor. This pie was common in boarding houses and hotels, particularly in areas far from ports.

Vinegar pies remained popular for much of the 20th century, and eaten across America. One typical recipe published in 1910 in Washington, on the US's East coast proceeded as follows: "One cup sugar, four tablespoons good vinegar, one tablespoon lemon extract, one cup hot water, four tablespoonfuls flour. Sift flour and sugar together, add vinegar and egg then the hot water, cook and fill a baked crust and frost with the whites." Vinegar pies continued to be produced in the Depression as a desperation pie, including in African-American households, and into the 1960s when the use of apple cider vinegar meant the pie was considered a substitute for apple pie. By the 1980s, vinegar pies were particularly associated with folk festivals in Iowa and Oklahoma. They were made much less frequently than they had been at the start of the century. Sometimes, cooks stopped making vinegar pies out of a sense of pride, worried guests would consider them poor.

Vinegar pies continue to be prepared, and are associated with the cookery of the Pennsylvania Dutch and Appalachia in the United States' Upper Midwest. They are also sometimes identified as a part of Southern cuisine, as a variation on Chess pie. In Appalachian cuisine, vinegars made at home, fermented from a range of fruit are used, producing pies that vary in flavour. In Missouri, recipes for vinegar pies continue to be published in community cookbooks, even as their preparation was rare. Some bakeries and diners in the 21st century have started preparing vinegar pies, as a trendy food.

== In media ==
Vinegar pies have appeared in popular media, such as Nellie McClung's autobiography Clearing in the West (1935). In a section, McClung recounts her mother preparing several vinegar pies for a picnic, spiced with cinnamon and cheaper than the fruit pies she wanted to make. They also appear in the musical Waitress, based on the 2007 film. There, a recipe titled "I Don’t Want Earl’s Baby Vinegar Pie" invokes the accessibility of vinegar pie's ingredients but ultimately says it is something the protagonist does not want, using the vinegar's sour taste as a metaphor for the abuse of her husband.

Jennifer Jason Leigh's character prepares a vinegar pie for Alec Baldwin in Miami Blues, deliberately adding too much vinegar to test whether he will lie and pretend to enjoy it. He does.

== See also ==
- List of pies, tarts and flans
- Pie in American cuisine
- Pies in Pennsylvania

== Sources ==
- Elias, Megan (2014). Lunch: A History. Lanham, Maryland: Rowman & Littlefield. ISBN 978-1-4422-2746-0.
- Fehribach, Paul (2023). Midwestern Food: A Chef's Guide to the Surprising History of a Great American Cuisine, with More Than 100 Tasty Recipes. University of Chicago Press. ISBN 978-0-226-81949-5.
- Fisher, Carol; Fisher, John (2008). Pot Roast, Politics, and Ants in the Pantry: Missouri's Cookbook Heritage. Columbia, Missouri & London: University of Missouri Press. ISBN 978-0-8262-1791-2.
- Kellar, Allisson (2021). "Waitress: Creating and Consuming Inspiration". In Harde, Roxanne; Wesselius, Janet (eds.). Consumption and the Literary Cookbook. New York & Abingdon, Oxon: Routledge. ISBN 978-1-003-11951-7.
- Lundy, Ronni (2019). "Afterword". In Engelhard, Elizabeth S D; Smith, Lora E (eds.). The Food We Eat, the Stories We Tell: Contemporary Appalachian Tables. Athens, Ohio: Ohio University Press. ISBN 9780821423912.
- McWilliams, Jacqueline B (1996). The Way We Ate: Pacific Northwest Cooking, 1843-1900. Pullman, Washington: Washington State University Press. ISBN 0-87422-137-4.
- Opie, Frederick Douglass (2008). Hog and Hominy: Soul Food from Africa to America. New York: Columbia University Press. ISBN 978-0-231-14638-8.
- Puckett, Susan (1988). A Cook's Tour of Iowa. Iowa City: University of Iowa Press. ISBN 0-87745-191-5.
- Sharpless, Rebecca (2022). Grain and Fire: A History of Baking in the American South. Chapel Hill, North Carolina: The University of North Carolina Press. ISBN 978-1-4696-6836-9.
- Weaver, William Woys (1989). America Eats: Forms of Edible Folk Art. New York: Harper & Row. ISBN 0-06-0551771.
