= Possum pie =

Type of American pie

Possum pie is an iconic American pie that is rarely seen outside Arkansas. The pie is made with several layers, with the most common being layers of vanilla pudding, cream cheese, chocolate custard and/or sour cream. There are many different combinations making use of alternating layers of cream cheese and puddings topped with whipped cream. The pecan shortbread crust is different from other icebox pies.

Possum pie earned its name because the pie "plays possum" by hiding all the layers of its ingredients under a thick whipped cream topping. The dessert does not actually contain possum meat.

== History ==
The first mention of possum pie in the Arkansas Gazette dates to a 1983 restaurant review. The recipe itself doesn't begin to appear in food sections until the late 2000s. An earlier recipe for a layered nut-crumb crust pudding and cream cheese pie with whipped topping was submitted to the Arkansas Dairy Recipe Contest, a student content open to fourth-12th graders. Similar recipes for a pie called "The Next Best Thing to Robert Redford" were being published by the Indianapolis Star and Los Angeles Times by 1982. Historically the term was mostly used in minstrel songs.
