= Cream pie (disambiguation) =

A cream pie is a type of pie filled with a rich custard or pudding.

Cream pie may also refer to:

== Foods ==
- Banana cream pie
- Boston cream pie, a cake with a cream filling
- Sugar cream pie, also known as a sugar pie

== Other ==
- Creampie (sexual act)
