= Dried apple pie =

Pie made with dried apples

Dried apple pie is a type of apple pie made from reconstituted, dried apples. They have featured in American cookery since at least the 18th century. Dried apple pies are particularly prominent in the cuisine of the Pennsylvania Dutch, where they are known as schnitz pie.

== History ==
Dried apple pies have been prepared in America since at least the 18th century. In his 1782 text Letters from an American Farmer, the French-American farmer Michel-Guillaume Crèvecoeur described making pies in all seasons with slices of apples that he had dried on poles and wooden boards. Simmons includes a recipe in American Cookery (1796) which she published in Albany, New York as the first cookbook published by an American author. It was one of three recipes for apple pies, but unlike those which replicated English preparations, Simmons's dried apple pie included a "handful of cramberries", alongside more typical English additions such as raisins, limes, orange peel and cinnamon.

Dried apples pie was often eaten by travelers in the American west during the mid-19th century, as a portable treat and a means of preventing scurvy, with one commentator expressing that there was "apple pie from Genesis to Revelation along the Platte." While some were appreciative of the food, others came to dislike it after having it so often. Critics described a "sole-leather lard-soaked lower crust, half-baked, with a thin veneer of dried apples daubed with brown sugar," some expressing their disdain in poetry:

I loathe, abhor, detest, despise
Abominate dried apple pies.
Tread on my corns and tell me lies
But don’t pass me dried apple pies.

One recipe for dried apple pie is provided by Jane Cunningham Croly in 1870. Croly's recipe required washing and soaking slices of dried, tart apples, before boiling them with slices of lemon until tender and then continuing to boil them with sugar. Croly's dried apple pies were finished by adding butter, cinnamon, and clove powder.

== Pennsylvania Dutch ==
Among the Pennsylvania Dutch, dried apple pies are known as schnitz or snitz pie (schnitz boi in the Pennsylvania Dutch language; schnitz meaning slice). Schnitz is most often used as a name for dried apples, which are produced locally in the summer and fall. Making them involves peeling and cutting apples into quarters or eighths, that are dried and stored in bags. These are sold in Pennsylvania at Amish shops and health food stores. In the past in Pennsylvania, days when apples were harvested and processed had a festive atmosphere, and were known under the name schnitzing parties. By the 1960s, schnitz pies were among the most typical pie preparations among the Pennsylvania Dutch, a group that was eating pies at multiple meals a day; they remain among the most popular pies in the cuisine into the 21st century.

These are made by boiling dried apple slices, adding spices and sugar, then enclosing the mixture in a round or half moon pie crust and baking. They are particularly associated with Lancaster County in Pennsylvania's south east. One version that was often made at the Kutztown Folk Festival involved boiling then pureering dried apple slices, after which they were cooked down with brown sugar, sometimes topping the pie with meringue. The food writer William Woys Weaver describes these as often saccharine, with little flavor. Other versions tasted less sweet. One of these known as Ebbelschnitz Boi mit Siesser Grumbiere used sweet potatoes as the source of sweetness instead of sugar. It originated in Littlestown, a borough in Adams County.

The pie cookery of the Pennsylvania Dutch typically follows the seasonal changes in produce availabilities, with dried fruit most often used as a filling when fresh alternatives are unavailable. This has led to an association between dried fruits, particularly dark ones such as raisins, and funerals. Just as dried fruit pies can be made at any time of the year, so may death appear. Due to this association, baking dried apple pies when seasonal fruit is plentiful may be seen as a breach of cooking norms.

== See also ==
- List of apple dishes
- List of pies, tarts and flans
- Pie in American cuisine
- Pies in Pennsylvania
- Schnitz un knepp

== Sources ==
- Adams, Marcia (1989). Cooking from Quilt Country: Hearty Recipes from Amish and Mennonite Kitchens. New York: Clarkson N. Potter. ISBN 0-517-57361-X.
- Fieldhouse, Paul (2017). Food, Feasts, and Faith: An Encyclopedia of Food Culture in World Religions. Vol. 1. Santa Barbara, California: ABC-CLIO. ISBN 9781440846151.
- Heffner, Sarah Wolfgang (2003). "Apple". In Katz, Solomon H (ed.). Encyclopedia of Food and Culture. Scribner Library of Daily Life. Vol. 1. New York: Charles Scribner’s Sons. ISBN 0-684-80565-0.
- Heller, Edna Eby (1968). The Art of Pennsylvania Dutch Cooking. Garden City, New York: Doubleday & Company.
- Hooker, Richard J (1981). Food and Drink in America: A History. Indianapolis, Indiana and New York: The Bobbs-Merrill Company, Inc. ISBN 0-672-52681-6.
- Milspaw, Yvonne J (2017). "Food and Cooking". In Bronner, Simon J; Brown, Joshua R (eds.). Pennsylvanía Germans: An Interpretive Encyclopedia. Baltimore, Maryland: Johns Hopkins University Press. ISBN 9781421421384.
- Root, Waverley; de Rochemont, Richard (1976). Eating in America: A History. New York: William Morrow and Company, Inc. ISBN 0-688-03096-3.
- Stavely, Keith; Fitzgerald, Kathleen (2004). America's Founding Food: The Story of New England Cooking. Chapel Hill, North Carolina & London: The University of North Carolina Press. ISBN 0-8078-2894-7.
- Weaver, William Woys (2013). As American as Shoofly Pie. Philadelphia, Pennsylvania: University of Pennsylvania Press. ISBN 978-0-8122-2386-6.
- Weaver, William Woys (2015). "Pennsylvania Dutch". In Goldstein, Darra (ed.). The Oxford Companion to Sugar and Sweets. Oxford: Oxford University Press. ISBN 978-0-199-31339-6.
- Weaver, William Woys (2016). Dutch Treats: Heirloom Recipes from Farmhouse Kitchens. Pittsburgh, Pennsylvania: St. Lynn’s Press. ISBN 978-1-943366-04-0.
- Williams, Susan (2006). Food in the United States, 1820s-1890. Westport, Connecticut: Greenwood Press. ISBN 0-313-33245-2.
