= Schnitz un knepp =

US dish of pork, apples and dumplings

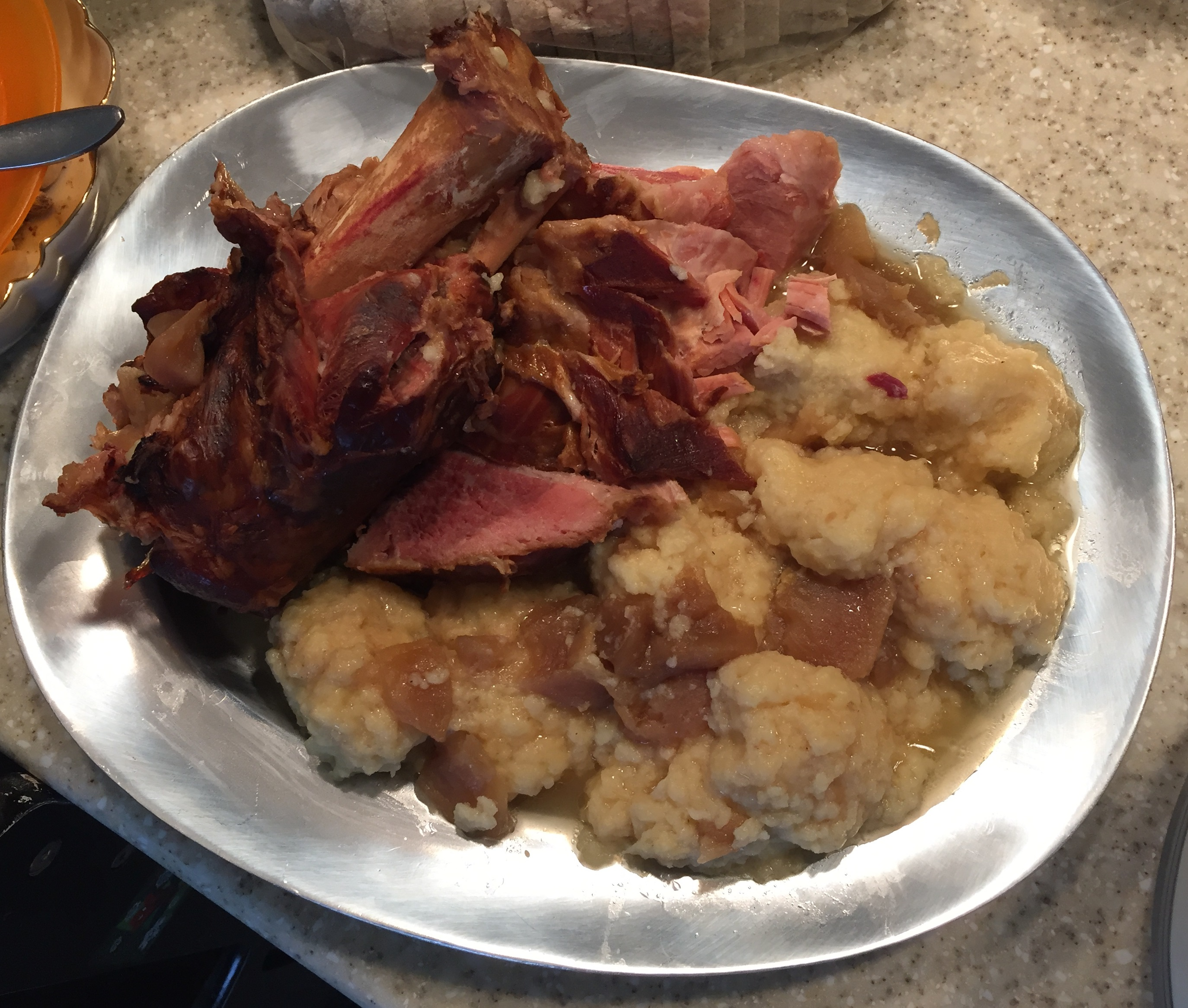
- Place of origin: United States
- Region or state: Pennsylvania
- Main ingredients: Ham or pork shoulder, dried apples, flour, sugar, milk, more

Schnitz un knepp, often spelled Schnitz un Gnepp or Schnitz und Knepp, is a popular main dish item in the cuisine of the Pennsylvania Dutch in the United States. It is basically a dish of ham or pork shoulder with dried apples and dumplings.

== Description ==
Apple schnitz are dried slices of apples. Knepp, from the German "Knöpfe" for "buttons," are dumplings.

Although the Amish arrived during the early eighteenth century, this food was not common until the early nineteenth century, when Johnny Appleseed planted many orchards on the frontier of Pennsylvania, Ohio, and Indiana. At the time, home canning was not yet practical, so the apple crop was preserved in liquid form (most commonly as hard cider) or sliced and dried, the finished slices being called snitz.

Apples, other than named varieties grafted from a parent tree, were usually small, misshapen and rather tart. Drying the snitz concentrated the fruit sugars, making them a bright spot in an otherwise dreary diet.

Today, commercial producers of apple snitz use named-variety apples that cannot be sold fresh due to blemishes. The apples are then peeled or cored and sliced to make snitz. The peels are then pressed for separate sales as cider.

The dish uses dumplings made from flour, milk, baking powder, butter, salt, and eggs, and is flavored with ham, traditionally salt-cured "country ham," although honey ham, pork butt, or other pork may be used. Onions, potatoes, cloves, cinnamon and brown sugar are optional ingredients. An alternative knepp is a yeast dumpling made without sugar.

This recipe calls for long cooking, and is thus a winter dish. The pronunciation is "shnitz-en-nep," /ʃnɪts ʊn nɛp/

== See also ==
- List of ham dishes
- Dried apple pie
