= Angel pie =

Pie with meringue shell

Angel pie is a class of pies in American cuisine made with a meringue pie shell. There are many different fillings that can be used to make angel pie.

== Preparation ==
Angel pie is made with a meringue shell. Cream of tartar is used to add stability and volume to the egg whites. The meringue can be sprinkled with chopped nuts before baking. It is cooked in the oven at a low temperature for several hours. This method dries the crust without browning.

== Types ==
According to James Beard, angel pies were one of the most frequently published pie recipes in the early to mid-20th century.

There are many fillings that can be used for an angel pie. Chocolate mousse filling is made by melting chocolate in a double boiler and gently folding it into whipped cream. Other ingredients like espresso powder and Kahlua can be added to the chocolate.

Lemon angel pie is made with lemon curd filling topped with whipped cream. Fresh strawberries or raspberries are optional. A coconut cream filling can be made with shredded coconut. Grape angel pie can be made with a simple filling of homemade grape gelatin made with grape juice. Pineapple filling for angel pie is made by folding beaten egg whites, whipped cream, glacé cherries and crushed pineapple into gelatin.

The Pavlova is a type of angel pie made with fresh mixed berries and whipped cream.
