= Icebox pie =

Family of no-bake pies popular in the USA

Icebox pies are no-bake pies including ice cream pies, chiffon pies, and classic cream pies like key lime pie, lemon ice box pie, chocolate pudding pie, grasshopper pie and banana cream pie. The crust can be a crumb crust or blind baked pastry. They are associated with the cuisine of the Southern United States.

== Ingredients ==
Common ingredients used in the filling include whipped cream, condensed milk, or pudding. The cookie based crusts are often made with crushed graham crackers or vanilla wafers, though other types of cookies like shortbread and gingersnaps can be used. Variations can be made with the addition of ingredients like peanut butter, malted milk, dulce de leche and sliced bananas. Icebox pies are very often topped with whipped cream.

Some ice box pie fillings are made with gelatin; a 1937 recipe for strawberry icebox pie starts by whisking fruit flavored gelatin to an egg white consistency and combining with fresh fruit. Poured over a vanilla wafer crust to set, the pie is topped with fresh whipped cream. The same basic recipe can be modified using other fruits like peaches or raspberries. Custard pies are made similarly, replacing the gelatin with a simple homemade custard filling, topped with fresh or canned fruits (especially cherries).

== History ==
Icebox pies were originally kept cool in an icebox, used to store perishables when most farming households in the United States had neither electricity nor refrigeration. Because they required no baking they were popular during the summer when it was too hot to bake.

== See also ==
- Pie in American cuisine
- Icebox cake
- Icebox cookie
- Ice cream cake
