= Buttermilk pie =

Type of desperation pie

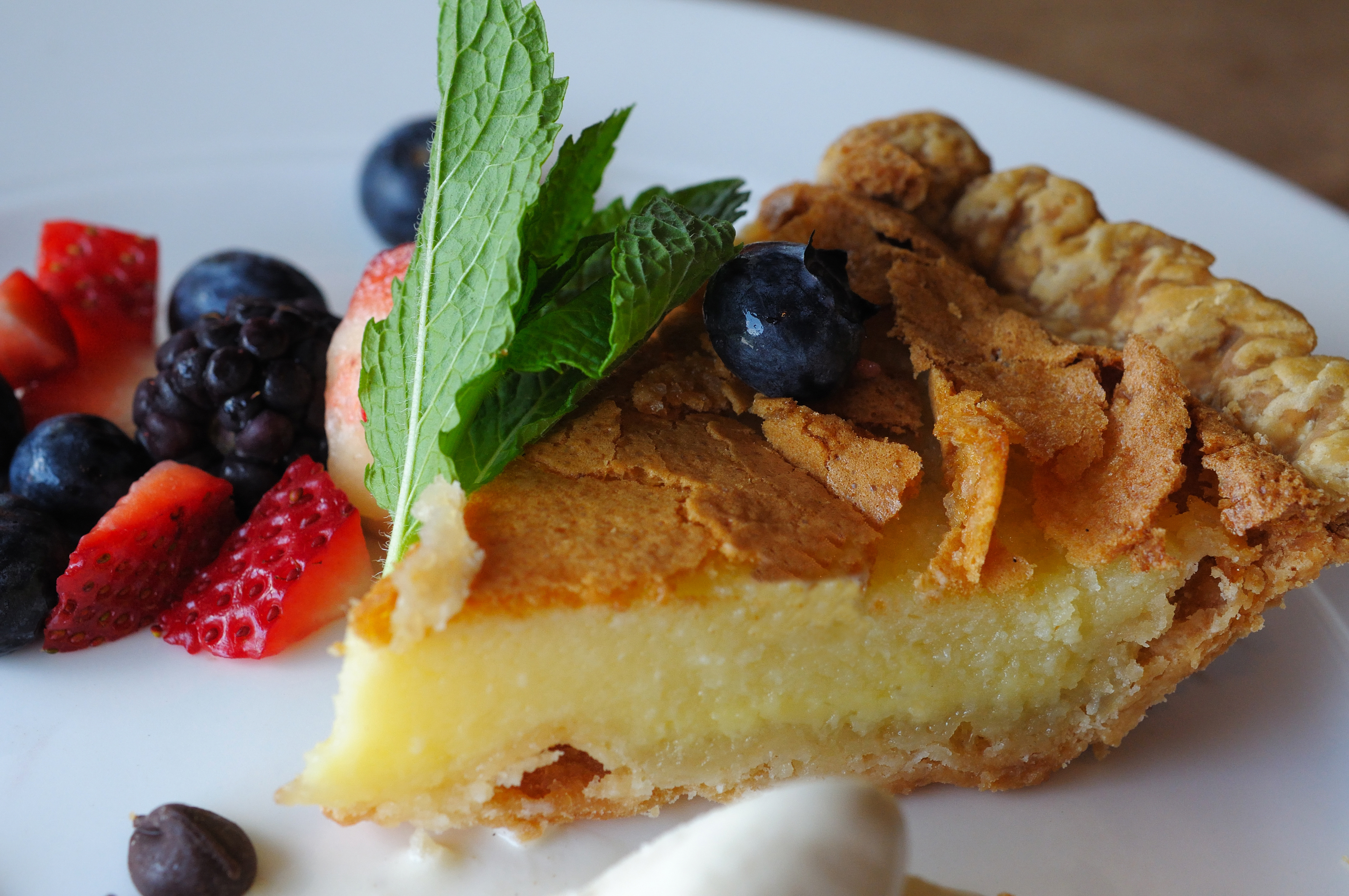
- Buttermilk pie
- Place of origin: United States of America
- Region or state: Southern United States
- Main ingredients: Buttermilk, wheat flour, butter, eggs, sugar
- Food energy (per serving): 547 kcal (2,290 kJ)

Buttermilk pie is a pie in American cuisine. Associated with the cuisine of the Southern United States, it may be considered a desperation pie, made using simple, staple ingredients.

It is similar to, and sometimes confused with, chess pie, but it does not include cornmeal. The basic filling consists of a mixture of sugar, butter, eggs, buttermilk, and wheat flour. Variations on the recipe include vanilla, lemon zest, nutmeg, and coconut. Buttermilk pies are made with a pie crust. The filling is poured into the crust and baked until the mixture sets. The pie is best eaten at room temperature after being allowed to cool, but may be eaten either warm from the oven or after being chilled.

== See also ==
- Custard pie
- List of butter dishes
- List of pies, tarts and flans
