= Pies in Pennsylvania =

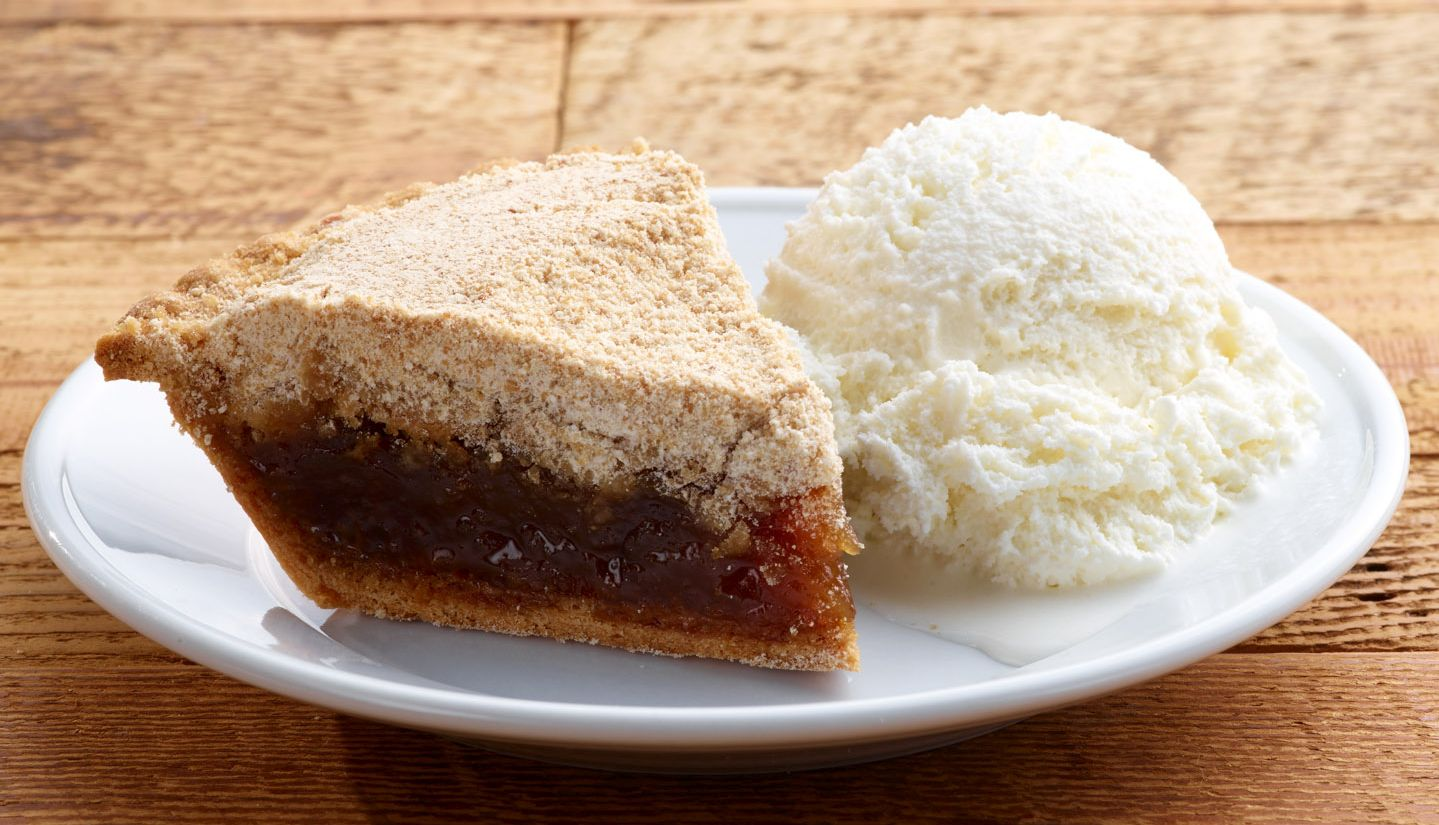
Shoofly pie and ice cream

Pies are particularly prominent in Pennsylvania, a state in the North East of the United States.

== History ==
Pies have been made in Pennsylvania since 1750, when they were introduced by British settlers. As time passed, the area's Pennsylvania German population began producing pies themselves, in increasingly large quantities. By 1756, the Reverend Israel Acrelius could observe the Pennsylvania population producing pies from cherries, apples, and peaches. Scholars generally agree that pies were a novel dish to the German settlers, even as similar dishes were familiar in their homeland, including obstkuchen—large, flat, yeast cakes topped with baked seasonal fruits— Wähe, and pizza. The food historian William Woys Weaver offers a dissenting view, suggesting that people in Germany at this time were likely already familiar with pies.

With their proximity to pies, a new term entered the Pennsylvania Dutch language for the dish, boi. This was derived from the English word pie, and was used to form new words such as schnitzboi ('dried apple pie') and boigraut (literally 'pie plant', meaning rhubarb). Sources agree that this likely adapted a common dialectal pronunciation of pie, although they disagree whether that dialect was from the Yorkshire, Leicestershire, and Midlands settlers, or from the English-Irish.

In the cooking of the Pennsylvania Dutch, ingredients varied by the season, with fruit pies particularly prominent. In spring, this meant pies made from rhubarb and sorrel. Over the following months into mid-fall, pies were made from currants and varieties of cherries, and berries such as strawberries, gooseberries, blackberries, elderberries and raspberries. As fall ended, cooks often used pumpkin and mince meat, flavoring their dishes with rum, and in winter, pies were made from fruits preserved from the summer harvest. In all seasons, cheese and custard pies featured in the Pennsylvania Dutch diet. With the exceptions of raisins and lemons, all fruit was sourced from growers in the local area.

Pies were not the only baked good made among the Pennsylvania Dutch. Kuchen, large, flat yeast cakes studded with fruits or vegetables, continued to be made by the Pennsylvania German population through the 18th and 19th centuries. As the 19th century ended and the 20th century began, kuchen were increasingly considered unappealingly old-fashioned and were made less and less often. The term remained in use within the Pennsylvania Dutch dialect as an occasional descriptor for pies, such as in the cases of ebbelkuche ('apple pie') and Melassich-Riwwelkuche ('molasses crumb pie', commonly known in English as shoofly pie). At times, this could produce confusion among English speakers, as Pennsylvania Dutch speakers, accustomed to referring to pies as kuche, describe apple pies as apple cakes, and pumpkin pies as pumpkin cakes.

Despite their prominence in diets, pies appeared relatively little in the cookbooks of the Pennsylvania Germans at the turn of the 20th century. Those that appeared most frequently were montgomery pie and shoofly pie, both crumb pies. This may have been due to the precision their recipes needed in cooking and measurements which was not required of other recipes, and the possibility that cooks generally used a standard pie crust that they could use as a base for whatever ingredients they had on hand.

By the mid-20th century, several Pennsylvania authors described the eastern areas of Pennsylvania as the "piebelt of America", with one arguing "in this area more and better pies are eaten in greater variety than anywhere else on this terrestrial globe". Some pies made historically in the area were no longer made, with the sorrel pie being described as "extinct". Among those made by the Pennsylvania Dutch, shoofly pie was the most famous.

== See also ==
- Pies in American cuisine

== Sources ==
- Barba, Preston A (February 24, 1951). "Pie and the Pennsylvania Germans". The Morning Call. Allentown, Pennsylvania.
- Heller, Edna Eby (Spring 1958). "Pies in Dutchland". Pennsylvania Folklife. 9 (2).
- Heller, Edna Eby (1968). The Art of Pennsylvania Dutch Cooking. Garden City, New York: Doubleday & Company.
- Milspaw, Yvonne J (2017). "Food and Cooking". In Bronner, Simon J; Brown, Joshua R (eds.). Pennsylvanía Germans: An Interpretive Encyclopedia. Baltimore, Maryland: Johns Hopkins University Press. ISBN 9781421421384.
- Weaver, William Woys (1993). Pennsylvania Dutch Country Cooking. New York: Abbeville Press. ISBN 1-55859-568-6.
- Yoder, Don (1990). Discovering American Folklife: Studies in Ethnic, Religious, and Regional Culture. Ann Arbor, Michigan: UMI Research Press. ISBN 0-8357-1973-1.
