= Banoffee pie =

English dessert pie

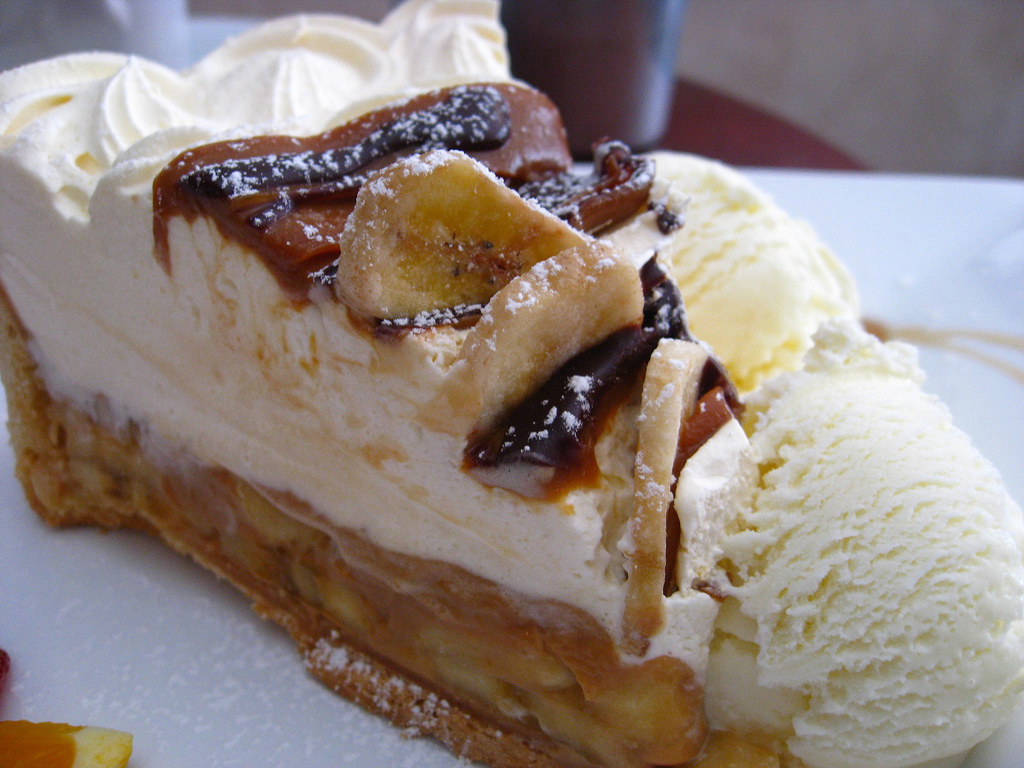
- A slice of banoffee pie served with ice cream
- Type: Pie
- Place of origin: Jevington, East Sussex, England
- Created by: Nigel Mackenzie and Ian Dowding
- Main ingredients: Pastry base or crumbled biscuits, butter, bananas, cream, toffee

Banoffee pie or banoffi pie is an English dessert pie made from bananas, whipped cream, and a thick caramel sauce (made from boiled condensed milk or milk jam), combined either on a pastry base or one made from crumbled biscuits and butter. Some versions include chocolate, coffee, or both. The name is a portmanteau combining the words banana and toffee.

== History ==
Credit for the pie's invention is claimed by Nigel Mackenzie and Ian Dowding, the owner and chef respectively of the former Hungry Monk Restaurant in Jevington, East Sussex, England. They said they created the dessert in 1971, basing it on a San Francisco recipe for "Blum's Coffee Toffee Pie", which used milk jam, a soft toffee made by boiling an unopened can of condensed milk for several hours. Mackenzie and Dowding found they were unable to perfect the recipe consistently, and after trying various changes including the addition of apple or mandarin orange, Mackenzie suggested banana and Dowding later said that "straight away we knew we had got it right". Mackenzie suggested the name "banoffi pie", and the dish proved so popular with their customers that they "couldn't take it off" the menu.

The recipe was published in The Deeper Secrets of The Hungry Monk in 1974, and reprinted in the 1997 cookbook In Heaven with The Hungry Monk. Similar recipes were adopted by other restaurants throughout the world. In 1984, several supermarkets began selling it as an American pie, leading Mackenzie to offer a £10,000 prize to anyone who could disprove their claim to be the English inventors. Dowding stated that his "pet hates are biscuit crumb bases and that horrible cream in aerosols". It was Margaret Thatcher's favourite food to cook. The word banoffee entered the English language, used to describe any food or product that tastes or smells of both banana and toffee.

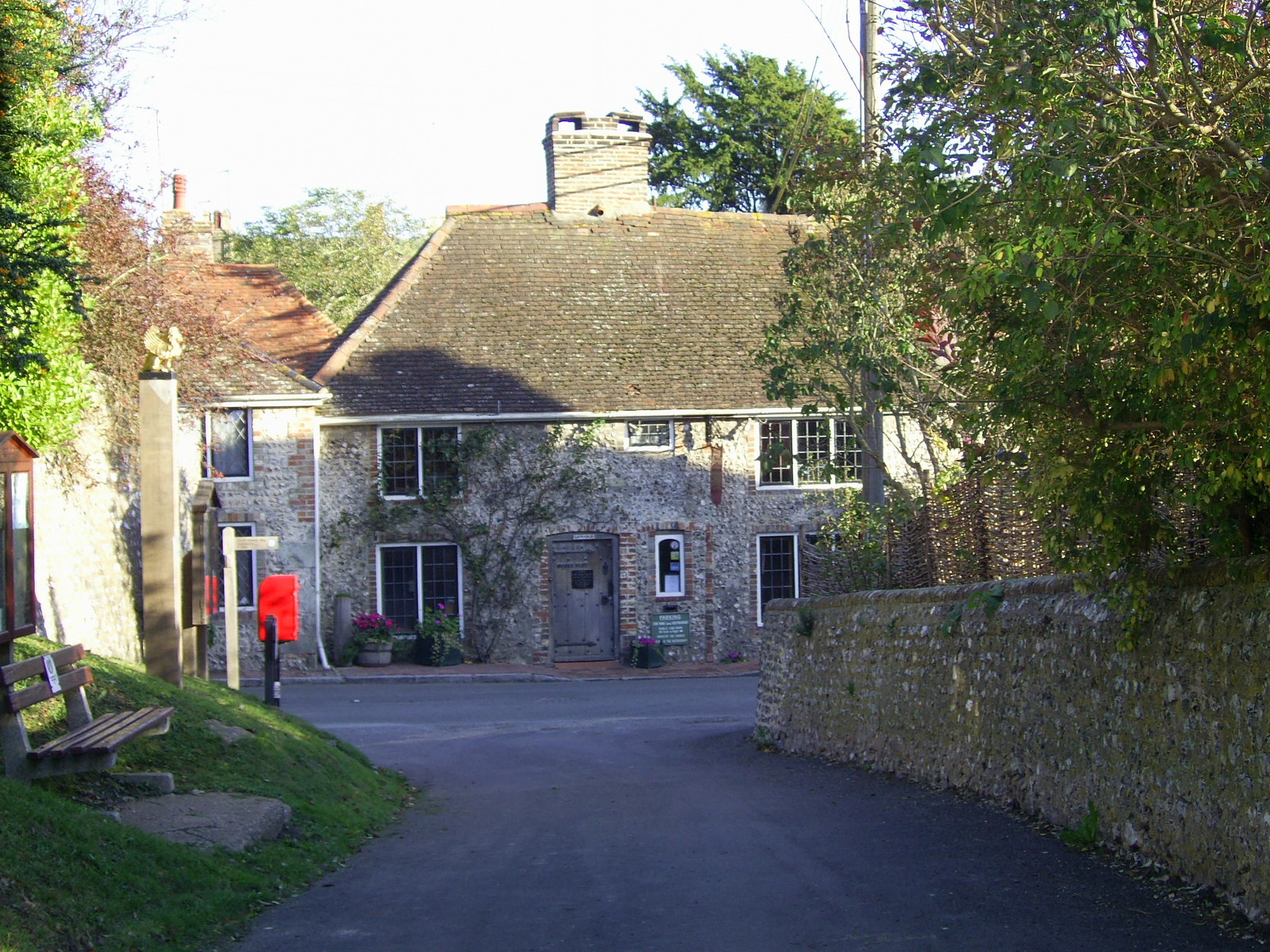
The Hungry Monk Restaurant, Jevington, East Sussex, whose staff Nigel Mackenzie and Ian Dowding introduced banoffee pie

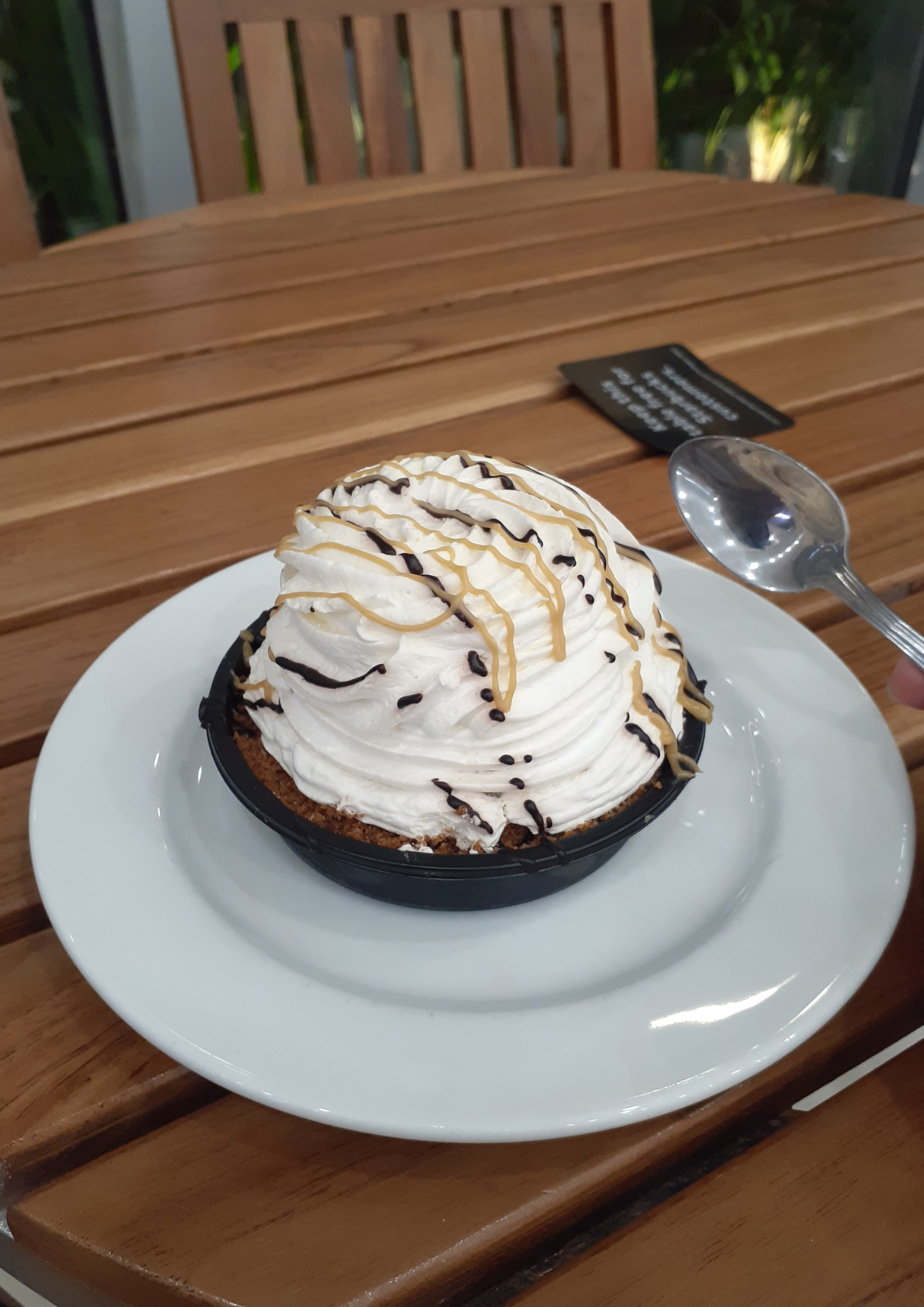
A served banoffee pie

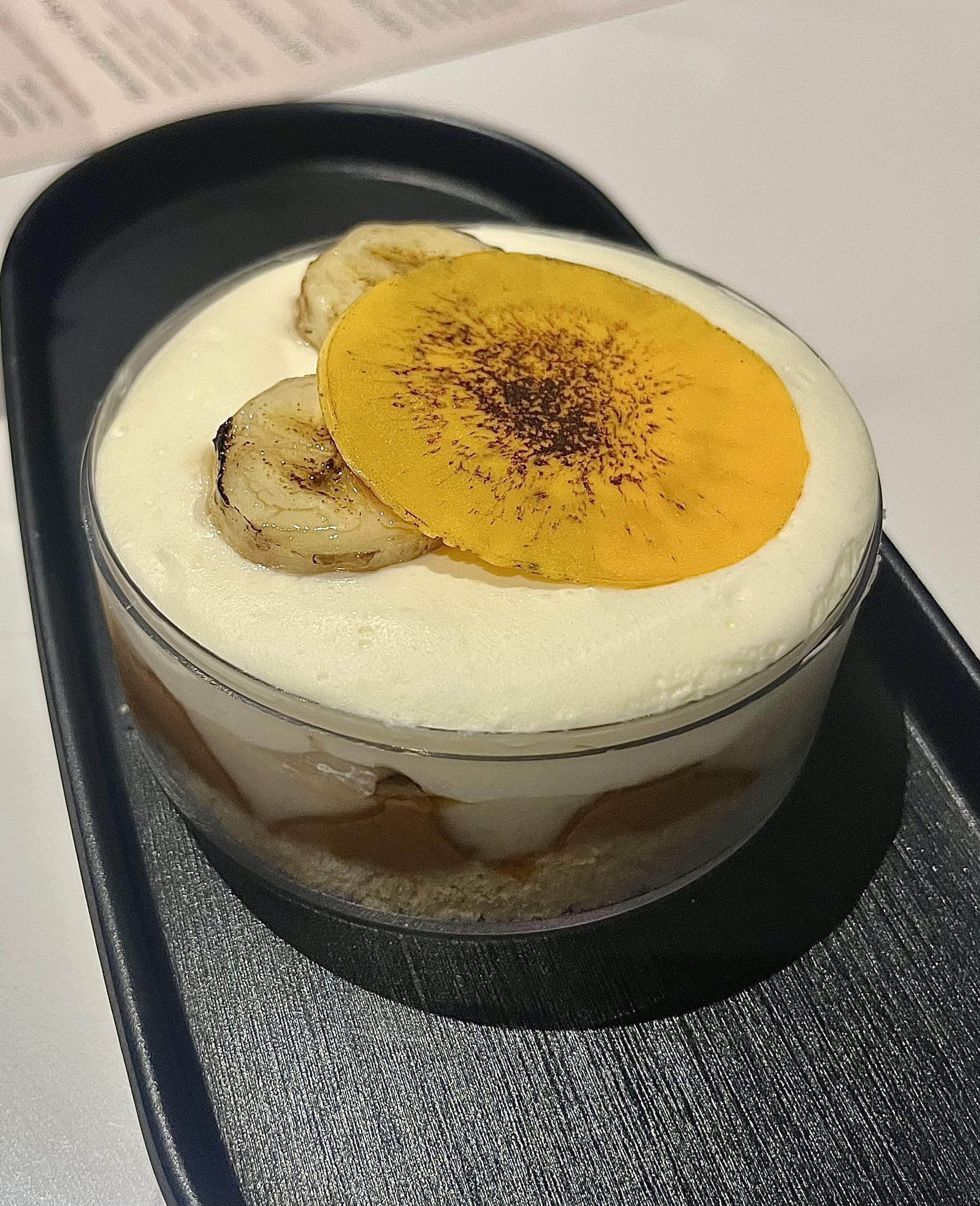
Banoffee pie with banana on top

== See also ==
- Banana cake
- Banana cream pie
- Sticky toffee pudding
- English cuisine
- List of banana dishes
- List of pies, tarts and flans
