= Pie in American cuisine =

History and cultural significance of pies in American cuisine

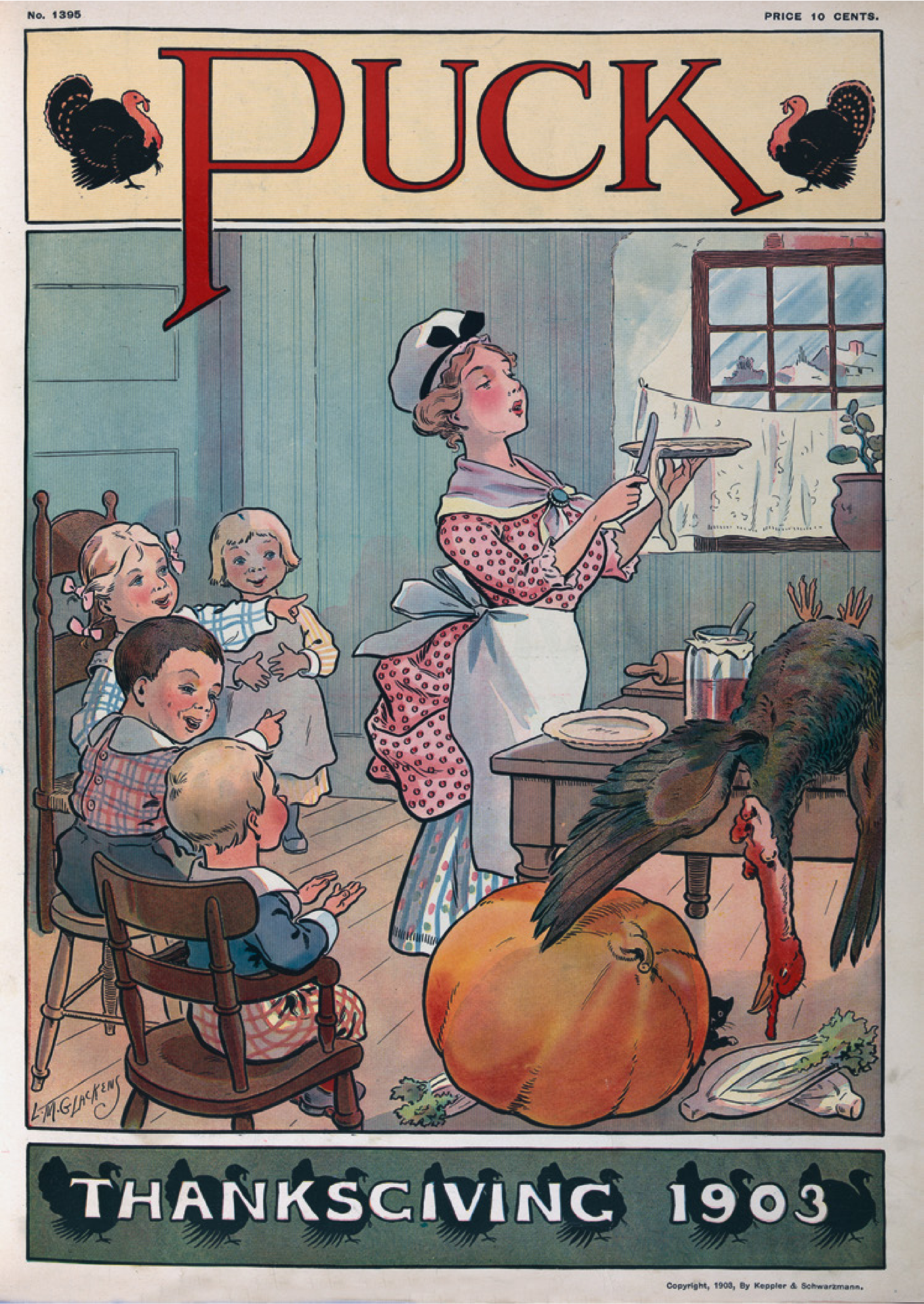
A young woman prepares a pie for Thanksgiving as children eagerly look on.

Pie in American cuisine evolved over centuries from savory game pies and fruit pies brought over by settlers. By the 1920s and 1930s there was growing consensus that cookbooks needed to be updated for the modern electric kitchen. New appliances, recipes and convenience food ingredients changed the way Americans made iconic dessert pies like key lime pie, coconut cream pie and banana cream pie.

== History ==
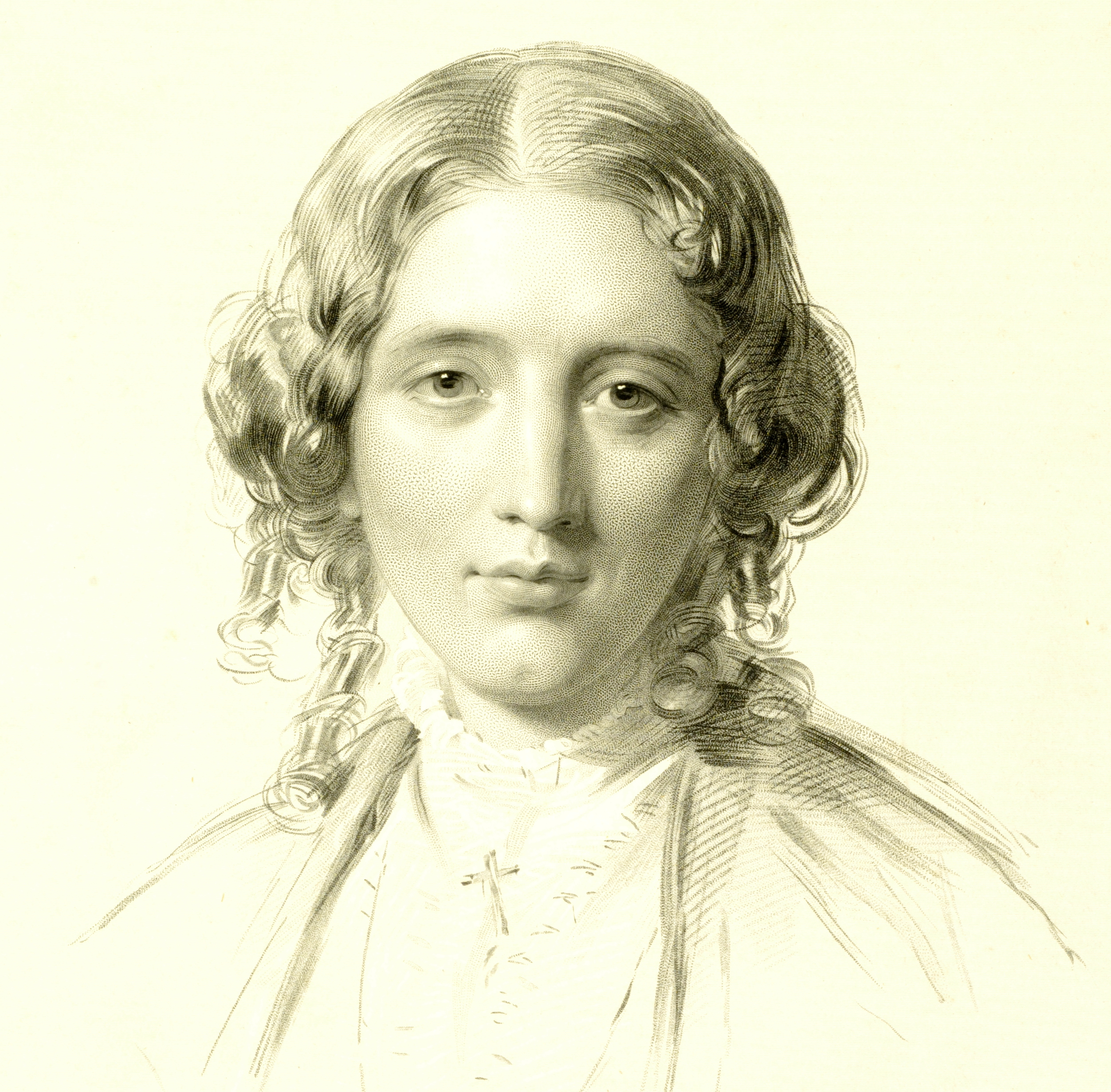
Harriet Beecher Stowe wrote in her 1869 novel Oldtown Folks, based on recollections of her childhood, that the variety of pies created by American housewives "attested the boundless fertility of the feminine mind".

During the colonial era, handmade raised pies were made in the colonies with techniques brought over from Britain. The first cookbook of the founding era to include recipes for pies was Amelia Simmons's American Cookery. The 1805 Virginia edition of Hannah Glasse's The Art of Cookery is the first published evidence of British recipes being adapted for a U.S. audience.

As settlers expanded into the Midwest Americans began making pies with wild American persimmon, chokecherry and other native fruits unknown in European cuisine. With the advent of tin production specialty pie plates became more widespread in the 18th century.

Women were responsible for figuring out how to make tasty pies at home, within their family budget. Transparent pies were practical and uplifting desserts made with just three ingredients: sugar, eggs and butter. In the 19th century as the nutrition science revolution was underway, high-fat pastry with sugary fillings gained negative reputations, including a warning in Harpers's Magazine in 1866, cautioning that "[p]ie in countless varieties...pie kills us". Despite this, pies remained popular, and in 1895 The New York Times said pie was the one food item common to all from "the first-class hotel to the penny stand at the corner".

By the 1920s and 30s pie recipes were beginning to be adapted to the now available electrical kitchen appliances, and desert pies like key lime pie, coconut cream pie and banana cream pie were created. Particularly popular in the era were pies made with meringue, including versions made with fruit (apples, apricots, grapefruit, raisins, etc.) and those made with sweets such as chocolate and custard. During World War II women used wartime rations to create "economical", "nourishing" and "thrifty" meals that could maintain morale. From this came desperation pies, also called make-do pies or poor man's pies, that relied on inexpensive ingredients such as sugar and milk and avoided expensive or seasonal ingredients such as nuts or fruit. Examples include chess pie, vinegar pie, buttermilk pie, mock apple pie (which used crackers in lieu of apples), water pie, transparent pie, sugar cream pie, and shoofly pie. Desperation pies had their origin in 19th-century thrift, and after the Depression were little made until they began to gain reputations as nostalgic.

== Types of sweet pies ==
Pies may be categorized by the main ingredient in the filling (e.g., pumpkin for pumpkin pie) or by cooking technique (e.g., custard for pumpkin pie, because the filling is a pumpkin custard). Alternative categorization schemes include historical era and purpose.

=== Custard and cream pies ===
==== Banana cream pie ====
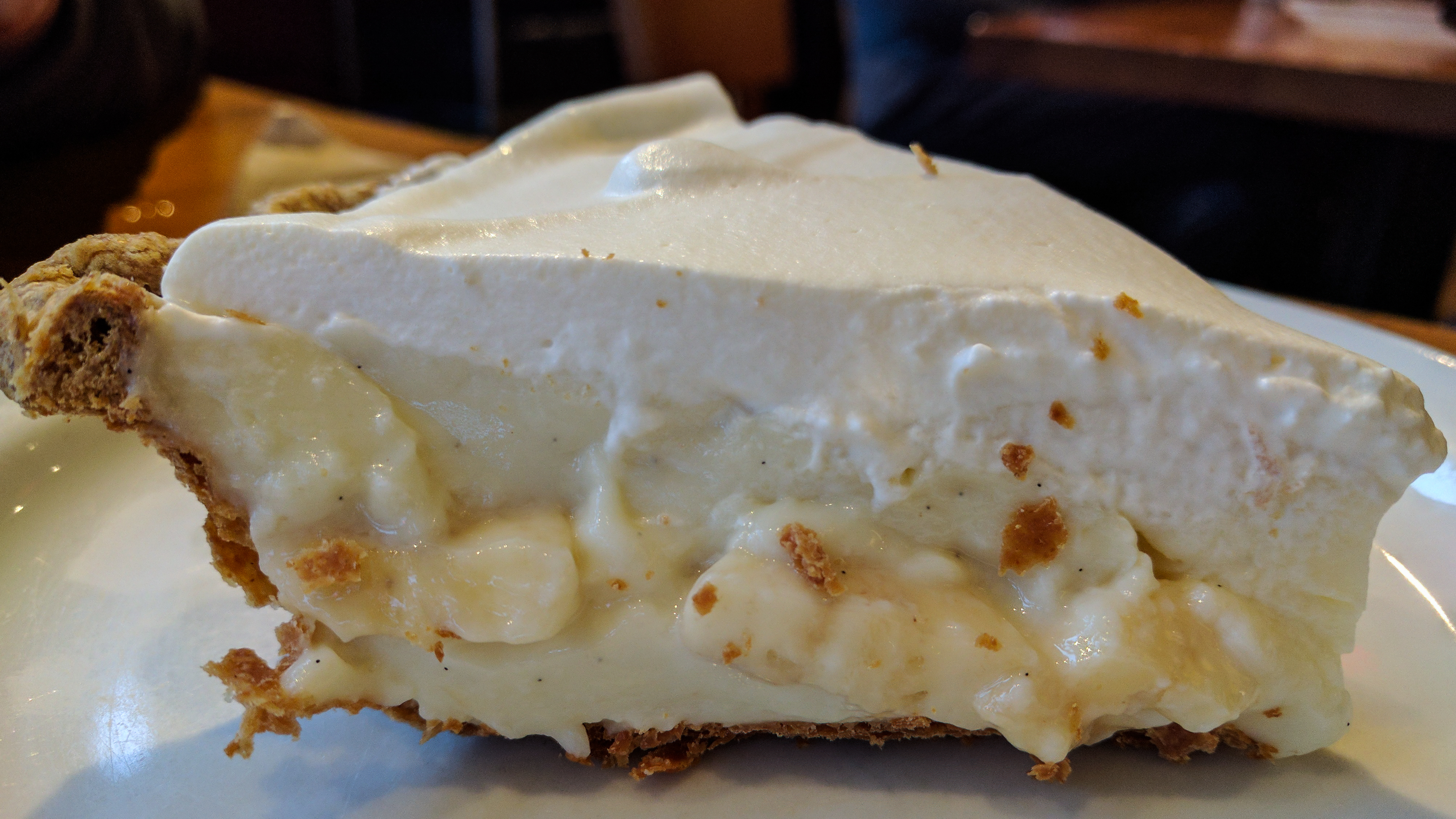
A slice of banana cream pie

Banana cream pie is a modified custard pie that dates to at least the 19th century. It was ranked the favorite dessert of the United States Armed Services in the 1950s. The no-bake pie filling is made with vanilla pudding or pastry cream, layered with sliced bananas and whipped cream.

==== Butterscotch pie ====
Butterscotch pie is made by cooking brown sugar with egg yolks, cornstarch, milk or cream and butter to make a butterscotch custard pie filling which is topped with meringue and browned in the oven. Its invention is said to date back to 1904, credited to a creamery in Connersville, Indiana, where the recipe was published in the 1904 edition of a Methodist church cookbook.

==== Buttermilk pie ====
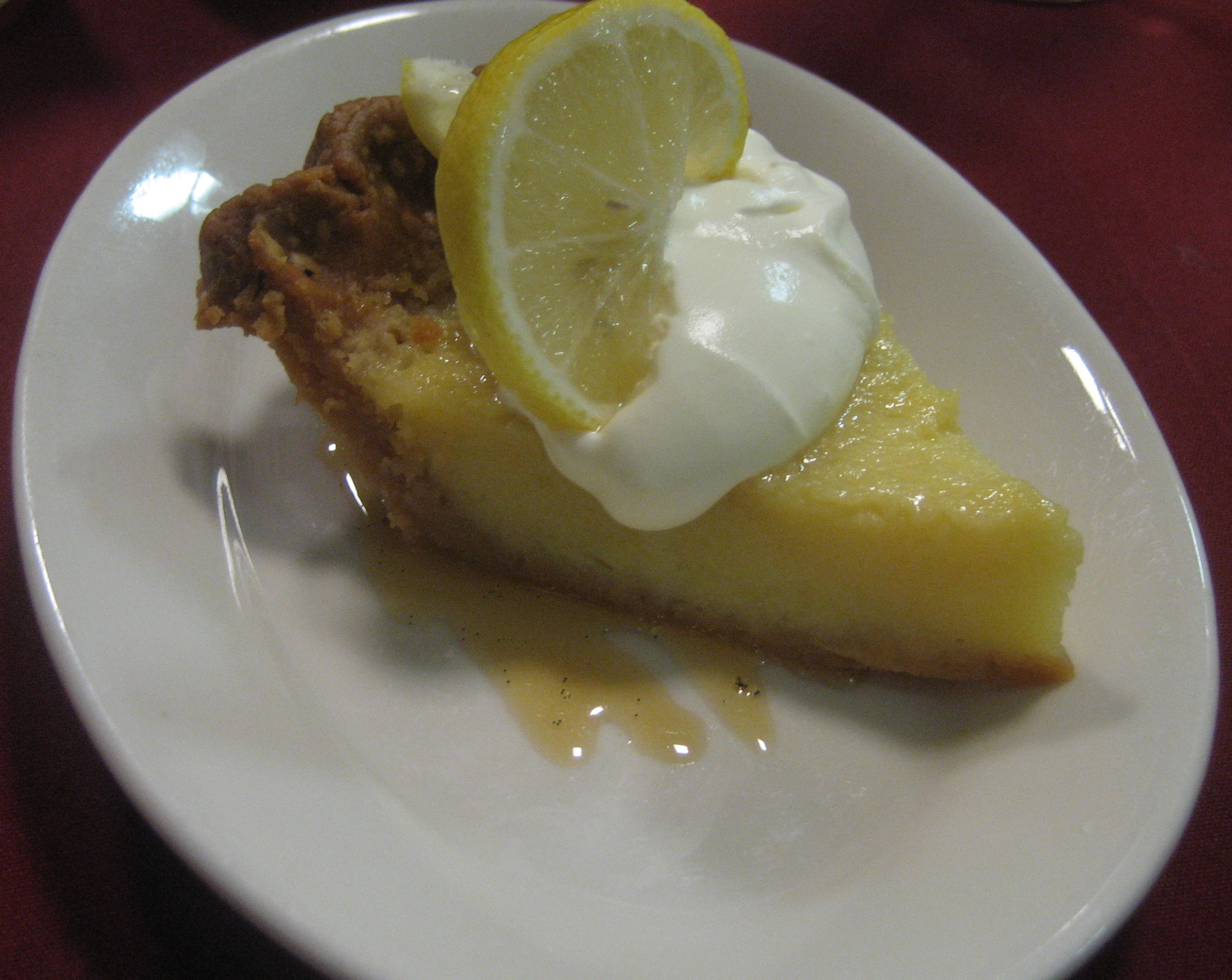
Lemon buttermilk pie

A 19th-century recipe for buttermilk pie is made by beating sugar with eggs, then adding butter and buttermilk. The custard is poured into a pastry-lined tin over a layer of thin apple slices. To make a buttermilk lemon pie, eggs, flour and sugar are beaten together, then buttermilk and lemon are added. The filling can be made with egg yolks, and the whites used for a meringue topping. Some versions add raisins, nutmeg, dates or vanilla flavoring. Buttermilk pie can be flavored with lemon or orange zest, the latter garnished with chopped walnuts, currants and cinnamon.

==== Maple cream pie ====
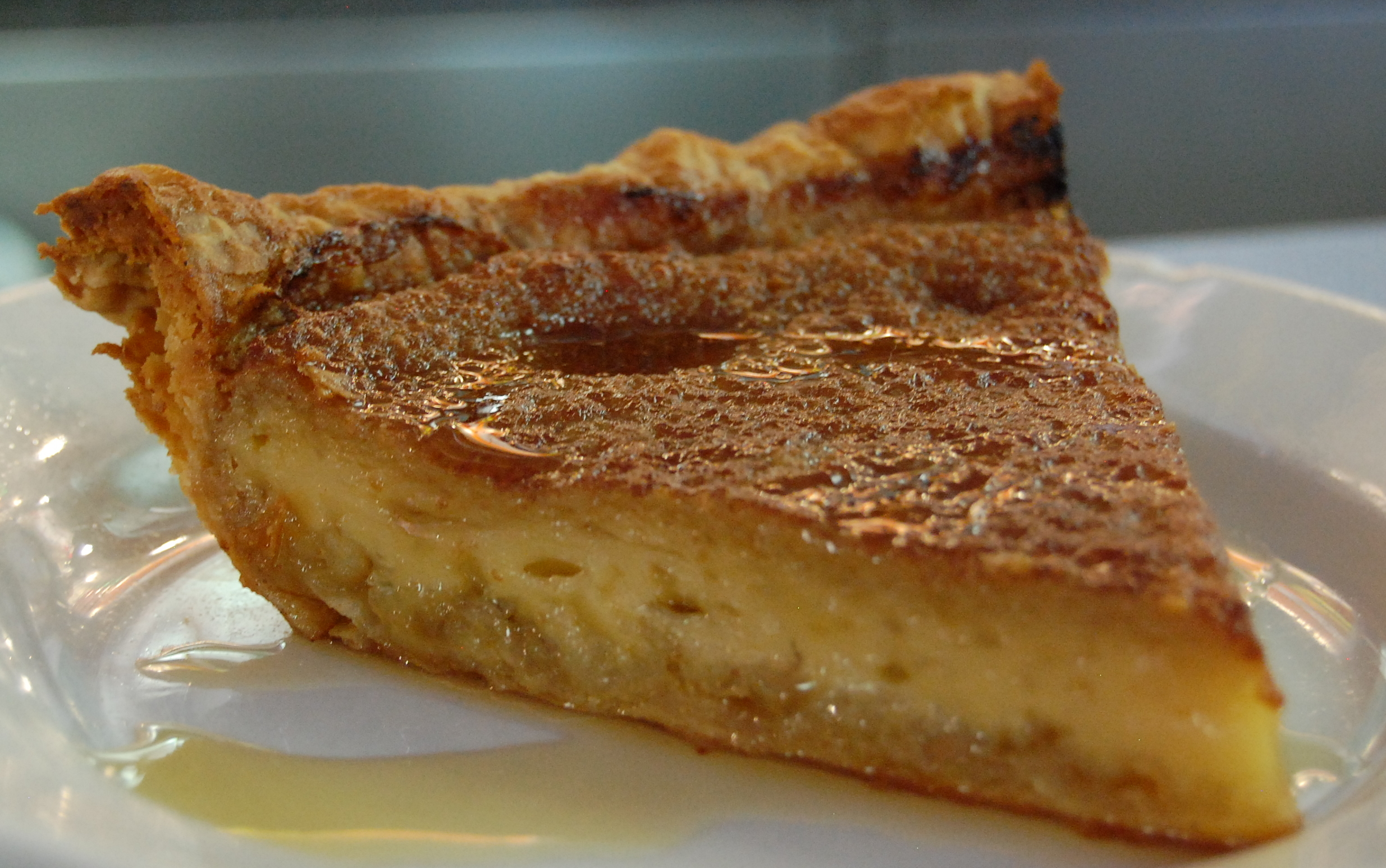
Maple custard pie from the cuisine of New England

A 1939 recipe for maple cream pie is made with maple sugar and scalded milk in a double boiler. Cornstarch is added to the sweetened milk to make a thin paste which is poured over beaten eggs, then cooked all together briefly then butter, vanilla and salt are stirred. Once cooled the custard is poured into the pie shell, served topped with whipped cream. Some versions are baked in the oven.

In anti-slavery New England William Fox and others advocated for the boycott of sugar from the West Indies to pressure slaveholders. Maple sugar became a substitute for cane sugar, first advanced by Benjamin Rush who published a tract on sugar maples in 1788, and soon after founded the Society for Promoting the Manufacture of Sugar from the Sugar Maple Tree.

Thomas Jefferson took up the cause, vowing to use "no other sugar in his family than that which is obtained from the sugar maple tree." He obtained 50 pounds of maple sugar from writing in 1790 to Benjamin Vaughan that high-quality sugar would be obtained from local maples with "no other labor than what the women and girls can bestow ... What a blessing to substitute sugar which requires only the labour of children, for that which it is said renders the slavery of the blacks necessary," but Jefferson's maple grove did not take to the Virginia climate and all the trees died. The tradition of making maple pie, although not as common as it used to be, continues to symbolize New England values of a simple lifestyle and economic independence.

==== Pumpkin pie ====
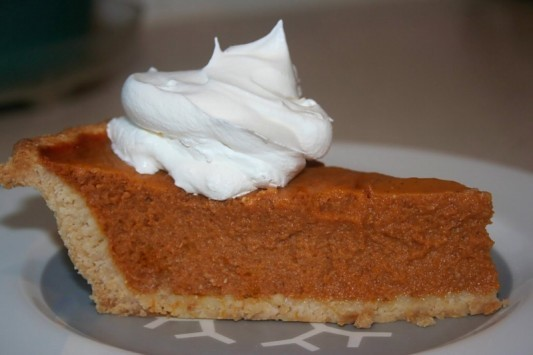
Slice of pumpkin pie with whipped cream

By the time Amelia Simmons had published American Cookery, the first American cookbook, in 1796, pumpkin pie that has originated in the UK had evolved into a form similar to the pumpkin pies of the modern day. American Cookery included two recipes for "pompkin pudding" baked in pie crust. While early pumpkin pies were made like fruit pies with sliced or fried pumpkin combined with spice, sugar and apples in a pastry crust, Simmons' recipe was for a pumpkin custard filling made with sugar, eggs and cream. The custard version of pumpkin pie appears in later cookbooks like The Virginia Housewife (1824) where it is made with brandy and a lattice-top, and in Eliza Leslie's 1827 cookbook where it appears as "pumpkin pudding". The pumpkin pie became a Thanksgiving standard, featured in Lydia Maria Child's 1844 poem The New-England Boy's Song about Thanksgiving Day:

Over the river, and through the wood—
Now grandmother's cap I spy!
Hurra for the fun!
Is the pudding done?
Hurra for the pumpkin pie!

==== Raisin and sour cream pie ====
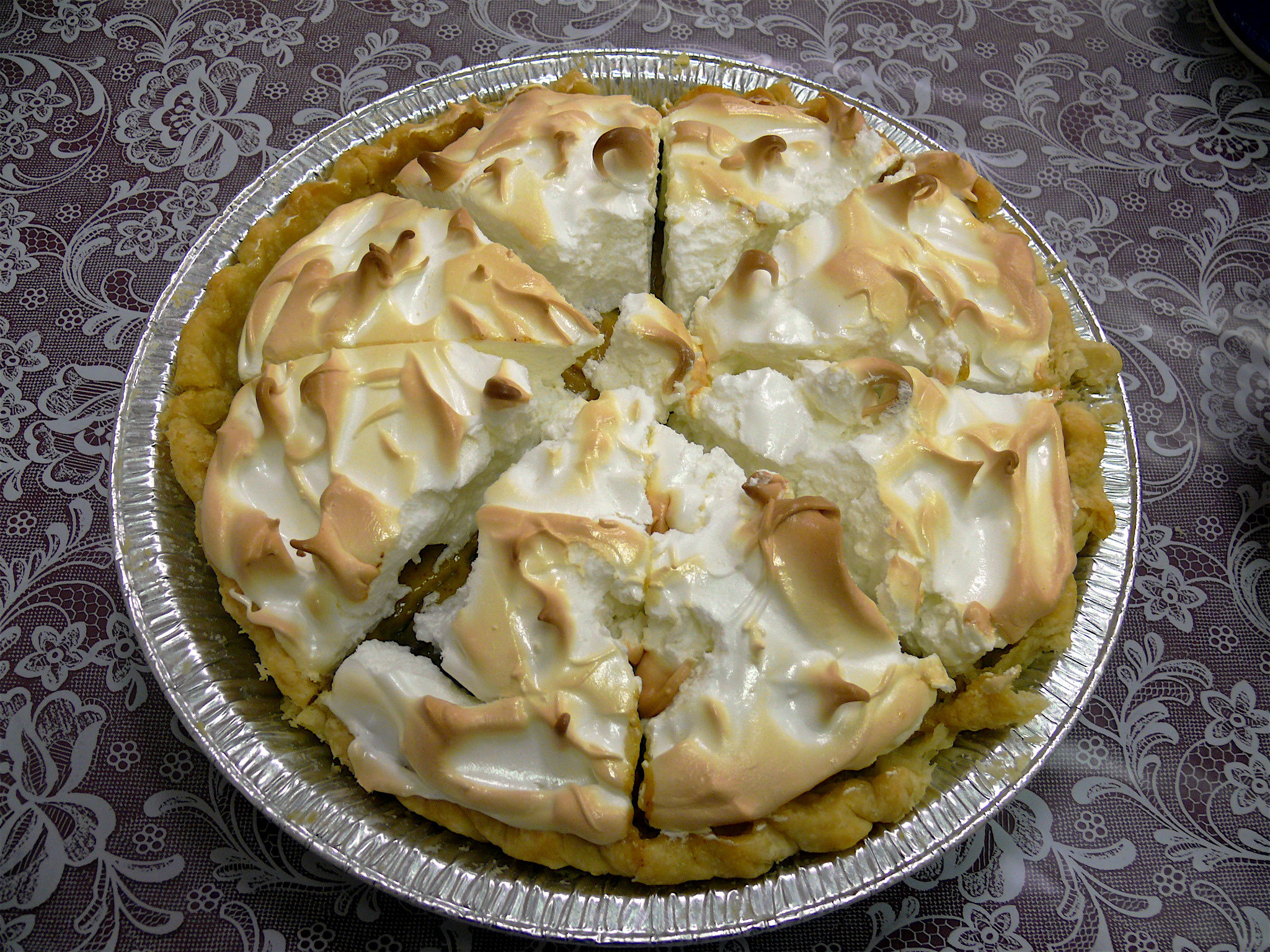
Sour cream and raisin pie with meringue topping

This meringue-topped baked custard pie is made with sugar, egg yolks, sour cream, flour and raisins, baked in a pastry-lined pie dish until the custard filling is set. Some recipes add pecans to the filling, or spices like cinnamon and cloves.

==== Sweet potato pie ====
To make the filling for a sweet potato pie, sugar, eggs, butter and milk are added to pureed sweet potatoes with a little nutmeg. The ingredients are whipped and baked in an open-faced pie crust.

An article from 1903 compared sweet potato pie and pumpkin pie, saying of pumpkin pie "In its way it is very good, particularly if seasonings are put in it to give it the palatableness that it lacks. But we can not admit that the pumpkin pie is equal to the sweet potato pie, when the latter is compounded according to approved antebellum recipes." The article goes on to note the declining popularity of the "old-fashioned" sweet potato pie, attributing it to the increased availability of canned pie fillings and commercially baked pies.

==== Vinegar pie ====
Vinegar pie was one of the most popular Southern desserts in the 19th and early 20th centuries, and during the Great Depression. It is one of the desperation pies. These are homemade pies made with staple ingredients, usually eggs, butter, flour and sugar, though often even eggs and butter were omitted in lean times. Made with a small amount of vinegar sweetened with a lot of sugar, it was a very simple type of pie and inexpensive to make, at times when fresh lemons were a luxury.

=== Fruit pies ===
==== Apple pie ====
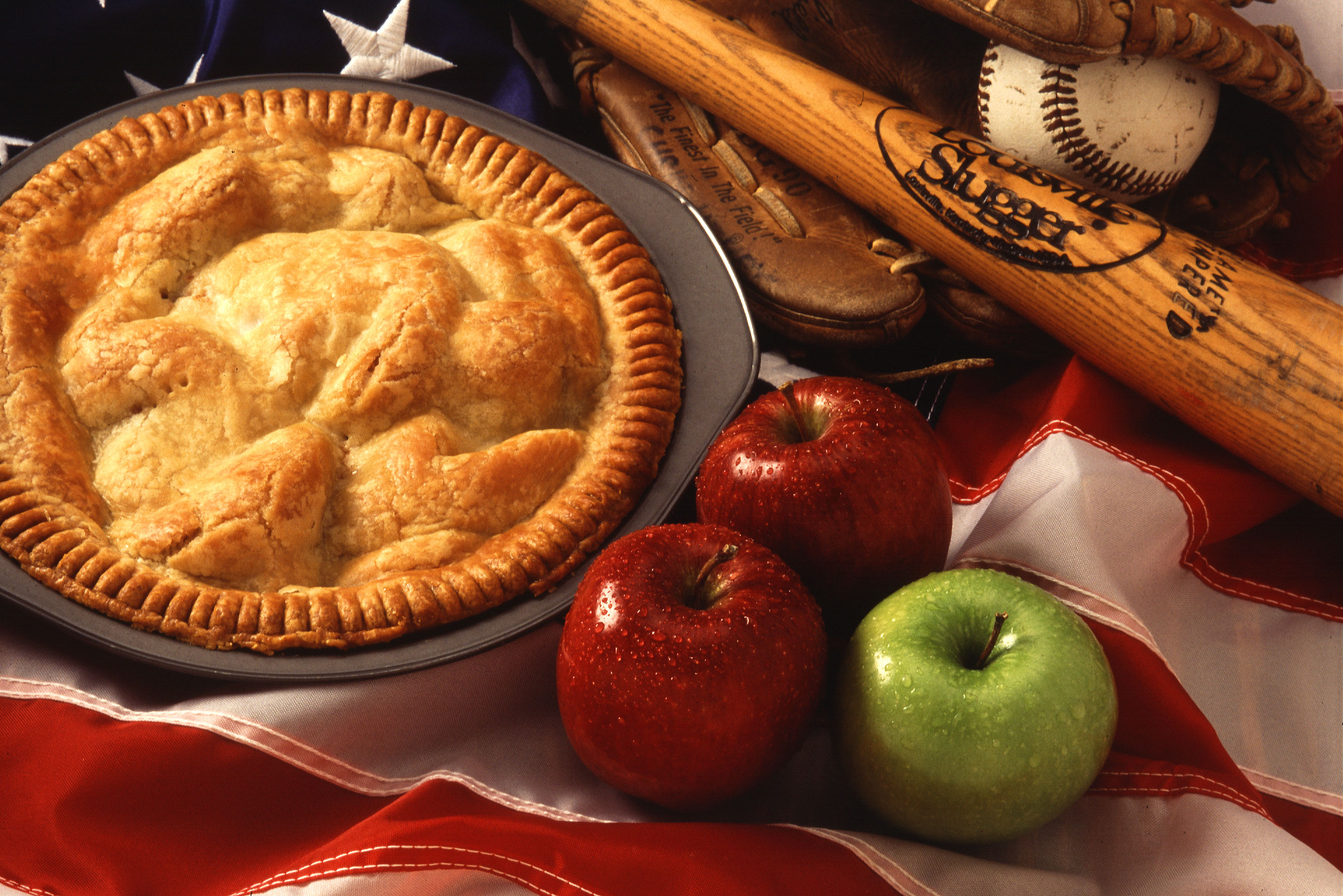
Apple pie, baseball bat and the American flag

There are many variations on the basic apple pie that may add raisins, dried cranberries, or caramel candies to the filling, or replace the traditional pastry top crust with iced cinnamon rolls or streusel toppings like nut streusel or oatmeal streusel. Cinnamon is commonly used, and sometimes more elaborate mixes of spices that include nutmeg or allspice. Some recipes add apple cider, whiskey or maple syrup to the filling, or replace some of the white sugar with brown sugar.

In the 19th and 20th centuries, apple pie became a symbol of American prosperity and national pride. The phrase "as American as apple pie" has entered the popular lexicon.

==== Blueberry pie ====
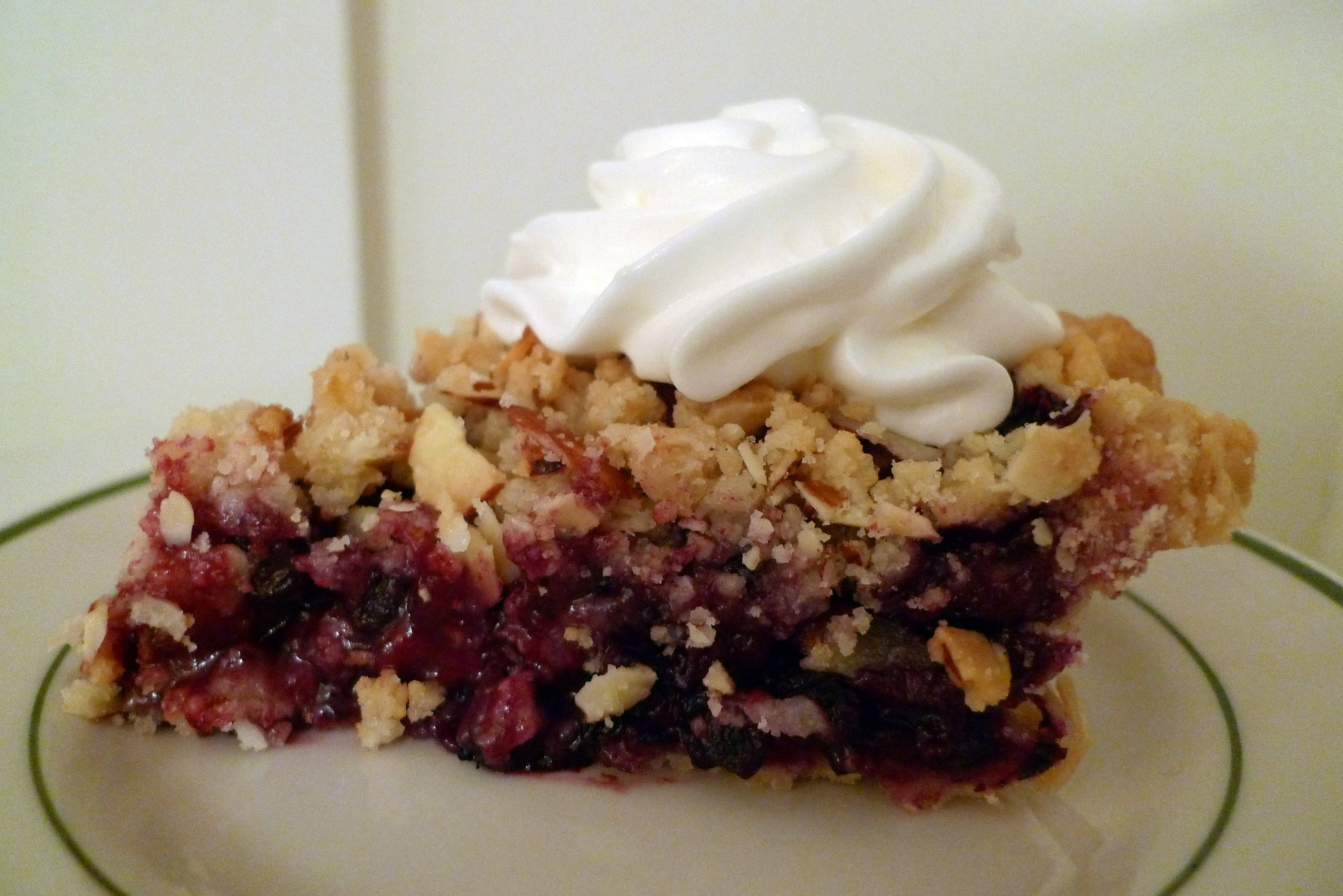
Blueberry pie with streusel topping

Blueberry pie recipes are known from the mid-19th century, which is later than for other fruits like apple pie. One recipe from 1850 is made with just flour-dredged blueberries and sugar baked in pastry. Wild blueberry pie has been the official state dessert of Maine since 2011.

Blueberry pie filling can be made with fresh blueberries, sugar, thickener and lemon or lime juice. Vanilla can also be added. Sugar can be a mix of white and brown sugars, and the filling can be thickened with cornstarch, tapioca flour or all purpose flour. The pie can be made with a basic streusel or crumble topping instead of top crust, to which oats or nuts can be added.

To make a blueberry pie with creamy filling, heavy cream can be poured into the pie through the vent hole before serving, or it can be made with shredded coconut and cream cheese.

Cranberries, blackberries, orange zest, marshmallows, peaches or basil can be added to the filling.

Blueberry pie can be served warm with vanilla ice cream, topped with whipped cream or drizzled with a simple powdered sugar or currant jelly glaze.

==== Cherry pie ====
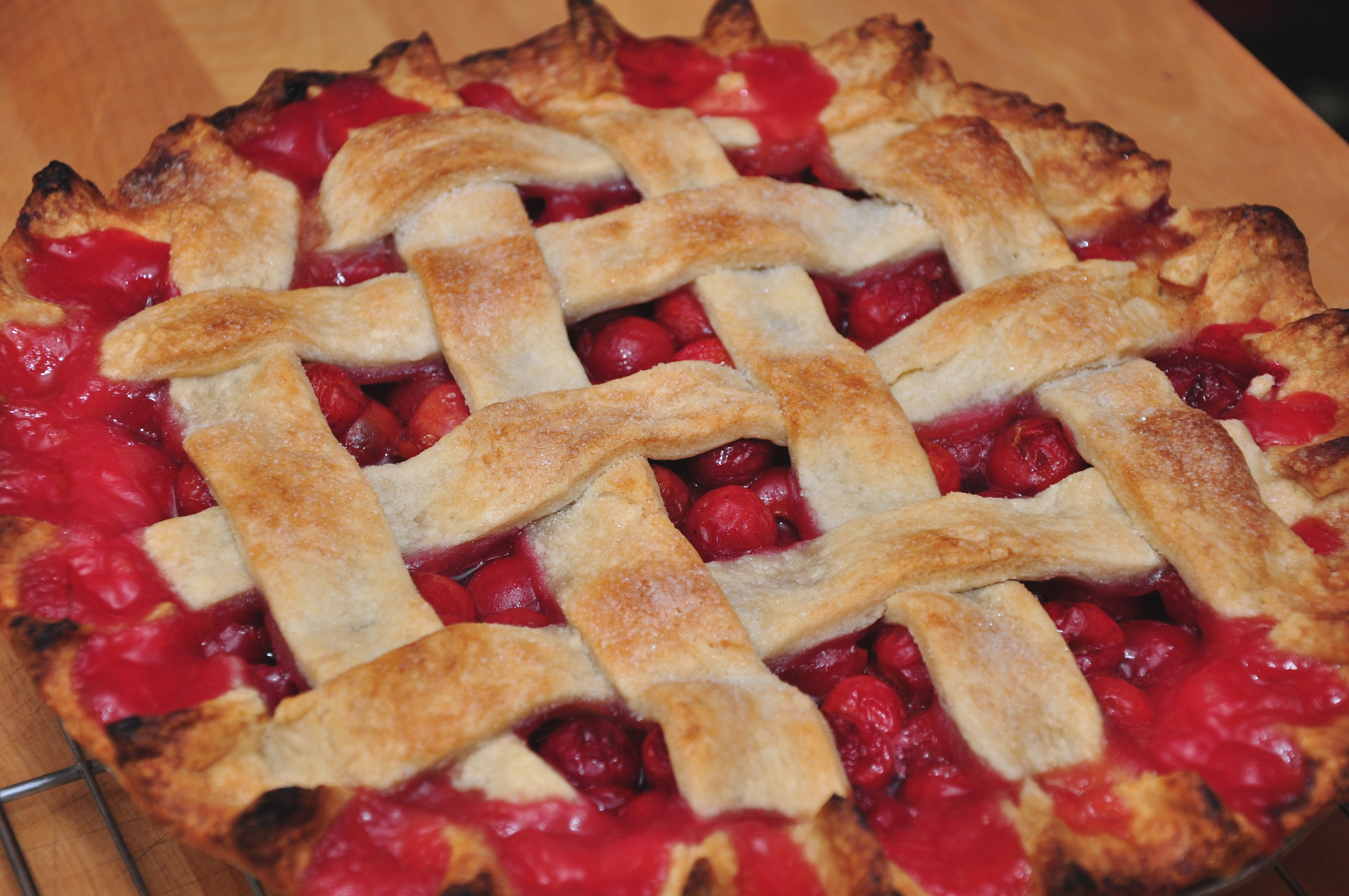
Cherry pie with a lattice top crust

A basic cherry pie can be made by simmering cherry juice with sugar, cornstarch and a pinch of salt in a saucepan until thickened. Once thickened, butter is stirred in, then the mixture is poured over the pitted cherries into a pastry-lined pie dish and baked in a hot oven. Lattice top crust is a common choice for cherry pies.

The filling of a cherry pie can be made with fresh, frozen or canned cherries. A variation on the basic filling can be made on the stovetop by simmering canned cherries with water and cherry juice with a mixture of vanilla pudding, sugar and lemon juice. The mixture is boiled then removed from the heat and butter is added. Red food coloring can be used to give the pie a more intense red color. This filling is cooked entirely on the stovetop, without baking, and poured directly into a pre-baked pie shell.

Some recipes add pineapple to the basic filling to make cherry-pineapple pie. There are different ways to make this filling. A no-bake version is made by adding the fruit to orange gelatin and making a topping with crushed bananas and chopped nuts. For baked versions of the pie, the filling is similar to other preparations, with crushed pineapple added.

There are other variations of cherry pie, such as the cherry angel pie made by filling a meringue bottom crust with vanilla custard and canned cherries. This pie filling is not baked, but chilled in the refrigerator, and garnished with whipped cream before serving.

Canned cherry pie filling is also used as a topping for other types of pies like custard pie, ice cream pie and cheesecake pie.

==== Green tomato pie ====
Green tomatoes are used to make "mock mincemeat" with apples and raisins, to imitate the flavor of a mincemeat pie, by cooking green tomatoes with sugar and apples, vinegar, raisins and spices until thickened. Some versions add orange peel, jelly, fruit juice or butter. This mock mincemeat is used as pie filling.

Green tomato pie can also be made like other fruit pies, by sprinkling sugar, flour, cinnamon and other spices or raisins over sliced tomatoes and pieces of butter, or by cooking the ingredients on the stovetop before baking in a pastry-lined dish.

==== Mixed berry pie ====
Berry pie is made with a mix of berries like blueberry, raspberry, blackberry and strawberry using frozen, canned or fresh berries. Spices include ginger, nutmeg, cinnamon and allspice, and sometimes coconut is added. The pie can be glazed by brushing the top crust with milk and sugar before baking, or it can be glazed with egg whites and fruit preserves.

Raspberry and strawberry fillings are also layered with chocolate, custard, vanilla pudding or cream cheese fillings, and topped with fresh fruits, jam, hot fudge or whipped cream to make layered no-bake pies.

==== Peach pie ====
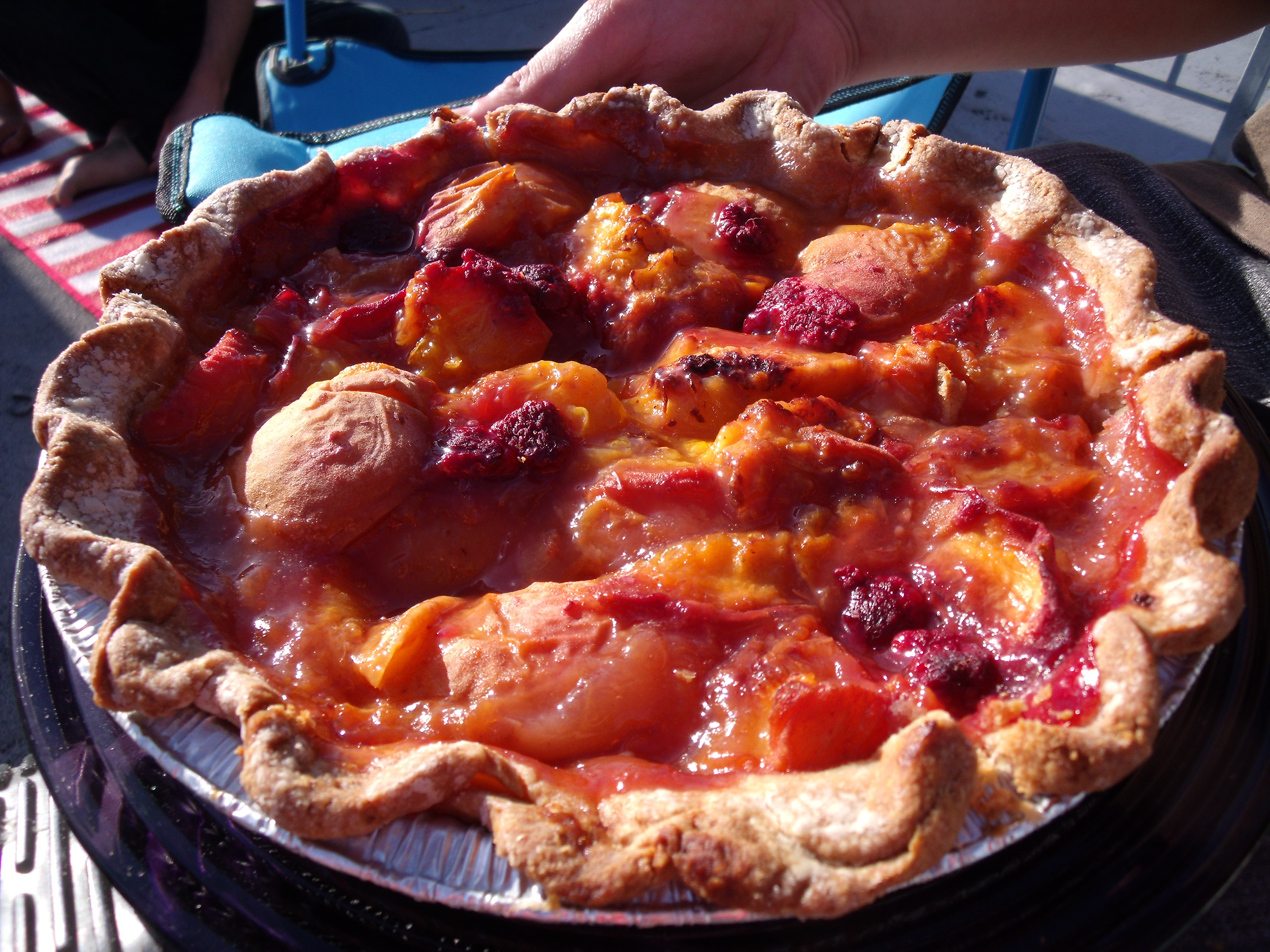
Raspberry-peach pie made with fresh fruits

Peach pie is made with fresh, frozen or canned peaches. The basic fruit pie filling, made with fresh fruit, lemon juice, sugar and cornstarch, can be frozen in advance and used later. The basic fresh peach pie can be combined with other fruits like strawberry, blueberry, blackberry, apple, pear or prunes. Peach pie can be topped with whipped cream or streusel with other ingredients like nuts, fresh fruit, coconut or cinnamon.

The peaches n' cream variation is made with cream cheese and egg yolk. Some versions also add sour cream. Peaches can be used in a cream pie made with vanilla pudding and fresh fruit slices in a graham cracker crust. There are also several varieties of peach ice cream pie made with vanilla or peach ice cream, fruit and sometimes raspberry sorbet and other ingredients.

Black bottom peach pie is made with a chocolate cookie crumb crust. The no-bake filling is made by dissolving gelatin in peach syrup and adding crushed canned peaches and lemon juice, then folding in whipped cream when the mixture has cooled enough that it starts to thicken.

==== Shaker lemon pie ====
Shaker lemon pie is a four-ingredient pie that originated in the Shaker communities of the Midwestern United States. To make this pie, lemon slices and sugar are placed in a bowl for several hours until the lemons are juicy, then eggs are beaten in and the mixture is poured into a pastry-lined pie dish. After it is baked, the pie can be served with ice cream, either warm or at room temperature.

=== Transparent pies ===
While "desperation pies" are made with simple custard fillings, the closely related transparent pies are made with sugar and/or corn syrup baked with eggs and butter into a translucent gel. They are similar to the molasses-based shoofly pie.

==== Chess pie ====
Chess pie has been a classic pie of Southern cuisine for centuries. The basic ingredients of butter, sugar and eggs, thickened with either cornmeal or flour, are common to all chess pie recipes. There are variations on the basic recipe that add other ingredients like milk, buttermilk, lemon zest and dried fruits or nuts.

==== Pecan pie ====
Pecan pie is a classic Southern dessert pie. It was not until the 1930s that pecan pie became very popular, after the recipe was printed on the labels for commercially produced bottles of corn syrup. Some historians consider this recipe the original, but earlier published recipes for milk-custard pecan pies are known from as early as 1824, such as one found in The Virginia Housewife, and there are syrup-based pecan pie recipes dating to 1921. The Derby pie and Tar heel pie are variations on the classic pecan pie.

=== Other ===
==== Grasshopper pie ====
Grasshopper pie is a no-bake mousse pie with a chocolate crumb crust. The filling can be made with marshmallows or cream cheese. The cream cheese version is made by adding green food coloring to a mixture of condensed milk with cream cheese, then gently folding in chocolate covered mint cookie crumbs and whipped topping. Alternately, a mixture of creme de menthe, creme de cacao and melted marshmallows can be gently folded into fresh whipped cream.

Variations of the chocolate cookie crumb crust can be made with wafer crumbs or crumbled sandwich cookies, or by melting chocolate in a double boiler and stirring in toasted rice cereal, then pressing the mixture into a pie dish and allowing it to set in the refrigerator.

The pastel-colored pie is associated with springtime, and especially with Easter celebrations in the United States.

==== Chocolate cherry pie ====
Chocolate cherry pie, said to have evolved from a Viennese cake, can be made in different ways. A no-bake chocolate cherry pie can be made by pouring chocolate pudding over cherries with a layer of whipped topping and whole cherries. In a variation, cocoa powder can be added to the bottom crust that is filled with homemade chocolate pudding with a layer of canned cherry pie filling with whipped cream topping.

Alternatively, another version of no-bake chocolate cherry pie is made by simmering sugar, flour and milk in a saucepan until thickened, then mixing in gelatin and cherry juice. Once cooled the gelatin is gently folded into whipped egg whites together with pieces of maraschino cherry and grated chocolate, and garnished with whipped cream before serving.

Chocolate cherry pie can also be made with sweet cherries and a basic custard flavored with chocolate cherry liqueur.

==== Mud pie ====
Mud pie is a type of pie with many variations that can be made at home but is also a common dessert at American restaurants. One of the simplest no-bake versions is made with only four ingredients, mocha or coffee ice cream in a chocolate cookie crumb crust with a generous topping of whipped cream and warm fudge sauce. Sometimes coffee liquor or Kahlua is added, or cookies mixed in, and some versions made with eggs are baked like other custard pies. Often associated with the cuisine of the Deep South, especially Mississippi, the mud pie can be found in other regions of the country as well. The name is said to come from the effect created by hot fudge sauce melting the ice cream as it is poured over individual slices of pie.

==== Peanut butter pie ====
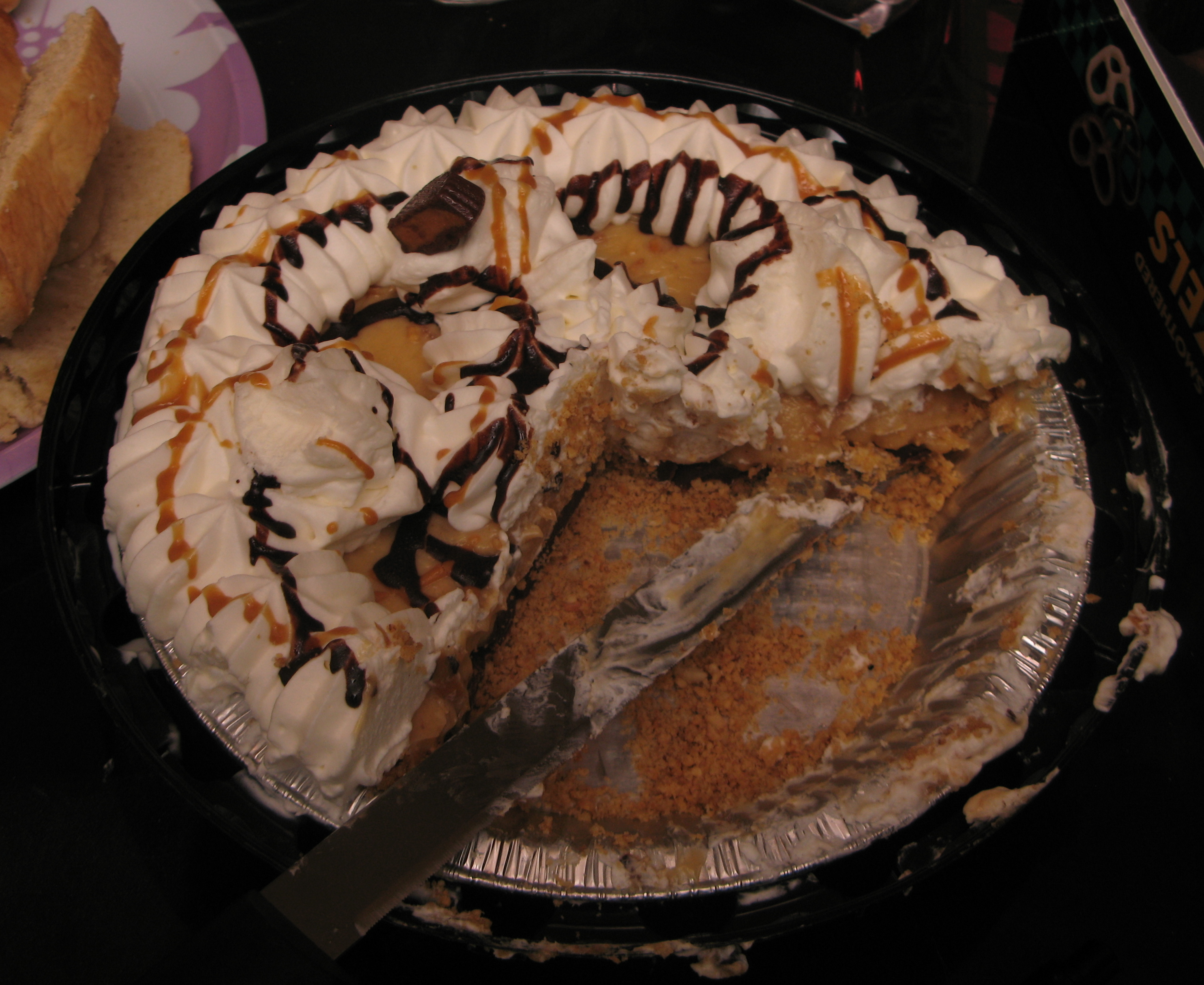
Peanut butter pie with peanut butter cups and whipped topping

The filling for peanut butter pie can be made with corn syrup or flour and milk. If milk is being used, the filling is made in a double boiler by melting sugar with flour and slowly adding milk, stirring, then adding egg yolks. The peanut butter is added to this prepared mixture, which is allowed to cool, then poured into a pre-baked pastry and served with whipped cream or meringue. Alternately, corn syrup can be mixed with the other ingredients and baked in the oven. Some recipes layer the peanut butter custard filling with a topping of gelatin and whipped egg whites folded into plain custard.

Chocolate peanut butter pie is a variation made with a filling of sweetened peanut butter layered into a pie shell made of frozen whipped cream and topped with a chocolate ice cream and whipped cream mixture. This pie is served frozen.

==== Possum pie ====
Possum pie is an icebox pie that is rarely found outside Arkansas. There are many variations of the layered filling usually involving a layer of cream cheese and chocolate pudding in a pecan shortbread pie shell. The version called "The Next Best Thing to Robert Redford" also added a vanilla pudding layer. The whole thing is generously topped with whipped cream and chopped nuts. The first printed recipes calling this dessert "Possum pie" appear in the late 2000s, but similar pies have been known by various names since at least the 1970s, including "The Next Best Thing to Robert Redford".

==== Rhubarb pie ====
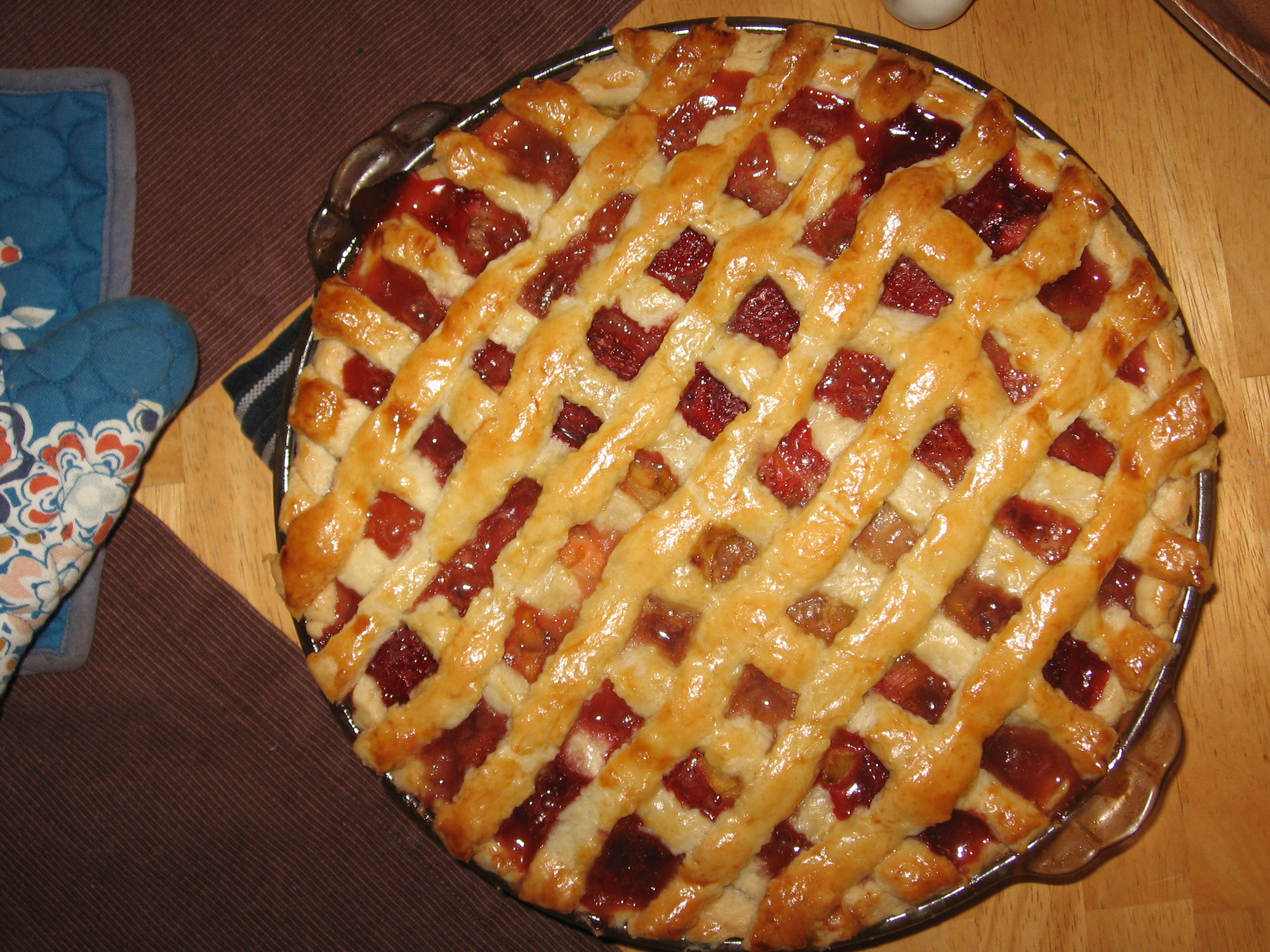
Strawberry rhubarb pie with lattice pie crust

There are different styles of filling for rhubarb pie. An early recipe for "Pie Plant Pies" from 1874 was made with just four ingredients: sugar and rhubarb stems, water and a little flour as a thickener. Strawberries and butter can be added to the basic recipe for strawberry rhubarb pie. For a baked custard filling egg yolks and butter can be added. This style of pie can be topped with meringue. Some recipes also add milk to the filling.

== Savory pies ==
In general, savory pies are less common in American cooking than they are in the United Kingdom and Australia, evidenced by the many editions of cookbooks over the centuries always having fewer savory pie recipes than sweet.

=== Poultry ===
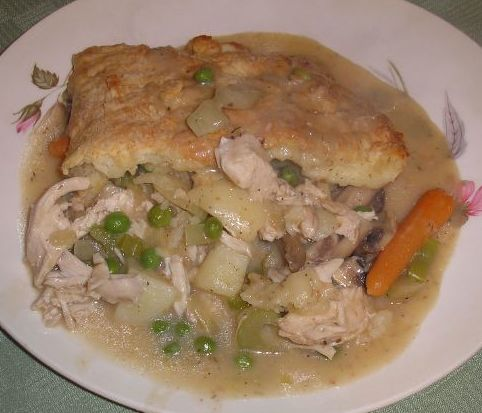
Chicken pie in gravy

Poultry pies in the 18th century were a more general class of pie including chicken, but also turkey, duck, goose or any other small or large wild bird. While pigeon pie became immensely popular in England, it reached American shores only to be overshadowed by turkey and chicken. Early recipes for chicken pie from European cuisine were a mix of sweet ingredients like dates and gooseberries, spices like mace and all kinds of meats like tongue, coxcombs, mutton and other ingredients added to the pie along with the chicken.

American cooks stripped many of the European elements to create a dish representative of post-Revolution values like thrift and moderation. Leftover chickens and turkeys were turned into pies layered with dumplings.

Chicken pie became an essential dish at Thanksgiving meals, featured in Sarah Josepha Hale's novel Northwood: Life North and South:

This pie, which is wholly formed of the choicest parts of fowls, enriched and seasoned with a profusion of butter and pepper, and covered with an excellent puff paste is, like celebrated pumpkin pie, an indispensable part of a good and true Yankee Thanksgiving

Edward Everett Hale wrote that "...there was no other day on which we had four kinds of pies on the table and plum pudding beside, not to say chicken pie."

Harrier Beecher Stowe wrote in Old Town Folks:

In winter's doldrums, chicken pies became a respite from the numbing similitude of preserved meats, baked beans and brown bread suppers. The fresh cheer that chicken pies brought to the winter dark and their rekindling of holiday celebrations cemented their place in our regional cuisine.

In Esther Allen Howland's 19th-century cookbook, chicken pie appears on a menu for Thanksgiving dinner made with parboiled chicken and gravy.

=== Salmon ===
Catholic French-Canadians who settled in New England ate salmon pie on Fridays when observant Catholics abstain from eating meat. It was also eaten during Lent. There are several variations of the simple pie, made with canned salmon. The salmon could be combined with mayonnaise and lemon juice and baked in pastry and served with mushroom gravy. Vegetables could be added such as celery, carrots, potatoes and peas. Some versions include onions, green pepper, or milk and creamed corn thickened with egg.

=== Tourtière ===
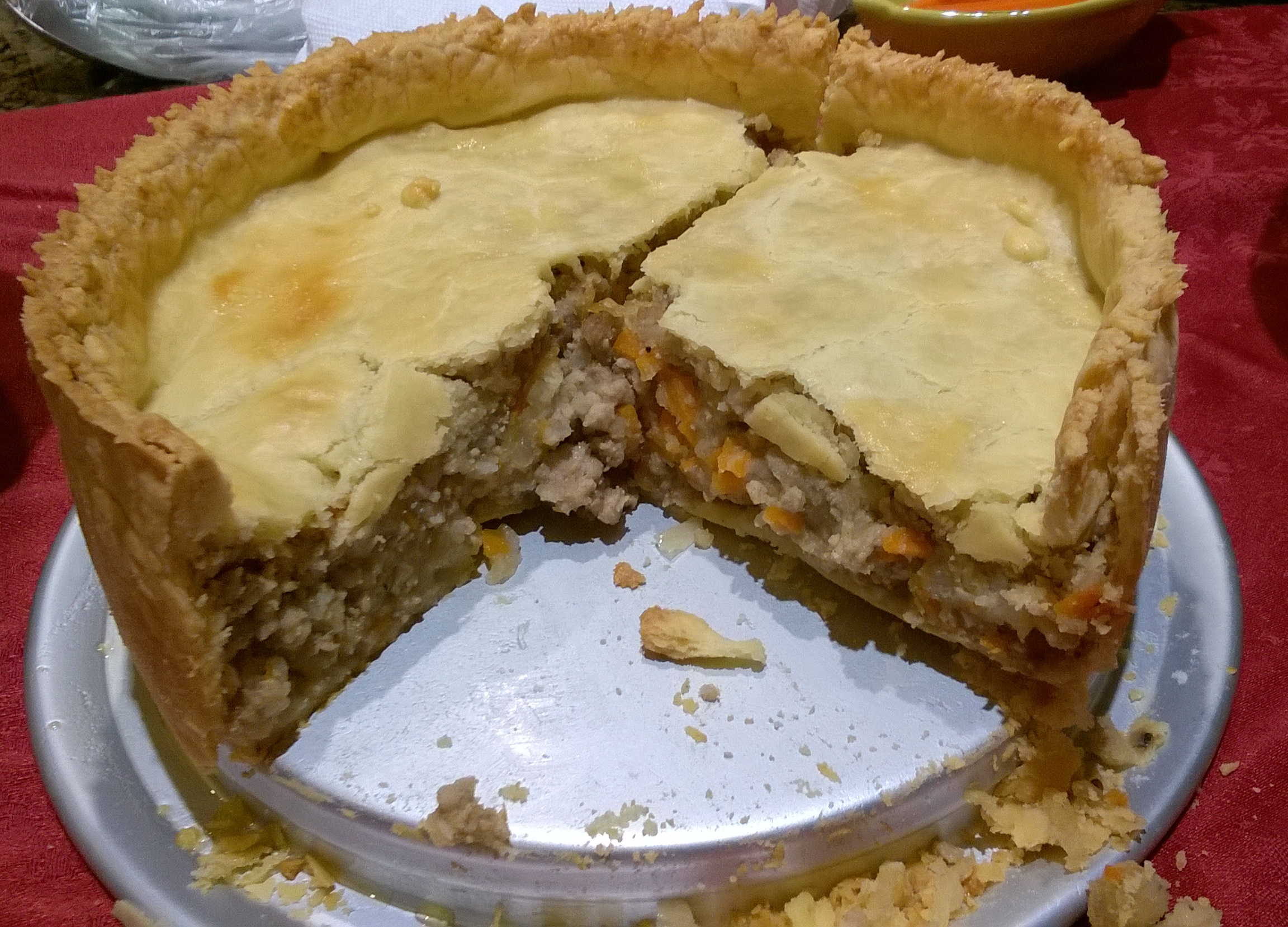
A tourtière meat pie

Tourtière is a French-Canadian meat pie, usually prepared for the Christmas Réveillon meal. Although its roots may lie in Medieval cuisine, the story of how the pie arrives in New England remains a matter of dispute. Some say that meat pies first arrived in Canada in the 17th century, others say the particular form of the dish made with potatoes, fragrant spices like cloves and cinnamon, and game birds and animals evolved in Quebec. It arrived in New England with French-Canadian immigrants, who made up nearly one-tenth of New England's population by 1900. It has become a symbol of regional French-Canadian identity that has survived assimilation and language loss. In the United States the fragrant spices are toned down, and cloves often replaced by allspice, which is the most common spice in American versions of the pie. There are many regional variations of the basic mince and potato pie.

== Preferences ==
A 2008 survey by the American Pie Council found that 19% of Americans preferred apple pie, making it the most popular pie in the United States, followed by pumpkin pie (13%), pecan pie (12%), banana cream pie (10%) and cherry pie (9%). Pie remains the most popular dessert choice for holidays (followed by cake and cookies).

== See also ==
- Boston cream pie, a layer cake
- Washington pie, a layer cake
- Pies in Pennsylvania
