= Butterscotch pie =

Pie in American cuisine

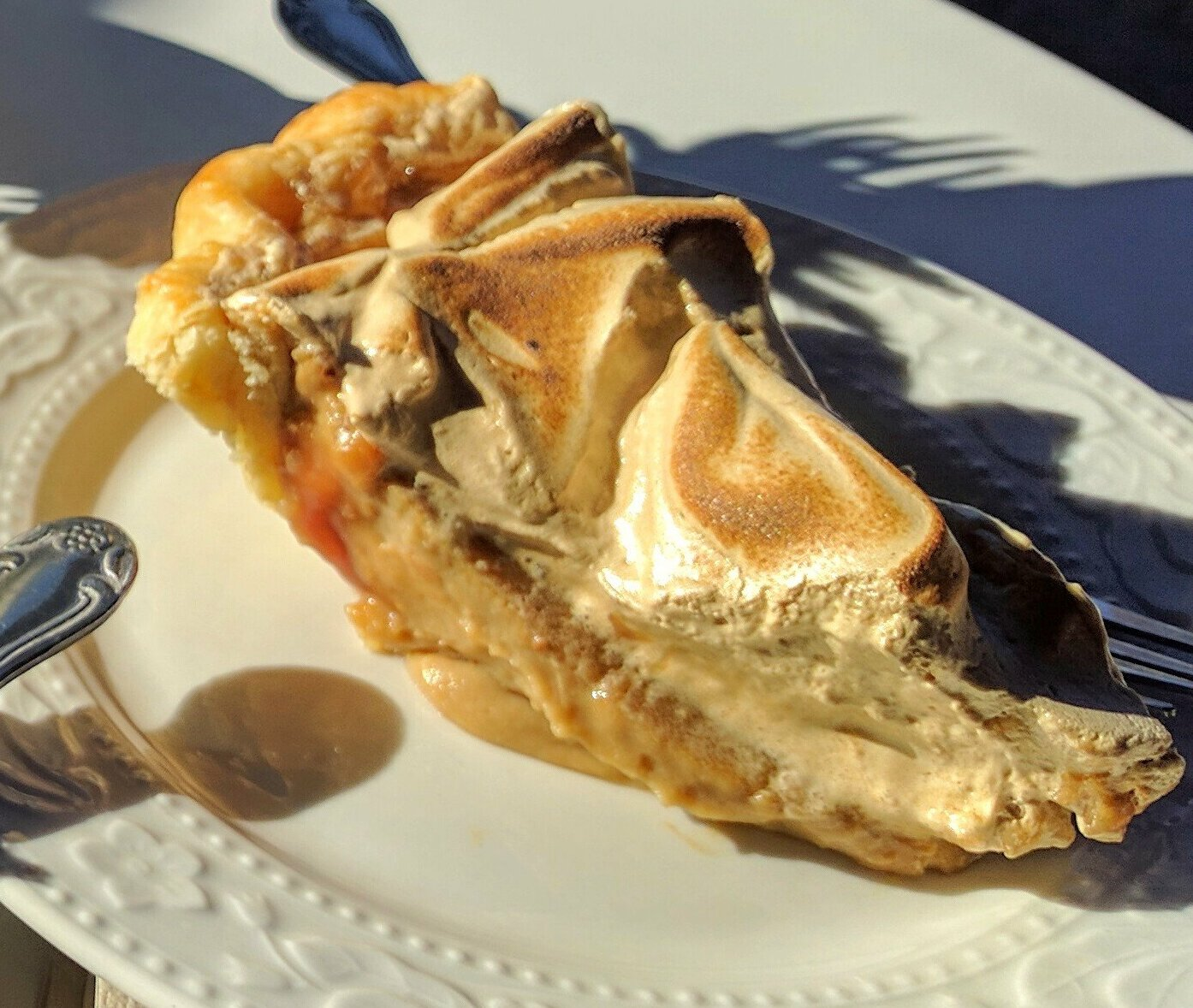
A slice of butterscotch pie

Butterscotch pie is a pie in American cuisine made by cooking brown sugar with egg yolks, corn starch, milk or cream, and butter to make a butterscotch custard pie filling which is topped with meringue and browned in the oven. Variations on the basic pie can be made with grated chocolate or orange rind which are sprinkled on the warm filling under the meringue topping.

== History ==
The pie is said to have originated at a Connersville, Indiana creamery in 1904 when Sarah Wheeler accidentally made butterscotch out of burnt custard and made a pie out of it for her sons. The recipe for this pie was published in the 1904 edition of a Methodist church cookbook, and helped her launch a chain of restaurants. The last Wheeler's restaurant closed in 1969, but according to the recipe published by the Indianapolis Star, attributed to Sarah Wheeler, the filling was made by stirring caramelized brown sugar into a mixture of flour and egg yolks, then adding butter and vanilla.

== Preparation ==
There are different ways to make the butterscotch filling. The egg yolks and milk can be added to the brown sugar and thickener, then butter and vanilla mixed in after the mixture has started to bubble, or the egg yolks can be added after the milk and sugar mixture has thickened. Another way to make the filling is to melt the butter first, and then add the other ingredients to the melted butter, first the sugar and cream, then scalded milk added in two portions with thickener. For the second version egg yolks are stirred in at the end. The pie filling can also be made with dark corn syrup, and evaporated milk can be used instead of milk or cream.
