= Cherry pie =

Pie with a cherry filling

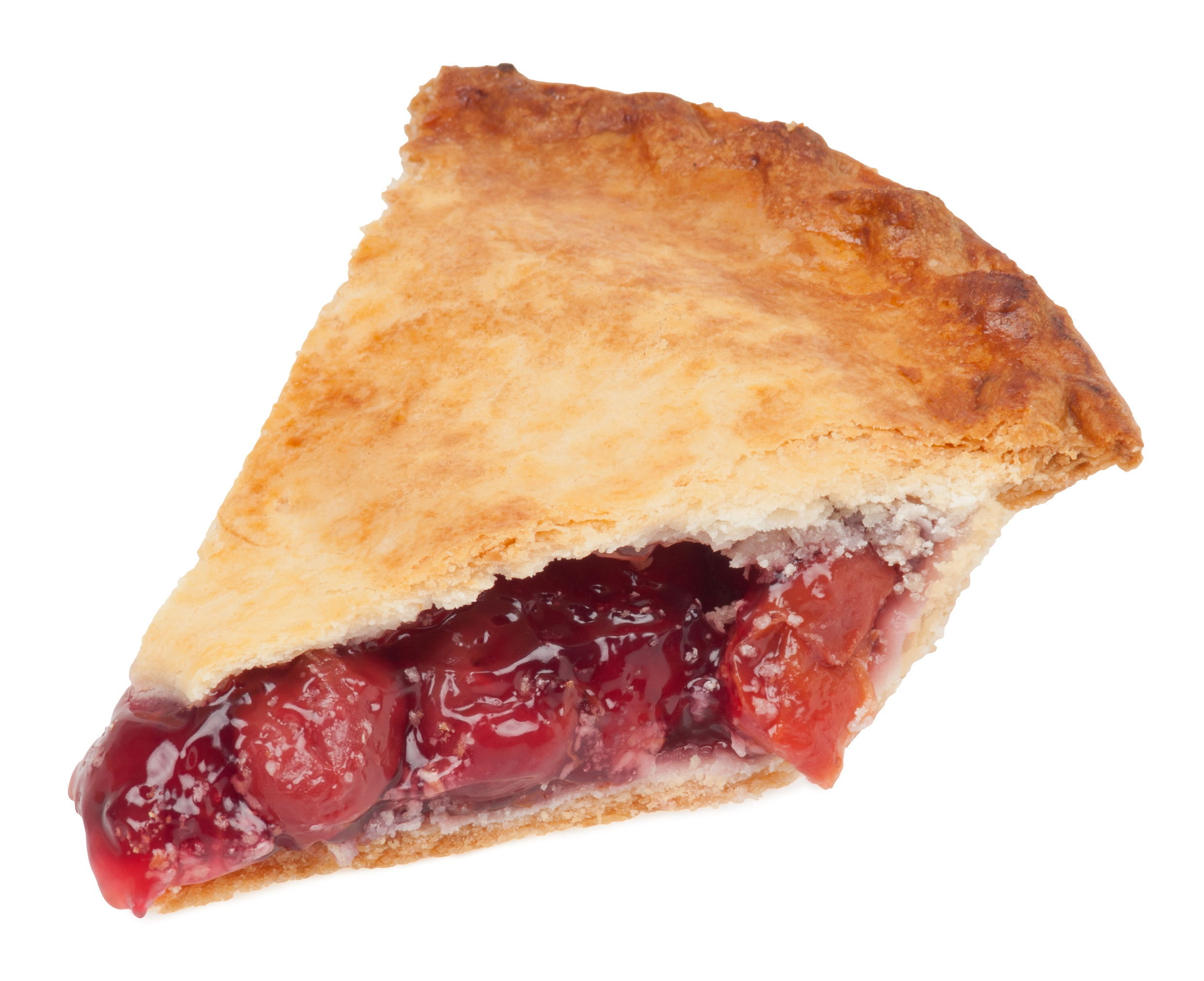
- Type: Pie
- Region or state: England
- Main ingredients: Pie crust, cherries, sugar, corn starch

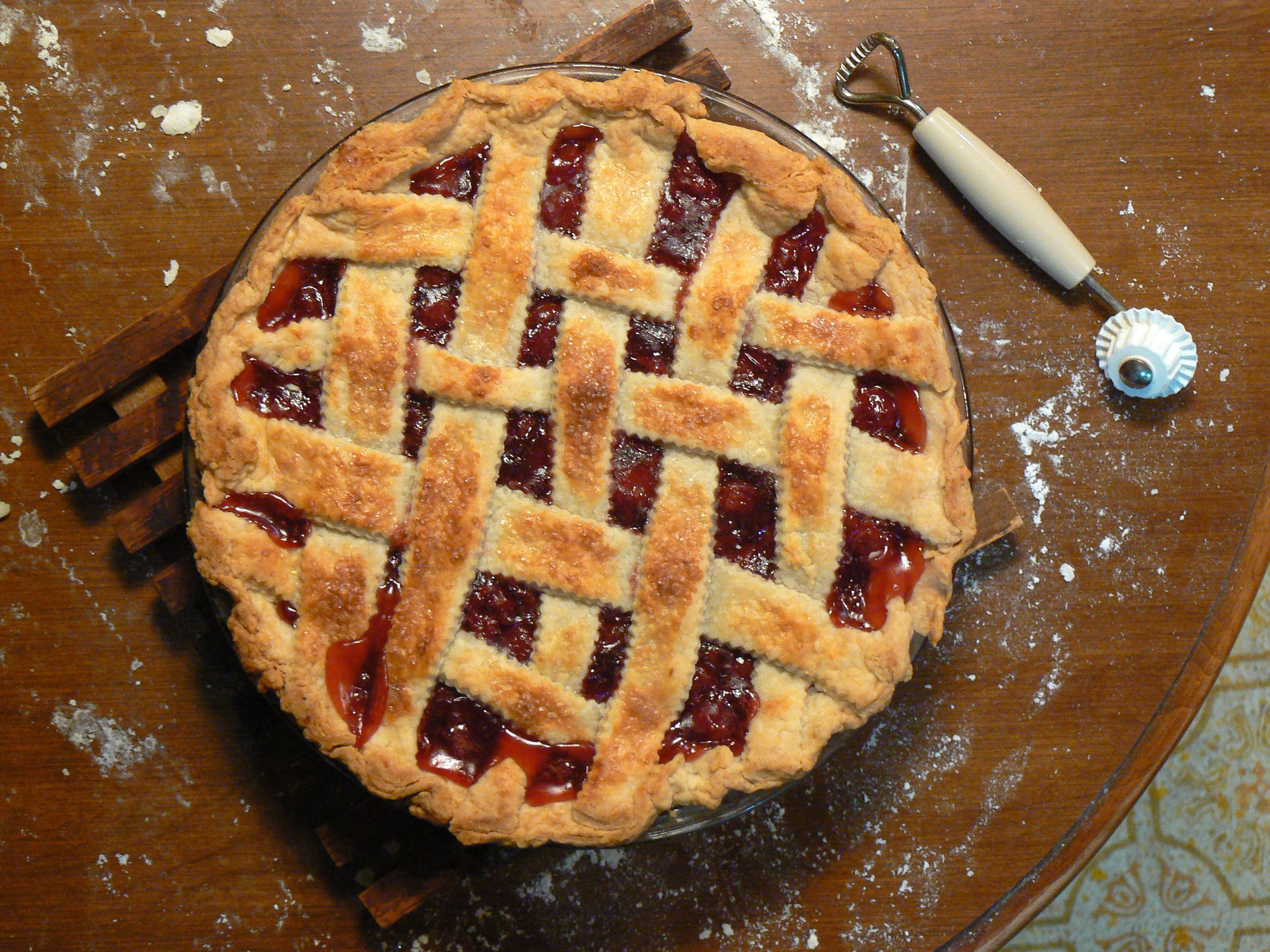
A homemade cherry pie with a lattice top crust

Cherry pie is a fruit pie baked with a cherry filling. Traditionally, it is made with sour cherries rather than sweet cherries. Morello cherries are one of the most common kinds of cherry used, but other varieties such as the black cherry may also be used.

The first cherry pie recorded was baked for Elizabeth I. Cherry pies are associated with Europe and North America, having been mentioned in the lyrics of American folk songs such as "Billy Boy". Due to the cherry harvest in midsummer coinciding with Canada Day on July 1 and America's Independence Day on July 4, cherry pie is often served on these holidays. It is also associated with the celebration of Washington's Birthday because of the legend of young Washington's honesty regarding the felling of a cherry tree.

Cherry pie is often served and eaten with whipped cream or ice cream. A common preparation tradition in the United States is to decorate the crust with ornate pastry patterns.

In the United States, 21 CFR 152.126 requires that frozen cherry pies contain at least 25% cherries, of which no more than 15% have blemishes. Artificial sweeteners are not permitted. In April 2019, the FDA proposed eliminating these standards. The regulations were removed in April 2024.

== See also ==
- Can She Bake a Cherry Pie?
- Donauwelle
- List of cherry dishes
- List of pies, tarts and flans
- Pie in American cuisine
