= Chess pie =

Dessert with flour, butter, sugar and eggs

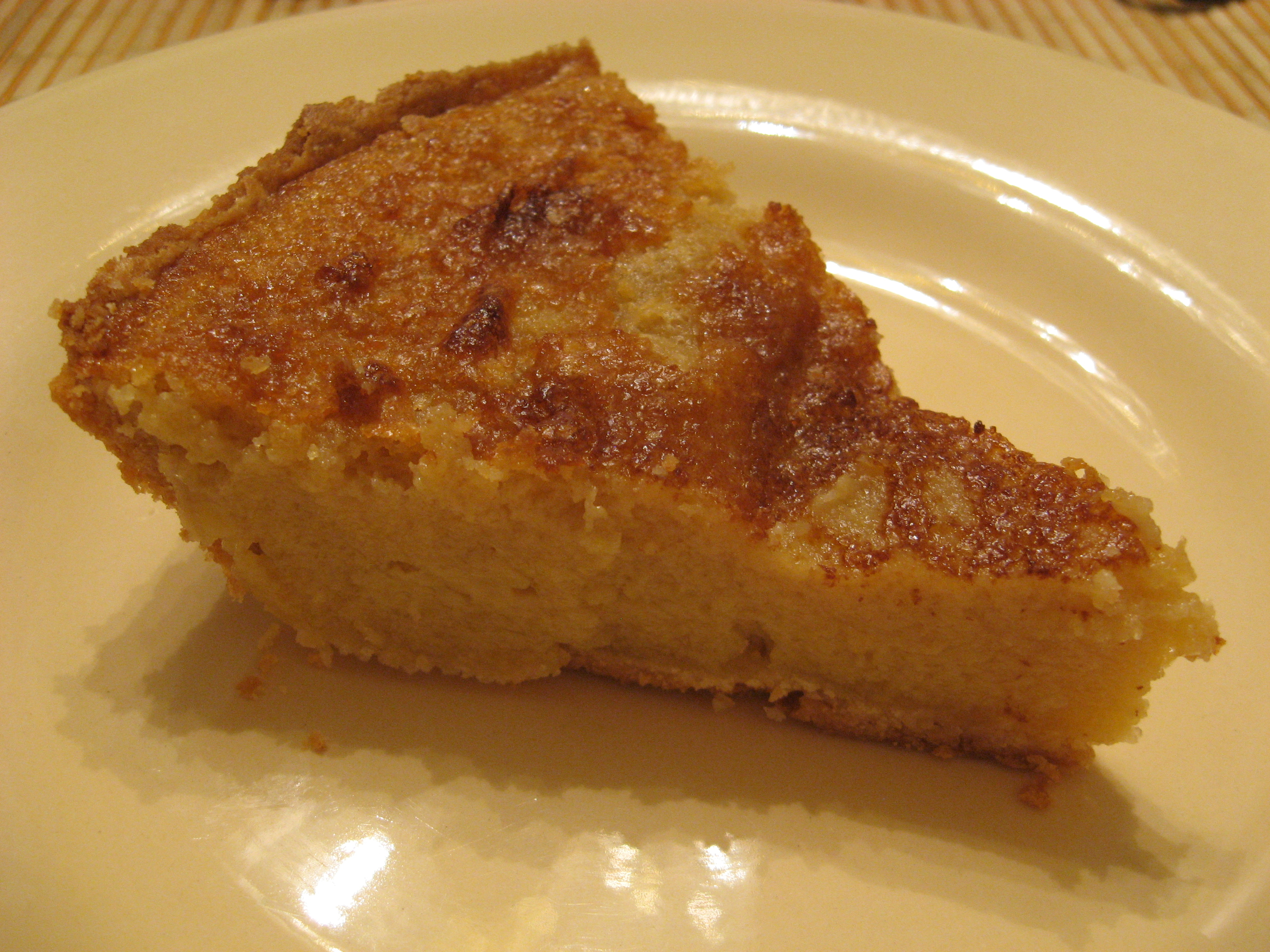
- A slice of vanilla buttermilk chess pie
- Type: Pie
- Main ingredients: Shortcrust pastry, eggs, butter, granulated sugar, vanilla, corn meal
- Variations: Lemon chess pie, vinegar pie

Chess pie is a dessert consisting of a pie crust with a filling composed mainly of flour, butter, sugar, eggs, and sometimes milk, characteristic of Southern United States cuisine.

Because the ingredients are inexpensive and available year round, it is considered one of the classic desperation pies.

Jefferson Davis pie, although similar, can also contain spices, nuts, or dried fruits and is usually topped with meringue.

Chess pie is the South's most searched-for Thanksgiving pie.

== Etymology ==
The origin of the name "chess pie" is not definitively known, although many theories have been proposed:

- It may have come from the English "chess-cake pie" (i.e., "cheese cake pie"), which became "chess pie" over time. The link probably comes from cook book author Marion W. Flexner in the April 1938 edition of The American Home, in her article "In Search of Chess Pie".
- It may have come from Pie-chest, the refrigerated cabinet that pies were sold in, with "chest" becoming "chess".
- That "chess pie" is an Eggcorn of "It's just pie" due to a misinterpretation of the pronunciation "It's jes' pie" in Southern American English, inasmuch as the pie was thought to be so simple any home cook with eggs, butter, and sugar would know what to do.

== History ==
Sweet Invention by food writer and former-chef Michael Krondl (2011) stated that it originates from the British "Transparent pudding". The pudding was made with custard and baked in a crust, and was renamed Chess Pie in the United States.

The First Ladies Cook Book (1965) attributes a recipe for "chess cakes" to Martha Washington, containing lemon and wine. The actual recipe in her cookbook, however, is for "cheesecakes without cheese curd" and uses currants.

Despite the pie's iconic status in the South, no recipe for "Chess Pie" appears in the first Southern cookbook, The Virginia Housewife (1824) by Mary Randolph. Food writer Jean Anderson characterizes the early recipes for transparent pudding, such as "Mary Randolph's Transparent Pudding" (containing no milk) in the 1825 edition are "for all intents and purposes chess pie".

The earliest recipe for Chess pie found by the food blogger, The Passionate Foodie, was in the October 1866 edition of The American Agriculturalist. The cookbook Buckeye Cookery—With Hints on Practical Housekeeping (1881) included a recipe submitted by Mrs. J. Carson of Glendale, Minnesota. The recipe maintained the basic custard ingredients of eggs, butter, and sugar, but the egg whites were whipped into a meringue and spread on top.

Recipes for "Chess Pie" made without milk can be found in early 20th century cookbooks.

Variations of the chess pie have included transparent pie, molasses pie, brown sugar pie, syrup pie, and vinegar pie.

== Composition ==
The basic chess pie recipe calls for the preparation of a single crust and a filling composed of flour, butter, sugar, eggs, and milk or condensed milk. Some variations call for the addition of cornmeal as a thickener. Many recipes call for an acid such as vinegar, buttermilk, or lemon juice.

Recipes dating from the 19th century typically include eggs, butter, sugar, and vinegar baked in a pie crust, with regional variations.

Flavor variations include lemon, coconut, and chocolate chess pie.

Some nut pies, including some pecan, fall under the category of chess pies.

Traditional pecan pie recipes do not include milk or condensed milk in the filling, and are typically regarded as a type of sugar pie similar to British treacle tart rather than a milk-containing custard.

== See also ==
- Buttermilk pie
- Chess cake
- List of pies, tarts and flans

== Bibliography ==
- Weinstein, Jay (2007). "Karo Syrup". In Smith, Andrew F. (ed.). The Oxford Companion to American Food and Drink. Oxford University Press. p. 339. ISBN 978-0-19-530796-2. OCLC 71833329.
