= Banana cream pie =

Cream pie made with bananas

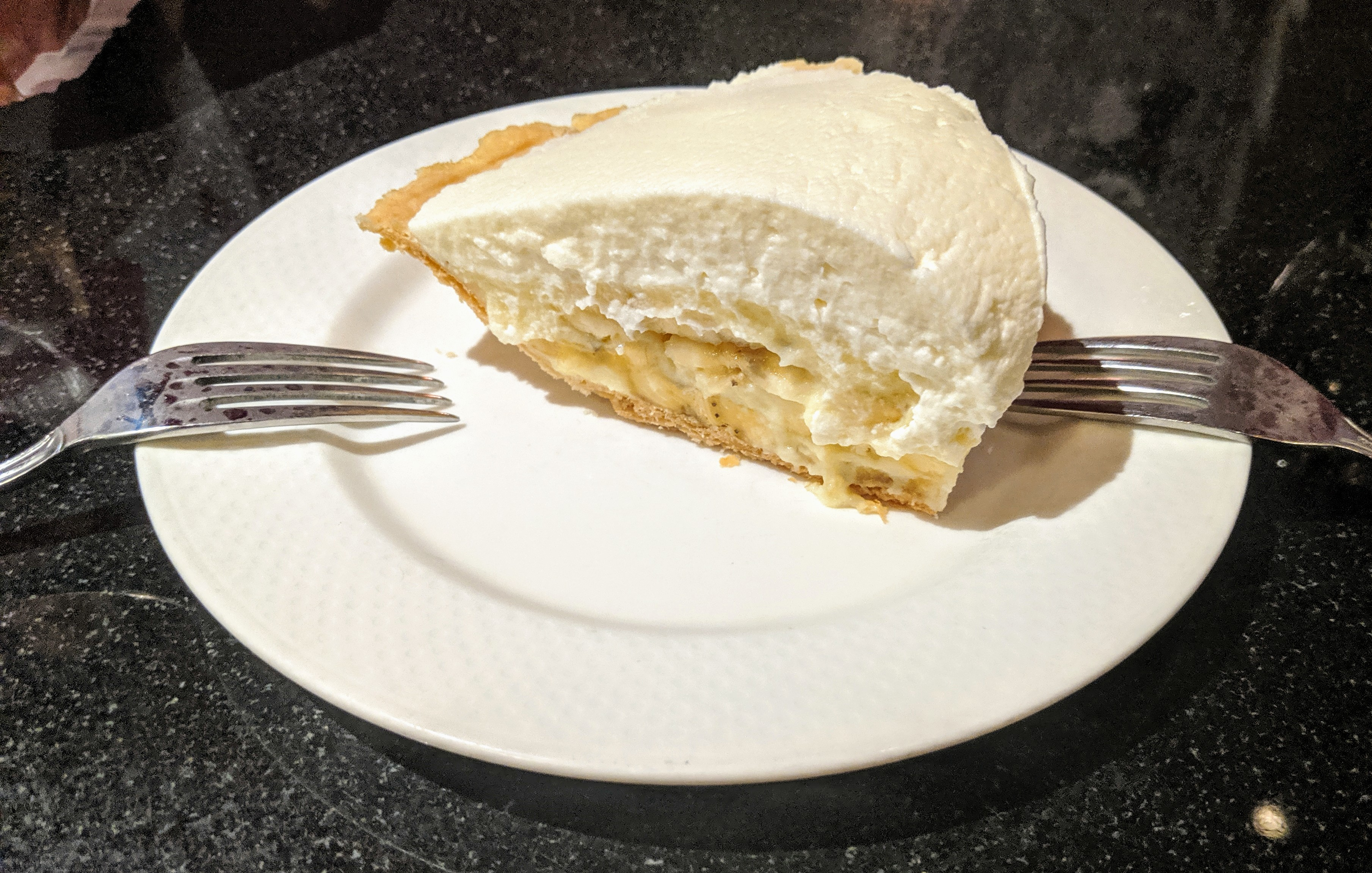
- Type: Cream pie
- Course: Dessert
- Place of origin: United States
- Main ingredients: Bananas, egg custard, whipped cream, pastry or cookie crust

Banana cream pie is an American dessert pie made with bananas, egg custard and whipped cream.

== History and background ==
Bananas "took the American market by storm in the 1880s" according to food historian Lynn Olver as quoted by the New York Times. According to the Oxford English Dictionary, the first use of 'cream pie' dates to the 1810s.

The dish dates to the end of the 19th century. A recipe for a banana pie, in which sliced bananas were placed into a baked pie crust and baked to soften the bananas, then topped with whipped cream, appeared in the 1901 Woman's Exchange Cook Book by Minnie Palmer. A 1906 recipe in The Blue Ribbon Cook Book calls for the addition of custard on top of the bananas with no further baking.

Classic recipes typically call for fresh bananas and custard in a prebaked pie crust which is then topped with whipped cream.

== Ingredients and assembly ==
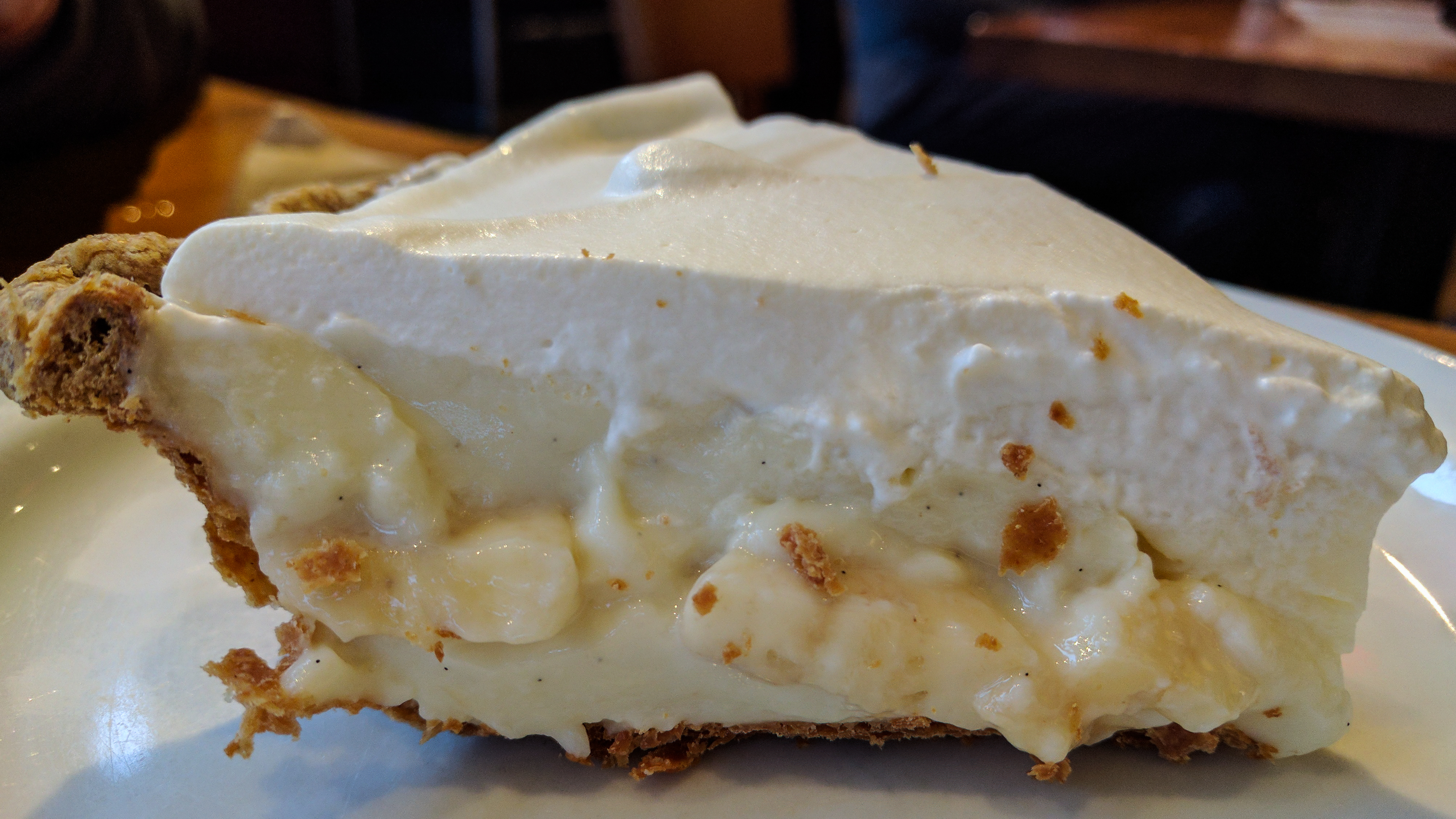
Close-up view of a slice of banana cream pie

Typically ingredients include a pastry crust which has been blind-baked or a graham cracker crust, which is then filled with bananas and custard or pastry cream (a cooked mixture of milk, sugar, vanilla, eggs, butter) and topped with crème fraiche or whipped cream.

== Popularity ==
The dish is known throughout the US but is most common in Midwestern cuisine and Southern cuisine. As of 2007 it was also popular in Los Angeles, according to the New York Times. According to the South Florida Reporter it was a favorite of US soldiers in 1951.

== Variations ==
- Banoffee pie, a British version which adds toffee
- Black bottom banana pie, in which a layer of chocolate is placed on the crust before adding the bananas

== Similar dishes ==
- Banana pudding, a dish in Southern cuisine in which bananas are layered over vanilla wafers, then topped with custard and often whipped cream.
