= List of largest restaurants =

This is a list of the largest restaurants by capacity.

== List ==
Name	City	Country	Image	Cuisine	Capacity	Ref
Bawabet Dimashq	Damascus	Syria		Syrian	6,014	
Pipa Yuan Shiweixian	Chongqing	China		Sichuan	5,851	
Royal Dragon Restaurant	Bangkok	Thailand		Thai	5,000	
West Lake Restaurant	Changsha	China		Hunan	5,000	
Madalosso	Curitiba	Brazil		Italian	4,630	
Golden Kinnaree Buffet	Kamala Beach	Thailand		Thai	4,000	
Hofbräu Wirtshaus Berlin	Berlin	Germany		Bavarian	4,000	
Andrés Carne de Res	Chía	Colombia		Colombian	3,300	
San Pedro Fish Market	San Pedro	United States		Seafood	3,000	
The Oasis on Lake Travis	Austin	United States		Tex-Mex	2,500	
Jumbo Kingdom	Hong Kong	Hong Kong		Cantonese	2,300	
Restaurante Arroyo	Mexico City	Mexico		Mexican	2,200	
Okryu-gwan	Pyongyang	North Korea		Korean	2,000	
Shady Maple Smorgasbord	East Earl	United States		Pennsylvania Dutch	2,000	
Columbia Restaurant	Tampa	United States		Spanish	1,700	
Emzara's Kitchen	Williamstown	United States		American	1,500	
Zehnder's	Frankenmuth	United States		American	1,500	
Phillips Crab House	Ocean City	United States		Seafood	1,400	
El Pinto Restaurant & Cantina	Albuquerque	United States		New Mexican	1,200	
U Fleků	Prague	Czech Republic		Czech	1,200	
Wright's Farm	Burrillville	United States		American	1,200	
Casa Bonita	Lakewood	United States		Mexican	1,100	
Rainforest Cafe Orlando	Orlando	United States		American	1,100	
Das Dutchman Essenhaus	Middlebury	United States		Pennsylvania Dutch	1,100	
1909 Taverne Moderne	Montreal	Canada		Canadian	1,500	
Bryant Park Grill	Manhattan	United States		American	1,000	
The Grand Summit	Crystal Mountain	United States		Pacific Northwest	1,000	
Ikea Hyderabad	Hyderabad	India		Indian	1,000	
Joe T. Garcia's	Fort Worth	United States		American	1,000	
La Felicità	Paris	France		Italian	1,000	
Sequoia DC	Washington, D.C.	United States		American	1,000	
Za Za Bazaar	Bristol	United Kingdom		Multicuisine	1,000	
Fast Eddie's Bon Air	Alton	United States		American	800	
The Varsity	Atlanta	United States		Fast food	800	
Cosmo	Croydon	United Kingdom		Asian cuisine	800	

== See also ==
- Lists of restaurants
