= San Pedro Fish Market =

Restaurant in California

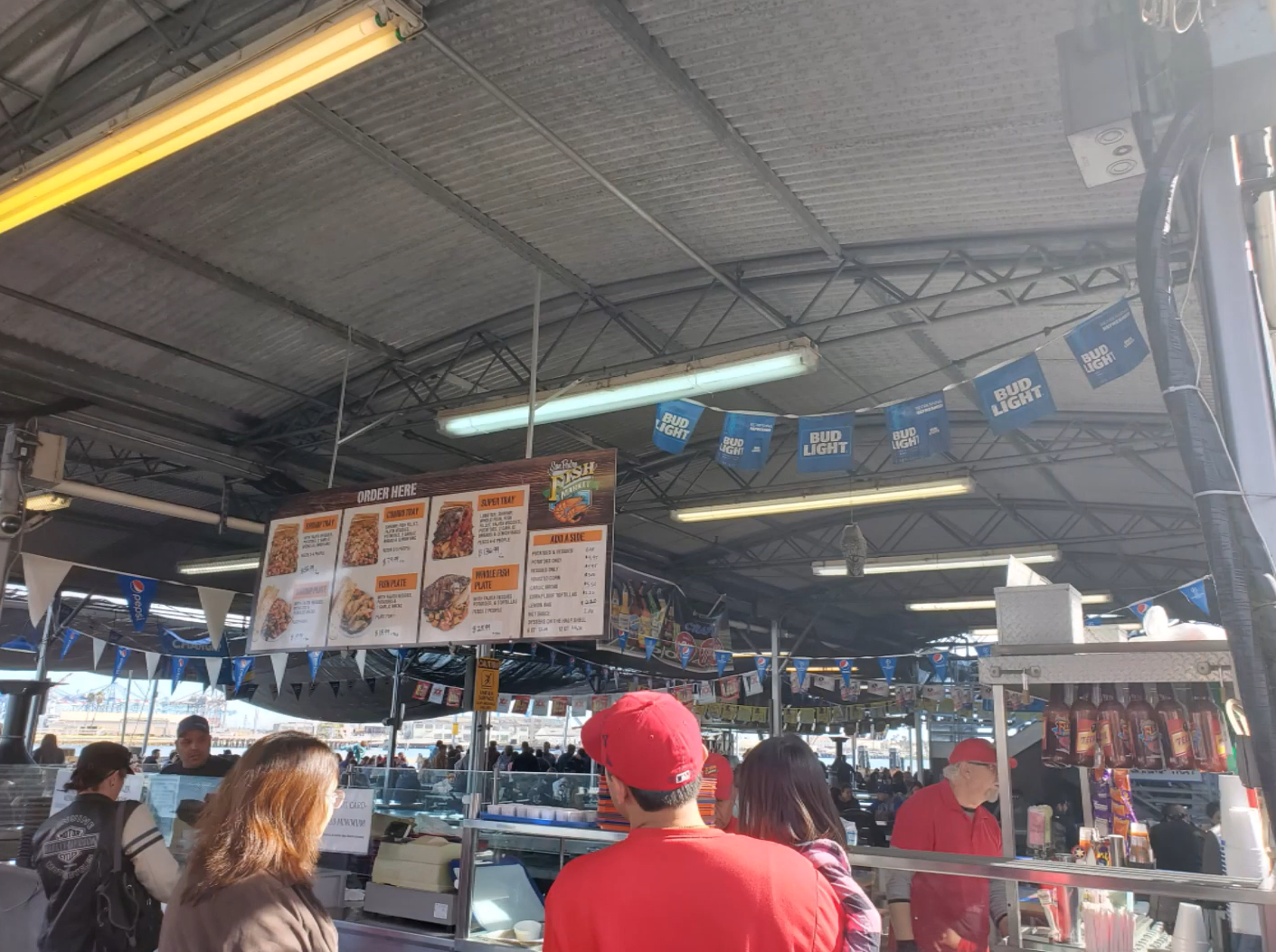
- The market in 2021

- Location within Southern Los Angeles Location within the Los Angeles metropolitan area Location within California Location within the United States

Restaurant information
- Established: 1956
- Owner: Ungaro family
- Food type: Seafood
- Location: 706 S Harbor Blvd, San Pedro, CA 90731
- Coordinates: 33.7377°N 118.2792°W
- Website: www.sanpedrofish.com

The San Pedro Fish Market is a fish market and restaurant in San Pedro, California. As of 2026, it is in a temporary location while construction on West Harbor, its future home, is being completed. When it is finished, it will be one of the largest restaurants in the United States, at 55,000 sq ft (5,100 m^{2}) and a capacity of 3,000.

== History ==
The market was founded in 1956 by Mackey Ungaro, an Italian immigrant, and was originally called Vista Seafood. In its beginnings, it was a small corner store on 9th and Meyler where Ungaro sold fresh fish from ice chests. He later put his son, Henry, and his nephew, Tommy Amalfitano, in charge when they were both 15 years old.

The market was moved to the waterfront in 1959, replacing Norms Landing Fish Market. Following their initial successes, Henry and Tommy introduced new menu items such as live crab and lobster, shrimp cocktails, and smoked fish. In 1972, as smoked seafood became more popular, the market acquired Shamrock Seafoods as a smoking and distribution facility. It later became a fast-casual chain called the San Pedro Fish Market Grille. A new building for the market was constructed in 1981, replacing the old Norms Landing one. It included a full-service restaurant and more space and was officially renamed to the San Pedro Fish Market. In 1990, the SPFM acquired the neighboring Crusty Crab Fish Market; it later completed an expansion that connected the two markets in 1998.

In 2015, the market launched a reality series on Amazon Prime Video called Kings of Fish. A second location in Long Beach was opened in 2020. During the renovation of Ports O' Call Village, which the market was formerly located at, to create West Harbor, it temporarily moved to another location nearby in 2023. In 2021, they had originally planned to move to another location entirely as not enough space was allocated for them, but committed to West Harbor in 2024, becoming an anchor tenant.
