= Carnival Magic (theme park) =

Theme park in Phuket, Thailand

Coordinates: 7.9581°N 98.2870°E

- Type: Private
- Industry: Entertainment
- Founded: 2022
- Headquarters: Kamala, Phuket, Thailand
- Key people: Kittikorn Kewkacha (Creator)
- Website: www.carnivalmagic.fun

Carnival Magic is a nighttime cultural theme park in Kamala, Phuket, Thailand. The park has a Thai carnival theme and opened in 2022.

== History ==
The project was first proposed in 2003, to be built on a site adjacent to Phuket FantaSea. Its development was delayed by several factors, including the 2004 Indian Ocean tsunami and the late-2000s financial crisis.

Construction resumed in 2016. The park was originally scheduled to open in 2020, but its opening was postponed because of the COVID-19 pandemic. It held a soft opening on 20 September 2022 and officially opened on 26 November 2022.

== Attractions ==
Carnival Magic's principal attraction is River Carnival, an indoor parade presentation staged in the River Palace, a purpose-built venue with seating for approximately 2,200 guests.

Other areas of the park include:

- Kingdom of Lights, an illuminated display area divided into themed zones;
- Bird of Paradise, a buffet restaurant with seating for up to 3,000 guests; and
- a shopping and entertainment street.

== Records and recognition ==
In 2022, Guinness World Records recognised Carnival Magic with nine records, including records relating to a theatre proscenium arch, parade float, outdoor chandelier, LED structures, papier-mâché sculpture, popcorn machine and illuminated vehicles.

The park was also included in Time magazine's World's Greatest Places of 2023 list.
