= Shoofly pie =

Molasses pie

Shoo-fly pie
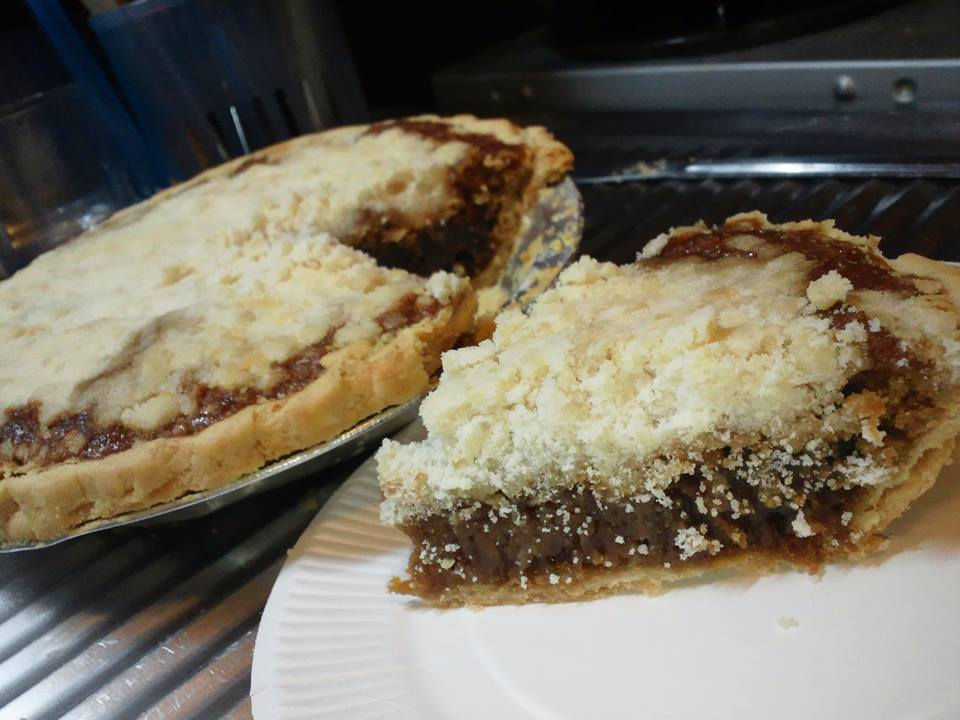
- Alternative names: Shoo-fly pie, molasses crumb pie, soda rivvel cake
- Type: Pie
- Place of origin: United States
- Region or state: Pennsylvania
- Main ingredients: Shortcrust pastry, molasses

Shoofly pie is a type of American pie made with molasses associated with Pennsylvania Dutch cuisine. While shoo-fly pie has been a staple of Moravian (Hussite), Mennonite, and Amish cuisine, most of the folktales concerning the pie are apocryphal, including the persistent legend that the name comes from flies being attracted to the sweet filling.

The name shoo-fly was borrowed from a brand of molasses that was popular in parts of the U.S. during the late 19th century. Possibly related to the Jenny Lind pie (a soft gingerbread pie), it may have originated among the Pennsylvania Dutch in the 1880s as molasses crumb cake, and is sometimes called molasses crumb pie. Traditionally it was not served as a dessert pie, but instead as a breakfast food with hot coffee. The modern form of shoo-fly pie as a crumb cake with filling in a pie crust was a post-Civil War innovation, when cast iron cookware and stoves made pie crust more feasible for home cooks.

== Description ==
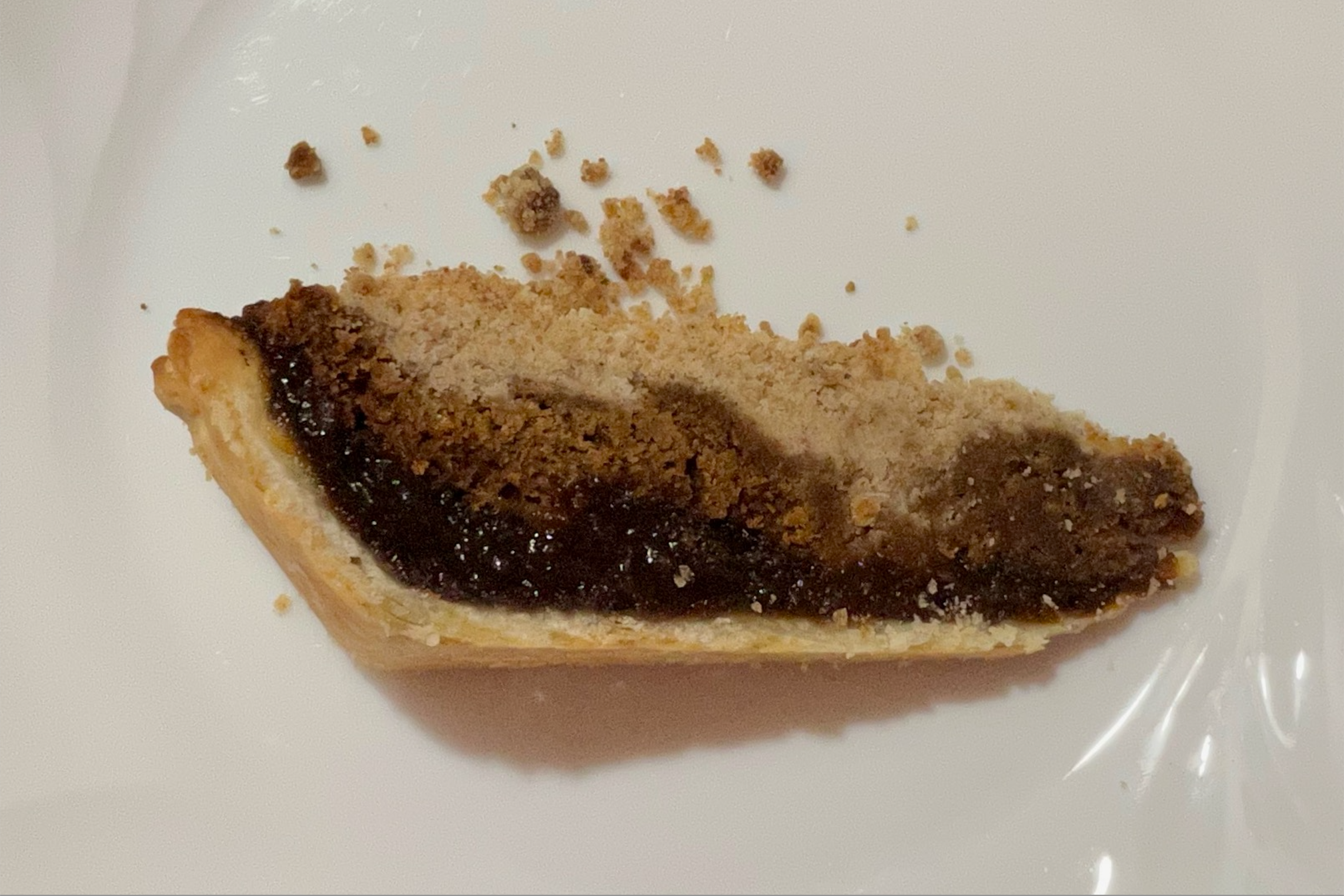
Slice of shoo-fly pie

Shoo-fly pie has been described as a crumb cake baked in a pie crust. The primary ingredients of the filling are molasses, brown sugar, and water. Serving the cake in pie crust made it easier for people to eat it with their hands in the 19th century.

It comes in two different versions: wet-bottom and dry-bottom. The dry-bottom version is baked until fully set and results in a more cake-like consistency throughout. The wet-bottom version is set like cake at the top where it was mixed in with the crumbs, but the very bottom is a stickier, gooier custard-like consistency. Different recipes for the wet and dry versions appeared in the early 20th century – the dry version was suitable for dunking in a cup of coffee.

== History ==
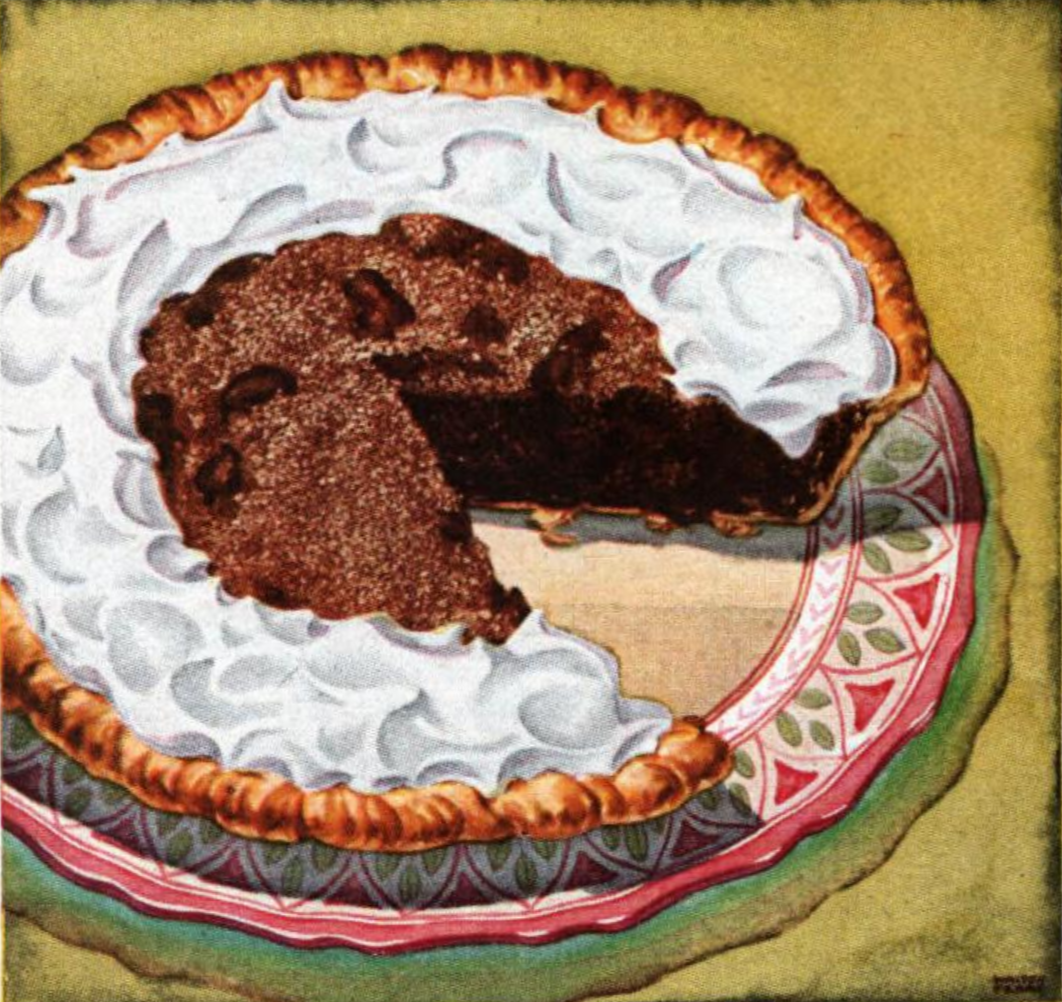
Illustration from the 1930s, appearing under the name Molasses Crumb Pie

Shoo-fly pie began as a crust-less molasses cake called centennial cake in 1876, created to celebrate the 100th anniversary of the signing of the Declaration of Independence in Philadelphia. There is no evidence of it being made before the American Civil War. In the 1880s, home bakers added a crust to make it easier to eat alongside a cup of coffee in the morning, without plates and forks. Precursors include Jenny Lind pie, a type of gingerbread cake that was named for the famed Swedish opera star, Jenny Lind, after her tour of America in the 1850s. Because shoo-fly pie traditionally contains molasses but no eggs, historians conclude that it was typically baked during the winter, when chickens laid fewer eggs and molasses could be stored in the cold weather without fear of it fermenting. The use of baking powder places its invention firmly after the Civil War, and not before the 1870s (when Pennsylvania Dutch bakers began using baking powder).

== Variations ==
A Montgomery pie is similar to a shoo-fly pie, except lemon juice is used in the bottom layer. Treacle tart is a pie with a filling made from light treacle.

== Name ==
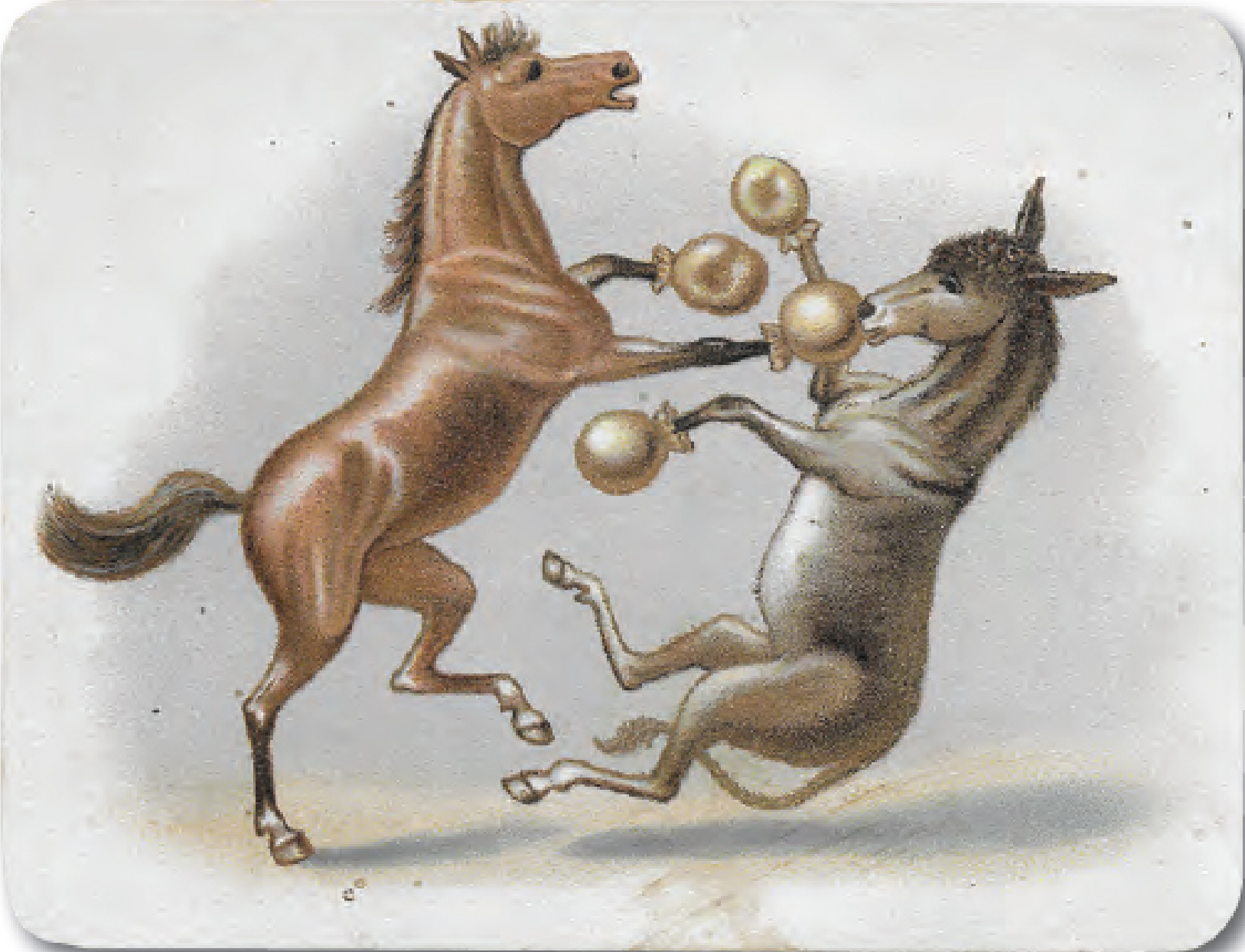
A trading card featuring Shoofly the Boxing Mule, released in Lancaster, Pennsylvania circa 1880

The modern name comes from a particular brand of molasses from Philadelphia, Shoo-fly Molasses. The name "shoo-fly pie" was used in the 1880s, but its first appearance in print was after World War I. The "Shoo-fly Molasses" brand was named after a popular circus animal that toured in Pennsylvania in the 19th century, "Shoo-fly the Boxing Mule". The mule, in turn, may have been named after a song that became popular half a century before: "Shoo Fly, Don't Bother Me". The pie is mentioned in the song "Shoo-Fly Pie and Apple Pan Dowdy", popularized by Dinah Shore in the 1940s.

In the Pennsylvania Dutch language, shoo-fly pie is called Melassich Riwwelboi or Melassichriwwelkuche (molasses crumb cake). Before its modern name became popular during the 20th century, it was molasses crumb pie or soda rivvel cake (rivels are lumps of food).

== See also ==
- Pie in American cuisine
