= Za Za Bazaar =

Restaurant in the UK

Coordinates: 51°27′1.3″N 2°35′54.7″W

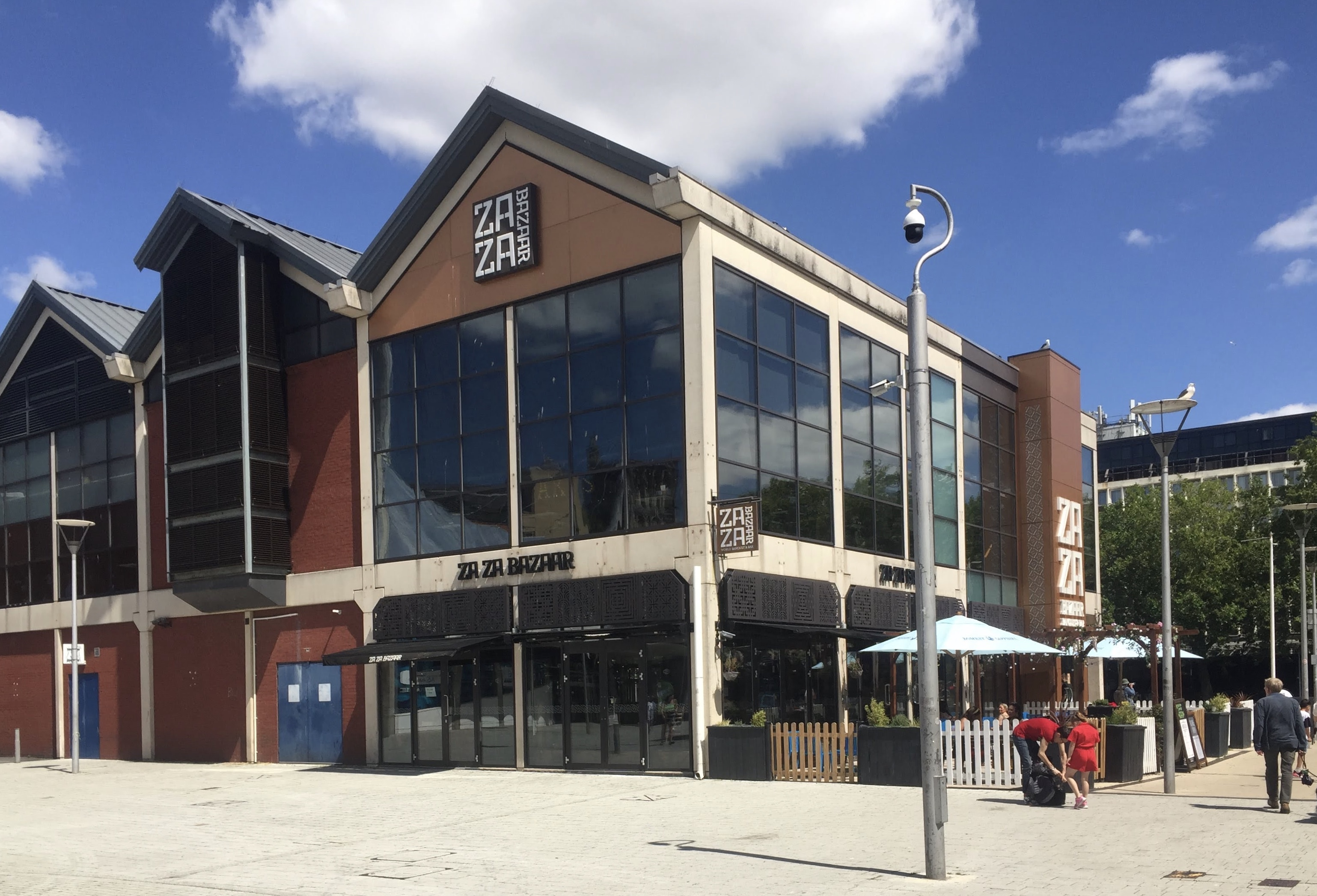
- Interactive map of Za Za Bazaar

Restaurant information
- Established: November 2011
- Head chef: Nitin Bhatnagar
- Location: Bristol, United Kingdom
- Website: zazabazaar.com

Za Za Bazaar World Banquet & Bar is a buffet restaurant in Bristol, England.

The restaurant, in Bristol's Harbourside area, opened just before Christmas in 2011. Its construction lasted thirteen weeks, and cost £3 million. It was billed as the largest restaurant in the United Kingdom, and seats 1,000 people, more than the then-current record of Croydon's Cosmo seating 800.

It was established with the plan to open another seven "super restaurants" across the United Kingdom, in an investment of £10m, that was rumoured to create 1,000 jobs in eighteen months. However, the expansion did not materialise, and a planned restaurant in Norwich has yet to be built. The food is split into the main categories of Far East, Tex Mex, European and Indian.

A second restaurant, situated in Newcastle City Centre, permanently closed in 2020 as a result of the COVID-19 pandemic.
