= Rivels =

Egg-based dumpling of Germanic origin

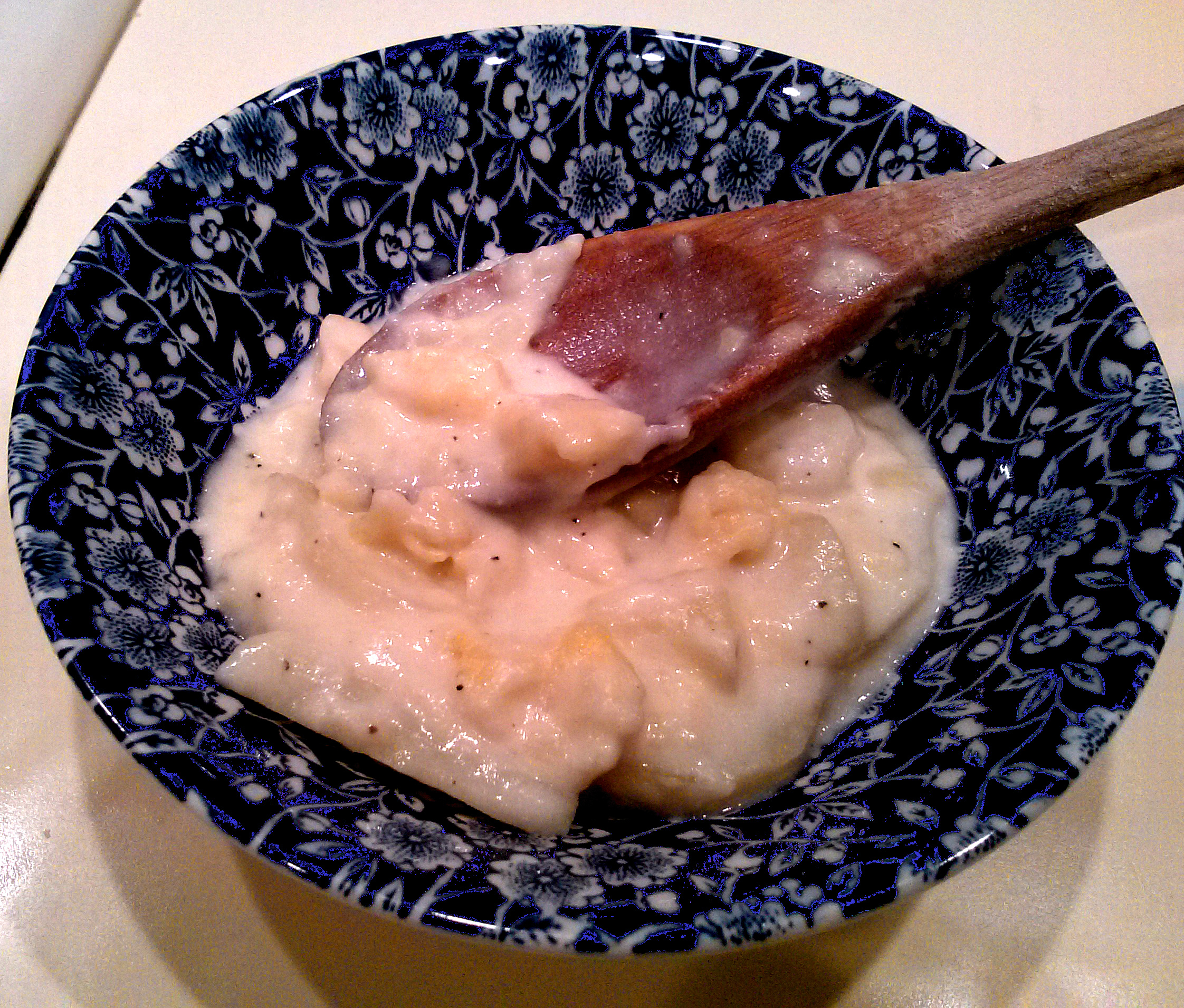
- Rivels in Cream of Potato Soup; two of the yellow-ish rivels can be seen most clearly on the wooden spoon.
- Main ingredients: Eggs, wheat flour

Rivels are an ingredient in some types of soup, often a chicken-based soup (archetypically chicken corn soup) or potato soup. Rivels are common in Pennsylvania Dutch cooking. They are composed primarily of egg and wheat flour, which is cut together to create small dumpling-like pieces.

== See also ==
- Chicken and dumplings
