= Phuket FantaSea =

Theme park in Phuket, Thailand

Coordinates: 7.9558°N 98.2868°E

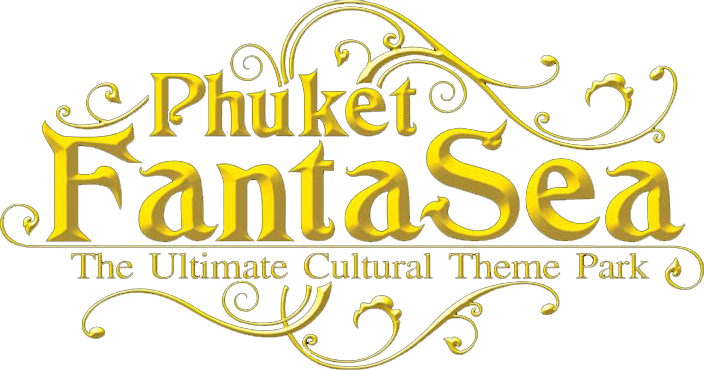
- The ultimate cultural theme park

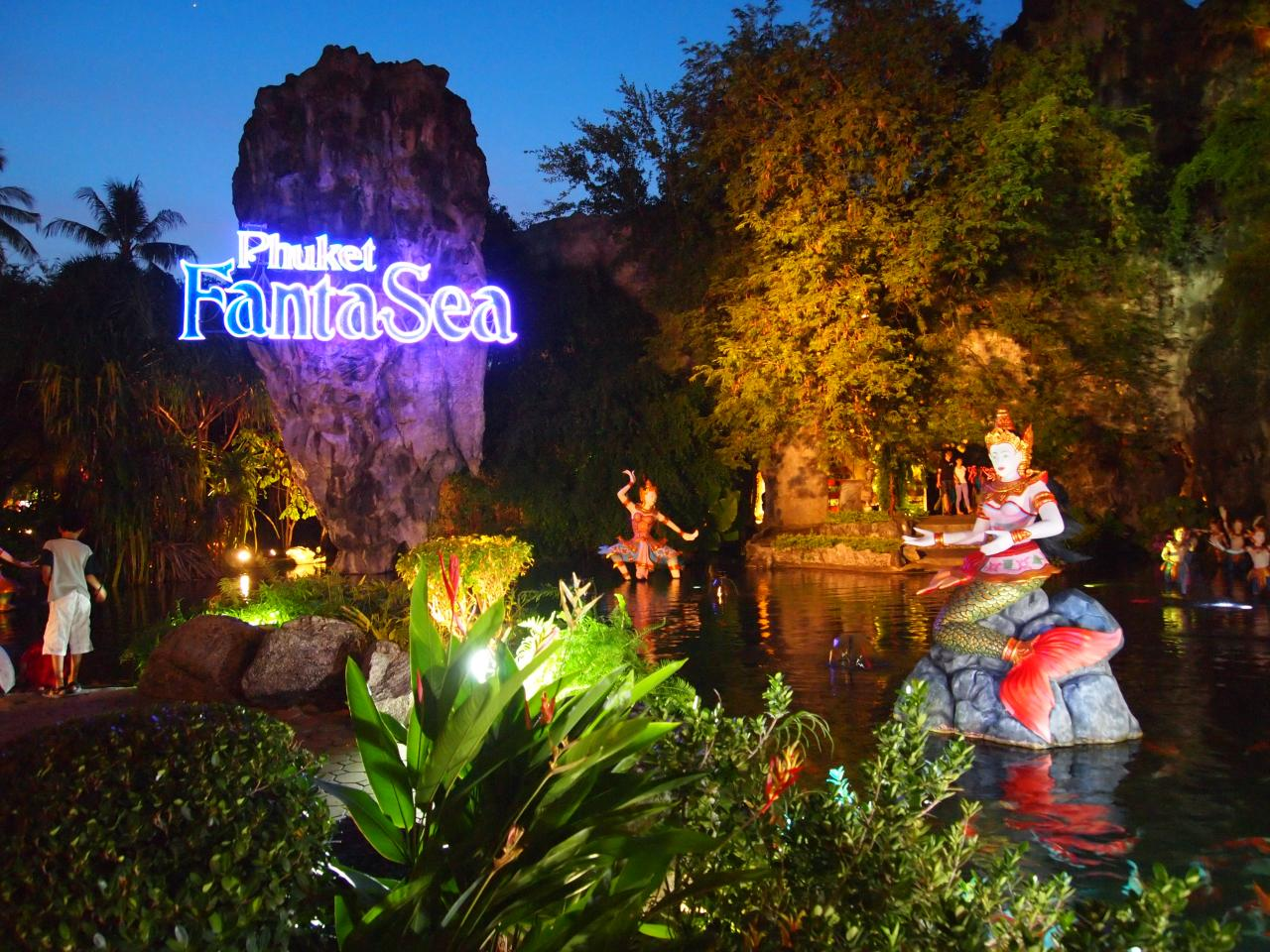
- The park in December 2011
- Headquarters: Kamala Beach, Phuket, Thailand
- Area served: 60 acres (20 ha)
- Owner: Phuket FantaSea Public Company Limited
- Website: www.phuket-fantasea.com

Phuket FantaSea is a Thai nighttime cultural theme park located on the island of Phuket, in the south of the country. The park covers an area of 60 acres (20 ha) and includes a Thai culture theatrical show, a theme buffet restaurant, and a shopping street. The park was created at a cost of over THB 3,500 million (US$100 million) and was opened to the public on 20 December 1998.

== Contents ==
=== Fantasy of a Kingdom' show ===
A Thai cultural show infused with illusion techniques and special effects. The show is approximately 70 minutes in duration and performed inside a purpose-built theater called 'Palace of the Elephants', a reproduction of a Sukhothai era stone elephant palace. Taking up an area of approximately 10 rai (4 acres) and 3 floors, it has a seating capacity of 3,000.

== Golden Kinnaree buffet restaurant ==
The Golden Kinnaree Buffet Restaurant is designed in an Ayutthaya-era architectural style, occupying an area of 5,220 m2 (approximately 1.3 acres), with a capacity of 4,000 seated guests and is one of the largest buffet restaurants in the world.

== Festival Village shopping street ==
Festival Village is a street with a variety of shops. There are also a game town, an a la carte restaurant, a fast food eatery and bars.
