= Ham loaf =

Baked meat dish

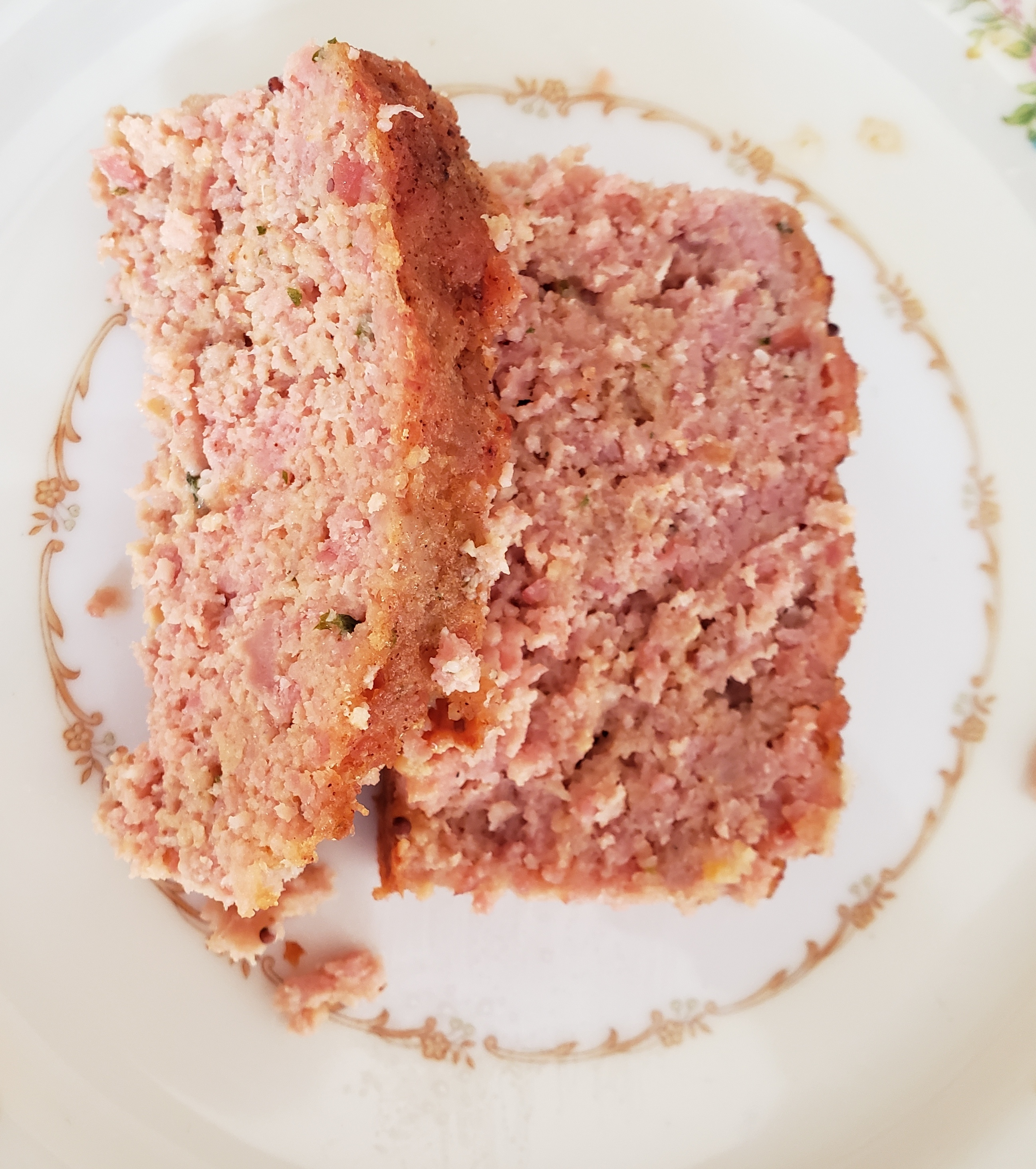
Served slices of hamloaf

Ham loaf or hamloaf is a baked meat dish, similar to meatloaf, made of ground ham and ground pork and combined with other ingredients to form a loaf-like shape. Distinct in color and taste from meatloaf, ham loaf is often baked with a sweet glaze, often consisting of brown sugar, molasses, pineapples, or cherries. In Pennsylvania, ham loaf is sometimes served with a sauce consisting of vinegar, mustard, and brown sugar. Eggs, milk, often evaporated, and some type of filling ingredient, bread or cracker crumbs, are used to create the loaf form.

Attributed as a traditional Pennsylvania Dutch cuisine, ham loaf is eaten throughout Pennsylvania, Ohio, Kentucky, Indiana, and many other Midwest states and is often served on special occasions, including Easter.
