= Spudnut Shops =

American franchised doughnut stores

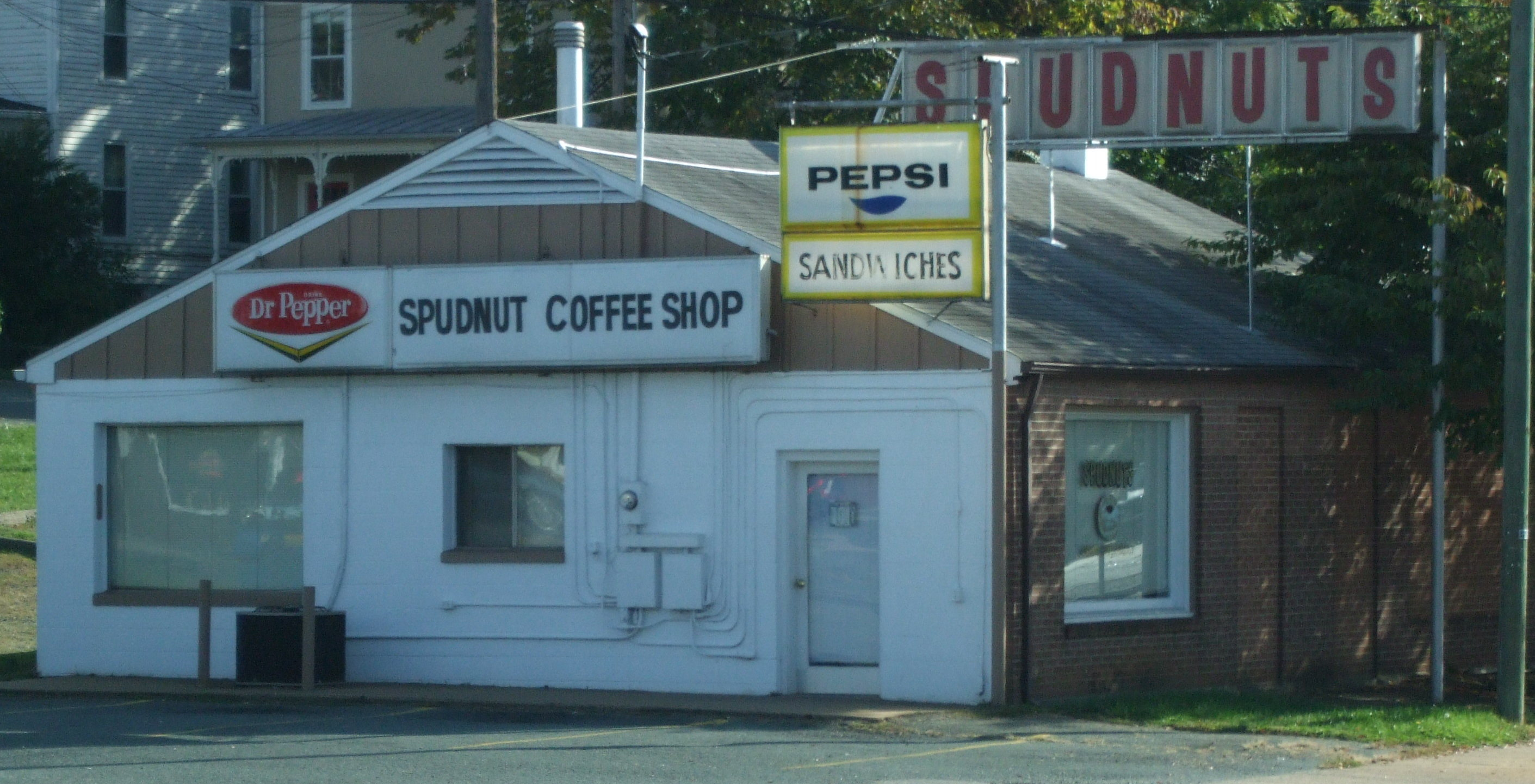
Spudnuts Coffee Shop, in Charlottesville, Virginia, which closed in 2016

Spudnut Shops were American franchised stores selling donuts made with potato flour called Spudnuts. The original recipe is based on a folk recipe that traces back to Germany.

The company was founded in 1940 and had 315 franchise stores by 1968. The parent company no longer exists, but some independent stores remain.

== History ==
After brothers Al and Bob Pelton of Salt Lake City ate potato-based doughnuts in Germany, they tried a number of things, from wheat dough that was flavored with potato water to using mashed potatoes, before creating a dry potato mix that not only worked for them but made it possible to franchise the concept. They coined the word "spudnut", and went into business in 1940.

In 1946, the company began establishing a nationwide chain of franchised Spudnut Shops. In 1948, one new franchisee opened a store after paying $50 (approx. $1,095 in 2024 dollars) plus the cost of 100 sacks of spudnut flour. By 1952, when the Peltons were on the cover of the April 1952 edition of Mechanix Illustrated (“Their Potatoes Make Dough”), a franchise cost $1,750, plus equipment and other costs, for an initial investment of about $5,000 (approx. $109,550 in 2024 dollars).

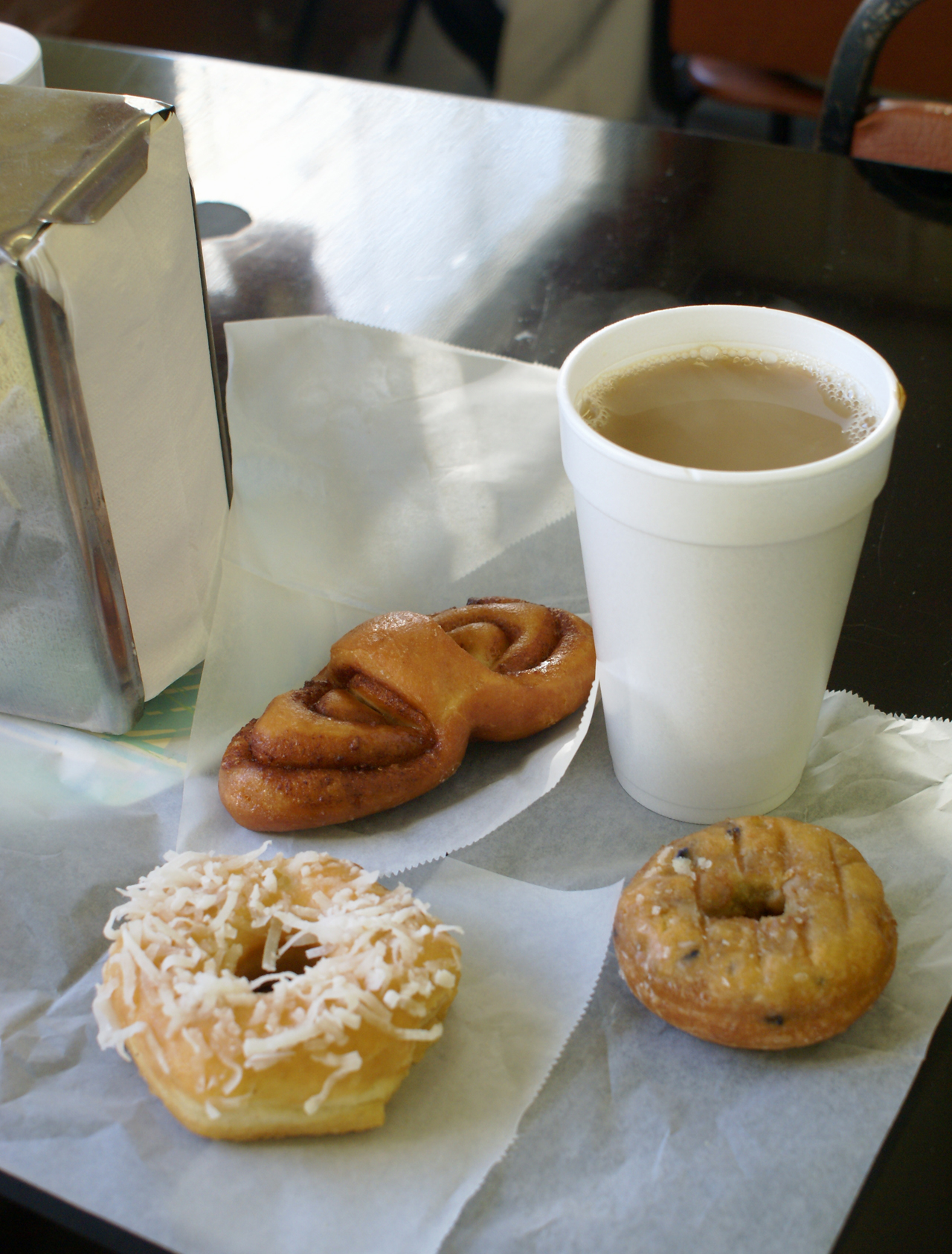
A sampler of potato doughnuts from Spudnuts Coffee Shop in Charlottesville, Virginia

By 1948, over 200 Spudnut Shops had sprung up across the USA. Spudnuts were advertised widely, with the slogan "Coast to coast... Alaska to Mexico". The cartoon character "Mr. Spudnut" frequently appeared in advertisements, restaurants, and even in parades. By mid-1949, the number was over 225, in 31 states. By 1954, there were more than 300 shops in 38 states.

In 1964, Spudnut shops were selling about 400,000 spudnut doughnuts per day. That year, the company announced that it had successfully designed a process of flash freezing its dough, and announced that it planned to increase its distribution centers. At that time, there were six metropolitan franchise dealers who made fresh dough for distribution to shops that did not want to make their own dough from the dry mix sold by the company.

In 1968, the Pelton brothers retired, selling their company, Spudnut Industries Inc., to National Oven Products, Inc., of Washington state, a wholly owned subsidiary of Pace Industries, based in Vancouver, British Columbia. The annual sales of Spudnut Industries was $2 million. The sale price was $550,000, payable over five years, plus 20,000 shares of Pace Industries (worth about $175,000). At the time, there were 315 franchise holders, with combined annual sales of $25 million, making it the largest doughnut franchise in the United States. In 1973, Pace sold the company, which it had kept as a separate entity, together with National Oven Products, for $1.3 million, to Dakota Bake-N-Serv, headquartered in Jamestown, North Dakota. Within a year of the purchase, the new parent company remodeled the Spudnut headquarters in Salt Lake City, and retired "Mr. Spudnut", the company symbol, replacing him with a design showing a spudnut with a bite taken out of it. The mix for the company's signature product continued to be produced at the company plant in Salt Lake City, available as 50 pound bags of dry ingredients or as frozen dough.

However, the owner of Dakota Bake-N-Serv became involved in a huge, proposed marina development in the Sacramento River Delta, selling all of his stock to a promoter in exchange for tax-free bond notes that proved worthless. When the promoter was convicted on several charges of fraud and conspiracy in 1979, it was the end of Spudnuts as a chain. The parent company was closed, leaving all the franchisees to fend for themselves. By late 1989, there were only 28 franchise stores open.

The Spudnuts brand has not disappeared completely, with some 35 Spudnut Shops in nine states still open. A single outlet in Canada was taken over by a bakery shop in 2009, but still bakes the treat once a week. Over the history of Spudnuts, there were over 600 stores around the U.S., Canada, and Mexico. In 1975, there were 170 Spudnut outlets in Japan.

In January 2011, Sarah Palin brought national attention to the business in a televised interview refuting President Barack Obama's 2011 State of the Union address calling for the federal government to create a 'Sputnik moment'. She asserted the need for a 'Spudnuts moment' citing the success of small businesses in a free economy without federal economic interference.

== Ingredients ==
With the closure of the parent company in the 1980s, the original Pelton mix was no longer available. Existing shops had to create their own recipes.

In 2008, Douglas E. Bagley purportedly acquired an authentic Spudnut ingredient list from Will Bellar, who was the executive vice president and general manager of Spudnut International from 1970 to 1975.

On August 16, 2012, Douglas E. Bagley and others were enjoined in federal court from using the federally registered SPUDNUTS trademark without a license by the trademark owner, MP-OTHA Corporation of Galesburg, Illinois, per stipulated injunction. In October 2015, Douglas E. Bagley and MP-OTHA Corp settled their dispute which allows Douglas Bagley to continue to sell the same donut mix however he will not use the names spudnut, spudnuts or spuddos and will now be selling this mix under the name potadonut.

== See also ==
- List of doughnut shops
