= Shady Maple Smorgasbord =

Buffet restaurant in Pennsylvania

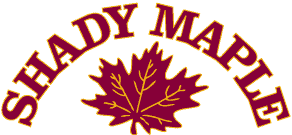
- Interactive map of Shady Maple Smorgasbord

Restaurant information
- Established: 1985; 41 years ago
- Owner: Phil Weaver (as of 2025)
- Location: 129 Toddy Drive, East Earl Township, Lancaster County, Pennsylvania, 17519, United States
- Coordinates: 40.118551°N 76.032285°W
- Website: www.shady-maple.com

The Shady Maple Smorgasbord is a buffet restaurant located in East Earl, Pennsylvania. It is the largest buffet in North America.

== History ==
The Shady Maple began as a farm stand run by the Martin family. The name came from its location in the shade of a large maple tree. The farm stand evolved under the next generation of family ownership into a small IGA, Inc., supermarket by 1970. A cafeteria with seating for 100 was added to the supermarket in 1982. This was later expanded into a smorgasbord (buffet) with 300 seats. Subsequent expansions moved the restaurant to its own building and seating expanded to 1,200.

== Food ==
The Shady Maple primarily serves the cuisine of the Pennsylvania Dutch. It serves breakfast, lunch, and dinner.

== Facility ==
The buffet is 200 feet (61 m) long, and together with the gift shop, the store covers 111,000 square feet (10,300 m^{2}).

The building also serves as a polling place during elections.

== Awards and recognition ==
In 2024, USA Today rated Shady Maple Smorgasbord the best buffet in the country.

== See also ==
- Miller's Smorgasbord
