= Royal Dragon Restaurant =

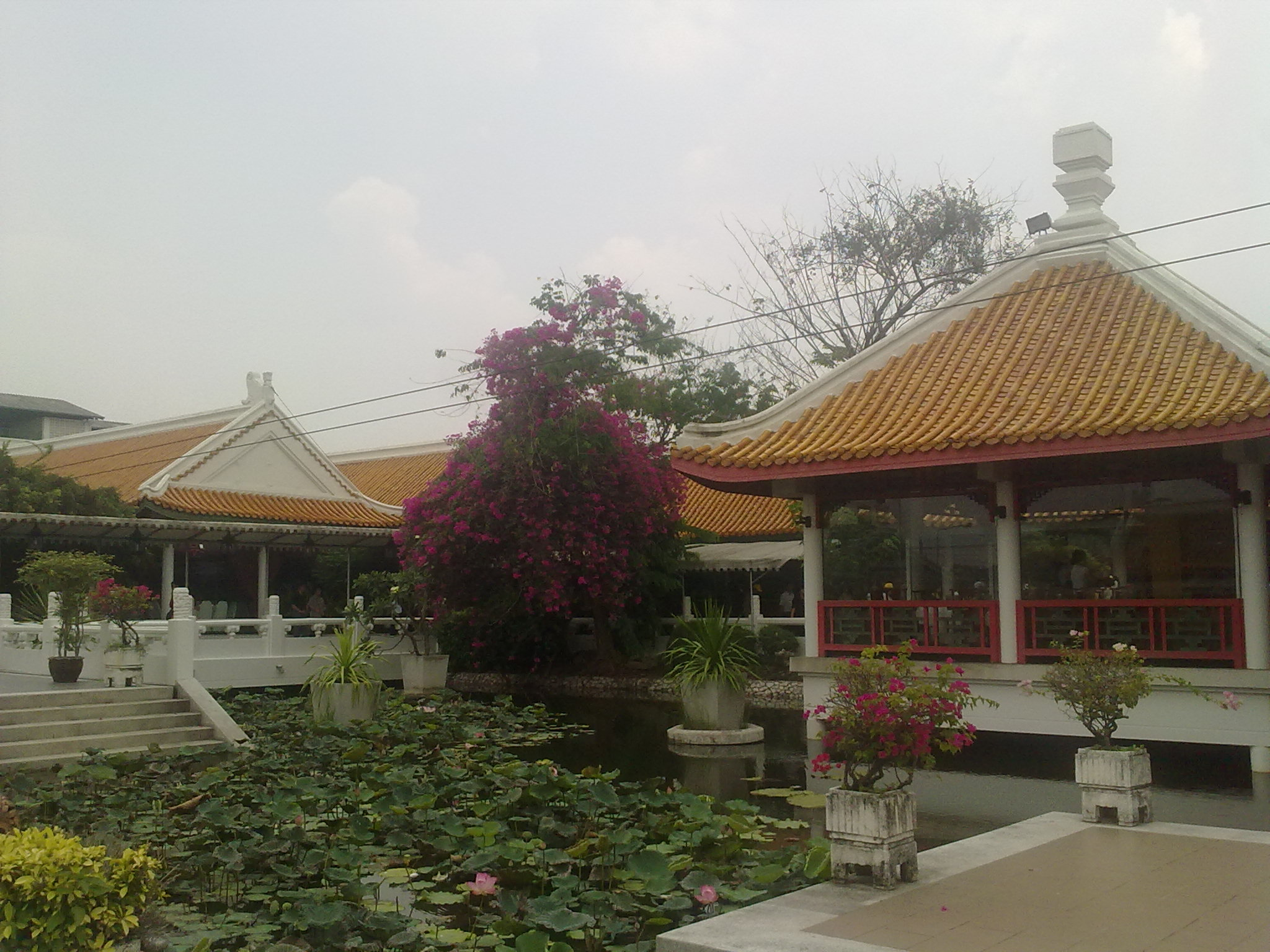
- Exterior of the restaurant
- Interactive map of Royal Dragon Restaurant

Restaurant information
- Location: Bangkok, Thailand
- Coordinates: 13.668856°N 100.613926°E

The Royal Dragon Restaurant (Thai: มังกรหลวง) of Bangkok, Thailand was recorded in Guinness World Records as the world's largest restaurant in 1992. The 8.35 acres (33,800 m^{2}) restaurant had seating for 5,000 diners. It was surpassed in capacity by the current record holder, the Bawabet Dimashq (Damascus Gate) Restaurant, which opened in 2002 in Damascus, Syria, with just over 6,000 seats. The restaurant closed around 2022 and was occupied by HomePro.

== Menu ==
Although the Royal Dragon billed itself as a seafood restaurant, it served more than 1,000 Thai, Chinese, Japanese, and Western-style dishes.

== See also ==
- List of seafood restaurants
- List of Thai restaurants
