= Bawabet Dimashq =

Restaurant in Damascus, Syria

Coordinates: 33°26′23″N 36°24′24″E

- Interactive map of Bawabet Dimashq

Restaurant information
- Owner: Shaker al Samman
- Food type: Indian, Chinese, Arab, Iranian, Middle Eastern, and Syrian Cuisine
- Location: Damascus, Syria
- Seating capacity: 6,014

The Bawabet Dimashq (Arabic: بوابة دمشق, romanized: Bawābat Dimashq, lit. 'Damascus Gate') is a family owned restaurant in Damascus, Syria, that opened in 2002. It is the largest restaurant in the world, as listed by the Guinness World Records.

The structure cost $40 million to construct and is owned by Shaker al Samman. The restaurant has a 54,000 m^{2} (580,000 sq ft) dining area, 2,500 m^{2} (27,000 sq ft) kitchen, can serve 6,014 people, and during peak operation, 1,800 staff are employed. The restaurant has features such as waterfalls, fountains, replicas of archaeological ruins of Syria, and six culinary themed sections for Indian, Chinese, Arab, Iranian, Middle Eastern, and Syrian cuisine. The restaurant received the title as the largest restaurant in the world by the Guinness World Records on May 29, 2008, taking the title from the Mang Gorn Luang or Royal Dragon restaurant in Bangkok, Thailand, which caters to up to 5,000 diners.

It was closed due to being heavily damaged in 2011 due to the Syrian civil war but was rebuilt and reopened in 2018.

ANNA newsreel from 2014 shows the abandoned compound during the Syrian civil war in 2014.

== See also ==
- Theme restaurant
