= Potato doughnut =

Sweet, potato-based treat

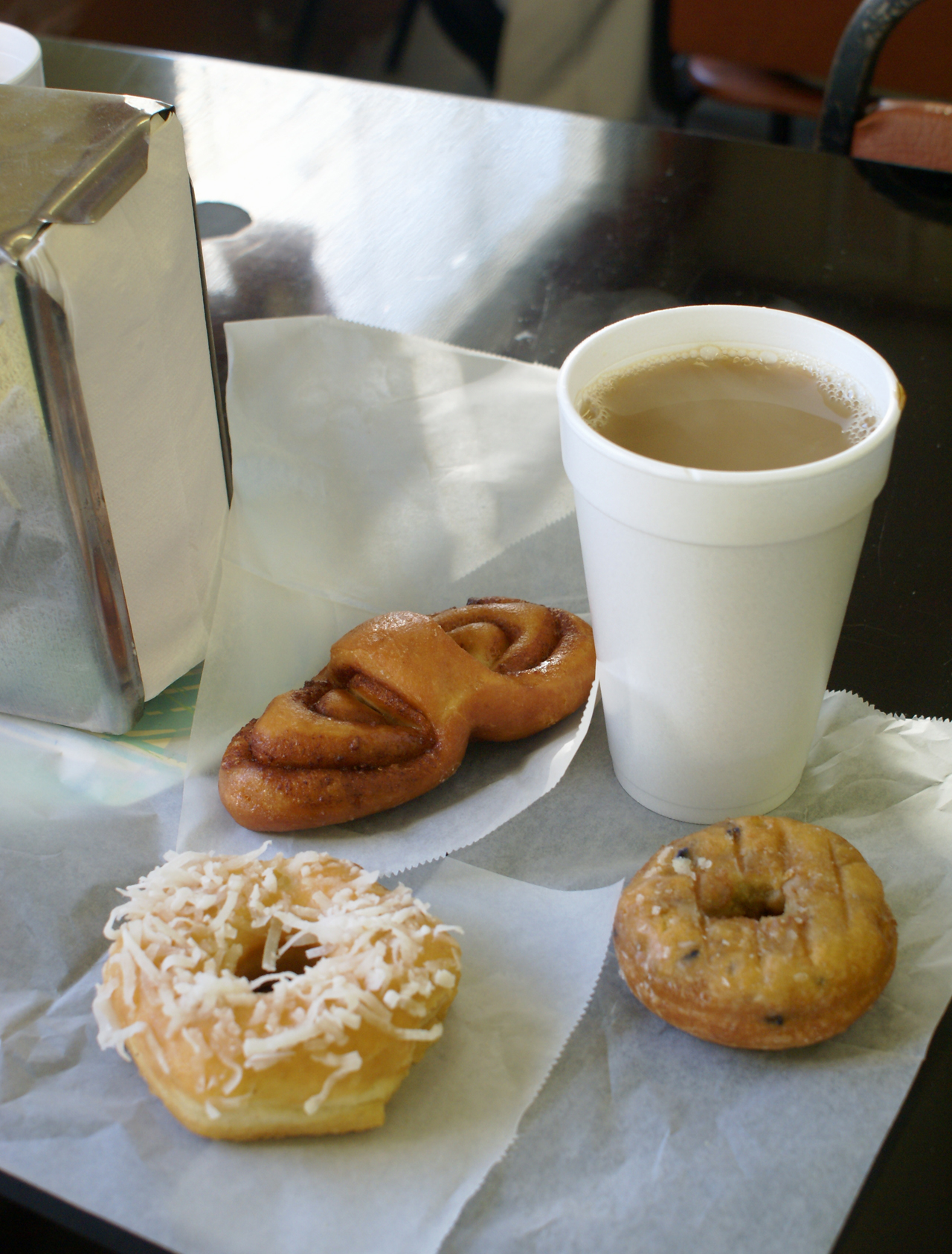
- A sampler of potato doughnuts from Spudnuts Coffee Shop in Charlottesville, Virginia, United States
- Alternative names: Spudnut
- Type: Doughnut
- Place of origin: United States
- Main ingredients: Potato

A potato doughnut, sometimes called a spudnut, is a type of doughnut, typically sweet, made with either mashed potatoes or potato starch instead of flour, the most common ingredient used for doughnut dough. Potato doughnuts tend to be lighter than all-flour doughnuts, and are prepared in a similar way as other doughnuts. A chain of Spudnut Shops was established across the United States in the 1940s before declining to a few dozen more recently. Fried ube dough is also eaten in East Asia, including the world's most expensive doughnut, the Golden Cristal Ube, which cost $100 each. Much like flour doughnuts, potato doughnuts are often eaten with coffee.

== History ==
The origin of the potato doughnuts is unknown. Syndicated recipes appeared in American newspapers as early as the 1870s. A recipe was published in a 1915 printing of the Five Roses Cook Book in Canada and also in 1938 in the Glenna Snow Cook Book. In the late 1930s, Vernon Rudolph began selling Krispy Kreme doughnuts, using a recipe containing potatoes. A chain of Spudnut Shops was established and spread to more than 500 locations in the United States before being thinned out to around 50 in the mid-2000s. The originating company eventually declared bankruptcy, but independent stores remain.

== Characteristics ==
Potato doughnuts share similar ingredients to normal doughnuts, but have all or most of the flour replaced with either mashed potatoes or potato starch.

Potato doughnuts tend to be a light, fluffy variety of doughnut and are usually topped with the same variety of frosting or toppings as other doughnuts. A potato doughnut may be deep-fried in lard to make a variety of Fasnacht.

== Preparation ==
Potato doughnuts are prepared by mixing instant mix or already prepared mashed potatoes in a bowl with eggs and other ingredients, ranging from baking powder to a small amount of flour. The dough is then shaped and refrigerated before being cooked.

== See also ==
- List of doughnut varieties
- List of potato dishes
- Fried dough foods
- Spudnuts
