= West Harbor =

Under construction park in Los Angeles, United States

- Interactive map of West Harbor
- Other name: San Pedro Public Market
- Location: San Pedro, Los Angeles, California
- Coordinates: 33.73348523104969°N 118.27769674974842°W
- Status: under construction
- Groundbreaking: 2022
- Estimated completion: 2026
- Use: food hall and waterfront park
- Website: www.westharborla.com

Companies
- Architect: James Corner Field Operations
- Developer: Ratkovich Company and Jerico Development
- Owner: Port of Los Angeles

Technical details
- Size: 42 acres (17 ha)
- Proposed: 2018

West Harbor is a food hall and waterfront park under construction in San Pedro, Los Angeles, California, facing Terminal Island and the Port of Los Angeles. Originally designated the San Pedro Public Market, the development is being built on 42 acres (17 ha) on the former site of Ports O' Call Village. The food hall will house five restaurants and 15 food stalls, as well as retail shops. The development will also feature a 3-acre pedestrian promenade (1.2 ha) and an open-air theater. West Harbor is being developed jointly by Ratkovich Company and Jerico Development. The developers have a 66-year lease with the port to build and operate the development. On November 11, 2022, it was announced that construction will begin immediately, and the project is expected to open in 2026.

The top-grossing San Pedro Fish Market and Restaurant in the Ports O' Call Village has signed a 49-year lease as an anchor tenant. After working from a couple of temporary sites, the new 55,000 square feet (5,100 m^{2}) restaurant will have a majority of its seating in an outdoor patio overlooking the waterfront.
