= Fasnacht (doughnut) =

Deep-fried Pennsylvania Dutch doughnut

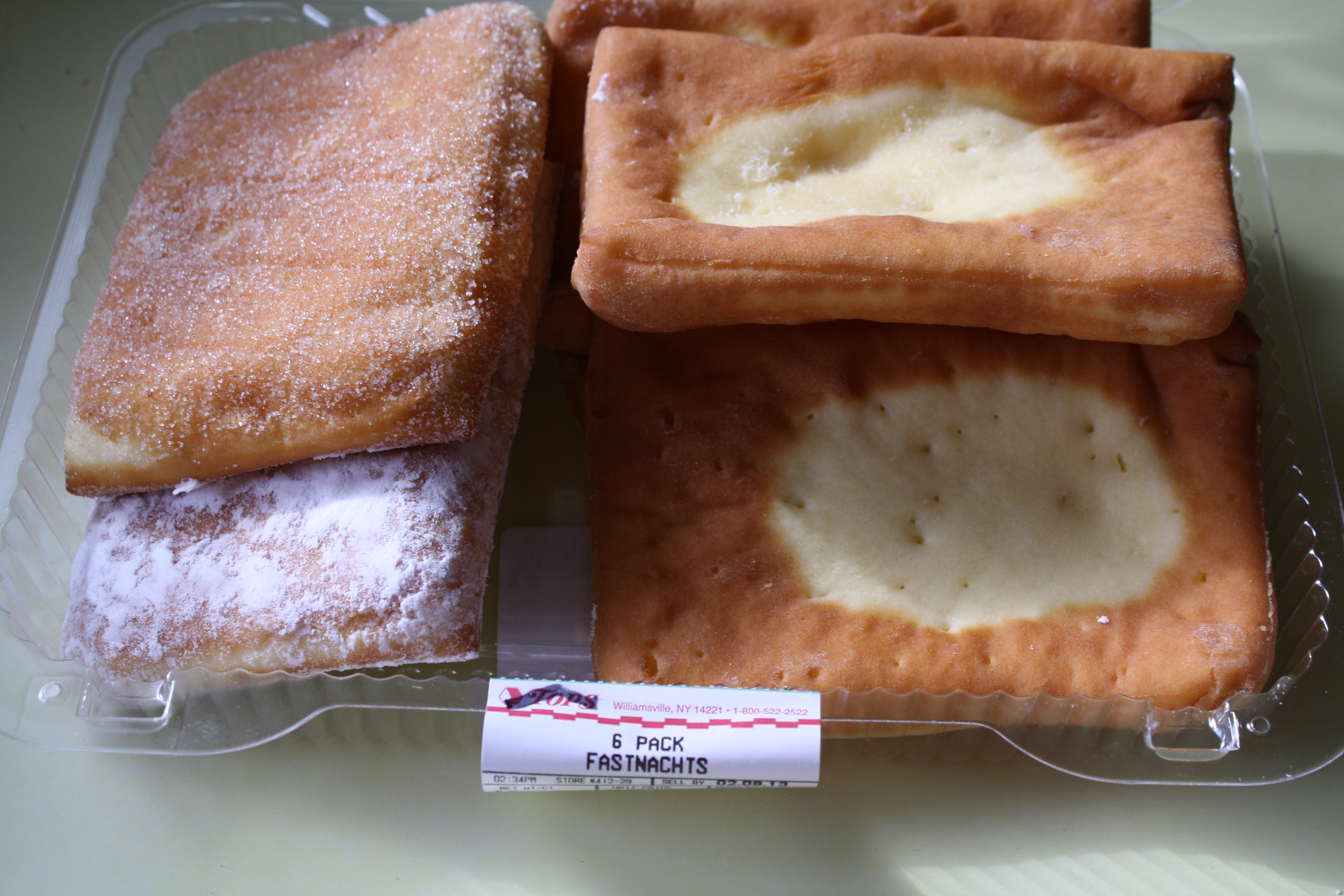
- Assorted rectangular fasnachts
- Alternative names: Fosnot, fosnaught
- Type: Doughnut
- Place of origin: Pennsylvania
- Associated cuisine: Pennsylvania Dutch cuisine

Fasnacht (also spelled fastnacht, faschnacht, fosnot, fosnaught, fausnaught, fassnacht) is a fried doughnut of Pennsylvania Dutch origin served traditionally in the days of Carnival or on Shrove Tuesday, the day before Lent starts. Fasnachts were made as a way to empty the pantry of lard, sugar, fat, and butter, which were traditionally fasted from during Lent. They are commonly associated with Pennsylvania Dutch cuisine, though they are not exclusive to it. They are found in some other areas of the United States with large German-American populations.

== Overview ==
The Pennsylvania Dutch in the area surrounding Lancaster, York, Lebanon, Berks and other PA Dutch counties in Pennsylvania, celebrate Fastnacht. Most chain supermarkets in eastern Pennsylvania offer fasnachts. They are commonly eaten with butter or golden syrup.

A similar culinary treat is the Polish Pączki. Pączki are traditionally eaten in Poland on the Thursday prior to Fasnacht Day, although in Polish communities of the US, the tradition is more commonly celebrated on Fasnacht Day. Commonly pączki are round, rather than having straight sides, and they are filled with jelly, or creme filling.

In parts of Maryland, the treats are called Kinklings, or "Kuechles" (not to be confused with kichel) and are only sold in bakeries on Shrove Tuesday. The German version is made from a yeast dough, deep fried, and coated or dusted in powdered sugar or cinnamon sugar; they may be plain or filled with fruit jam. Pennsylvania Dutch fasnachts can often be potato doughnuts, and may be uncoated, dusted with table sugar, or powdered with confectioner's sugar. Some purists insist that the uncoated pastry be eaten drizzled with honey.

The term is synonymous with the Carnival season which is called Fasnacht in southern Germany, Switzerland, Alsace and Austria. Although usually written "Fastnacht", there are many local spoken varieties: Fasnacht, Fassenacht, Fasnet, Fauschnaut, etc.

The word Fastnacht originates from the German words "fast", which is the shortened version of the verb "fasten", which means "to fast", and "Nacht", meaning night, indicating the eve of the traditional Lenten fasting period observed by many Christian denominations. It is the equivalent celebration to Mardi Gras or Carnival.

== Gallery ==
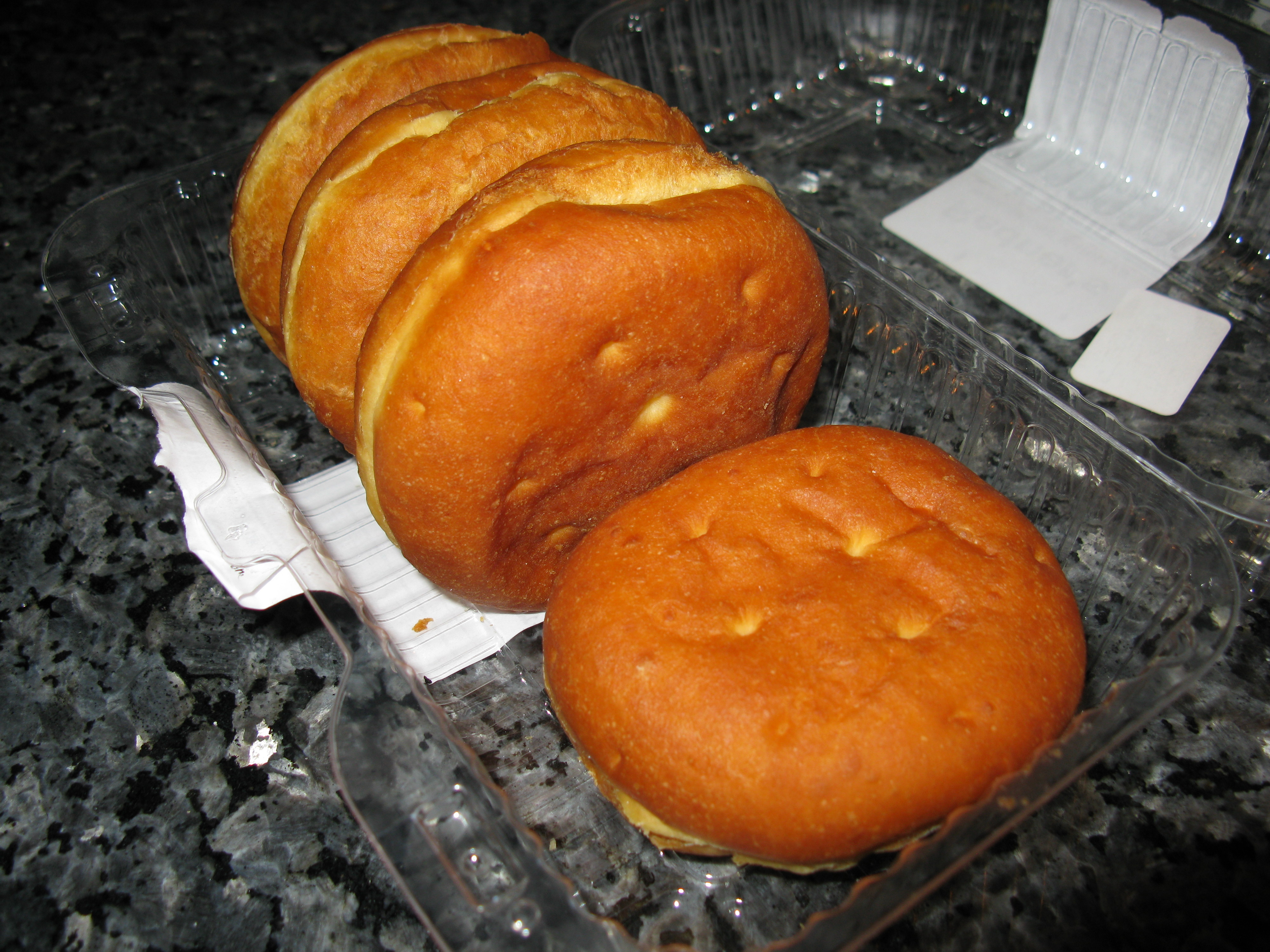
Round fasnachts

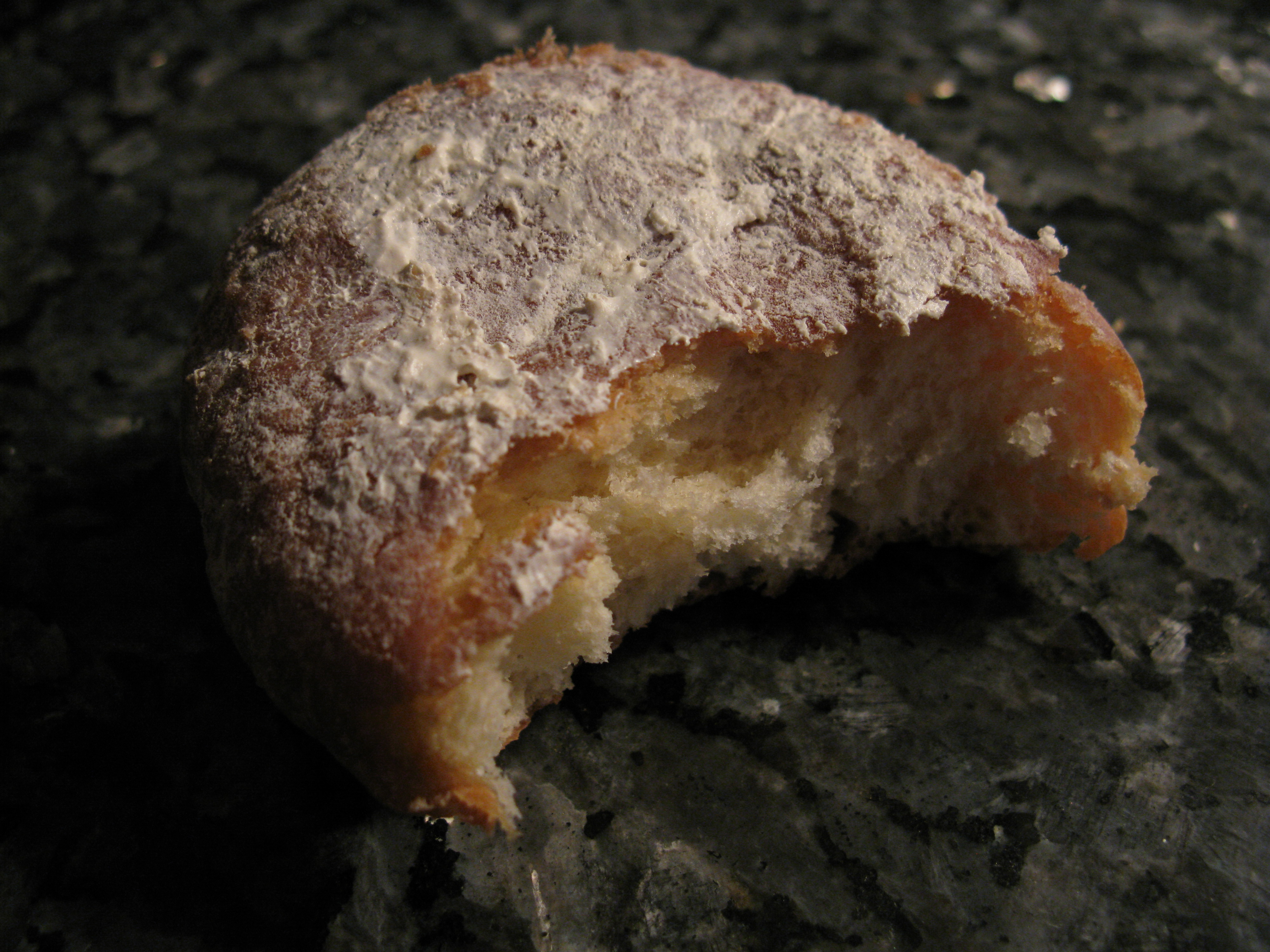
A powdered fasnacht

== See also ==
- List of doughnut varieties
- Pennsylvania Dutch cuisine
