= Miller's Smorgasbord =

Buffet restaurant in Ronks, Pennsylvania

- Interactive map of Miller's Smorgasbord

Restaurant information
- Established: 1929; 97 years ago
- Owners: Beatrice and Thomas Strauss
- Previous owner: Enos Miller
- Food type: Pennsylvania Dutch cuisine
- Location: 2811 Lincoln Highway, East Ronks, Pennsylvania, 17572, United States
- Seating capacity: 400
- Reservations: Yes
- Website: millerssmorgasbord.com

Miller's Smorgasbord is an American buffet restaurant located in Ronks, Pennsylvania, that primarily serves Pennsylvania Dutch comfort food.

== History ==
In 1929, Enos Miller opened a gas station and automobile repair shop on Lincoln Highway East in Ronks, Pennsylvania. Anna Miller, wife of Enos, sold home-cooked food to customers and became renowned for her Pennsylvania Dutch cuisine. The food side of the business became so successful that the Millers expanded it into the repair shop's space. The Millers sold it to employees Beatrice and Thomas Strauss in 1948. In 1957, the restaurant received its current name.

== Food ==
Miller's Smorgasbord primarily serves Pennsylvania Dutch comfort foods.

== Shoppes at Miller's ==
The Shoppes at Miller's is a shopping center associated with Miller's Smorgasbord.

== Awards and recognition ==
In 2024, Miller's Smorgasbord was ranked the number-three buffet in the country by USA Today; competitor Shady Maple Smorgasbord was ranked number one.
