= Ports O' Call Village =

Shopping center in California (1963–2020)

- Sierra Nevada anchored at Ports O' Call Village c. 1970
- Interactive map of Ports O' Call Village

Location
- Country: United States
- Location: San Pedro, Los Angeles
- Coordinates: 33°43′57″N 118°16′37″W

Details
- Opened: 1963
- Closed: 2020
- Size of harbour: 15 acres (6.1 ha)
- Land area: 15 acres (6.1 ha)

Statistics
- Website; Ports O' Call

Ports O' Call Village, located along the Port of Los Angeles main channel in San Pedro, was an outdoor shopping center that featured souvenir and gift shops, restaurants, sweetshops, fish markets, and quick-service eateries. The "seaside village" encompassed 15 acres of shops, restaurants, and attractions. A promenade of cobblestone streets connected specialty shops, which featured "an improbable mix of New England, Spanish Colonial, and Asian themes." The complex operated from 1963 until 2020.

== History ==
Ports O' Call Village, branded as an "elaborately themed seaside entertainment venue," was conceived and built by David Tallichet in 1963, a World War II pilot turned restaurateur who also built the Castaway and 94th Aero Squadron restaurants. Tallichet sought to create a blend of international destinations connected by cobblestone pathways, live music, and global cuisine.

The primary restaurant featured a Polynesian theme, with tall palm trees, a lagoon, and wooden footbridges at the entrance. It was later expanded to include an outdoor patio, portions of which extended over the water. A Southern California landmarks guide criticized the architectural style, noting: "I suppose I must include this, though a replica of a New England whaling village is not exactly my idea of a good representation of the rich California seafaring traditions the designers could have used."

The complex contained 71 retail units. A transit terminal for both RTD and Long Beach Public Transit buses opened in 1975 near the Sky Tower at the entrance to the village. The site also served as a departure point for whale watching boat tours. By 1976, attractions included "harbor cruises, helicopter rides, a puppet theater, sky tower, pirate ship, and unusual restaurants."

Annual events included the "LA Woody Car Show" in May, "The Taste in San Pedro" in August, and "Lobster Fest" in October. By 1989, the site attracted 1.1 million visitors annually.

Charles Ashbourne, a balloon artist, performed for children in the Cutlas Square section of the village from 1963 until at least 1995. By 2002, only about half of the retail spaces were occupied.

The Waterfront Red Car operated with a stop at Ports O' Call. By 2012, the complex was described as "ailing," and newer venues such as Crafted at the Port of Los Angeles were drawing more attention. Portions of Ports O' Call were demolished in 2018.

== Development ==
In 2013, the Los Angeles Board of Harbor Commissioners called for the redevelopment of the 30-acre waterfront site in the Port of Los Angeles that included Ports O' Call Village. Following a series of public meetings and community input, the Port of Los Angeles released its Public Access Investment Plan in 2015. The plan was intended to establish a sustainable and predictable approach to the Port's annual investment in non-cargo-related, public-serving projects and programs.

In March 2016, the Board of Harbor Commissioners approved a 50-year lease for the new San Pedro Public Market on the site. Plans for the project included restaurants, retail space, fresh markets, offices, and a waterfront promenade with outdoor areas and an open-air amphitheater.

In January 2020, a Port of Los Angeles spokesperson stated that the development would not open to the public for several more years. The project was rebranded as West Harbor in October 2020.

== See also ==
- Marina del Rey Fisherman's Village
- San Diego Seaport Village
