= Chicken and dumplings =

Chicken-based soup

- Alternative names: Chicken and pastry, chicken and sliders, chicken and slicks
- Type: Dumpling
- Place of origin: United States, Quebec
- Region or state: Southern and Midwestern United States
- Main ingredients: Flour, shortening, water or milk or stock; chicken

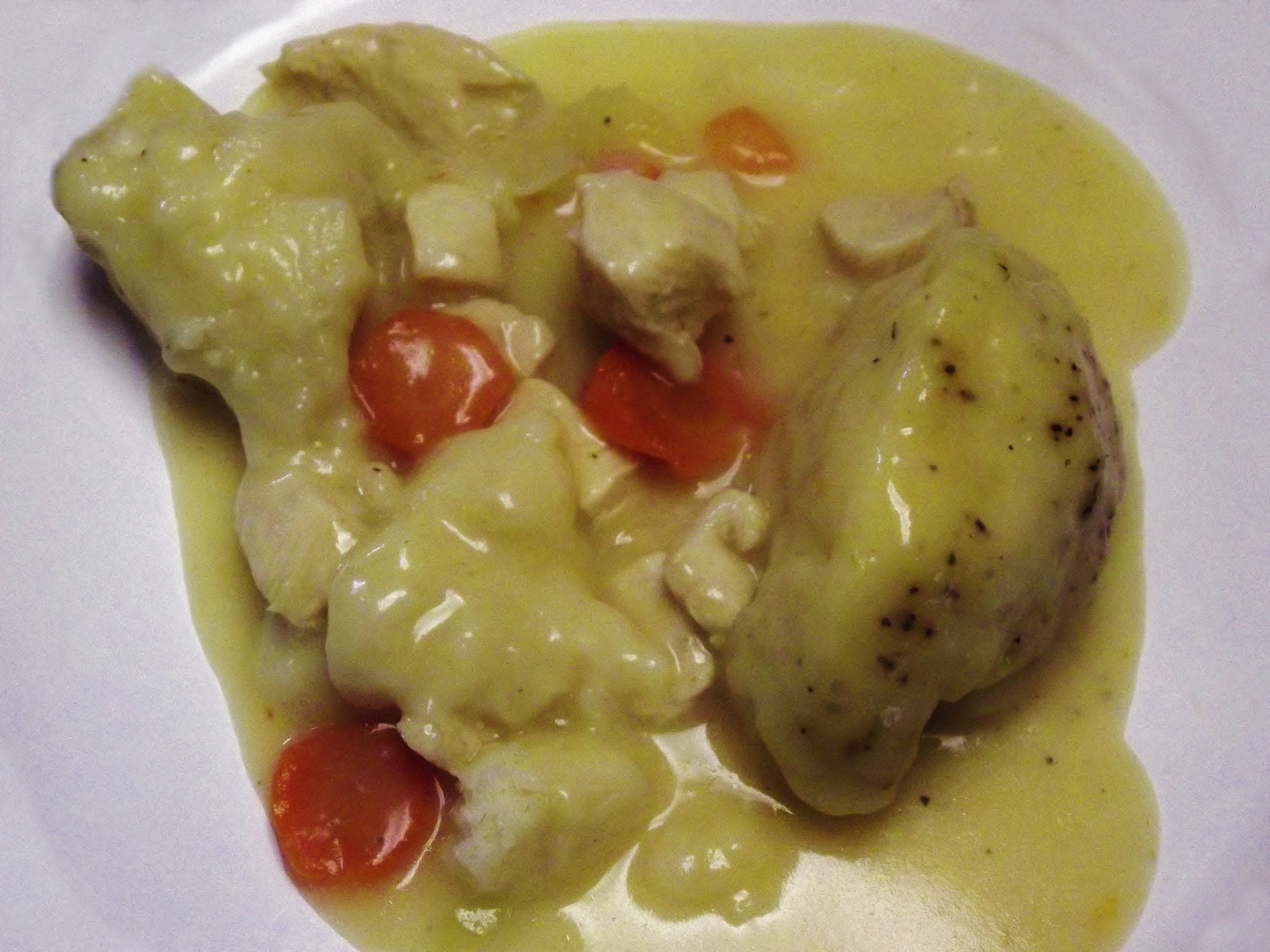
Chicken and dumplings with vegetables

Chicken and dumplings is a Southern United States, Midwestern and French Canadian dish that consists of a chicken boiled in water, with the resulting chicken broth being used to cook dumplings by boiling. A dumpling—in this context—is a biscuit dough, which is a mixture of flour, shortening, and liquid (water, milk, buttermilk, or chicken stock). The dumplings are either rolled out flat, dropped, or formed into a ball.

It is a popular comfort food dish, commonly found in the Southern and Midwestern United States, that is also attributed to being a French Canadian meal that originated during the Great Depression. Some sources say that chicken and dumplings originated in the Southern United States during the era of the Antebellum South and was considered a mainstay during harsh economic times. One of the earliest versions of the recipe was cornmeal dumplings cooked with turnip greens. Chicken and dumplings as a dish is prepared with a combination of simmered chicken meat, broth produced by simmering the chicken, multiple dumplings, and salt and pepper for seasoning. Sometimes finely chopped vegetables, such as carrots and celery, are added to the broth, and herbs such as dill, parsley, thyme, or chives are added to the dumpling dough.

== Preparation ==
Various commercial preparations of chicken and dumplings are available, including canned and frozen versions of the prepared dish. Frozen raw dumplings, typically very flat strips about 1x4 inches, can be cooked in any broth. The consistency of the prepared dish, whether homemade or purchased, varies from a thin soup to a very thick casserole-like consistency, easily eaten with a fork. Thicker preparations are made by gently simmering the dumplings longer and/or adding flour or another thickening agent directly to the broth. Flour tortillas or canned biscuits, rolled thin on a floured surface, cut into strips, are a quick and easy substitute for homemade dough. Butter may be added to the recipe for added richness.

Since chicken meat would become dry and tough if it is boiled long enough to cook the dumplings and thicken the broth, the chicken or parts are removed from the broth before adding the dumplings. While the dumplings are cooking, the meat is separated from the bones. When the dumplings are done and the broth seasoned and thickened, the chicken is returned to the broth. The dish is then ready to be served, but may be kept on low heat so as to not further cook the chicken.

== Variations ==
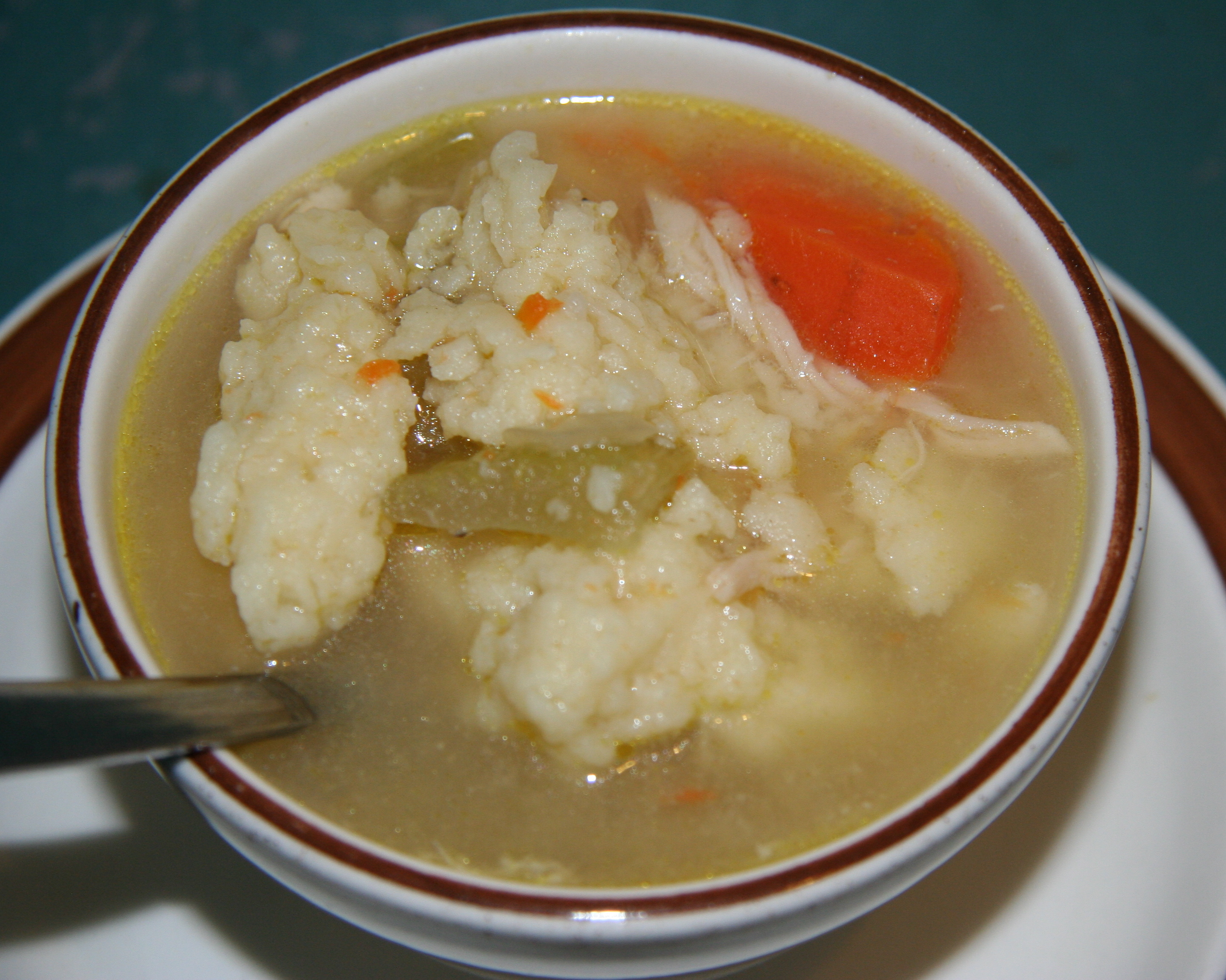
Chicken and dumpling soup at Nicoll's Cafe in Pine City, Minnesota.

A variant known as "chicken and pastry" or simply "chicken pastry" features wide, flat noodles rolled from biscuit dough. Where such a distinction is made, it is sometimes considered a different dish from "chicken and dumplings", which is known for small balls of dough rather than flat strips. In the Appalachian region of the United States, this preparation is called chicken and slicks. The Pennsylvania Dutch version is called bott boi. Chicken and dumpling soup is another variation, and is very popular in the Midwest.

=== Bott boi ===
Pennsylvania Dutch bott boi is a soup popular in central and southeastern Pennsylvania, also called chicken and dumplings in the American south. Bearing no resemblance to the baked dish known elsewhere as pot pie (itself known within Pennsylvania as "meat pies"), bott boi consists of large square noodles and a meat such as chicken, ham, or beef simmered in stock. Other common ingredients include potatoes, carrots, or celery. Saffron may also be added as a flavoring, particularly in Pennsylvanian restaurants catering to a niche market among the Pennsylvania Dutch farming communities.

Created to use up leftovers, Pennsylvania Dutch pot pie developed from the more widespread baked variety. Its characteristic noodles were added as a staple of the Pennsylvania Dutch and English diets. The ease of preparing it in large quantities has made it popular for fundraisers, community dinners, and other large-scale preparations.

==== Preparation ====
Bott boi is a soup of thick square-cut dough boiled in chicken broth. Turkey or other poultry can be substituted for the chicken. Potatoes and various vegetables may be added, and the broth can also be seasoned with saffron. The simple dough is made from flour and eggs, with a little water or milk.

== See also ==
- Chicken soup, a clear broth, often served with small pieces of chicken or vegetables
- Chicken noodle soup
- Dough, a paste made by mixing flour with a small amount of water and/or other liquid
- Kreplach, small dumplings filled with ground meat, mashed potatoes or another filling, usually boiled and served in chicken soup
- List of chicken dishes
- List of dumplings
- Pennsylvania Dutch cuisine
