= Cuisine of the Pennsylvania Dutch =

Typical and traditional fare of the Pennsylvania Dutch

Pennsylvania Dutch cuisine is the typical and traditional fare of the Pennsylvania Dutch.

Pennsylvania Dutch cuisine reflects influences of the Pennsylvania Dutch's German heritage, agrarian society, and rejection of rapid change.

It is common to find Pennsylvania Dutch cuisine throughout the Philadelphia, Allentown, and Lancaster regions of Pennsylvania.

== Techniques ==
In the 18th century, baking was still done in wood-fired ovens that produced inconsistent results and could easily overheat. The Pennsylvania Dutch baked pastries on cabbage leaves to protect against hot spots that could develop in the oven.

== Soups ==
Soups, often featuring egg noodles, are characteristic of the Pennsylvania Dutch. Pennsylvanian Dutch homes have traditionally had many broths on hand (vegetable, fish, poultry, and other meats) from the saving of any extra liquids available, culinary historian William Woys Weaver writes: "The Pennsylvania Dutch developed soup making to such a high art that complete cookbooks could be written about their soups alone; there was an appropriate soup for every day of the year, including a variety of hot and cold fruit soups." Soups were traditionally divided into different categories, including Sippli, which is a light broth, Koppsupper, a cup soup, Suppe, which is a thick, chowder soup often served as a meal with bread, and G'schmorte, a soup with no broth often like a Brei or gravy.

Pennsylvania Dutch soups are often thickened with a starch, such as mashed potatoes, flour, rice, noodles, fried bread, dumplings, and Riwwels or rivels, which are small dumplings described as "large crumbs" made from "rubbing egg yolk and flour between the fingers", from the German verb for "to rub."

== Pennsylvania Dutch specialties ==
=== Beverages ===
- Birch beer

=== Dishes ===
- Amish potato salad
- Apple butter
- Apple dumpling—cored and peeled apple, covered in a pie-crust, dusted with sugar or cinnamon, and baked. Served in a bowl with milk. Sometimes eaten as dessert, but generally a meal in and of itself.
- Bova Shankel—a pierogi-type dish of potato dumplings and sauce.
- Brown butter noodles—egg noodles combined with butter that was melted and browned in a pan.
- Hot bacon dressing—cooked, drained, crumbled bacon in a thickened sweet dressing, served hot over fresh salad greens; often used with dandelion greens to offset their tart taste.
- Pennsylvania-style chicken and waffles- made with rotisserie chicken and gravy
- Chicken corn soup—made with egg noodles and sometimes saffron, which has been cultivated in Pennsylvania Dutch country since the early 19th century; egg noodles, corn, hard-boiled eggs, and chicken. Sometimes an addition is rivels, small dumplings.
- Chow-chow
- Coleslaw
- Cup cheese
- Gingerbread, ginger snaps, ginger cake, and pot roast spiced with ginger and other aromatic spices.
- Hamloaf—a meatloaf-like dish made of ground ham, often baked with brown sugar on top, lacking the spices and bread crumbs found in meatloaf.
- Hog maw—pig's stomach, called Seimaaga in the Pennsylvania Dutch dialect.
- Lebanon bologna
- Peanut butter schmear
- Pepper cabbage—a sweet and sour dish
- Pork and sauerkraut
- Potato filling
- Potato rolls
- Pot pie—not the baked pie with a pastry top, but a meat stew with large noodles (pot pie squares); often features chicken, flour, salt, vegetables (such as celery, onion, and carrots) as well as spices (such as parsley, thyme, black pepper, and bay leaf).
- Pretzel
- Red beet eggs (pickled beet eggs)
- Sauerbraten—sour roast, is any one of various meats and spices that are marinated for several days in vinegar or wine, and vegetables are added to the marinade during the final day. Sauerbraten was traditionally made using horse meat, but beef or other cuts of meat are now favored. It is often served with dumplings and red cabbage. Sauerbraten remains very popular throughout Germany.
- Schnitz un knepp
- Scrapple

=== Desserts ===
- Apple dumplings
- Dutch baby pancake
- Sand Tarts - cookies traditionally made around Christmas
- Church spread—made from molasses or corn syrup, marshmallow cream, and peanut butter, often found at Amish church services and community events.
- Cracker pudding—thickened with saltine crackers
- Fastnachts
- Funnel cake
- Funny cake—a combination of pie and cake that is made by baking a cake surrounded by pie crust, marbled throughout with chocolate streaks.
- Whoopie pie
- Montgomery pie—buttery crust with a gooey molasses and lemon filling and a buttermilk cake topping.
- Shoofly pie—molasses crumb cake with a pie crust for easier eating.

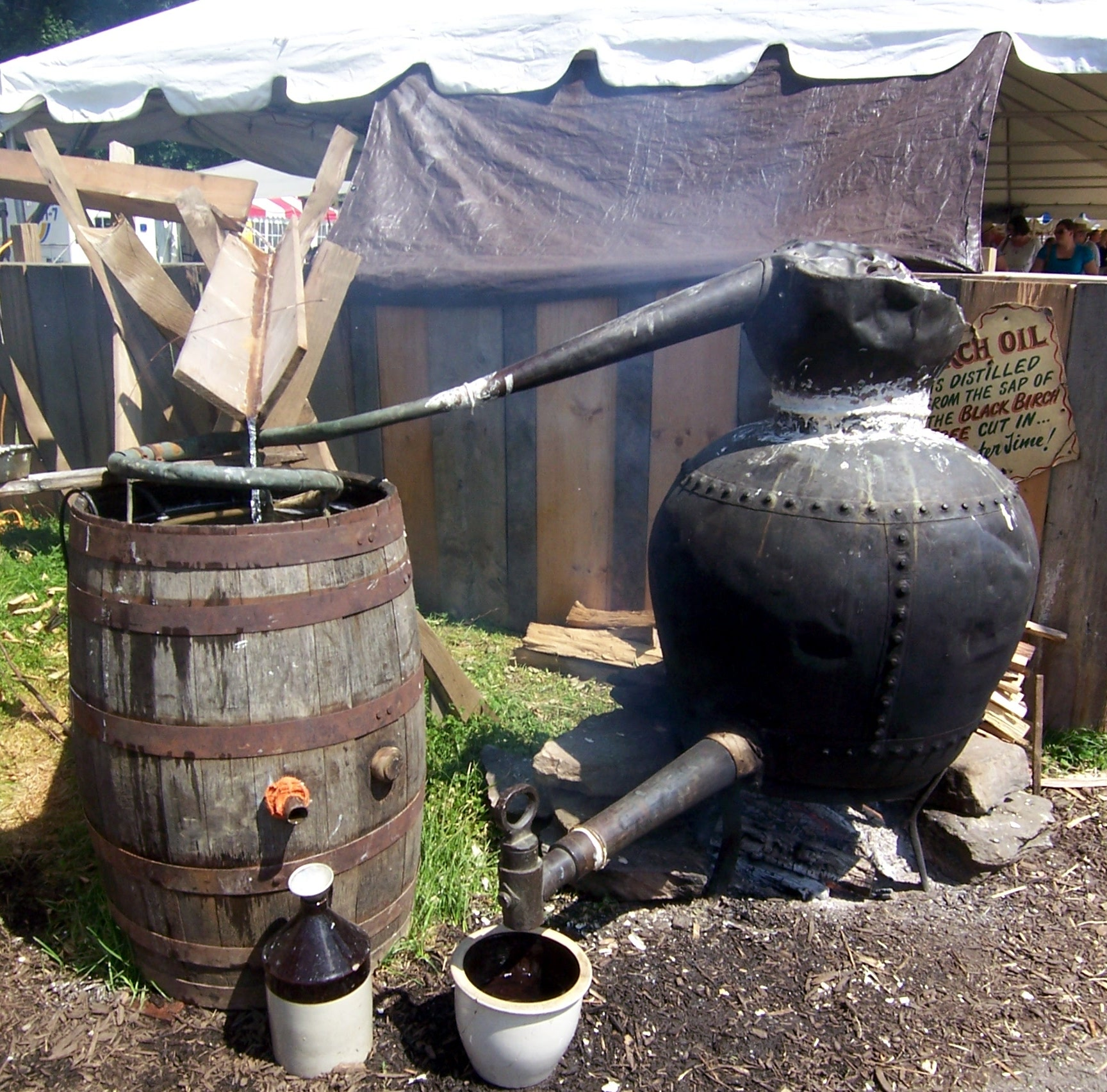
Working birch beer at the Kutztown Folk Festival in Kutztown, Pennsylvania

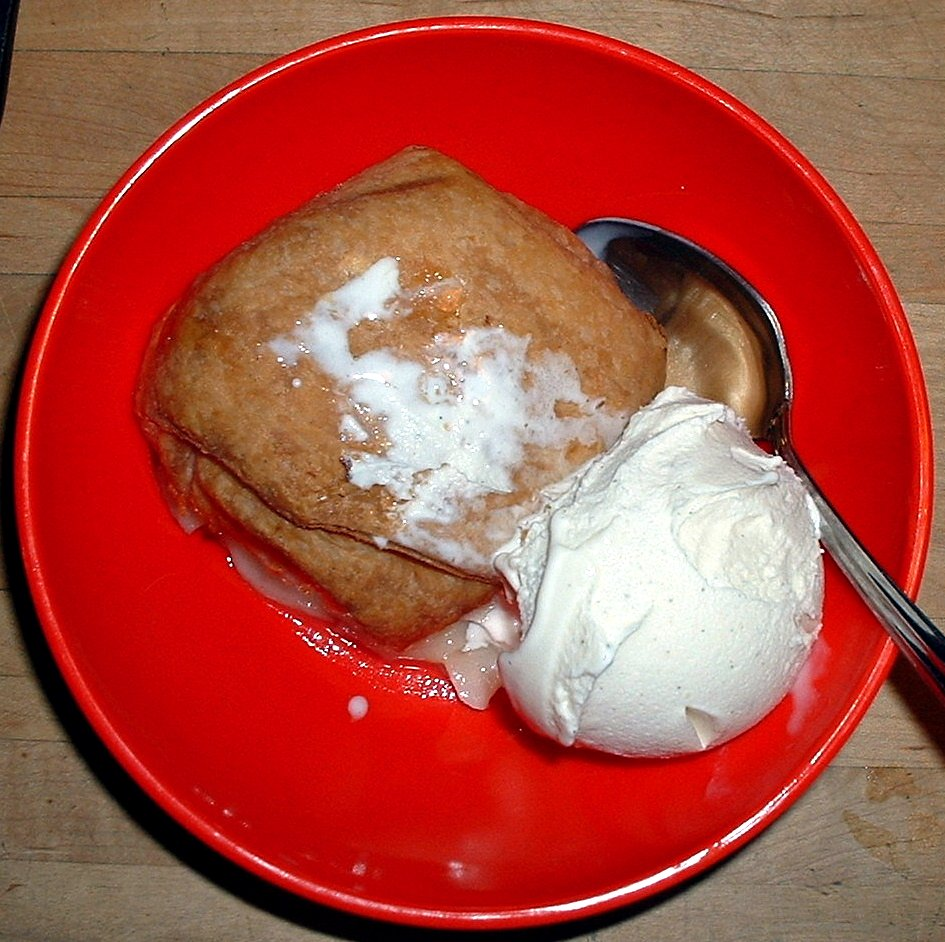
Apple dumpling

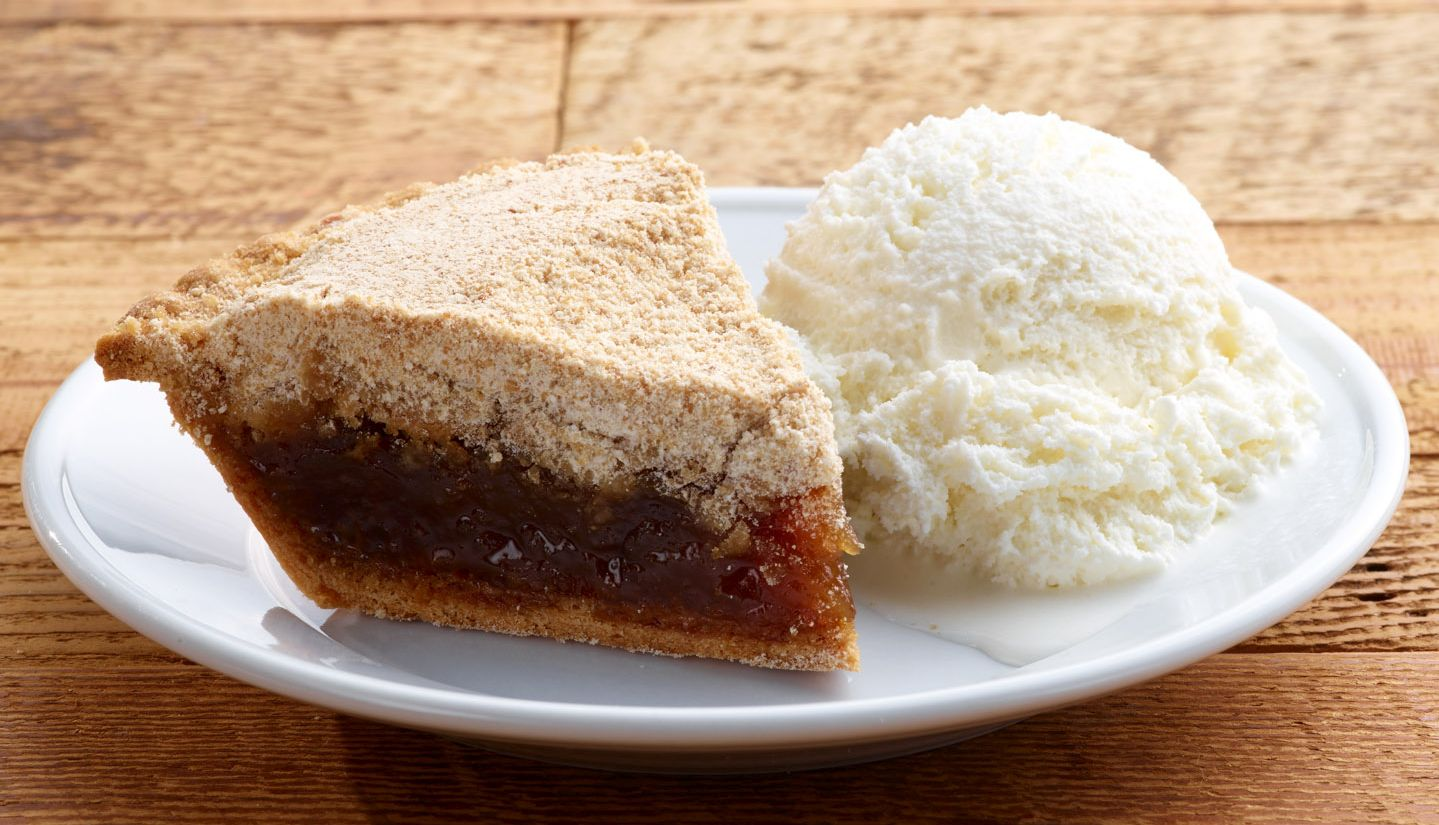
Shoofly pie from Good N Plenty Restaurant

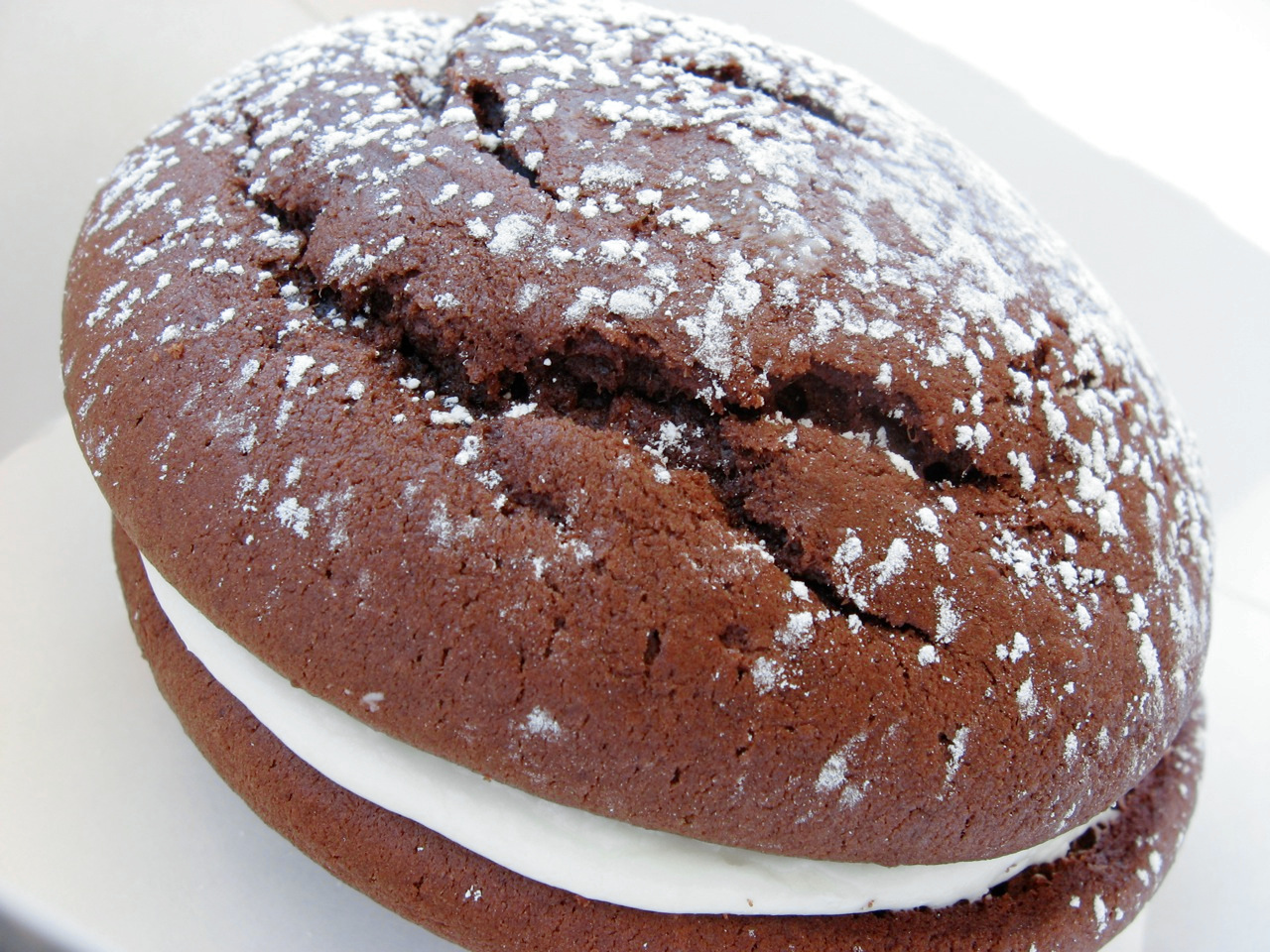
Whoopie pie

== See also ==
- Cuisine of Philadelphia
- Smorgasbord
- Miller's Smorgasbord
- Shady Maple Smorgasbord
