= Kamala Beach =

Kamala Beach กมลา
- Beach
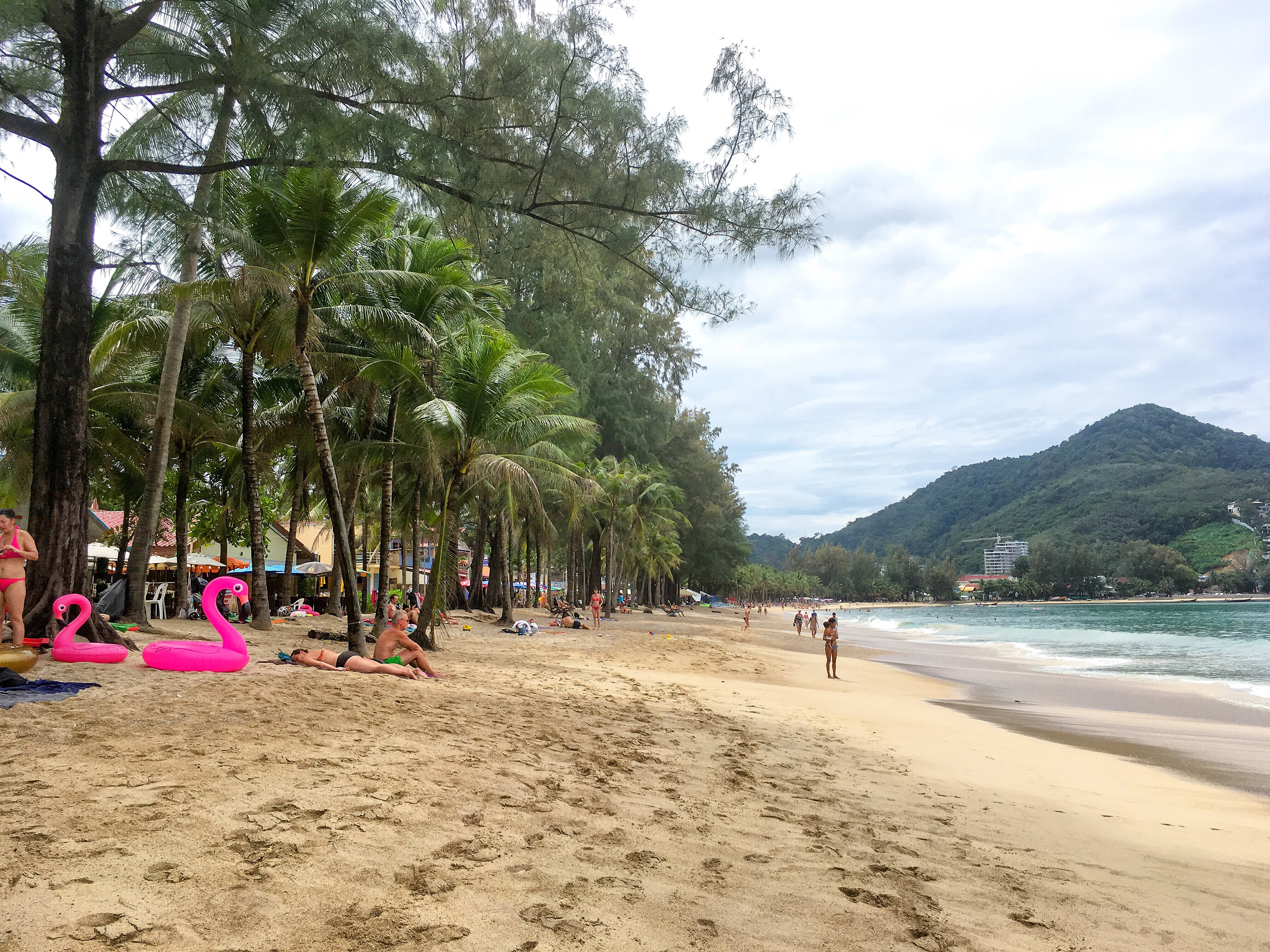

- Location within Thailand
- Coordinates: 7°57′26.2″N 98°16′58.9″E
- Country: Thailand

Languages
  - Official: Thai
- Time zone: UTC+7 (Indochina Time)

Kamala Beach or just Kamala (Thai: กมลา, pronounced [kā.mā.lāː]) refers to the beach and town on the west coast of Phuket, Thailand. It is one of the major tourist attractions in Phuket.

== Geography ==
It is situated north of Patong, about 8 km, and at a distance of about 45 minutes from Phuket Airport via car. It has a long sandy curvy stretch of 3 km and usually a quiet atmosphere.

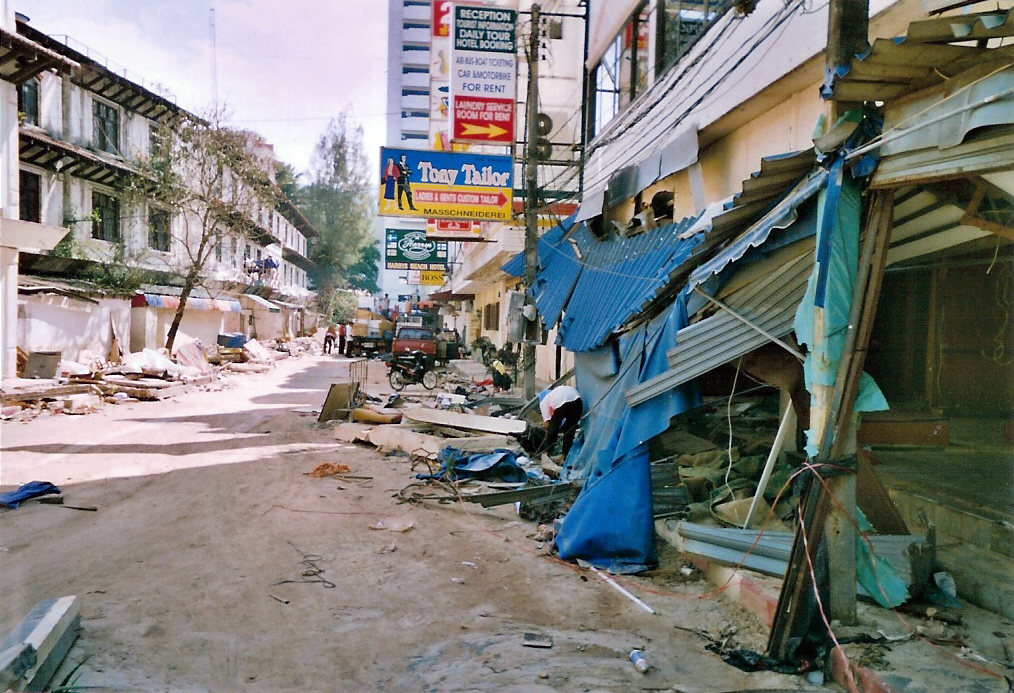
Tsunami's aftermath (Patong)

=== 2004 Tsunami ===
On 26 December 2004, a tsunami wave caused by the Indian Ocean earthquake struck major west coast beaches of Phuket, and Kamala suffered severe damage.

=== COVID-19's effect ===
The COVID-19 Pandemic affected Phuket severely, including Kamala Beach. The quarantine majorly impacted country's tourism. The Minister of Tourism and Sports Phiphat Ratchakitprakarn, quoted "Phuket, Samui and Phi Phi -- among the first places to welcome inoculated tourists without quarantine before a wider national reopening -- are all smaller islands and will allow authorities to quickly curb movement if community transmission spikes. Proof of vaccination and negative COVID-19 infection by rapid antigen test was previously mandated to visit Phuket, however this requirement was removed on October 1, 2022.

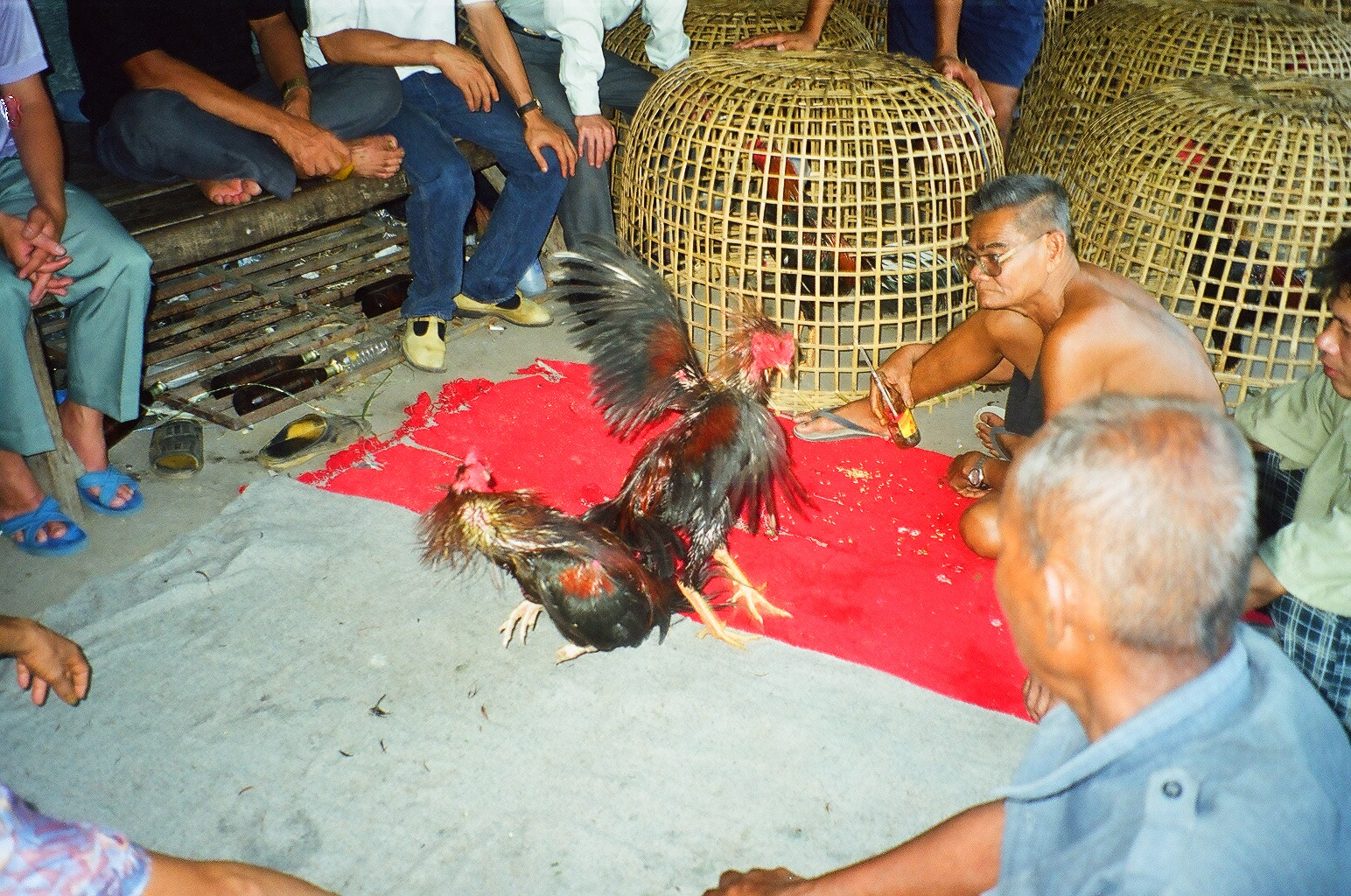
Cockfighting

== Cock fighting/breeding ==
Cockfighting is illegal in Phuket, but Kamala Beach has become the center for breeding cock fight chicken in Phuket. Many breeding centers are run by influential people, politicians, and local mafias. This has caused conflicts amongst landowners who share their borders with cock breeding centers because of the cocks’ crowing, and the corresponding decrease in the land's financial value.
