= Cosmo (restaurant) =

British buffet restaurant chain

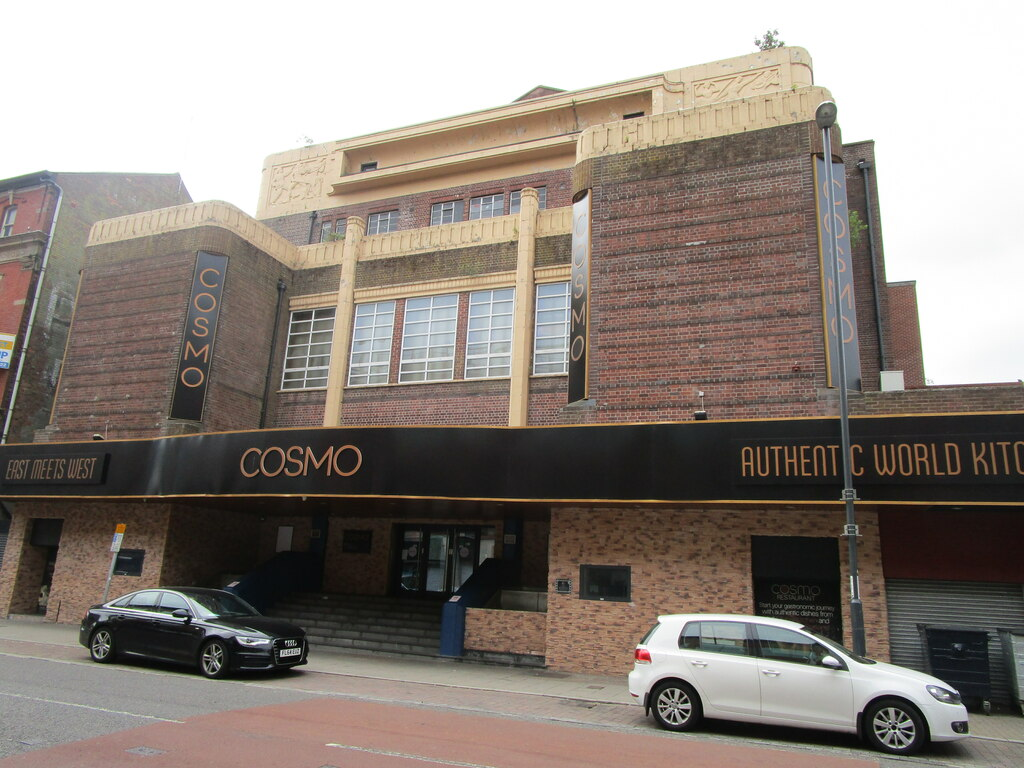
- Cosmo in Derby, in 2021
- Type: Buffet
- Industry: Restaurant
- Founded: 2003
- Founder: Tom Chan
- Headquarters: London, England
- Number of locations: 22
- Area served: United Kingdom; Ireland
- Website: cosmo-restaurants.co.uk

Cosmo is a British buffet restaurant chain founded by Tom Chan in 2003.

== Overview ==
The first Cosmo restaurant was opened by Tom Chan in Eastbourne in 2003. It has since opened British and Irish branches in locations like Aberdeen, Belfast, Bristol, Dublin, Liverpool, Manchester, Oxford, Reading, Romford, Southampton, and Wolverhampton, amongst others. It previously had sites in Chatham, Coventry, Croydon, Leeds, Margate, Northampton, Nottingham, Swansea, Swindon, Tunbridge Wells, and York; these are now closed, as is the original site in Eastbourne.

Cosmo includes live cooking stations where customers can have food cooked to order. The restaurant serves over 150 dishes from around the world; these are primarily Asian from such countries such as China, India, Japan, Korea, Malaysia, Mongolia, Thailand, Singapore, and Vietnam, but it also offers cuisine from countries such as Italy and the United Kingdom.

In 2011, Cosmo was named the UK's biggest restaurant, with a seating capacity of 800. In 2015, it was voted third in the CGA Peach Brand Track Survey for "Customer Satisfaction" and second for "Value for Money".

== Locations ==
=== Current ===
- Aberdeen
- Belfast
- Bournemouth
- Bristol
- Cardiff
- Derby
- Doncaster
- Dublin
- Edinburgh
- Glasgow
- Liverpool
- Manchester
- Newcastle upon Tyne
- Norwich
- Oxford
- Preston
- Reading
- Romford
- Sheffield
- Southampton
- Wolverhampton

=== Former ===
- Chatham
- Coventry
- Croydon
- Eastbourne
- Leeds
- Margate
- Northampton
- Nottingham
- Swansea
- Swindon
- Tunbridge Wells
- York
