= Key lime pie =

American custard pie

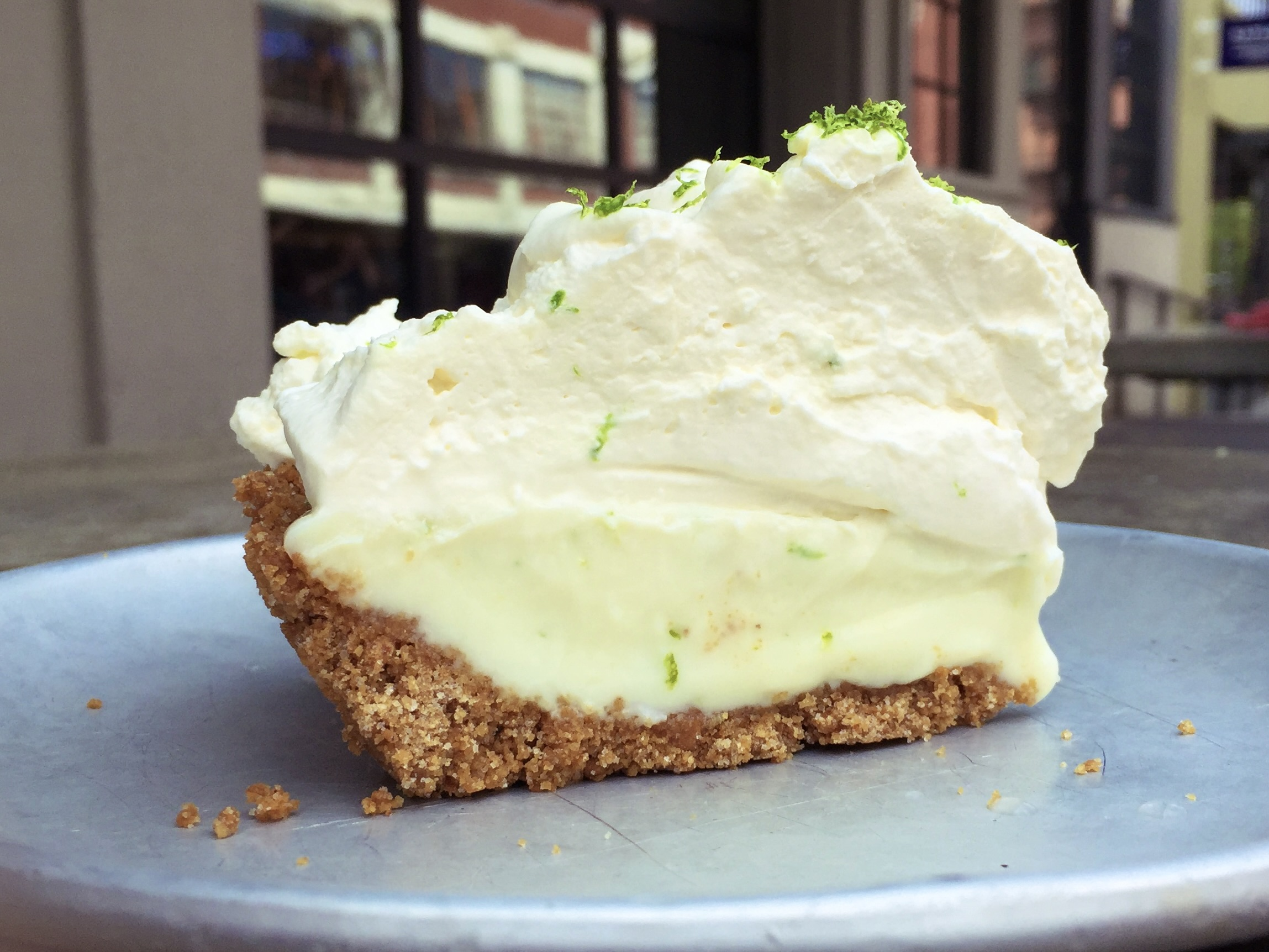
- Slice of Key lime pie
- Type: Pie
- Course: Dessert
- Place of origin: United States
- Region or state: Key West, Florida
- Main ingredients: Graham cracker crust, Key lime juice, egg yolks, sweetened condensed milk

Key lime pie is a Floridian dessert pie made with Key lime juice, egg yolks, and sweetened condensed milk. It may be served with no topping, with a meringue topping made from egg whites, or with whipped cream. Traditionally, Key lime pie is made using a graham cracker crust. It may be made with or without baking in a pie crust or without crust. The dish is named after the small Key limes, which are more aromatic than the common Persian limes, and which have yellow juice. The filling in a Key lime pie is yellow because ripe key limes are yellow.

The filling is made similarly to a Magic Lemon cream pie, by mixing the ingredients without cooking: the proteins of the egg yolks and condensed milk and the acidic lime juice curdle, thickening the mixture without baking. The pies are usually baked to pasteurize the eggs and thicken the filling further.

== History ==
Key lime pie is probably derived from the "Magic Lemon Cream Pie" published in a promotional brochure by Borden, a producer of condensed milk, in 1931. The recipe is attributed to Borden's fictional spokesperson, Jane Ellison, and includes condensed milk, lemon juice and rind, and egg yolks. It is covered with meringue, baked, and served cold. According to the pastry chef Stella Parks, users of the recipe altered it with local ingredients; she describes it as "a stunning reminder of how deeply America's traditions are shaped by advertising". In the 1980s, food writer John Egerton dated the presence of key lime pie in the Florida Keys to at least the 1890s, a dating author Jean Anderson characterized as credible due to nature of refrigeration standards of the time.

A "Tropical Lime Chiffon Pie", using condensed milk and egg yolks was documented in a 1933 Miami newspaper article. An "icebox lime pie", was mentioned as a specialty of the Florida Keys in 1935. and a recipe under the name "Key Lime Pie" was published in 1940.

No earlier solid sources are known, despite appeals to the public. A 1927 Key West Women's Club cookbook does not mention the recipe. A 1926 restaurant menu includes "lime pie", but it is unclear what it was. Various accounts claim that it was known earlier, but none were recorded before 1933. A widely reported story claims that William Curry's cook Aunt Sally invented it in the late 19th century. But there is no evidence for this, and the oldest version of this story dates to only 1995, in promotional materials for a Bed and Breakfast in Curry's former house.

It was in the 1950s that Key lime pie was promoted as Florida's "most famous treat" and in 1987 as "the greatest of all regional American desserts."

== Key limes ==
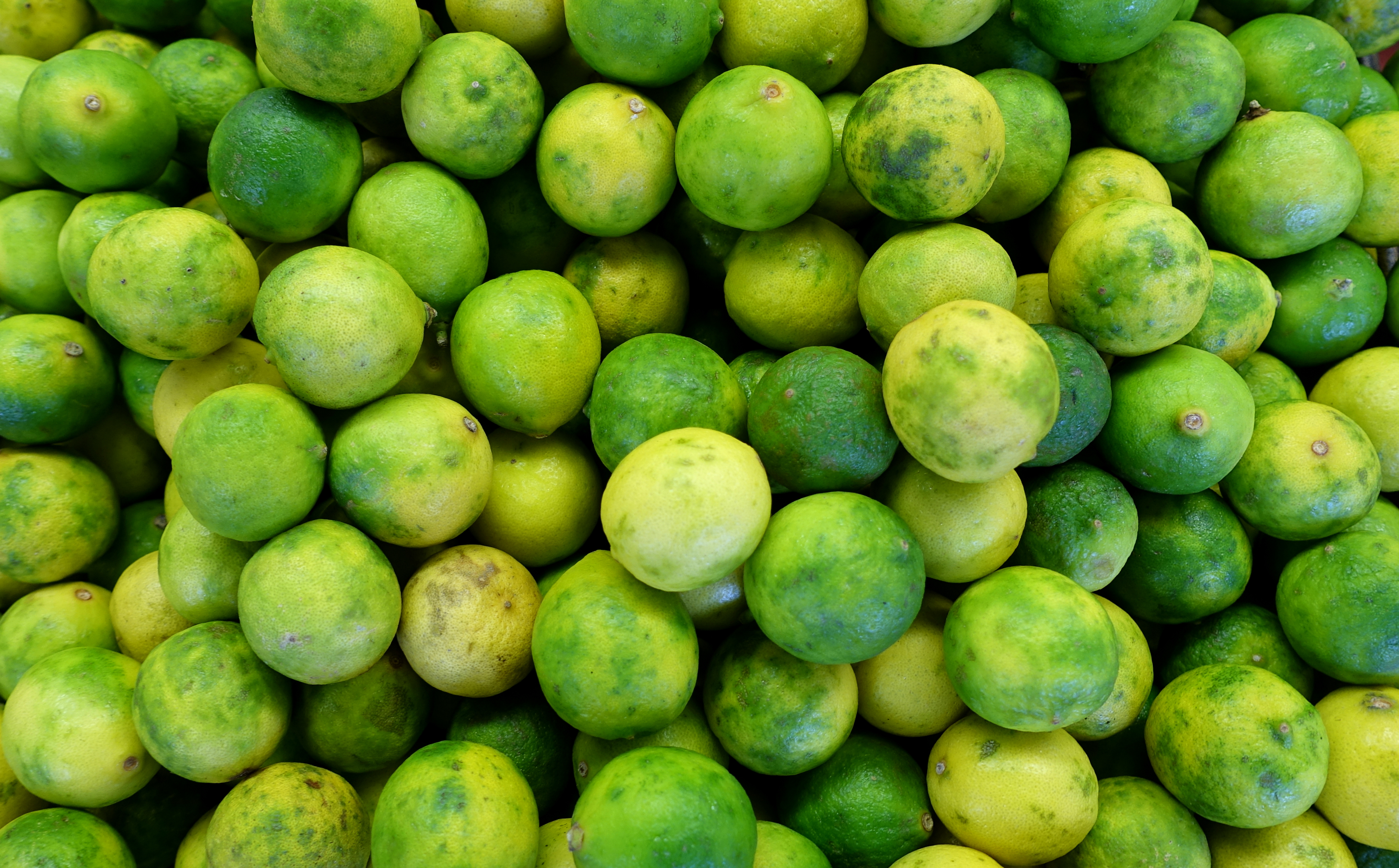
Key limes

Key lime (Citrus aurantifolia 'Swingle') is naturalized throughout the Florida Keys. While the tree's thorns make harvesting them less tractable, and the fruit's thin, yellow rind is more perishable than the common Persian limes seen year-round at grocery stores in the United States, Key limes are both more tart and more aromatic. They have not been grown commercially in the U.S. since the 1926 Miami hurricane, and are generally imported from Central or South America. Key lime juice, unlike regular lime juice, is a pale yellow. Bottled Key lime juice, invariably from concentrate, is widely available at retail in the United States.

== Legislation ==
Florida State Representative Bernie Papy Jr. is said to have introduced geographical indication legislation in 1965 calling for a $100 fine to be levied against anyone advertising Key lime pie not made with Key limes. The bill failed.

Florida statute 15.052, passed in July 2006, designates Key lime pie "the official Florida state pie".

== See also ==
- Cream pie
- Lemon meringue pie
- Lemon pie
- Lime
- Pavlova
