= Cream pie =

Custard based pie

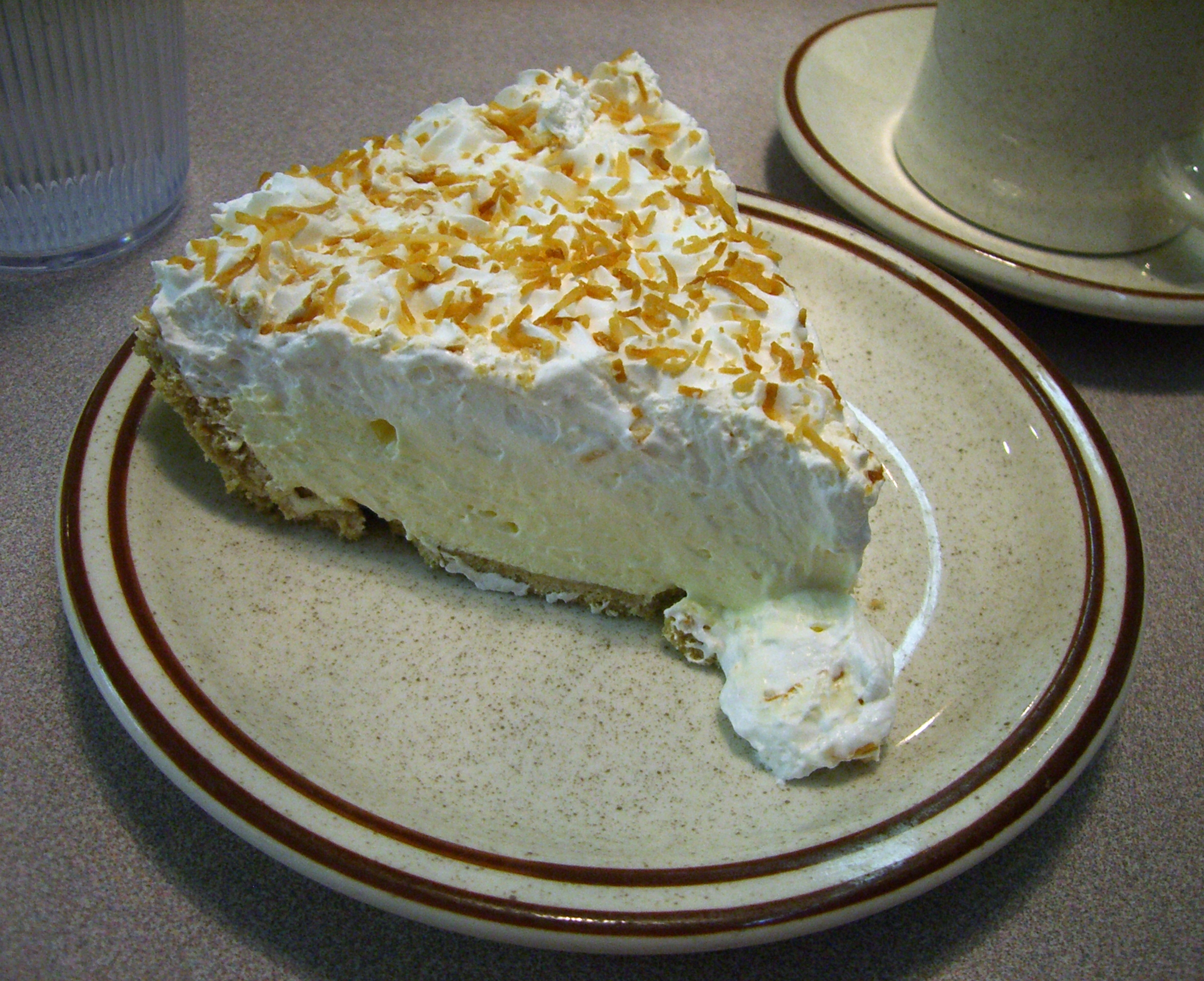
- A slice of coconut cream pie topped with whipped cream and toasted coconut
- Main ingredients: Shortcrust pastry or Graham cracker crust, milk, cream, flour, sugar, eggs

A cream pie, crème pie, creme pie or custard pie is a type of pie filled with a rich custard or pudding that is made from milk, cream, sugar, wheat flour, and eggs and typically topped with whipped cream. Cream pies are usually what is used for pieing, or throwing a pie in someone's face.

Pies with a custard-type filling have been made since medieval times. An early recipe can be found in the 14th century cookbook The Forme of Cury, which was made with a mixture of cream, almond milk, sugar and saffron. The earliest recipe in America that was called a cream pie according to The Oxford Companion to Sugar and Sweets, was to be found in the 1844 cookbook The Improved Housewife by Mrs A. L. Webster, and was an egg custard flavoured with raisins, nutmeg, mace and citron. However, Hoosier pie, according to the 1976 cookbook, The Hoosier Cookbook by Elaine Lumbra and Jacqueline Lacy, has a note stating the recipe was 160 years old, taking it back to prior to 1816.

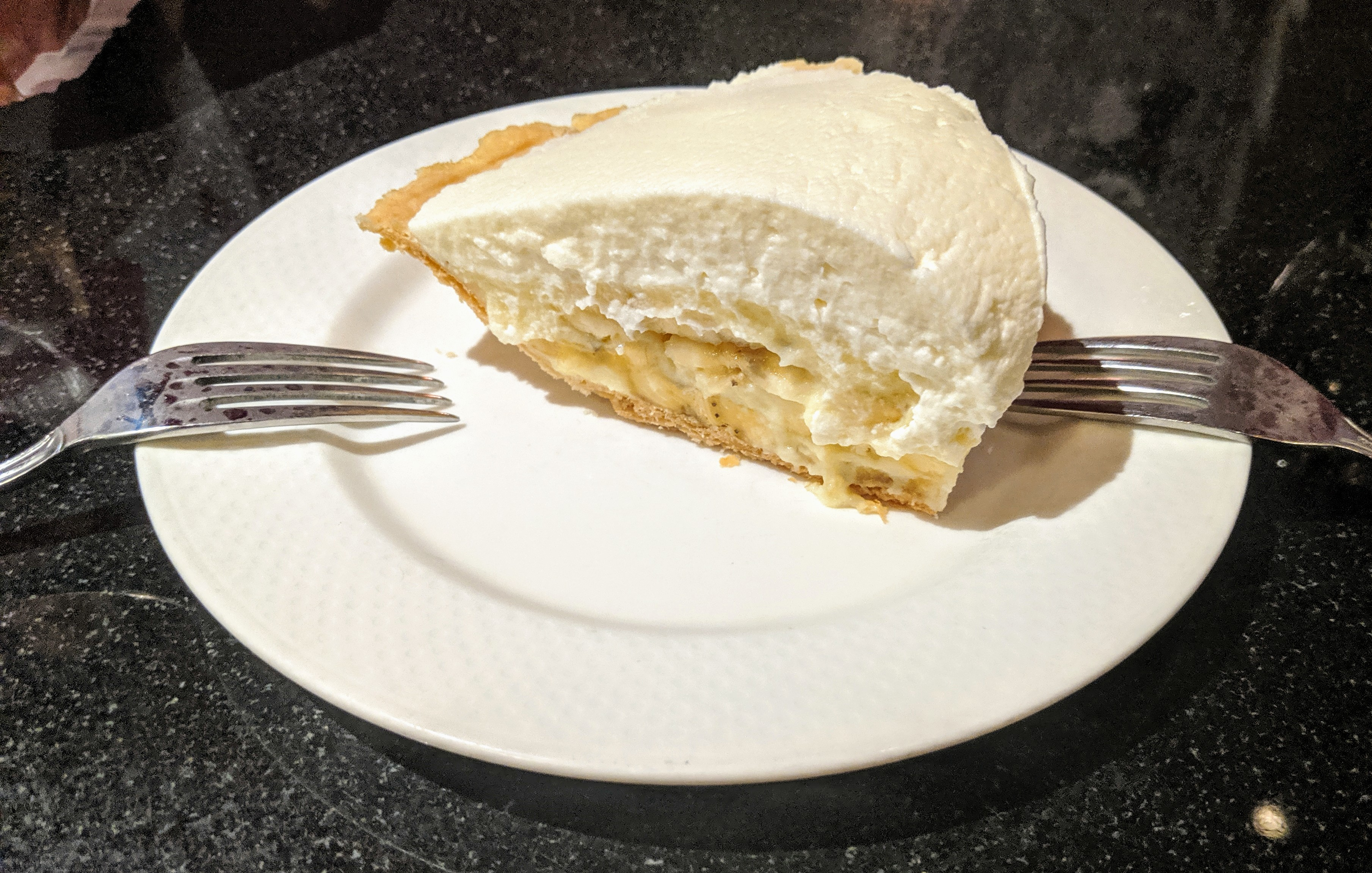
Banana cream pie for two

One notable version is the banana cream pie. Cream pies are made in many other flavors, including vanilla, lemon, lime, peanut butter, coconut, and chocolate.

== Ingredients ==
Most cream pies have a custard filling, with modern pies having a whipped cream topping. The custard style filling is similar to crème patissière, a key component of French cakes, and tarts. It is a one-crust pie, where the crust covers the bottom and sides but not the top. The crust may be made with shortcrust pastry, or with a crumb crust of crumbled cookies or a graham cracker crust.

Most cream pies are made with a cooked custard filling. The "Magic Lemon Cream Pie", invented at Borden and attributed to their fictional spokesperson, Jane Ellison, is instead thickened by the room-temperature curdling of a mixture of sweetened condensed milk, eggs, and lemon juice. This later evolved into Key lime pie.

== Pieing ==
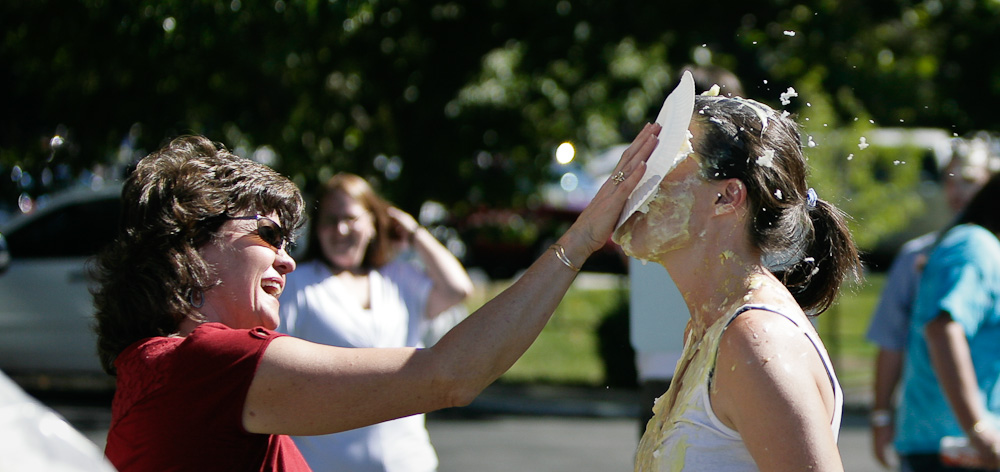
Taking a cream pie in the face for charity

Pieing, or throwing a pie—usually a cream pie—has its origins in the "pie in the face" gag from slapstick comedy. It appears on stage in the music hall sketches of the English theatre impresario Fred Karno. The practice is also used to express disapproval of politicians or other public figures and is sometimes done lightheartedly at charity events, where someone in a position of authority will volunteer to receive a pie in the face from the winning bidder.

== Gallery ==
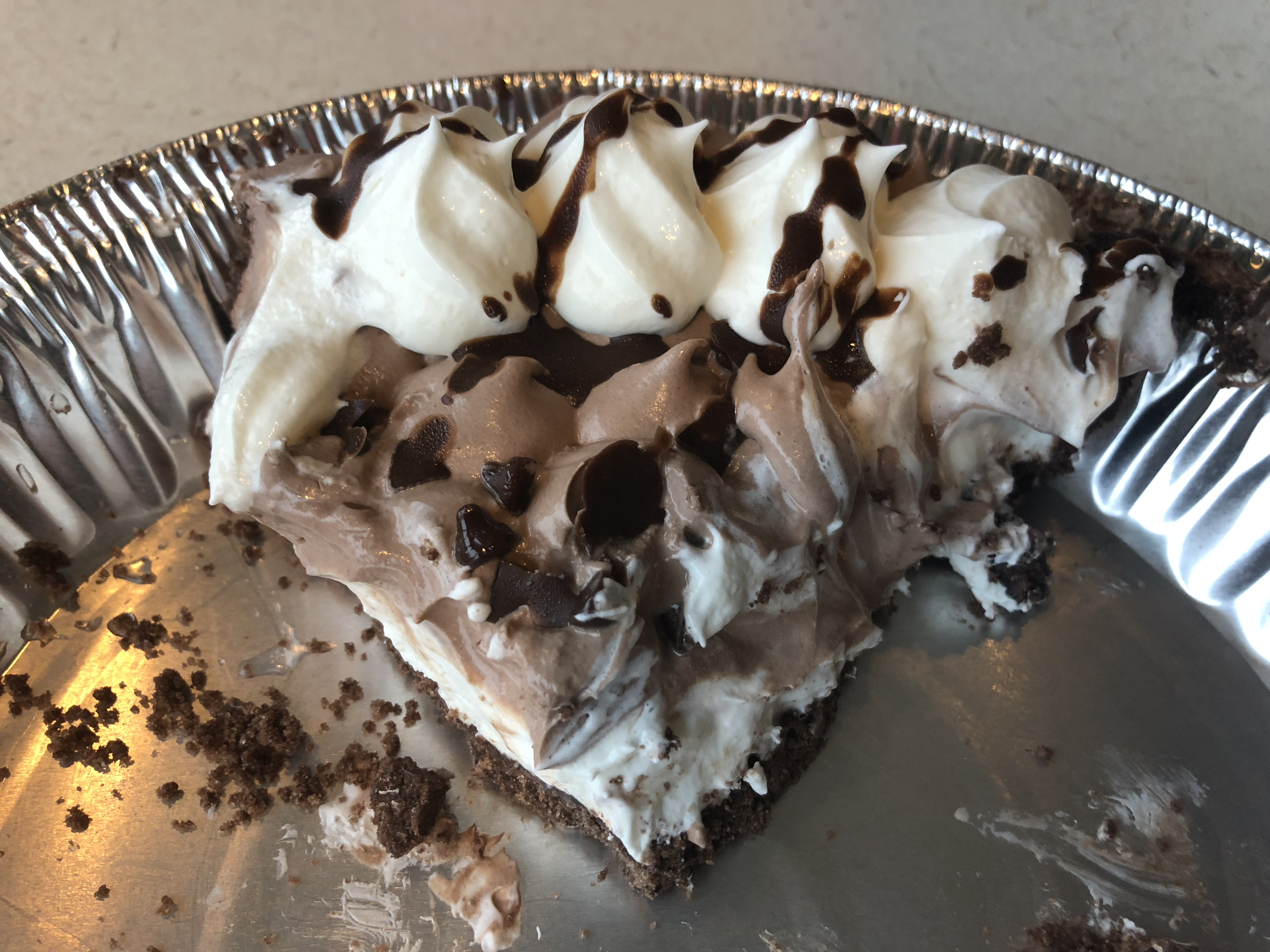
Chocolate Crème Pie

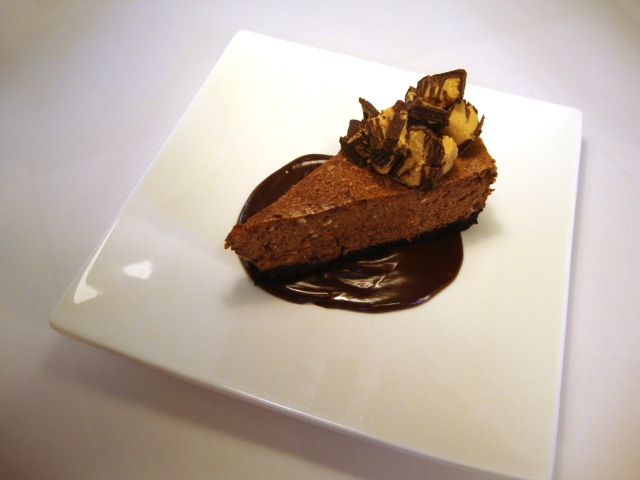
Chocolate cream pie

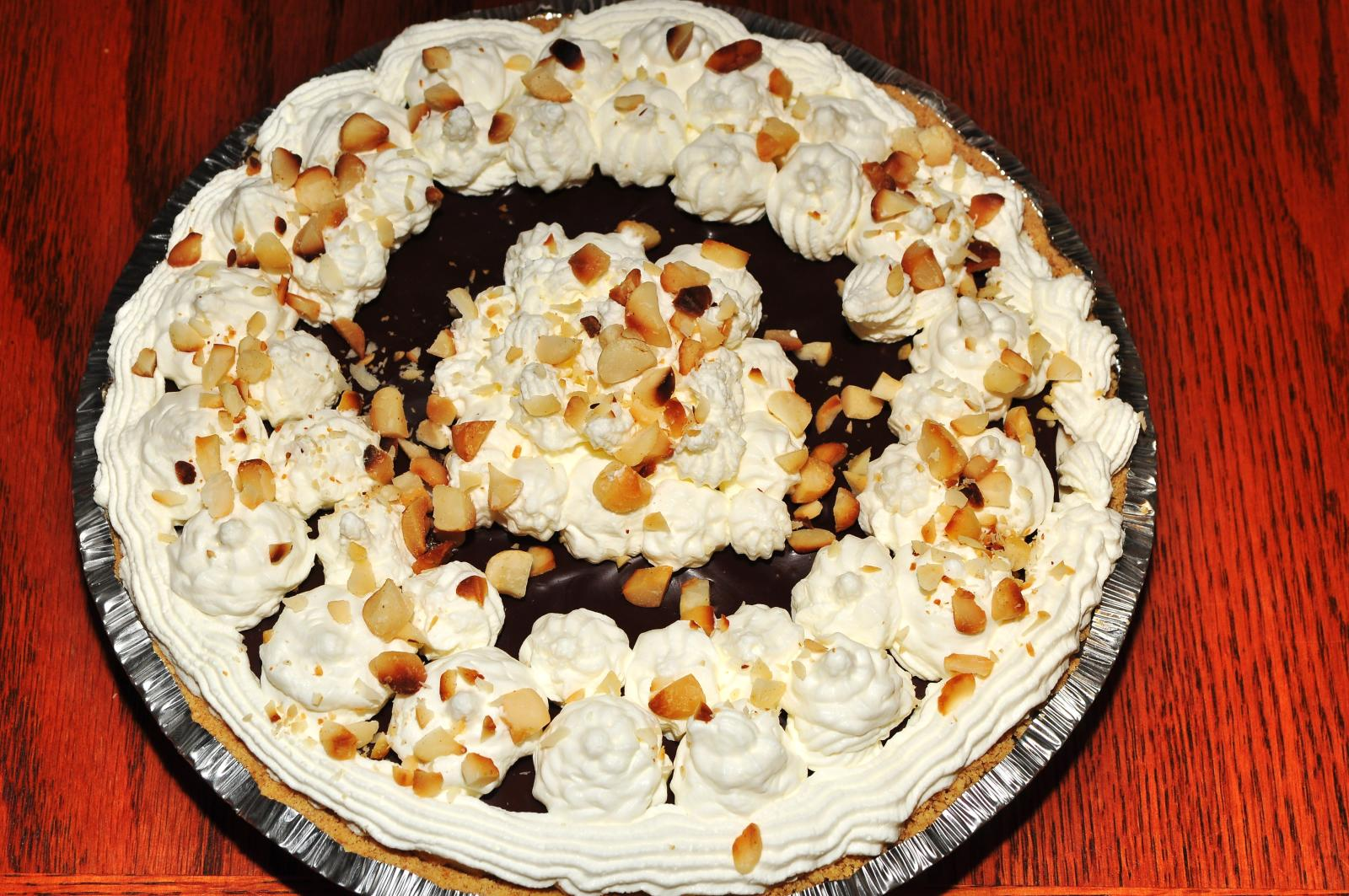
Chocolate cream pie

== Dishes with similar names ==
- Boston cream pie is an American cake that in the past has been referred to locally as a chocolate cream pie

== See also ==
- List of pies, tarts and flans
- Melktert
- Banana cream pie
