= Southern fusion =

American fusion cuisine

Southern fusion is a fusion cuisine that blends or combines cuisine elements from the American southern states or other cultures with traditional Southern cooking. The origin of Southern fusion took place before there was a defining phrase for this pattern of cooking. Traditional southern food has originated from African, European and Hispanic cultures. Due to this fact, Southern fusion usually occurs naturally between different regions and cultures through immigration. Southern fusion cuisine can mean a blend of various Southern styles of cooking, or a blend of Southern style with another style of cooking altogether. Prevalent Southern fusion cuisines include Tex-Mex, although there are countless combinations of cuisines that would fall under the category of Southern fusion. Many modern restaurants in the southern states feature elements of Southern fusion cooking.

== History and Origin ==
The base of Southern fusion cooking is associated with distinct foods and dishes from the southern states of the United States of America. This may include dishes such as, barbecued meats, fried chicken and grits. This also may include agricultural staples such as okra, sweet potatoes, peaches, or collard greens. The first settlers of the south were of English descent and settled the colonies of Maryland, South Carolina, North Carolina and Georgia. Plantations in the American south required African American slaves to do agricultural work, establishing the African American colonial culture. The practice of frying foods can be traced back to African slaves who brought this common way of cooking southern food from their ancestors. African influences on southern cuisine had mostly been looked over until the twentieth century. European countries continued to settle the deep south of America including the French and Spanish in the mid-sixteenth century through the seventeenth century. The Spanish established territories in modern day New Mexico and Florida, while the French had settled in Louisiana.

Thus Cajun cuisine, the French-Arcadian style of cooking, was established in Louisiana. Louisiana Creole cuisine, another prevalent mixing of cultural cuisines, features styles of cooking influenced by West Africans, the French, the Spanish and Haitians.

The origin of Southern fusion existed before the modern name was used to identify the natural outcome of food combining by immigration.

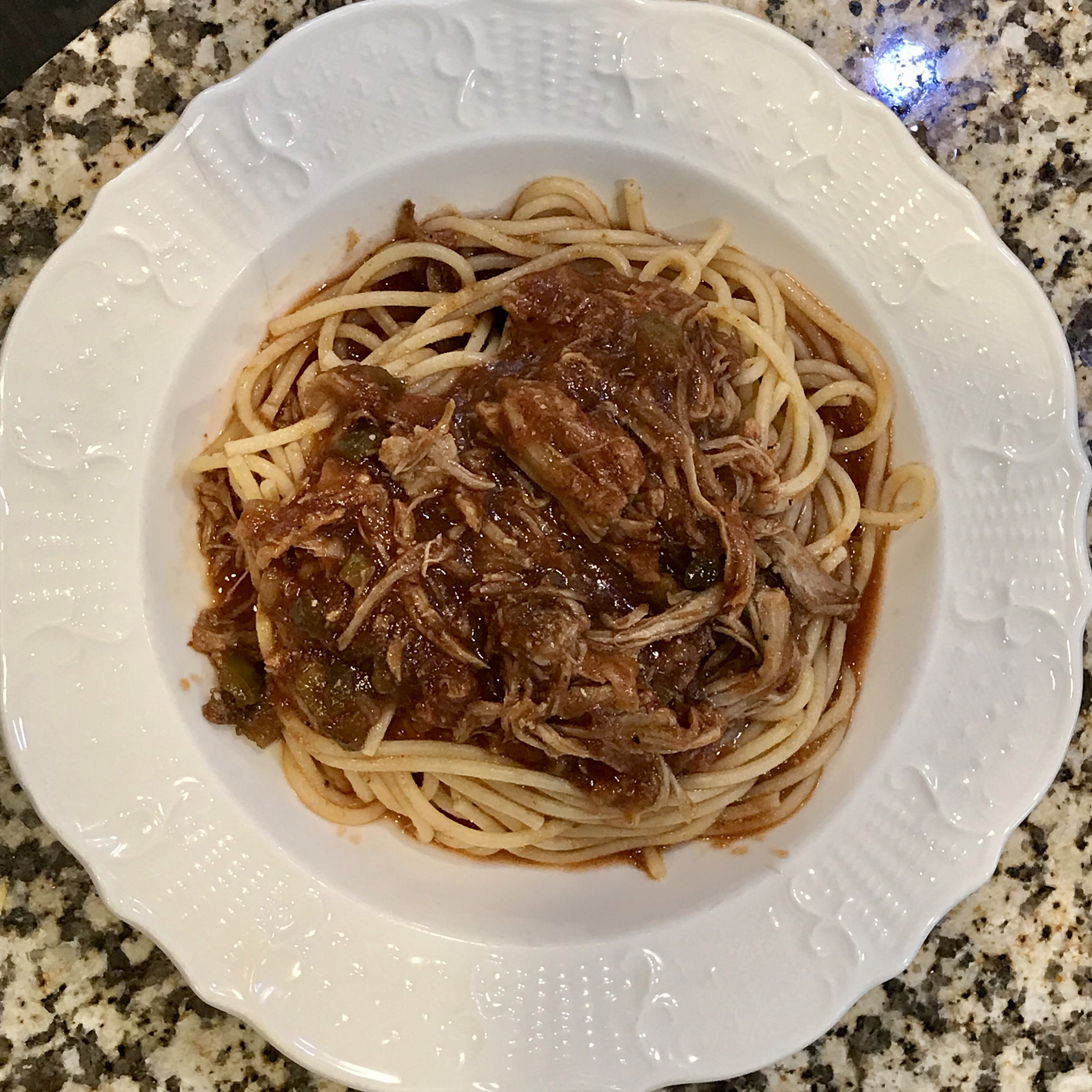
Barbecue Spaghetti A dish combining the Italian dish, spaghetti, with an American southern states style barbecue chicken.

== Modern Southern Fusion Cuisines ==
In southern states the regional Southern fusion cuisine can be used as a reflection of the types of immigrants who live there. In New Orleans, the influence of the French, Lebanese and Italian immigrants can be seen in their food culture. The Hispanic community in the deep south has introduced new flavors to the more rural regions, and coastal cities cuisine of the Southern United States are being influenced by recent Asian immigration. A more modern approach to fusion has been taken to the more purposeful mixing of ingredients, culinary traditions, dishes and methods of cooking. As an example is Floribbean cuisine, the mixing of Caribbean cuisine with Florida's regional southern cuisine. The result emphasizes exotic Caribbean spices, mixed with fresh fruits and garnishes such as lemon grass, ginger and scallions. "Mash-up" or hybridized dishes are also quite popular in Southern fusion with examples such as Thai-mashed potatoes or kimchi tacos. Fusion is not limited to food any may include drinks by putting cultural twists on Southern classics. Many chefs of the southern united states have called southern fusion the flavor of the south due to its deep roots in southern history.

== Cultural Impacts ==
Acculturation of food into indigenous diets from colonization dates what the public knows as Southern fusion. The result was the unintentional bringing together of two different food cultures. As a contemporary movement, fusion food aims to embrace multiculturalism and transculturation. Eating is an inherently cultural experience and fusion style of cooking has been said to encourage the blend of foods in a creative manner. Chef and scholar, Adrian Miller, calls Southern fusion and soul food an "immigrant cuisine" to emphasize the many influences that traditional Southern cuisine comes from.

== See also ==
American Cuisines

Tex-Mex

New Mexican Cuisine

Creole Cuisine

Cajun Cuisine

Southern Cuisine
