= Cuisine of Florida =

Culinary traditions of Florida

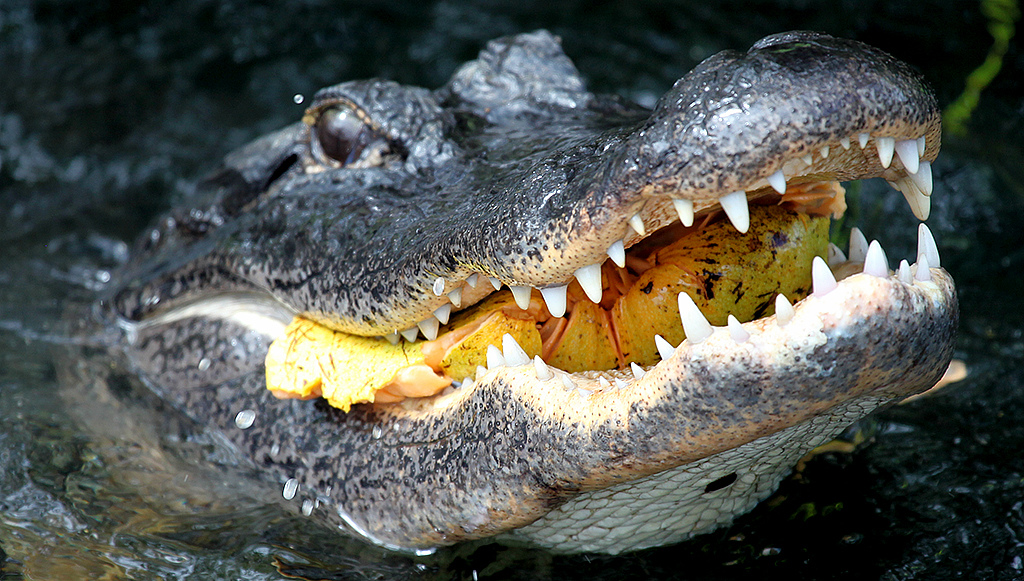
An American alligator eating a pond apple

The cuisine of Florida is a diverse blend of Southern, Caribbean, Latin American, and seafood-based culinary traditions found in Florida, reflecting the state's multicultural population, subtropical climate, and coastal geography.

== History ==
=== Early history ===
The native Timucua culture farmed and fished in north central and northeast Florida. They prepared a black tea called "black drink" (or "white drink" because of its purifying effects), which served a ceremonial purpose, and was a highly caffeinated Cassina tea, brewed from the leaves of the yaupon holly tree.

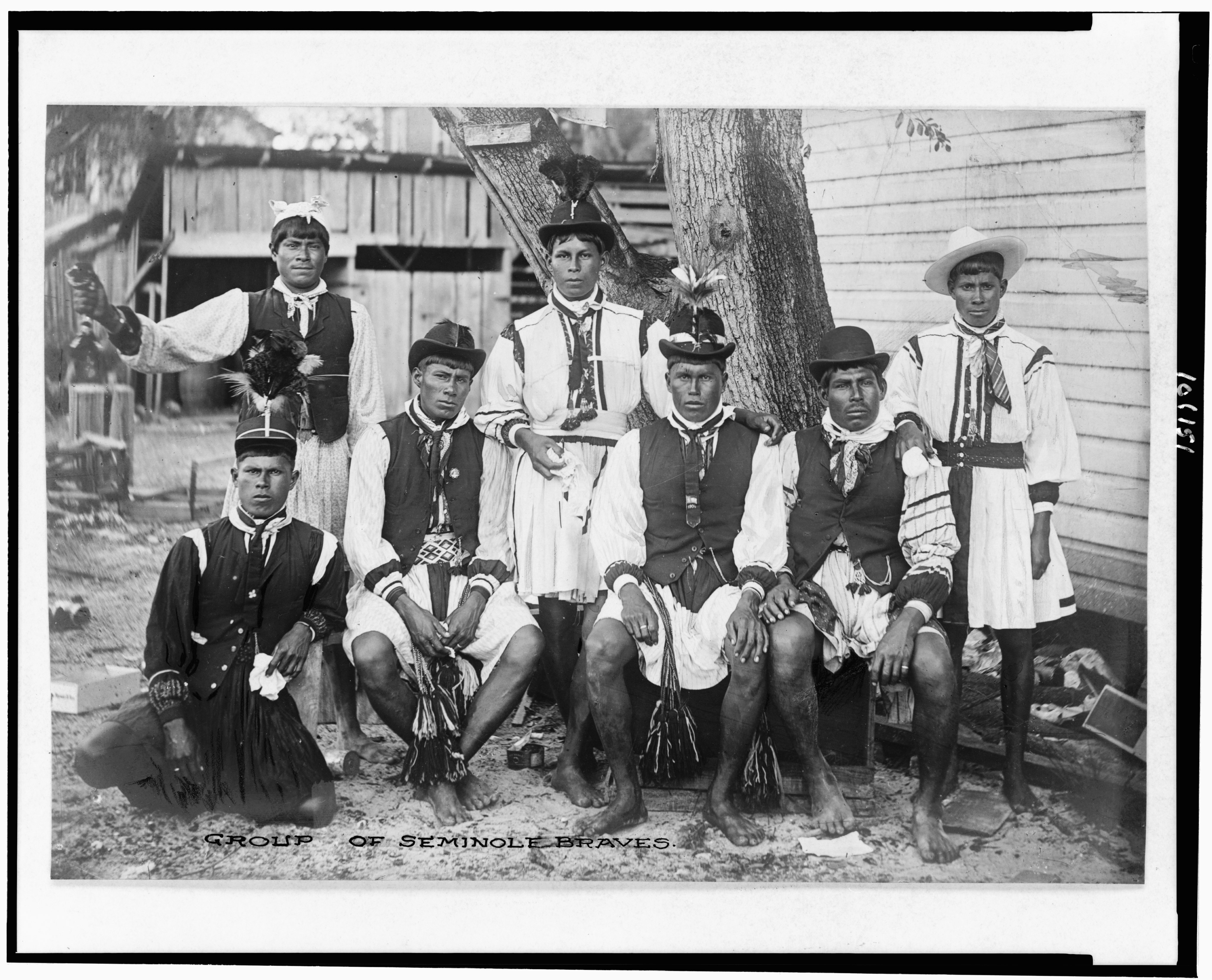
Group of Seminole braves

Later on, when the Seminole people settled in South Florida, they brought in their own unique food practices that reflected the resources and environment surrounding them. The Seminole tribe was innovative in the way that they used coontie seeds to produce calorie-dense bread. Cabbage palm was noticeably consumed by the Seminole tribe along with nutritionally rich foods like nuts, berries, and corn which was especially significant for their annual tradition of the Green Corn Ceremony. They also produced a diverse array of bananas like dwarf bananas, red bananas, and grey bananas.

The Spanish first brought citrus to Florida in the 16th century, and orange groves started being an important commercial industry for the state in the 1870s.

=== Modern history ===
In the 1950s, following the Cuban Revolution, a significant influx of Cuban refugees came to South Florida and influenced the food scene, especially in Miami. The arrival of several waves of Caribbean, Hispanic, and Asian immigrants to Florida since the late 19th century has played an important role in the development of its cuisine.

== Dishes ==
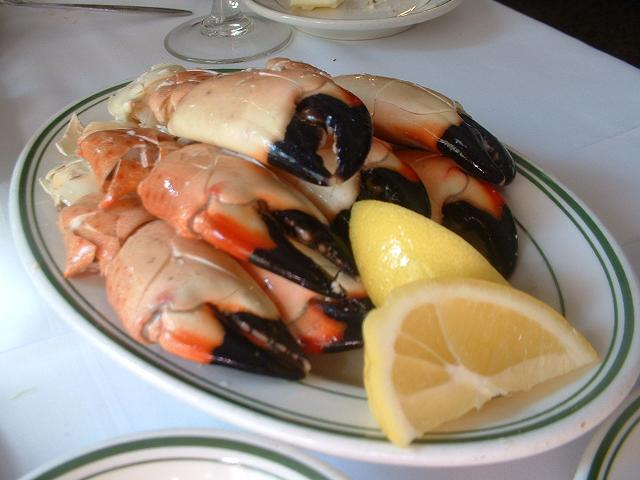
Florida stone crabs

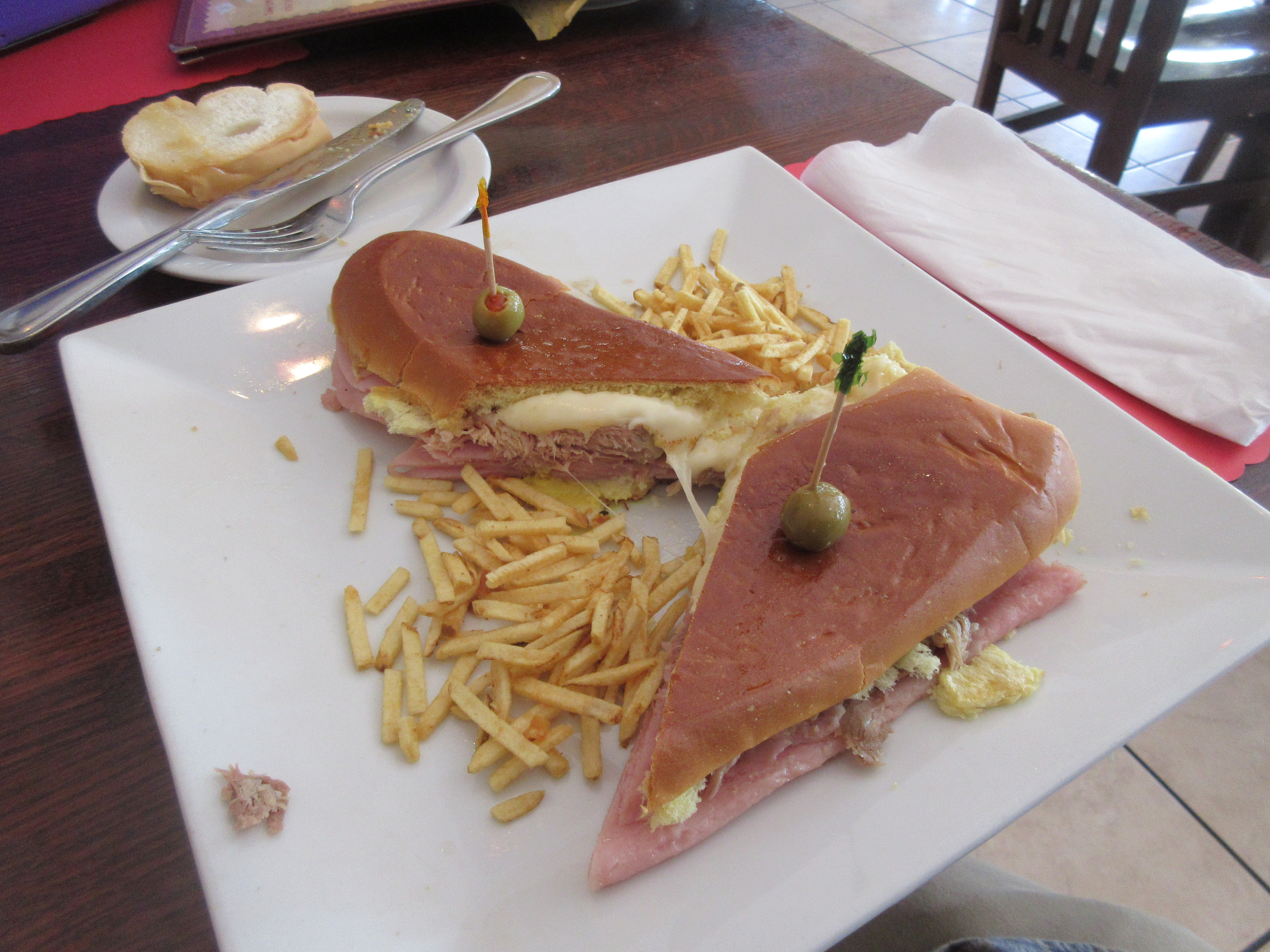
A Cuban sandwich from Little Havana, Miami

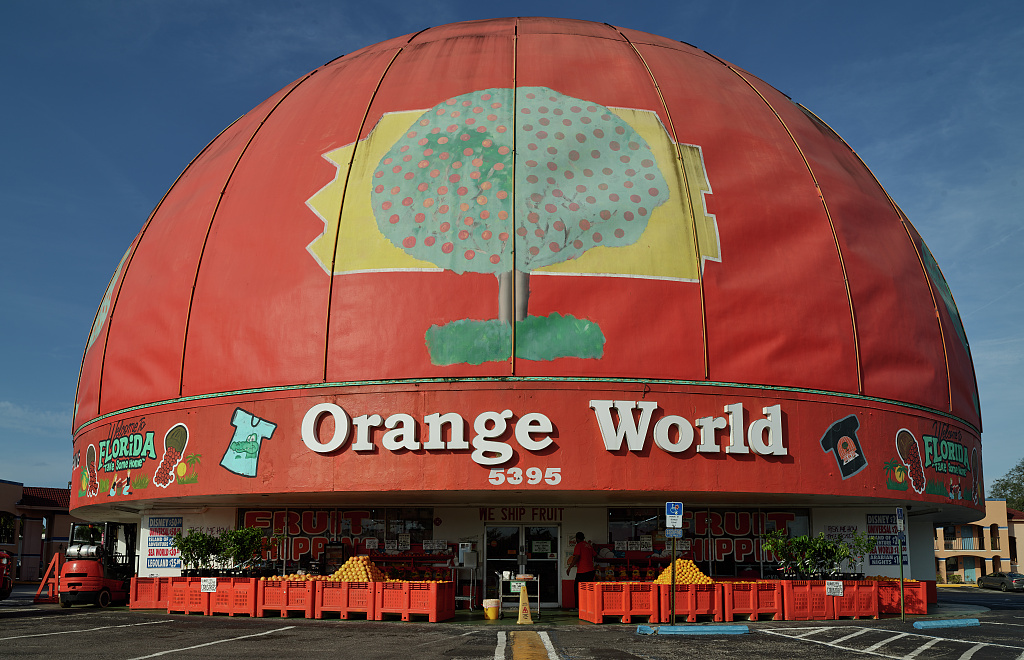
Gift shop in Kissimmee

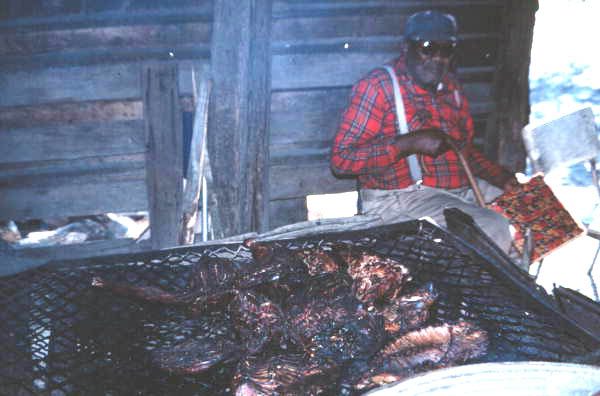
Barbecue in Lake City

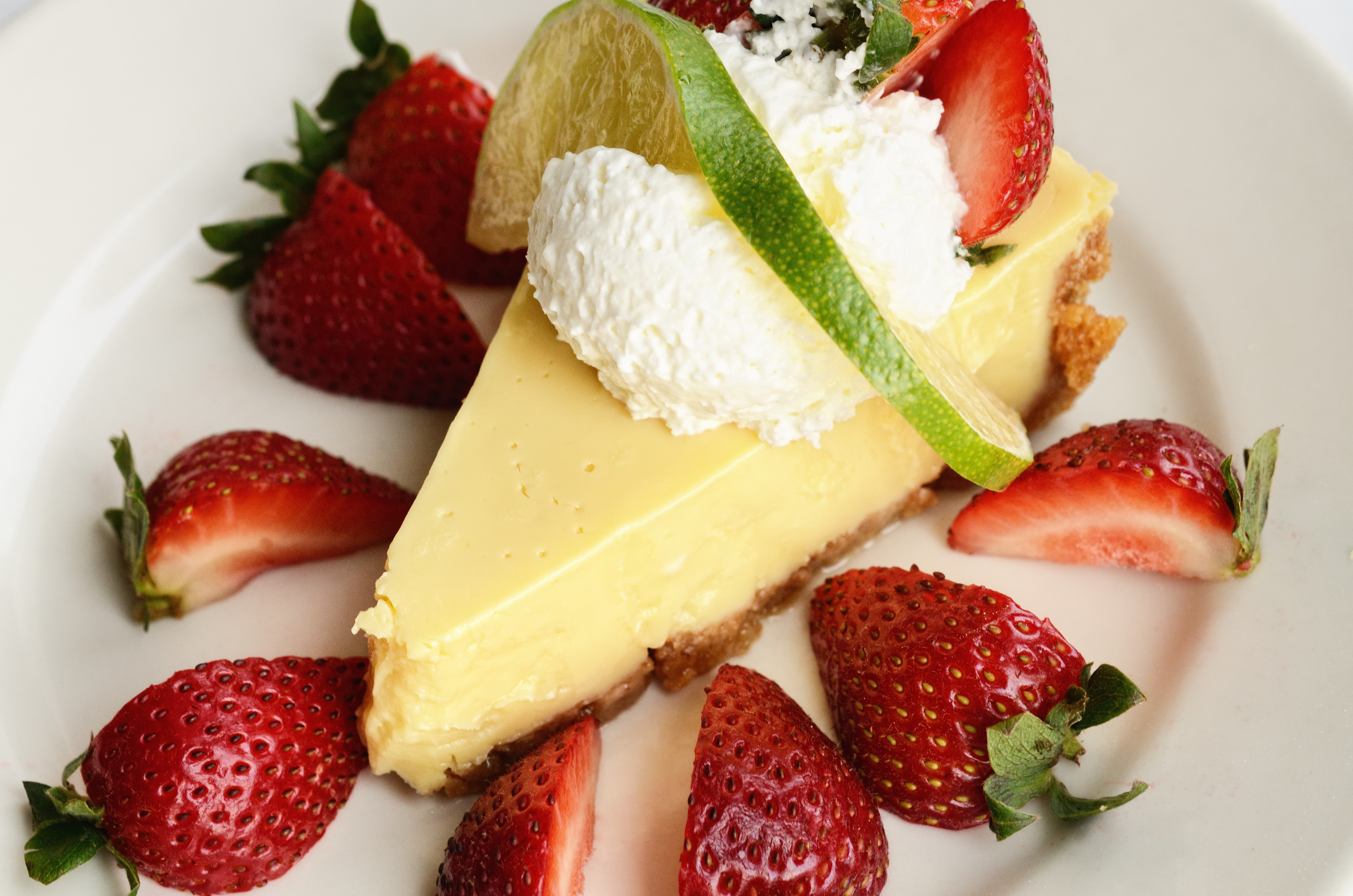
Key lime pie, popular in Key West

=== Seafood ===
- Conch, prepared as conch fritters, conch salad, or conch soup.
- Deviled crab, a crab meat croquette, originated in Tampa.
- Oysters from Apalachicola Bay, which previously accounted for 90% of Floridian oyster consumption.
- Florida stone crabs
- Smoked fish, prepared for example as smoked mullet dip.
- Shrimp, especially Atlantic white shrimp from areas such as Mayport near Jacksonville or Daytona Beach. Also popular in South Florida as coconut shrimp.
- Grits and grunts
- Minorcan clam chowder, a dish from St. Augustine made with locally grown datil peppers.
- Grouper sandwich, popular in Tampa.

=== Other ===
- Cuban sandwiches, originating in either Tampa or Key West, are also popular in Miami. Other Cuban foods, such as Cuban coffee and pastries with guava, are especially common in the Little Havana neighborhood of Miami.
- Alligator meat, such as fried gator, gator bites, or gator tail.
- Floribbean-style barbecue
- Key lime pie made with the juice of Key limes that are found throughout the Florida Keys and a graham cracker crust. In 2006, it became the official state pie.
- Boiled peanuts are commonly sold by roadside vendors in north and central Florida.
- Swamp cabbage, a Florida cracker dish made with sabal palm.
- Coconut patties, a type of candy made from shredded coconut pressed into a round or square shape and coated in chocolate.

== Edible plants ==
Sea grapes are edible. Parts of the Bidens alba (Spanish needles) can be eaten and properly prepared poke salad is a traditional dish. Wood sorrel is another edible "weed".

== Oranges ==
Citrus fruit, especially oranges, are a major part of Florida's economy. Orange juice became the official state beverage in 1967. Oranges are also Florida's state fruit and the orange blossom is the state flower. According to the Florida Department of Citrus, the citrus industry employs over 32,500 people and provides an annual economic impact of $6.9 billion to the state.

Sour oranges were used to make pies and grow "wild".

== Restaurants ==
Versailles is a famous Cuban restaurant and Bakery in Miami's Little Havana neighborhood.

Columbia in Ybor City is the oldest continuously operated restaurant in the state as well as the nation's oldest Spanish restaurant.

Pollo Tropical, a chain restaurant specializing in Floribbean-style grilled chicken, originated in the Miami area, and has since spread internationally.

Miami Grill is a restaurant chain, with the majority of restaurants in Miami-Dade, Broward, and Palm Beach counties of Florida.

Several chains are Florida based including First Watch, Melting Pot, Millers Ale House, Hooters, Twistee Treat, Seasons 52, 4 Rivers Smokehouse, and Sonny's.

== Food festivals ==
The Epcot International Food & Wine Festival is an annual food festival at Epcot, in the Walt Disney World Resort in Bay Lake, Florida.

The Florida Strawberry Festival is one of Florida's oldest and most popular food festivals located in Plant City, Florida. It celebrates strawberry harvest with events, strawberry-themed dishes, concerts, and community traditions. It takes place annually in mid-March drawing in hundreds of thousands of visitors.

The Great Atlantic Seafood Festival takes place in Jacksonville, Florida each year in March. It features seafood dishes that come fried, broiled, boiled, grilled or blackened. Along with this, there is music, arts and crafts, rides and games.

== Other ==
Publix is a major grocery store throughout the state of Florida with headquarters in Winter Haven, where the grocery chain originated. Publix subs, or Pub subs, are popular submarine sandwiches that can be made at the stores' deli counters.

Miami Beach is an American cocktail, made from gin, pineapple juice, and cane syrup, named after the resort city in South Florida.

Old Sour is a sauce and salad dressing used in the Bahamas and Key West, Florida.

Florida is home to major red mango cultivars, such as the Haden variety.

== Gallery ==
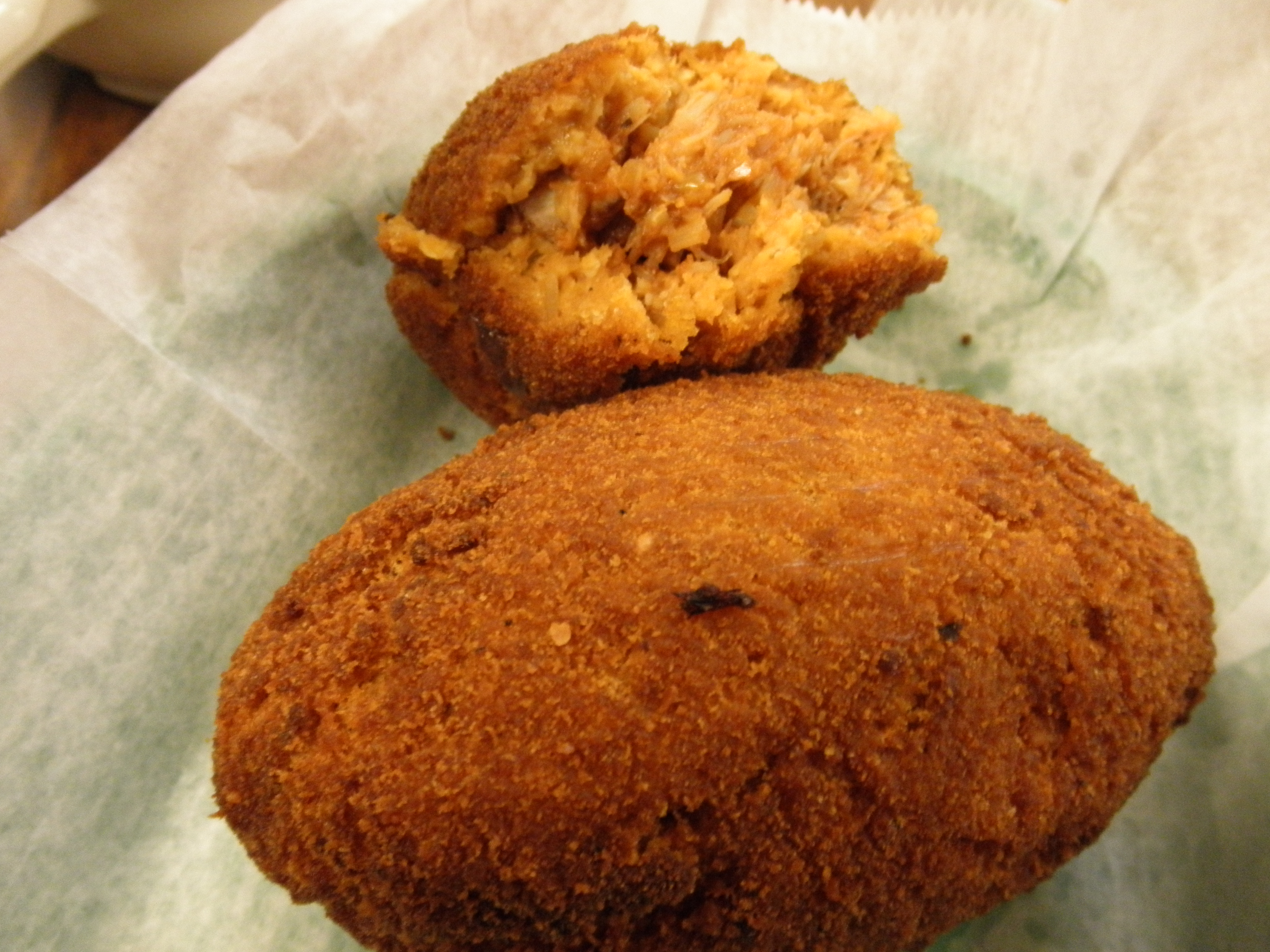
Deviled crabs, originally from Tampa Bay

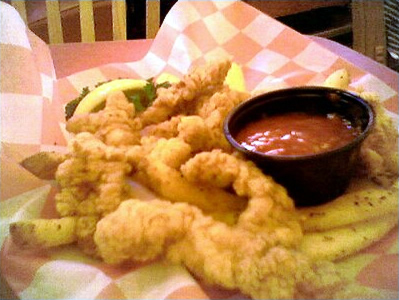
Fried gator tail

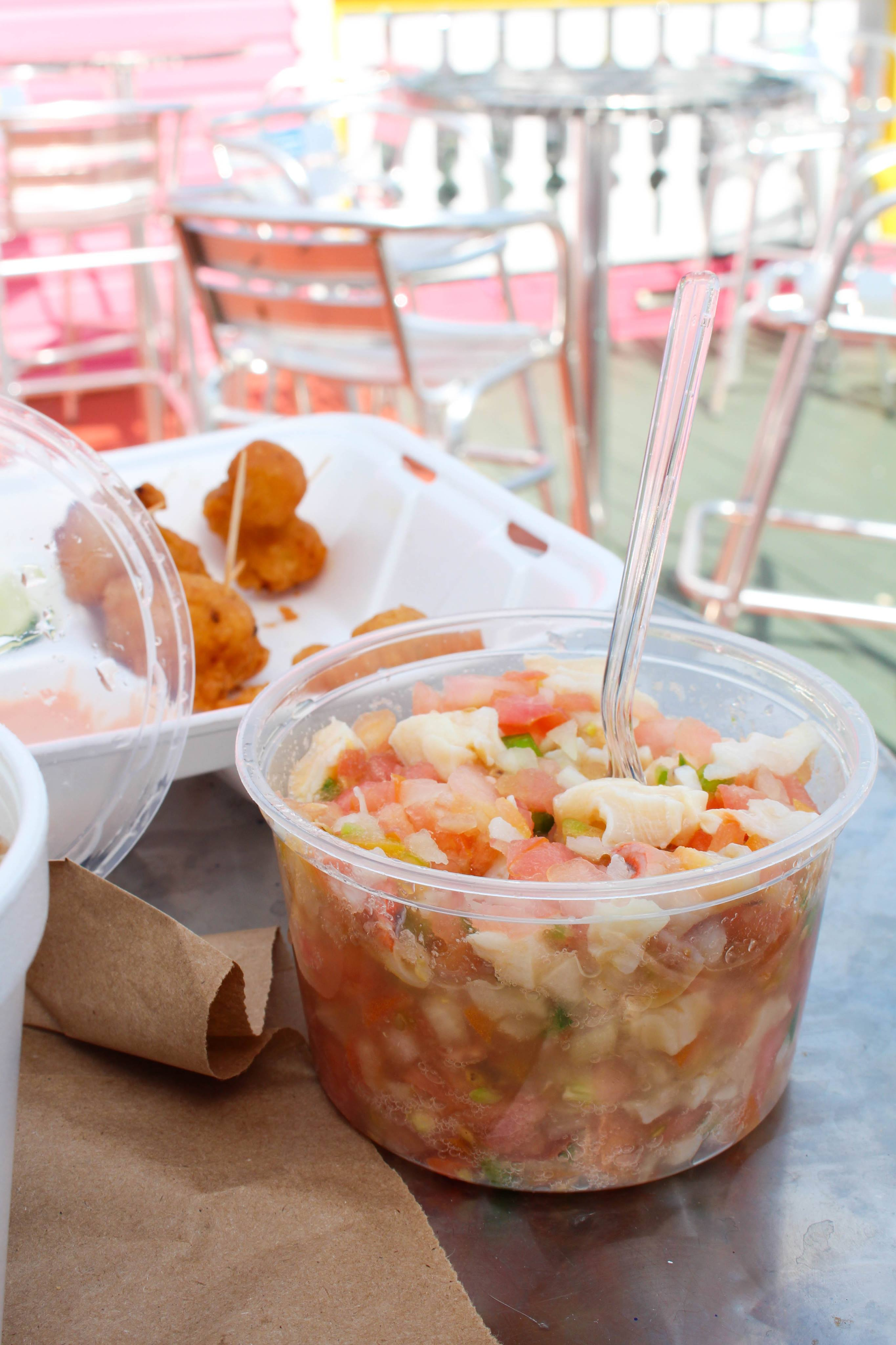
Conch salad

== See also ==
- Media related to Cuisine of Florida at Wikimedia Commons
- Floribbean cuisine
