= William J. Curry =

American businessman

William Joseph Curry (September 11, 1821 – January 24, 1896) was a Key West businessman and Florida's first millionaire.

== Biography ==
William Joseph Curry was born in 1821 on Green Turtle Cay in the Bahamas. He arrived in Key West from the Bahamas in 1837 at age 16. Like many "conchs", he was a poor white Bahamian who immigrated to Key West for economic opportunity. When he arrived in Key West, it was then the wealthiest town in the state.

Curry started in Key West as a clerk in the office of Weever & Baldwin. After fighting in the Seminole War for several years, he returned to Key West and climbed the corporate ladder. Over the next forty years, he built an empire of merchandising, wrecking, and shipbuilding.

Curry married Euphemia Lowe in 1844, and together they had eight children. When he died in 1896, Curry's estate was worth $1.5 million. He was Florida's first self-made millionaire and the richest man in the state.

== Curry Mansions ==
William Curry built the Curry home in 1855. Urban legend holds that the Curry kitchen was the birthplace of the original key lime pie, created by a cook known as Aunt Sally.

In 1905, Curry's son Milton demolished and rebuilt the home as a Victorian mansion that still stands today. The wood used in the home is Dade County Pine, like other homes of wealthy conchs at that time. In 1920, the house passed from the Curry family to a cousin. In 1975, Edith and Al Amsterdam bought and renovated the Curry Mansion and turned it into a bed and breakfast.

Seven of Curry's eight children who lived past infancy built mansions of their own on the island of Key West for themselves or their children. These mansions include the Woman's Club, Dr. Joseph Yates Porter House, the Robert Oliver Curry Mansion, the George Curry Mansion, the Southernmost Mansion, and the Fogarty Mansion. The Fogarty mansion is directly adjacent to the Curry Mansion and is currently the home of both Fogarty's Restaurant and Flying Monkeys bar. Today, the mansions function as gathering places, historic places, apartments, inns, and restaurants.
