= Floribbean cuisine =

Culinary traditions of Florida

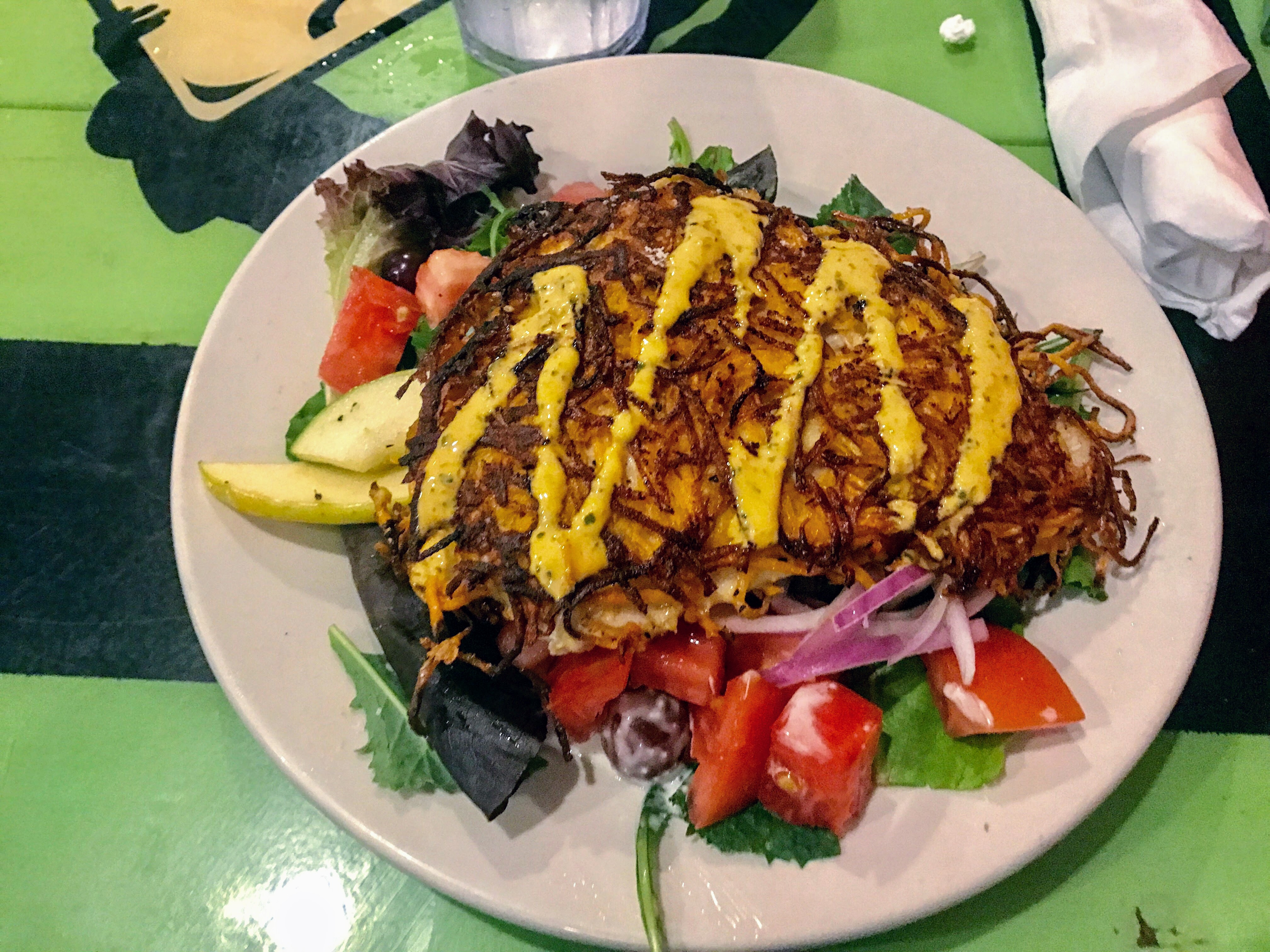
Sweet potato crusted salmon on salad with ranch style dressing

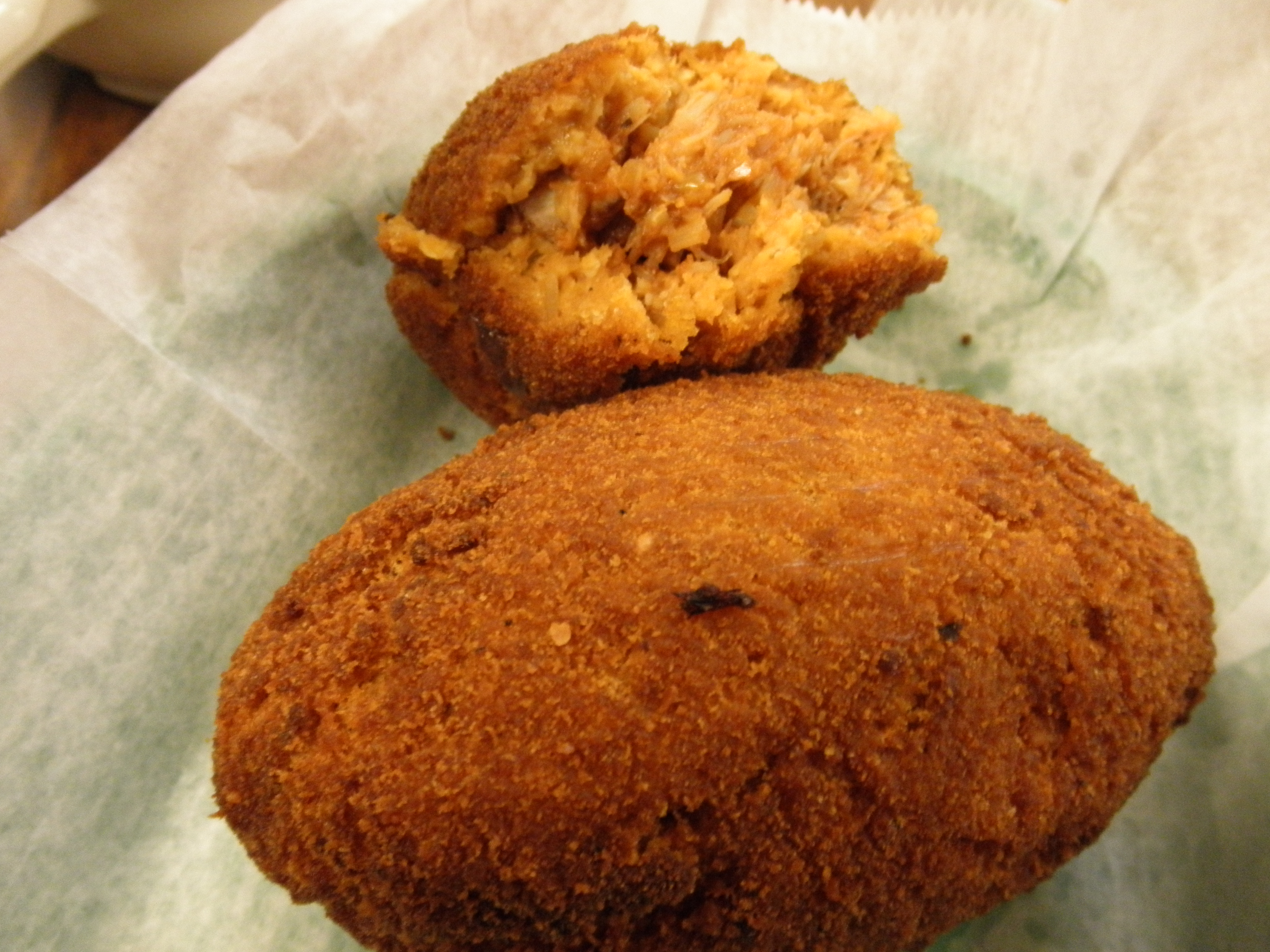
Deviled crabs

Floribbean cuisine refers to a fusion cuisine found in Florida with an emphasis on fresh regional ingredients and complex medleys of spices, especially strong flavors offset by milder ones. Floribbean-style cooking incorporates an exotic spice pantry: red curry, lemongrass, ginger, and scallions are as commonly used today in Floribbean cookery as grits and cobbler are in other parts of Florida. Foundationally, its bedrock is Conch, Black, Spanish and Cuban regional cooking, with heavy Asian influences.

== History and influences ==
In the 1950s, following the Cuban Revolution, a significant influx of Cuban refugees to South Florida spurred the development of Floribbean cuisine. Early advocates were characterized by the so-called "Mango Gang," a group of South Florida chefs that included Norman Van Aken, Mark Militello, Douglas Rodriguez, and Allen Susser, who advocated the use of fresh local ingredients with Caribbean influences. Following a second influx of Cuban immigrants in the 1980s, these chefs and others in the state formalized Floribbean cuisine. It is influenced by Latin American cuisine, Caribbean cuisine, Cuban cuisine, soul food, Jamaican cuisine, Puerto Rican cuisine, Haitian cuisine, Bahamian cuisine, Jewish cuisine, and Asian cuisine. According to Van Aken, Floribbean cuisine was an inspiration for modern fusion cuisine, having coined the phrase in a 1988 letter describing his plan to “salvage the golden treasures and vibrant calypso flavors of old Key West and fusing them with a contemporary sensibility and an individual personality".

Typical features of Floribbean cuisine include an emphasis on fresh ingredients and complex medleys of spices, especially strong flavors offset by milder ones. Floribbean cooking often uses less spicy heat than the Caribbean dishes that inspire it, but there is extensive use of several kinds of peppers. This pungency, however, is almost always moderated by the use of mango, papaya, rum, almond, coconut, key lime, or honey.

As Floribbean cuisine evolved in South Florida it was strongly influenced by Asian culinary principles emphasizing the use of locally harvested Asian fruits and vegetables that will grow only in tropical and subtropical parts of the continental United States, where it rarely freezes.

Latin-Floribbean cuisine mixes Floribbean cuisine with Latin-American cuisine, resulting in strong Cuban, Puerto Rican, and Dominican influences.

== See also ==
- Cuisine of Florida
- Cuisine of the Southern United States

== Bibliography ==
- Hartz, Deborah (2004). "What Goes Around..." South Florida Sun Sentinel. March 25.
- Lang, John (2007). "America, the Melting Pot." Foodservice Director. August 15.
- Parseghian, Pamela (2002). "Hunger for new tastes drives Caribbean menu influences." Nation's Restaurant News.
- Richman, Alan (2004). Fork it over: the Intrepid Adventures of a Professional Eater. New York: HarperCollins.
- Bennett, Michael (2009) "In the Land of Misfits, Pirates and Cooks". The Professional Image
