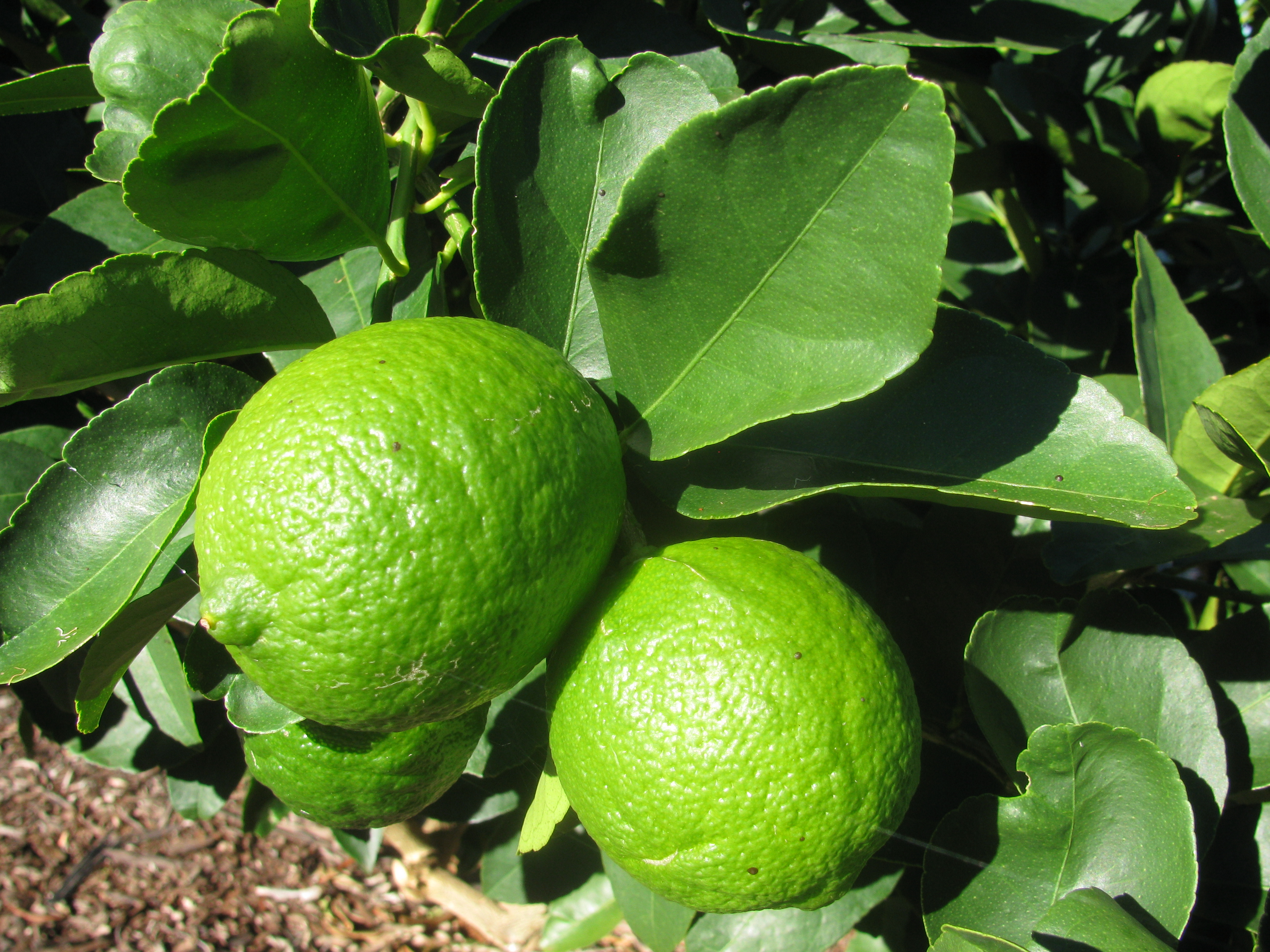
- Limes on the tree

Scientific classification
- Kingdom: Plantae
- Clade: Tracheophytes
- Clade: Angiosperms
- Clade: Eudicots
- Clade: Rosids
- Order: Sapindales
- Family: Rutaceae
- Genus: Citrus
- Species: C. × latifolia

Binomial name
- Citrus × latifolia (Yu.Tanaka) Yu.Tanaka

Synonyms
- Citrus aurantiifolia var. latifolia Yu.Tanaka

= Persian lime =

Species of fruit and plant

Persian lime (Citrus × latifolia), also known by other common names such as seedless lime, Bearss lime, and Tahiti lime, is a citrus fruit species of hybrid origin, known only in cultivation. The Persian lime is a triploid cross between Key lime (Citrus × aurantiifolia) and lemon (Citrus × limon).

Although there are other citrus species that are referred to as "limes", the Persian lime is the most widely cultivated lime species commercially, and accounts for the largest share of the fruits sold as limes. The fruit turns yellow as it ripens, but it is universally sold while still green.

== Description ==
The tree is a triploid cross between Key lime (Citrus x aurantiifolia) and lemon (Citrus x limon). It is nearly thornless. The fruit is about 6 cm (2 1/2 in) in diameter, often with slightly nippled ends, and is usually sold while green, although it yellows as it reaches full ripeness. It is larger, thicker-skinned, with less intense citrus aromatics than the Key lime. The advantages of the Persian lime in commercial agriculture compared to the key lime are the larger size, absence of seeds, hardiness, absence of thorns on the bushes, and longer fruit shelf life. They are less acidic than Key limes and do not have the bitterness that lends to the key lime's unique flavor.

== Cultivation ==
Persian limes were first grown on a large scale in Iran and southern Iraq.

The trees are propagated clonally, by grafting or air layering. Persian limes are commercialized primarily in six sizes, known as 110s, 150s, 175s, 200s, 230s and 250s. Large numbers of Persian limes are grown, processed, and exported every year primarily from Mexico to the American, European and Asian markets. In 2014, Brazil was the major exporter of fresh limes to Europe (about 70%) with Mexico supplying most of the remainder.

=== Cultivars ===
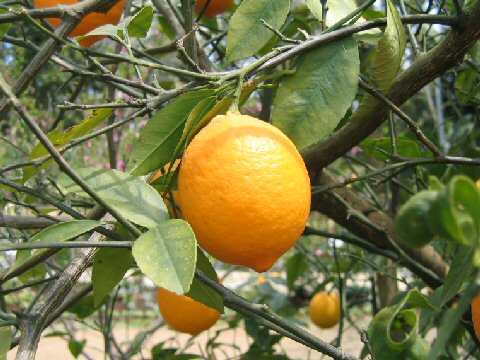
ripe Citrus × latifolia

Cultivars include:

- Bearss lime (named after John T. Bearss, who developed this seedless variety about 1895 in his nursery at Porterville, California)
- Page lime
- Persian lime SPB-7
- Pond's lime
- Tahiti lime

== Uses ==
It is widely available dried, as it is often used this way in Persian cuisine.
