= Jane Ellison (Borden) =

Fictional character created by Borden, Inc.

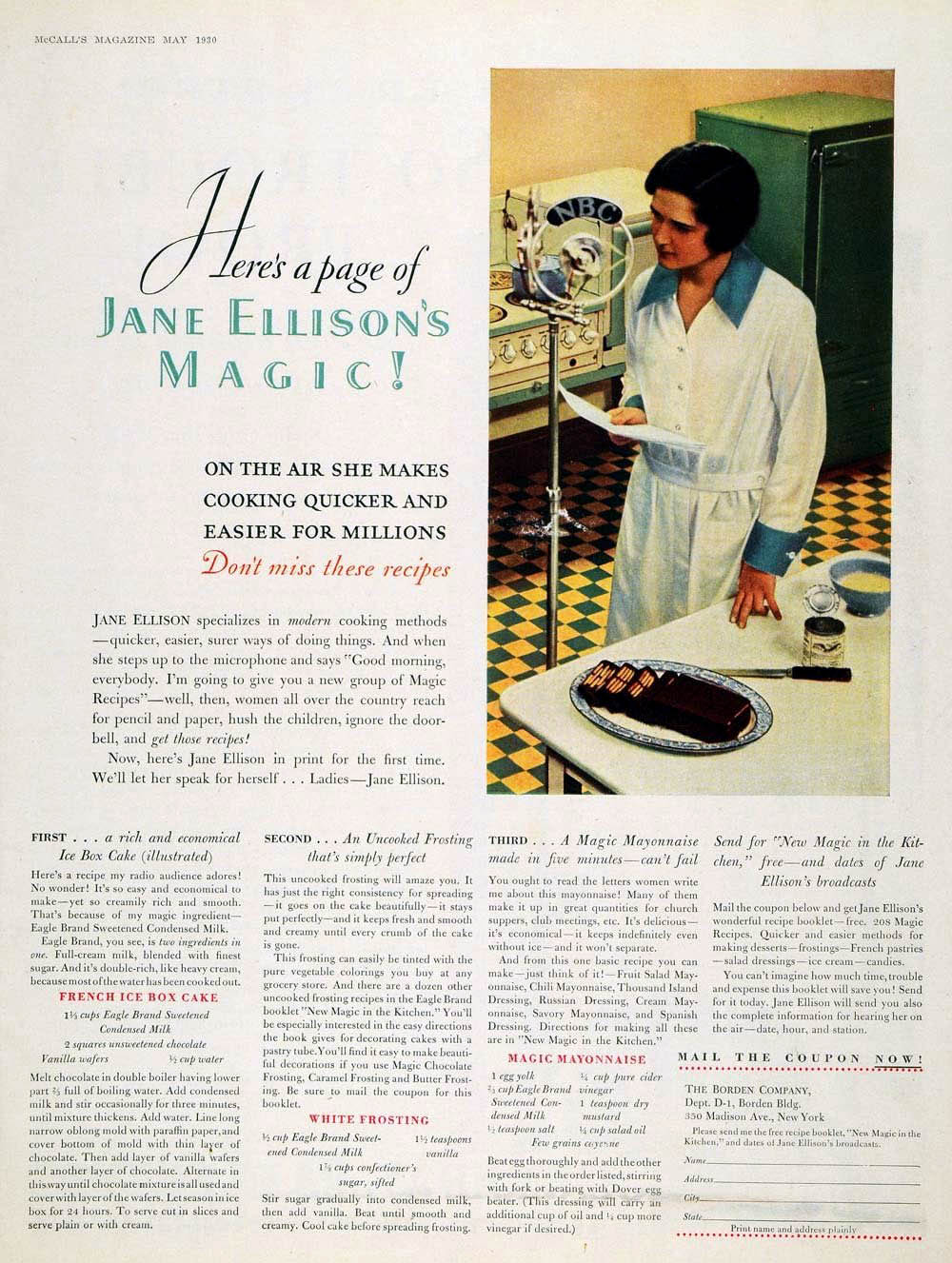
Jane Ellison featured on a magazine advertisement in 1930

Jane Ellison was a fictional character created in the 1920s by the US food company Borden to promote its Eagle Brand condensed milk. Jane, called a "culinary expert", promoted her "Magic Recipes" in magazine articles, on the radio, and in her 1930s pamphlets Magic! The most amazing short-cuts in cooking you ever heard of and New magic in the kitchen: quick, easy recipes made with sweetened condensed milk.

The name Jane Ellison was used for the club secretary of the Borden Recipe Club, actually various employees of the advertising department, and signed all the bulletins of the club. Like Betty Crocker, she was also used as the contact point for consumers and signed correspondence with consumers.

Her "Magic!" book is especially notable for its "Magic Lemon Cream Pie (uncooked filling)", the ancestor of Key lime pie.
