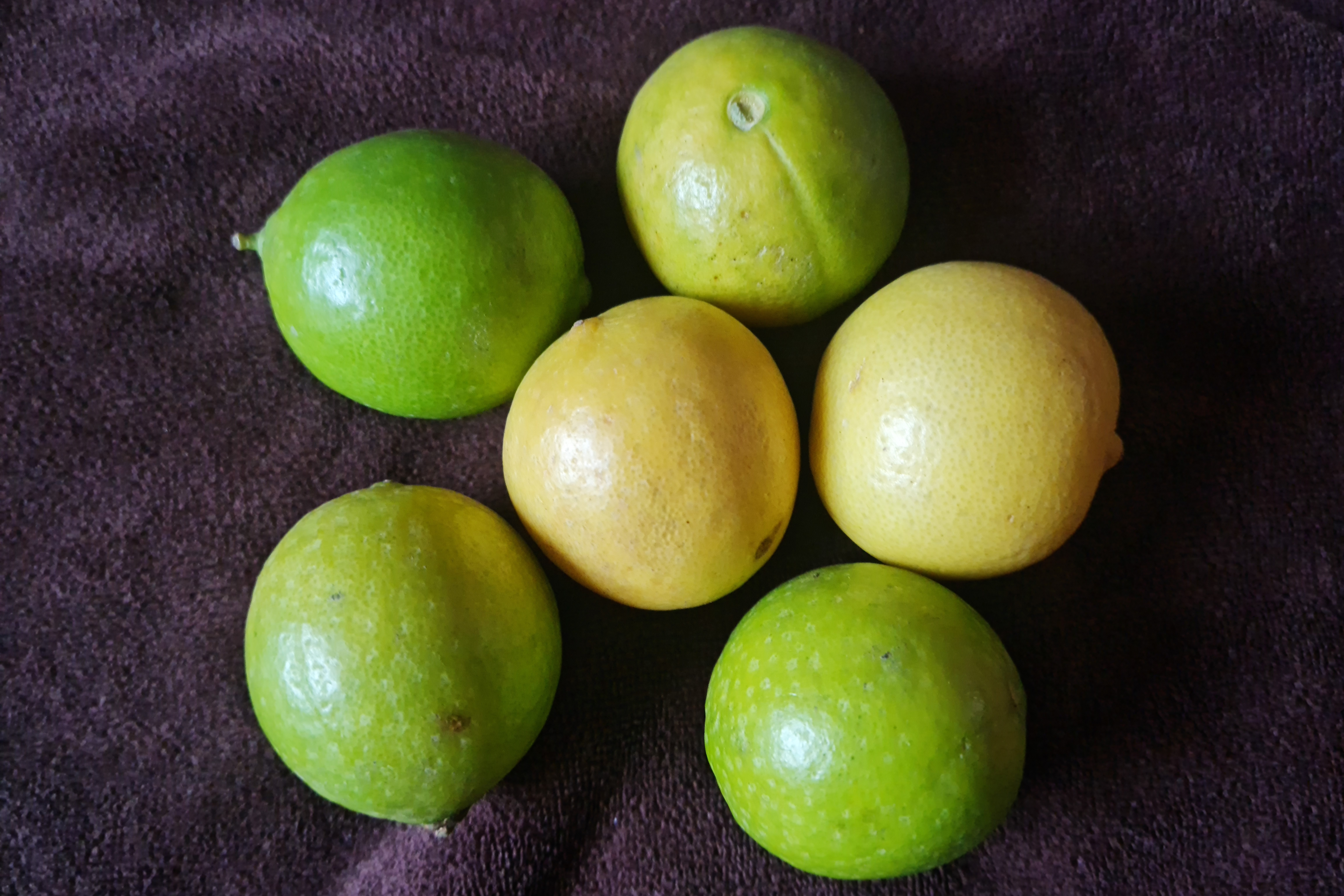

Scientific classification
- Kingdom: Plantae
- Clade: Tracheophytes
- Clade: Angiosperms
- Clade: Eudicots
- Clade: Rosids
- Order: Sapindales
- Family: Rutaceae
- Genus: Citrus
- Species: C. × aurantiifolia

Binomial name
- Citrus × aurantiifolia (Christm.) Swingle

= Key lime =

Citrus fruit and plant

The Key lime, also known as Egyptian lime, Mexican lime, or West Indian lime (Citrus × aurantiifolia) is a type of lime. While it is treated as a species in botanical classification, it originated as a natural hybrid between Citrus micrantha (a wild papeda) and Citrus medica (citron).

The Key lime has thinner rind and is smaller, seedier, more acidic, and more aromatic than the Persian lime (Citrus × latifolia). It is valued for its characteristic flavor. The name comes from its association with the Florida Keys, where it is best known as the namesake flavoring ingredient in Key lime pie. The Key lime is not to be confused with bartender's lime or the Omani lime, which are slightly different. The last is classified as a distinct race, with a thicker skin and darker green color. Philippine varieties have various names such as dayap and bilolo.

== Etymology ==
The English word lime was derived, via Spanish then French, from the Arabic word ليمة līma, which is, in turn, a derivation of the Persian word limu لیمو. Key is from Florida Keys, where the fruit was naturalized. The earliest known use of the name is from 1905, where the fruit was described as "the finest on the market. It is aromatic, juicy, and highly superior to the lemon".

== Description ==
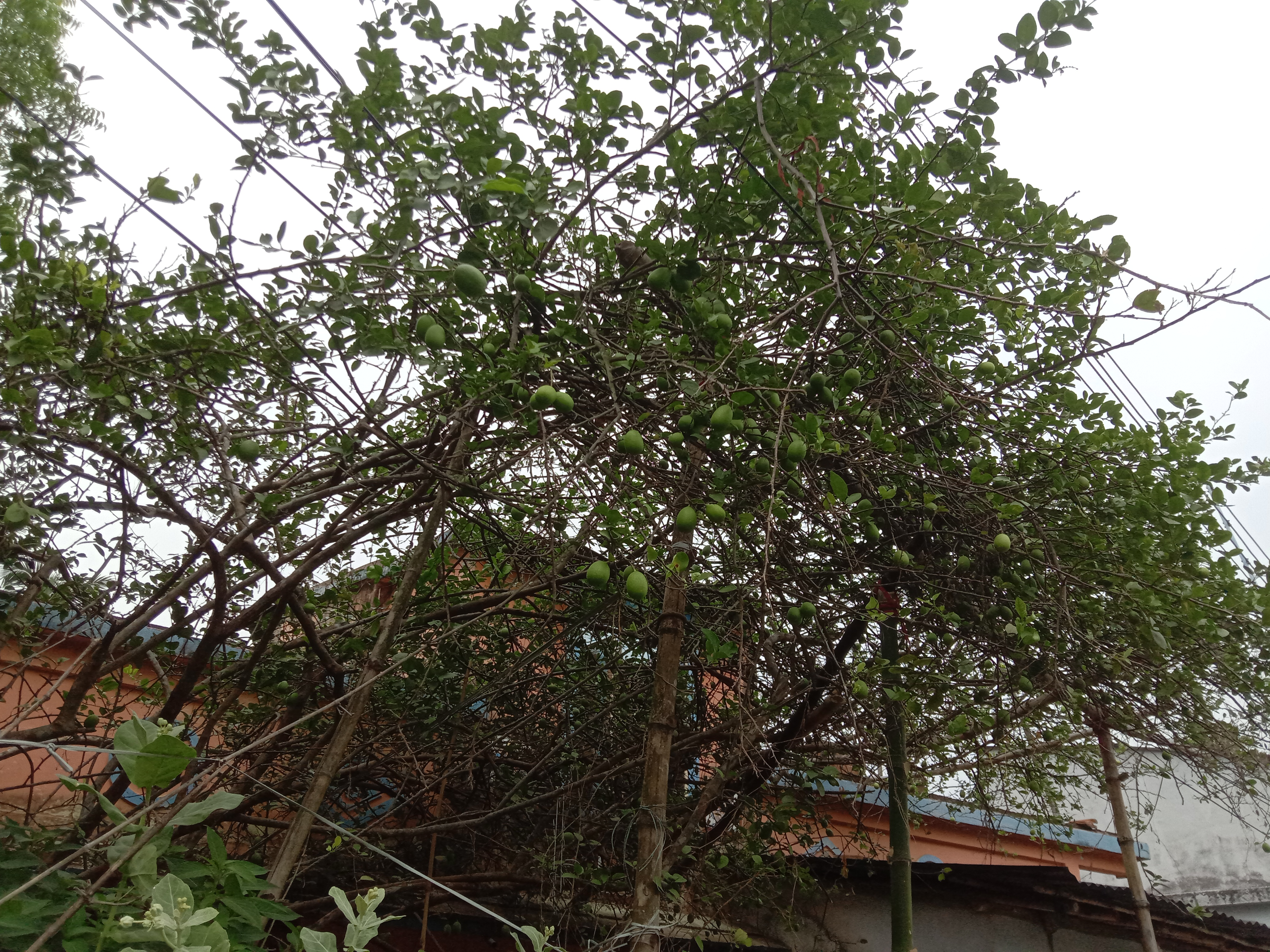
A tree full of key limes in West Bengal, India

C. aurantiifolia is a shrubby tree, growing to 5 m (16 ft), with many thorns. Dwarf varieties exist that can be grown indoors during winter months and in colder climates. Its trunk, which rarely grows straight, has many branches, and they often originate quite far down on the trunk. The leaves are ovate, 2.5–9 cm (1–3 1/2 in) long, resembling orange leaves (the scientific name aurantiifolia referring to this resemblance to the leaves of Citrus aurantium). The flowers are 2.5 cm (1 in) in diameter, are yellowish white with a light purple tinge on the margins. Flowers and fruit appear throughout the year, but are most abundant from May to September in the Northern Hemisphere.

Termed small-fruited acid lime, as opposed to large-fruited acid lime (Tahitian or Persian lime), it has a spherical fruit, 3-6 cm in diameter, sometimes with apical papillae, greenish-yellow; peel very thin, very densely glandular; segments with yellow-green pulp-vesicles, very acidic, juicy, and fragrant. Seeds are small, plump, ovoid, pale, smooth with white embryos (polyembryonic). The Key lime is usually picked while it is still green, but it becomes yellow when ripe.

Skin contact can sometimes cause phytophotodermatitis, which makes the skin especially sensitive to ultraviolet light.

== Taxonomy ==
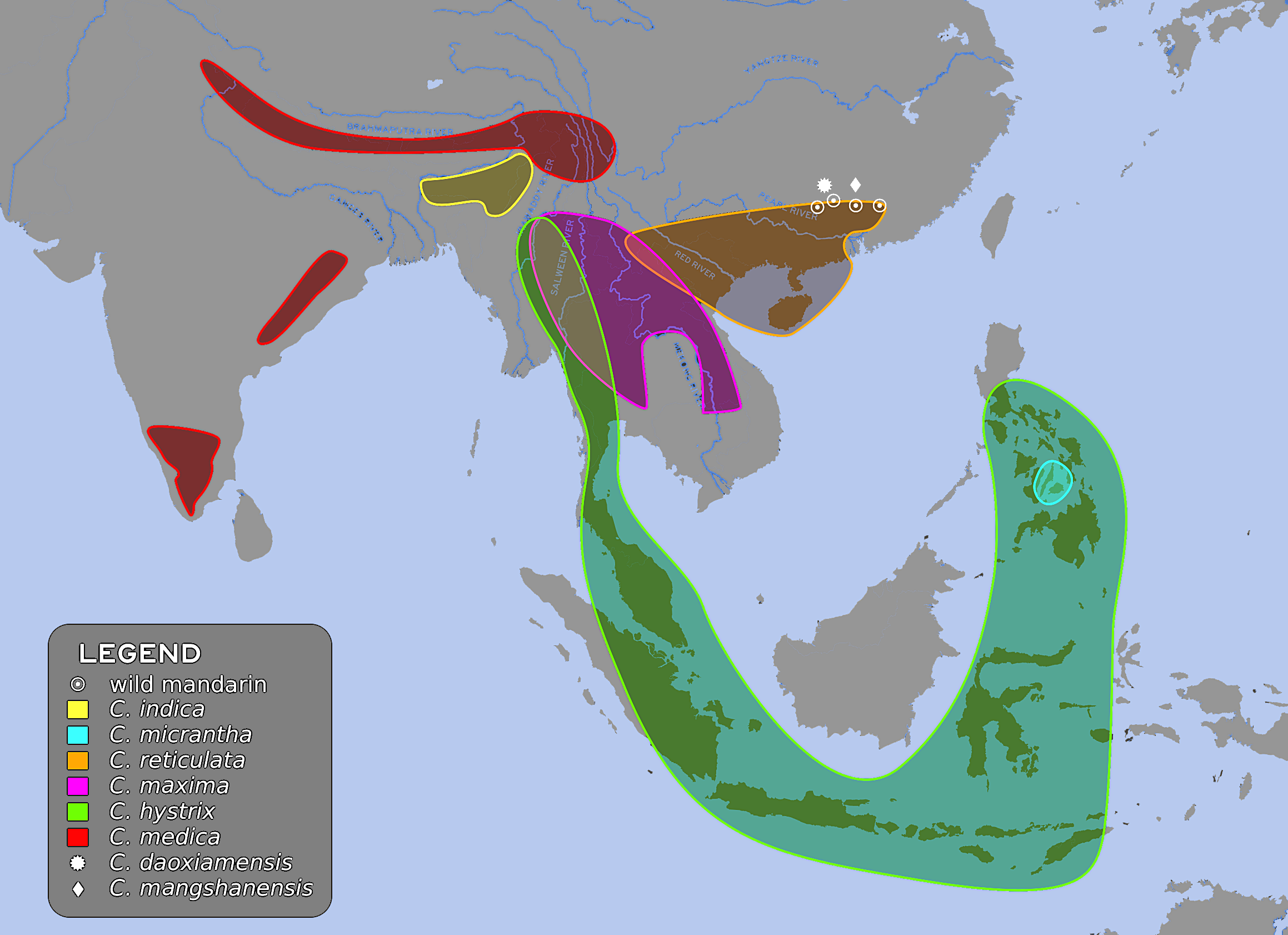
Map of inferred original wild ranges of the main Citrus cultivars, and selected relevant wild taxa

"Mexican" lime and its clonal derivatives such as "West Indian", "Kagzi" and "Key" limes are the most common cultivars of Citrus aurantifolia. Other small-fruited acid limes are cultivated in certain regions only; examples are, "Abhayapuri" lime, "Everglade" lime, "Egyptian" lime, and "India" lime.

The Key lime has given rise to several other lime varieties. The best known, the triploid progeny of a Key lime-lemon cross, is the Persian lime (Citrus × latifolia), the most widely produced lime, globally. Others are, like their parent, classed within C. aurantiifolia. Backcrossing with citron has produced a distinct group of triploid limes that are also of commercial value to a limited degree, the seedy Tanepeo, Coppenrath, Ambilobe and Mohtasseb lime varieties as well as the Madagascar lemon. Hybridization with a mandarin-pomelo cross similar to the oranges has produced the Kirk lime. The New Caledonia and Kaghzi limes appear to have resulted from an F2 Key lime self-pollination, while a spontaneous genomic duplication gave us the tetraploid Giant Key lime. The potential to produce a wider variety of lime hybrids from the Key lime due to its tendency to form diploid gametes may reduce the disease risk presented by the limited diversity of the current commercial limes.

== Distribution and habitat ==
C. aurantiifolia is native to Southeast Asia. Its apparent path of introduction was through the Middle East to North Africa, then to Sicily and Andalucia and then, via Spanish explorers, to the West Indies, including the Florida Keys. Henry Perrine is credited with introducing the Key lime to Florida. From the Caribbean, lime cultivation spread to tropical and subtropical North America, including Mexico, Florida, and later California.

== Cultivation ==
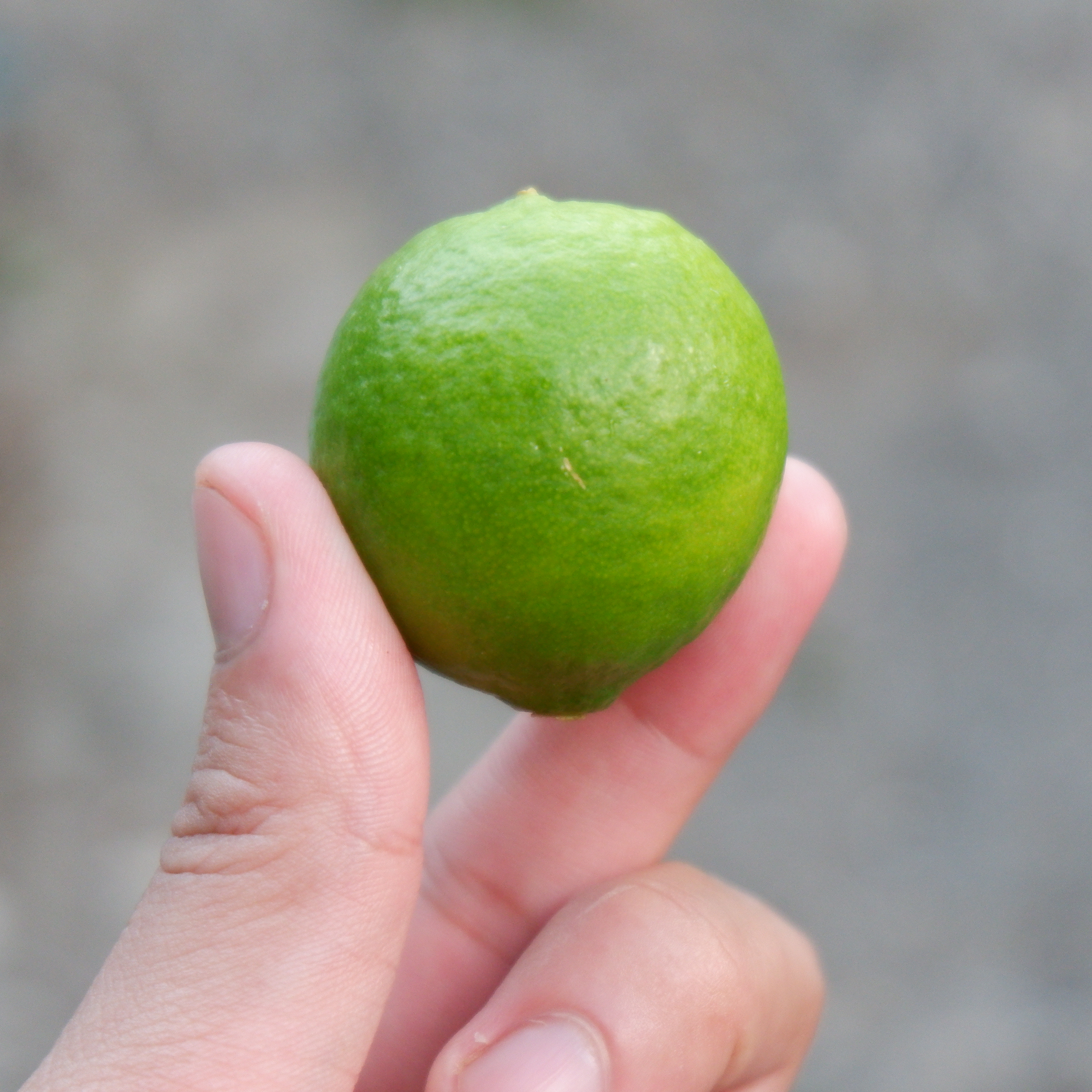
Key lime is known as dayap in the Philippines, where it is native

=== History ===
In California in the late 19th century, "Mexican" limes were more highly valued than lemons; however, in Florida, they were generally considered weeds. Then, in 1894–95, the Great Freeze destroyed the Florida lemon groves, and farmers replanted Mexican limes instead; they soon became known as the Florida Key Lime, a "beloved regional crop". But when the 1926 Miami hurricane ripped them up, they were replanted with the hardier, thornless Persian limes.

Since the North American Free Trade Agreement came into effect, most Key limes on the United States market have been grown in Mexico, Central America and South America. They are also grown in Texas, Florida, and California.

=== Propagation ===
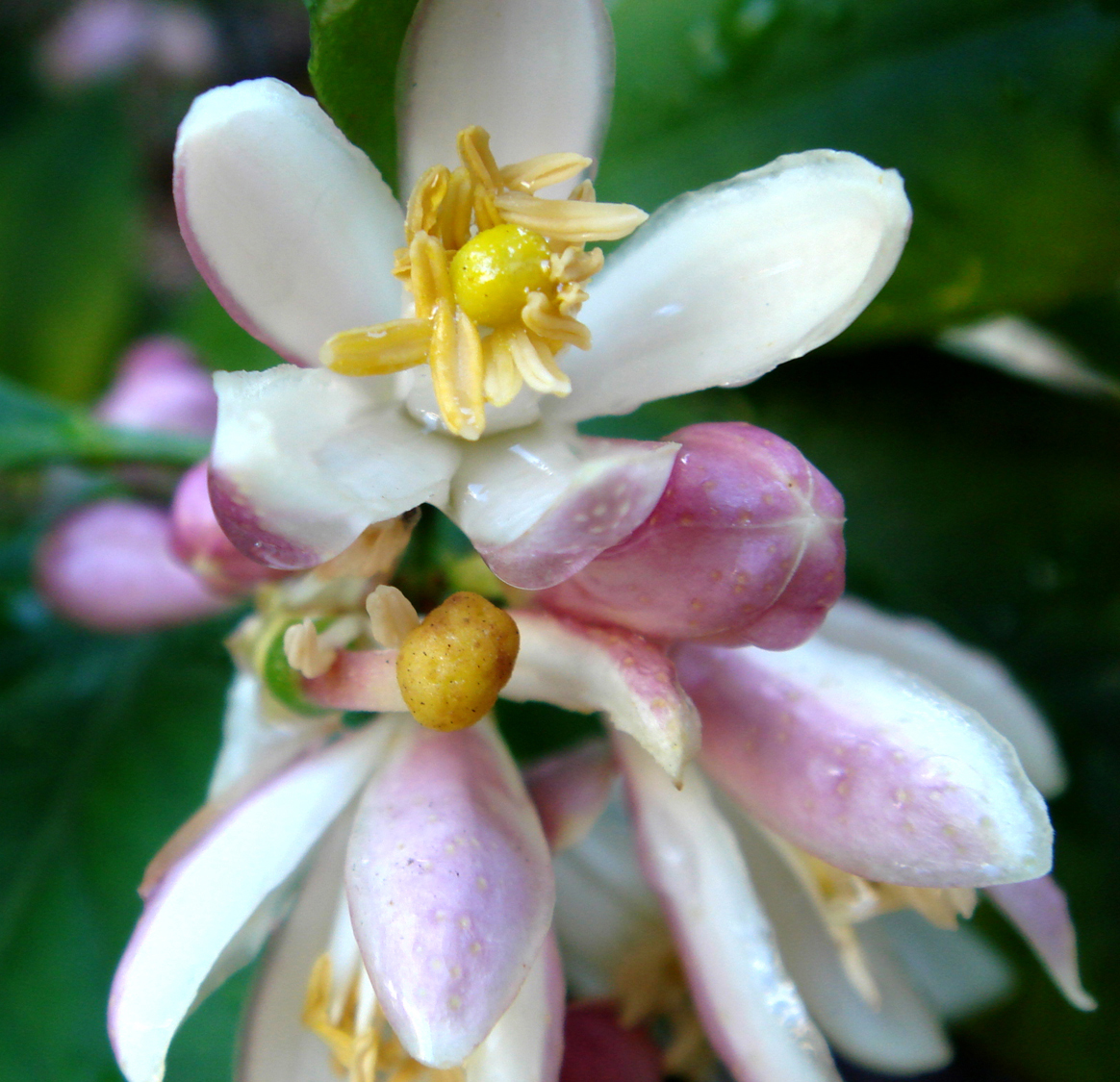
Flowers of the Key lime plant

There are various approaches to the cultivation of Key limes. This variety of citrus can be propagated from seed and will grow true to the parent. The seeds must be kept moist until they can be planted, as they will not germinate if allowed to dry out.If the plants are propagated from seed, the seeds should be stored at least 5–6 months before planting. Alternatively, vegetative propagation from cuttings or by air layering may permit fruit production within one year, and from genetically more predictable lines of plants. Another method, digging around a mature tree to sever roots, will encourage new sprouts that can be transplanted to another location. Clones are often bud grafted into rough lemon or bitter orange to obtain strong root stocks.

It is often advisable to graft the plants onto rootstocks with low susceptibility to gummosis because seedlings generally are highly vulnerable to the disease. Useful rootstocks include wild grapefruit, cleopatra mandarin and tahiti limes. C. macrophylla is also sometimes used as a rootstock in Florida to add vigor.

Climatic conditions and fruit maturation are crucial in cultivation of the lime tree. Under consistently warm conditions potted trees can be planted at any season, whereas in cooler temperate regions it is best to wait for the late winter or early spring. The Key lime tree does best in sunny sites, well-drained soils, good air circulation, and protection from cold wind. Because its root system is shallow, the Key lime is planted in trenches or into prepared and broken rocky soil to give the roots a better anchorage and improve the trees' wind resistance. Pruning and topping should be planned to maximize circulation of air and provide sufficient sunlight. This keeps the crown healthily dry, improves accessibility for harvesting, and discourages organisms that cause gummosis.

=== Harvesting ===
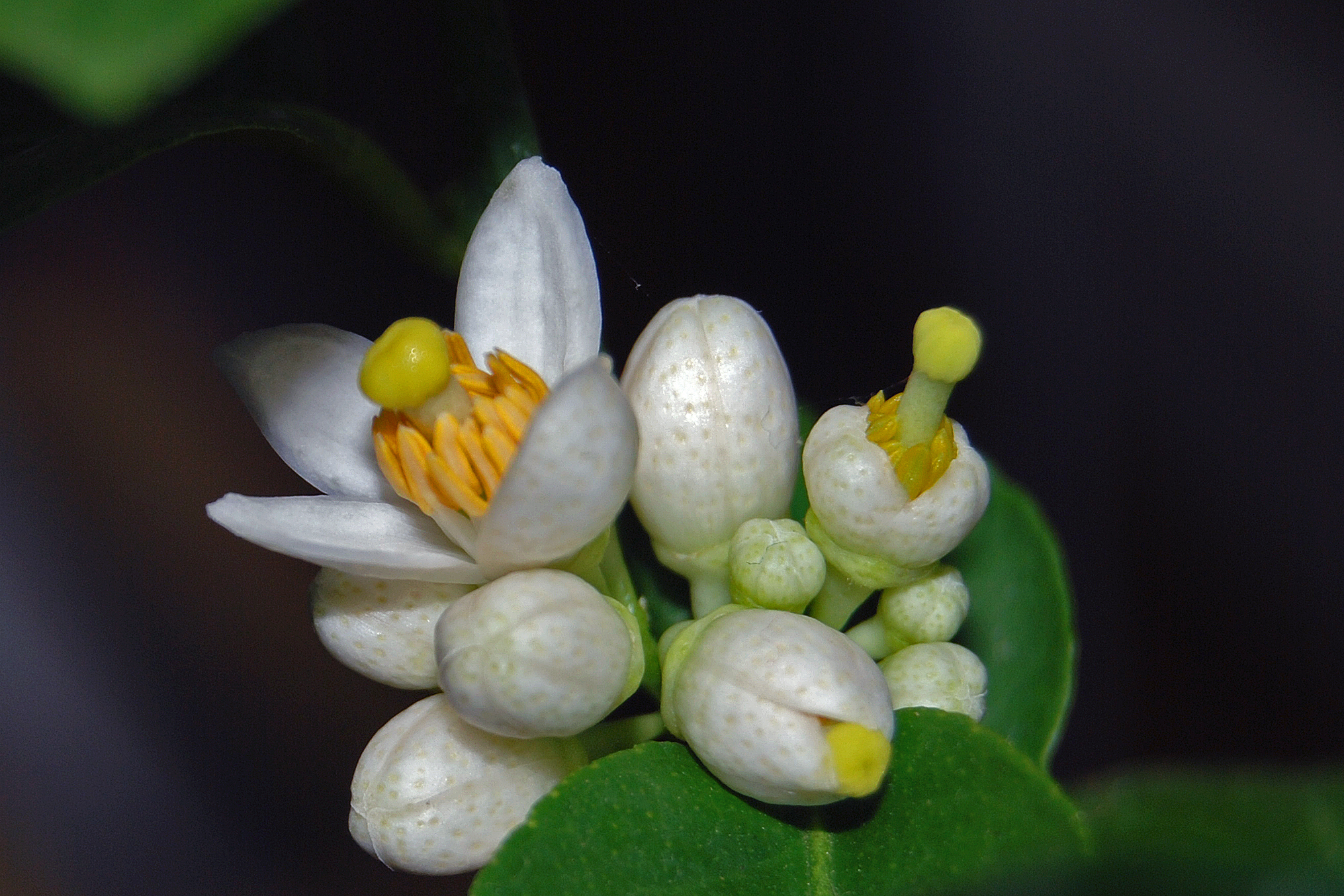
White Key lime flower in different stages

The method of cultivation greatly affects the size and quality of the harvest. Trees cultivated from seedlings take 4–8 years before producing a harvest. They attain their maximal yield at about 10 years of age. Trees produced from cuttings and air layering bear fruit much sooner, sometimes producing fruit (though not a serious harvest) a year after planting. It takes approximately 9 months from the blossom to the fruit. When the fruit have grown to harvesting size and begin to turn yellow they are picked and not clipped. To achieve produce of the highest market value, it is important not to pick the fruit too early in the morning; the turgor is high then, and handling turgid fruit releases the peel oils and may cause spoilage.

=== Postharvest process ===
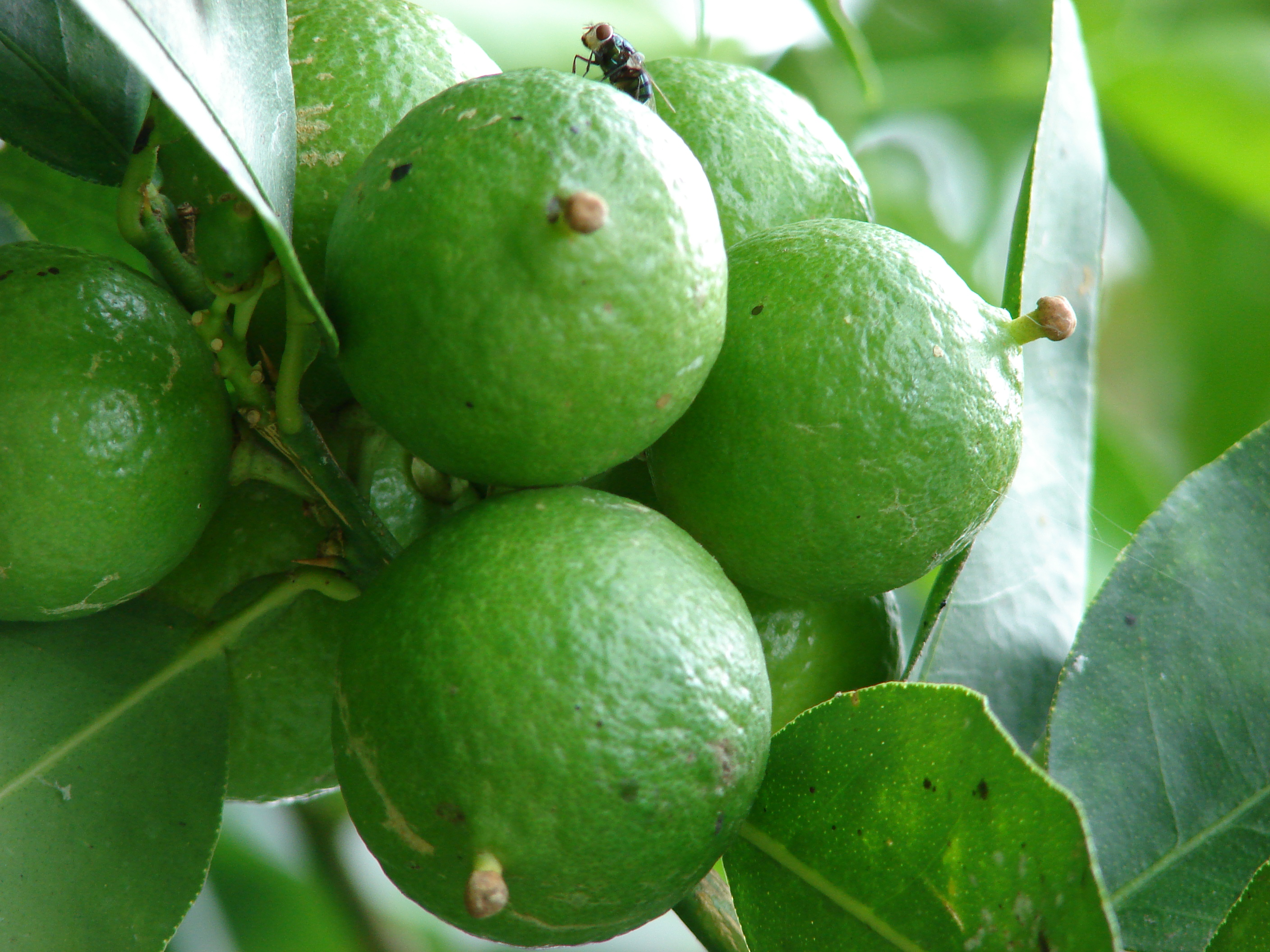
Key lime fruits with persistent styles

Shelf life of Key limes is an important consideration in marketing. The lime still ripens for a considerable time after harvesting, and it is usually stored between 12.5 and 15.5 °C (55–60 °F) at a relative humidity of 75–85%. Special procedures are employed to control the shelf life; for example, applications of growth regulators, fruit wax, fungicides, precise cooling, calcium compounds, silver nitrate, and special packing material. The preferred storage conditions are temperatures of 9–10 °C (48–50 °F) and a humidity over 85%, but even in ideal conditions post-harvesting losses are high.

In India most Key lime producers are small-scale farmers without access to such post-harvesting facilities, but makeshift expedients can be of value. One successful procedure is a coating of coconut oil that improves shelf life, thereby achieving a constant market supply of Key limes.

Key limes are made into black lime by boiling them in brine and drying them. Black lime is a condiment commonly used in the Middle East.

=== Yield ===
The yield varies depending on the age of the trees. Five- to seven-year-old orchards may yield about 6 t/ha (2.7 tons/acre), with harvests increasing progressively until they stabilize at about 12–18 t/ha (5.4–8 tons/acre). Seedling trees take longer to attain their maximal harvest, but eventually out-yield grafted trees.

== In culture ==
The annual Key Lime Festival in Key West, Florida, has been held every year since 2002 over the Independence Day weekend and is a celebration of Key limes in food, drinks, and culture, with a significant emphasis on Key lime pie.
