= Flag of Saskatoon =

Canadian city flag

The flag of Saskatoon is the banner representing the city of Saskatoon and consists of a branch of Saskatoon berries on a green background on the left, with seven yellow stripes, white alternating, on the right. The Saskatoon coat of arms is imposed on the stripes.

The idea of a flag was proposed by the committee handling the 70th anniversary celebrations of Saskatoon. Deck Whitehead's design ended up being selected but after the celebrations, was forgotten. In 1966, fourteen years later, Saskatoon were looking for a flag to celebrate its 60th birthday. A citizen reminded the then mayor of Whitehead's design with a letter.

== Design ==
The design is based on the city colours and the thirteen stripes based on the flag of the United States. The seven yellow stripes represent each district: North Park, City Park, Mayfair, Caswell Hill, Pleasant Hill, Nutana and City Centre. The Saskatoon berry is one of the symbols of the city of Saskatoon and how the city got its name.

The coat of arms is divided in two parts: the lower being gold and the upper green. The green represents the growing crops and the gold evokes the harvest. The open book is taken from the coat of arms of the University of Saskatchewan and represents the connection between the academic seats and Saskatoon. The cogged silver wheel with wheat symbolizes the industry primarily agricultural. The eight lines coming from a hub evokes the importance of Saskatoon as a railway and distributing place. The bezant encircled by the hub indicates the importance commercially of Saskatoon.

== History ==
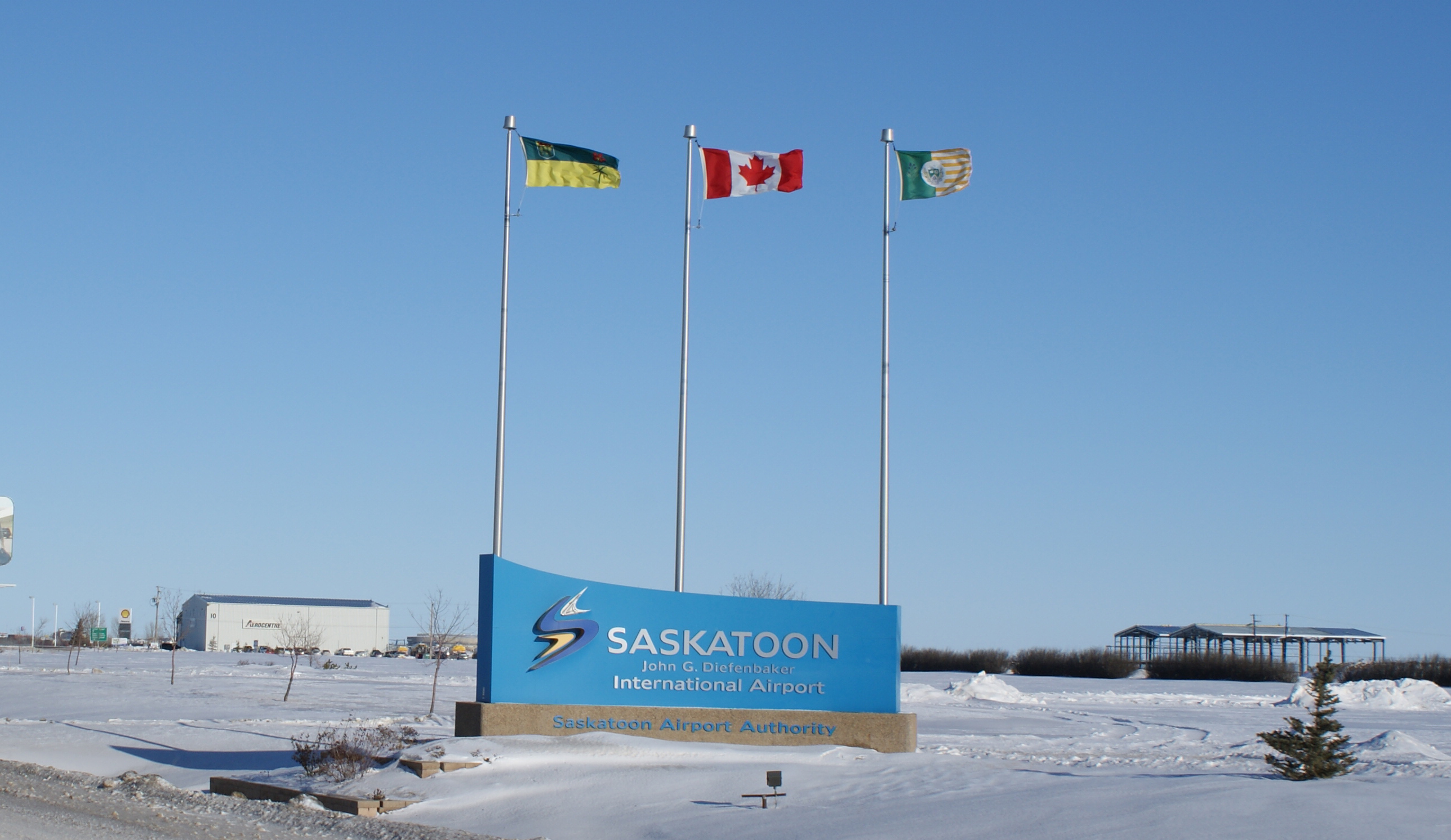
A flag of Saskatoon at the John G. Diefenbaker International Airport in Saskatoon with the flag of Canada and Saskatchewan.

The idea of a flag was proposed by the committee handling the 70th anniversary celebrations of Saskatoon. Two designs were submitted, both containing the yellow and green present in the city's coat of arms and a Saskatoon berry motif in purple. The staff side of each were about a quarter of the total length, and were of a solid green. The remaining portion of one was solid yellow whilst the other one was of a yellow and white stripes. The coat of arms of both were a junction of the green-yellow blocks. The Saskatoon berry was superimposed on a yellow background and on the other the berries are on a green background. The latter (Deck Whitehead's design) ended up being selected. After the celebrations in 1952 however, it was forgotten and filed away.

Fourteen years later, in 1966, Saskatoon were looking for a banner to celebrate the 60th anniversary of the city's incorporation. A citizen reminded, by the writing of a letter, Whitehead's design to the then-mayor of Saskatoon Ernest Cole. The city took the design and used it to create the city flag, which was first raised at City Hall in 1966 to open the Saskatoon tourist season. The flag nor the coat of arms were registered and no record for why such decision was chosen has been recorded.
