= Saskatoon berry pie =

Pie with a saskatoon berry filling

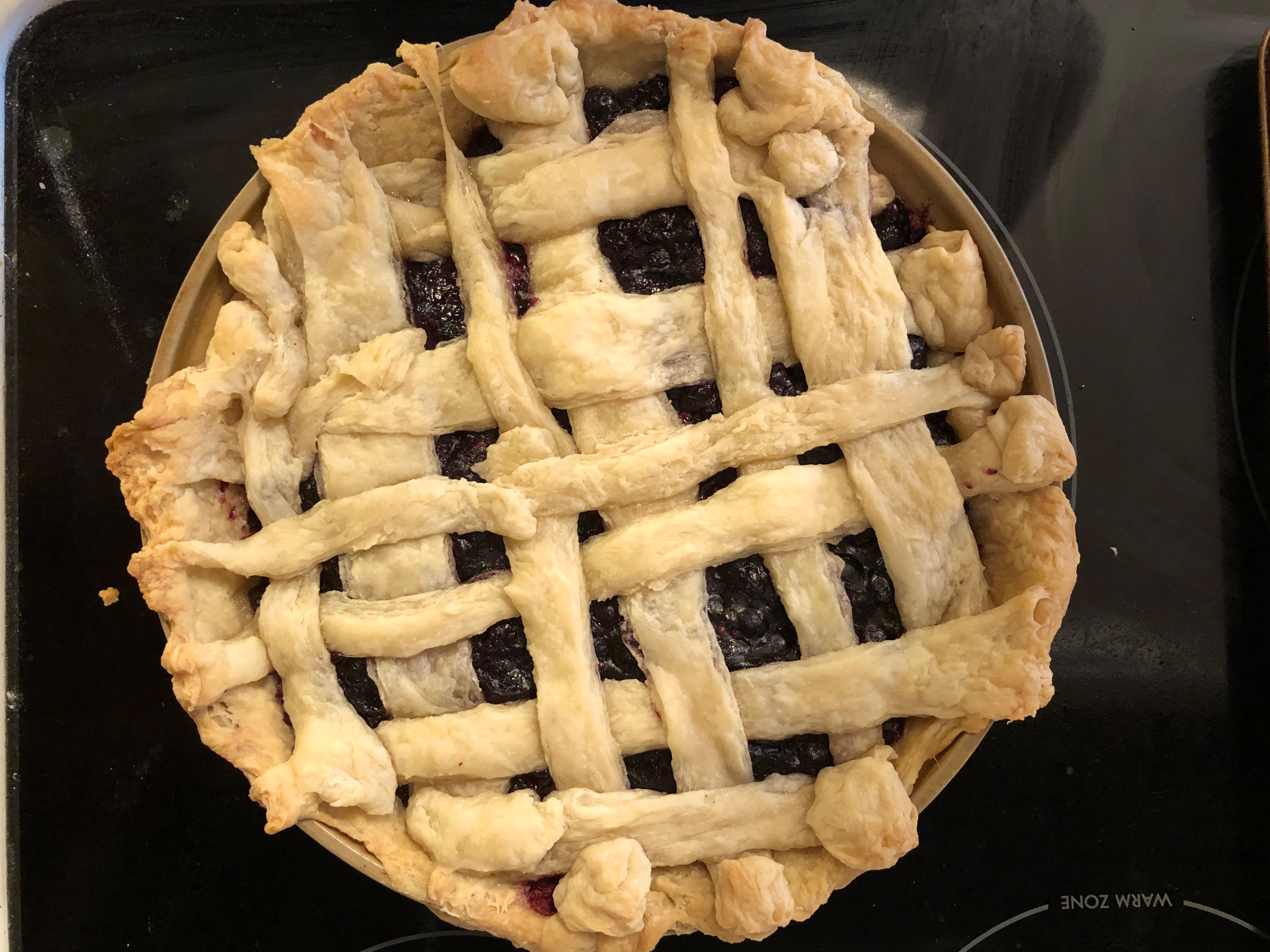
- Alternative names: Saskatoon pie; Juneberry pie; Serviceberry pie
- Type: Fruit pie
- Course: Dessert
- Place of origin: Canada
- Region or state: Saskatchewan, Canadian Prairies
- Main ingredients: Saskatoon berries, flour, lemon juice, sugar

Saskatoon berry pie (also known as saskatoon pie, juneberry pie, or serviceberry pie) is a fruit pie with saskatoon berry filling. The pie is a traditional Canadian dessert, particularly in Saskatchewan. Saskatoon berry pie is often served with whipped cream, ice cream, or slices of cheddar cheese.

== Ingredients ==
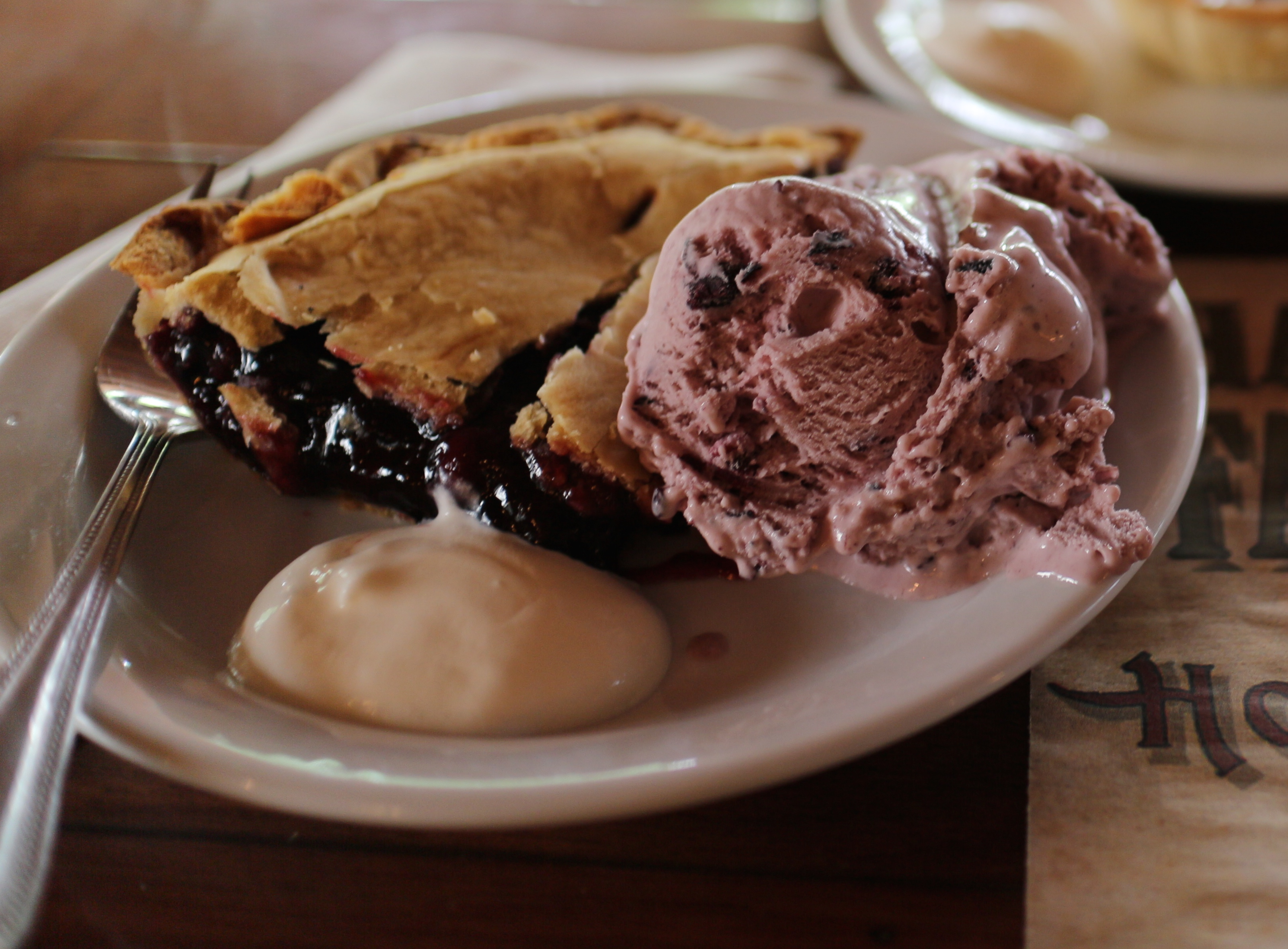
Saskatoon berry pie with ice cream

Saskatoon berry pie typically contains saskatoon berries, flour, sugar, and lemon juice. Cinnamon or nutmeg may be added.

The pie originated in the Prairies region of Canada. Often served with vanilla ice cream as a dessert, the pie is sometimes made with blueberries as a saskatoon berry substitute.

== In Canadian culture ==
In 2019, Canada Post released a stamp series called Sweet Canada, which included a stamp of saskatoon berry pie. The stamps were of five traditional Canadian desserts, with the saskatoon berry pie stamp representing the Prairies.

Musician Fred Penner has a song titled "Saskatoon Berry Pie."

Saskatoon Pie! is a musical comedy written by Geoffrey Ursell that won Persephone Theatre's national playwriting competition in 1981.

== See also ==
- Bumbleberry pie
- Flipper pie
- Nanaimo bar, another dessert that has a stamp in the Sweet Canada series
- List of pies, tarts and flans
