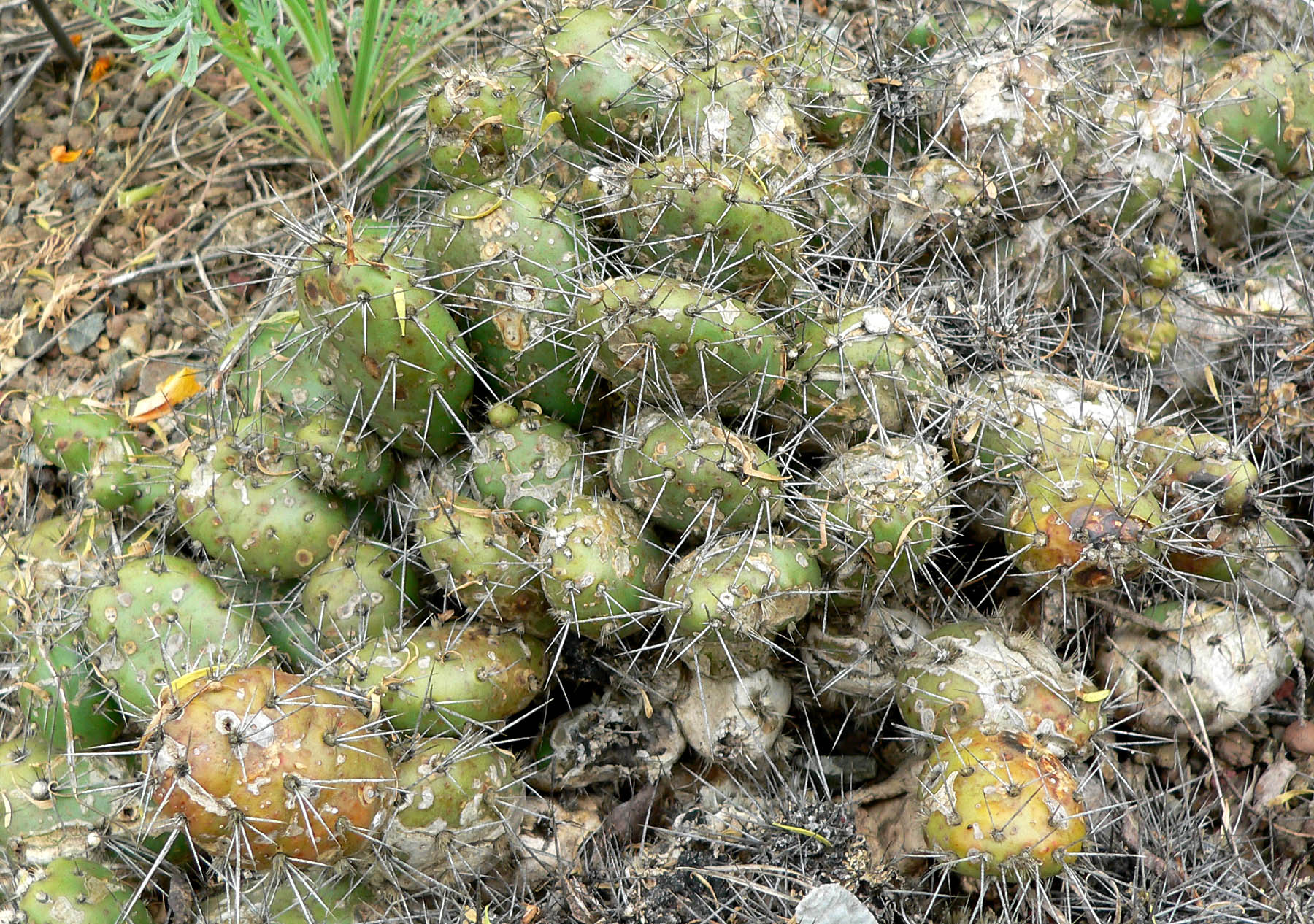

Conservation status
- Least Concern (IUCN 3.1)

- Secure (NatureServe)

Scientific classification
- Kingdom: Plantae
- Clade: Tracheophytes
- Clade: Angiosperms
- Clade: Eudicots
- Order: Caryophyllales
- Family: Cactaceae
- Genus: Opuntia
- Species: O. fragilis

Binomial name
- Opuntia fragilis (Nutt.) Haw.

Synonyms
- Cactus fragilis Opuntia brachyarthra

= Opuntia fragilis =

Species of cactus

Opuntia fragilis, known by the common names brittle pricklypear and little prickly pear, is a prickly pear cactus native to much of western North America.

== Description ==
Opuntia fragilis is a small, prostrate plant, up to 20 centimetres (8 in) tall. The joints are tumid, fragile, easily detached, oval, elliptical, or subglobose, 3–5 cm (1–2 in) long and nearly as thick as broad, bright green. The areoles are 0.6–1.3 cm (1/4–1/2 in) apart, with whitish wool and a few white to yellow bristles, which are much longer and more abundant on older joints. There are 2–7 spines up to 1–6.5 cm (1/2–2 1/2 in) long and 1–3 very short ones; they are dark brown and weak, the upper spine usually longer and stronger than the others.

The flowers are greenish yellow, 2.5–3.2 cm (1–1 1/4 in) wide. The fruit is ovate to subglobose with few spines or bristles, mostly sterile, up to 2.5 cm (1 in) long, with many seeds.

== Subspecies and varieties ==
- Var. brachyarthra, Coult. A plant with more swollen joints, more numerous and stronger spines, smaller flowers and more spiny fruit. Colorado, New Mexico.
- Var. caespitosa, Hort. Joints bright green, smaller and more crowded than in the type: flowers bright yellow. Colorado.
- Var. fragilis
- Var. tuberiformis, Hort. Joints olive-green, bulbous-looking. Colorado.

== Distribution and habitat ==
It is native to every US state west of North Dakota and Texas as well as some midwestern states such as Minnesota, Illinois, Iowa, Wisconsin, and Michigan. However, it is often only present in one area of a state, for example only in Siskiyou County, California at the northern edge of the state. It also occurs in every Canadian province from Ontario to the Pacific Coast. It is known to grow farther north than any other cactus, occurring at as far north as the watershed of the Peace River, ~56°N latitude in British Columbia. There is an isolated and possibly genetically unique population in Eastern Ontario known as the "Kaladar population".

Opuntia fragilis near the shores of the Peace River

It grows on outcrops, dry grassy knolls, and in sandy soil, along with sagebrush and junipers.

== Culture ==
The Syilx/Okanagan use the blooming of O. fragilis as an indicator that saskatoon berries are ripening.

== Gallery ==
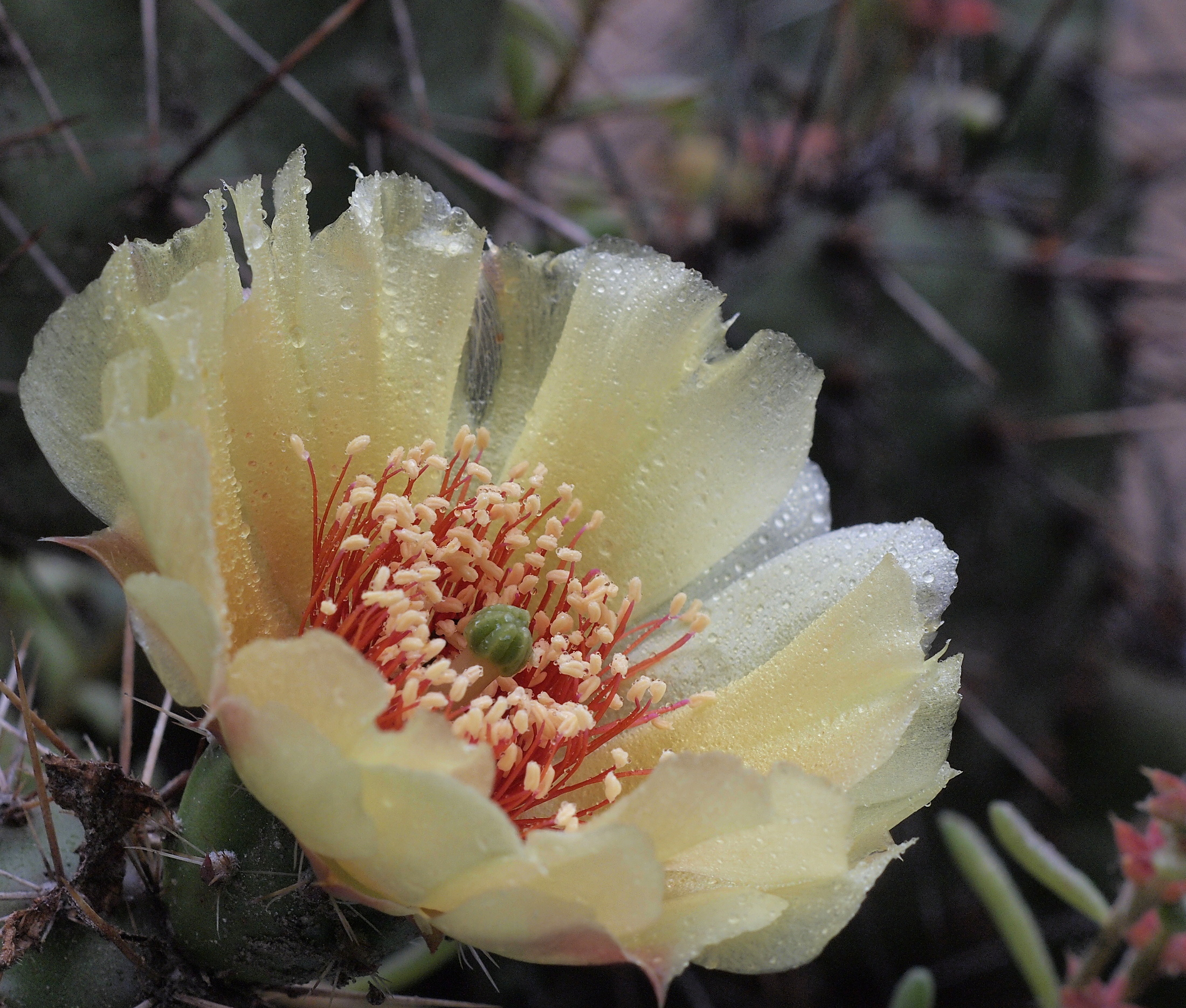

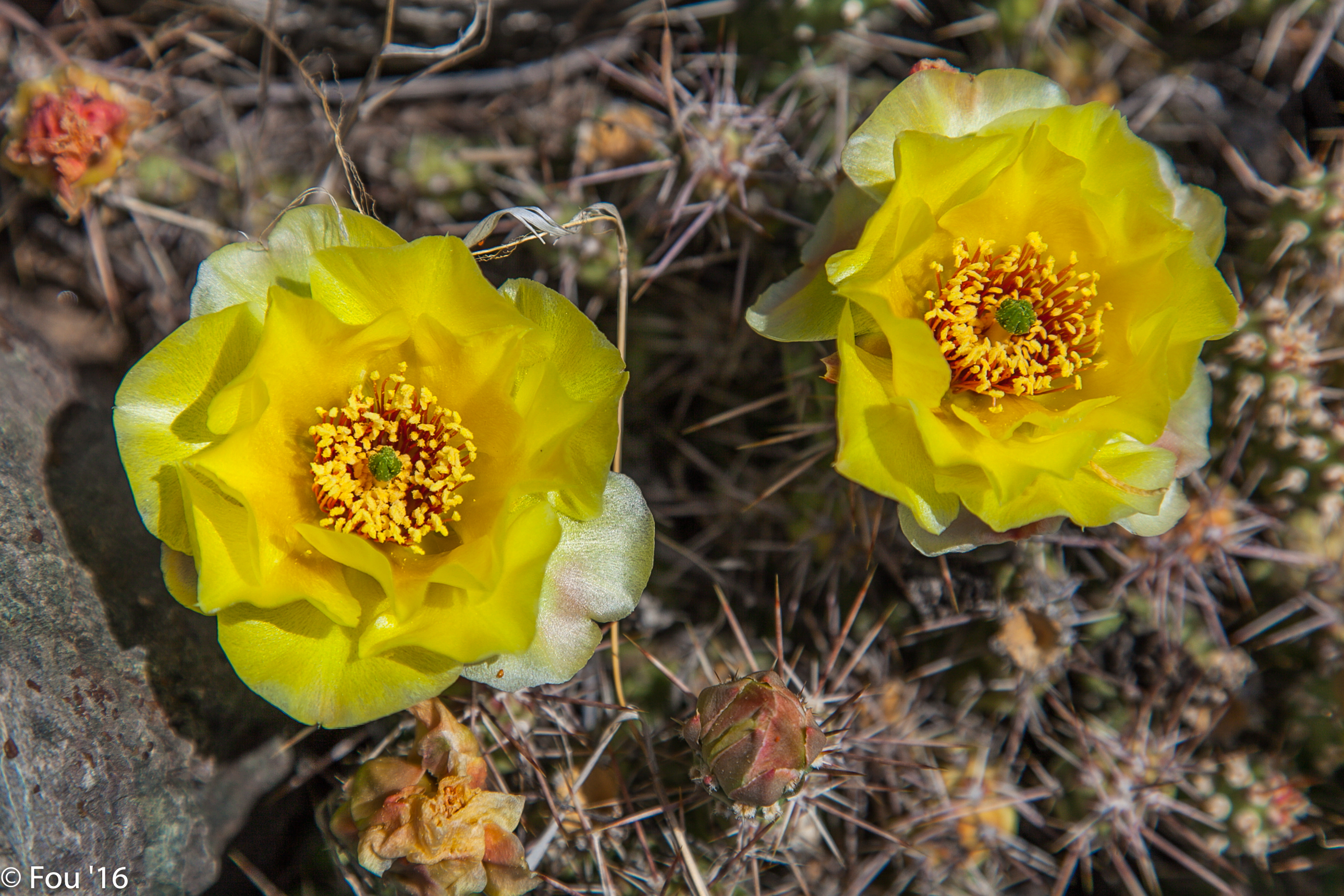

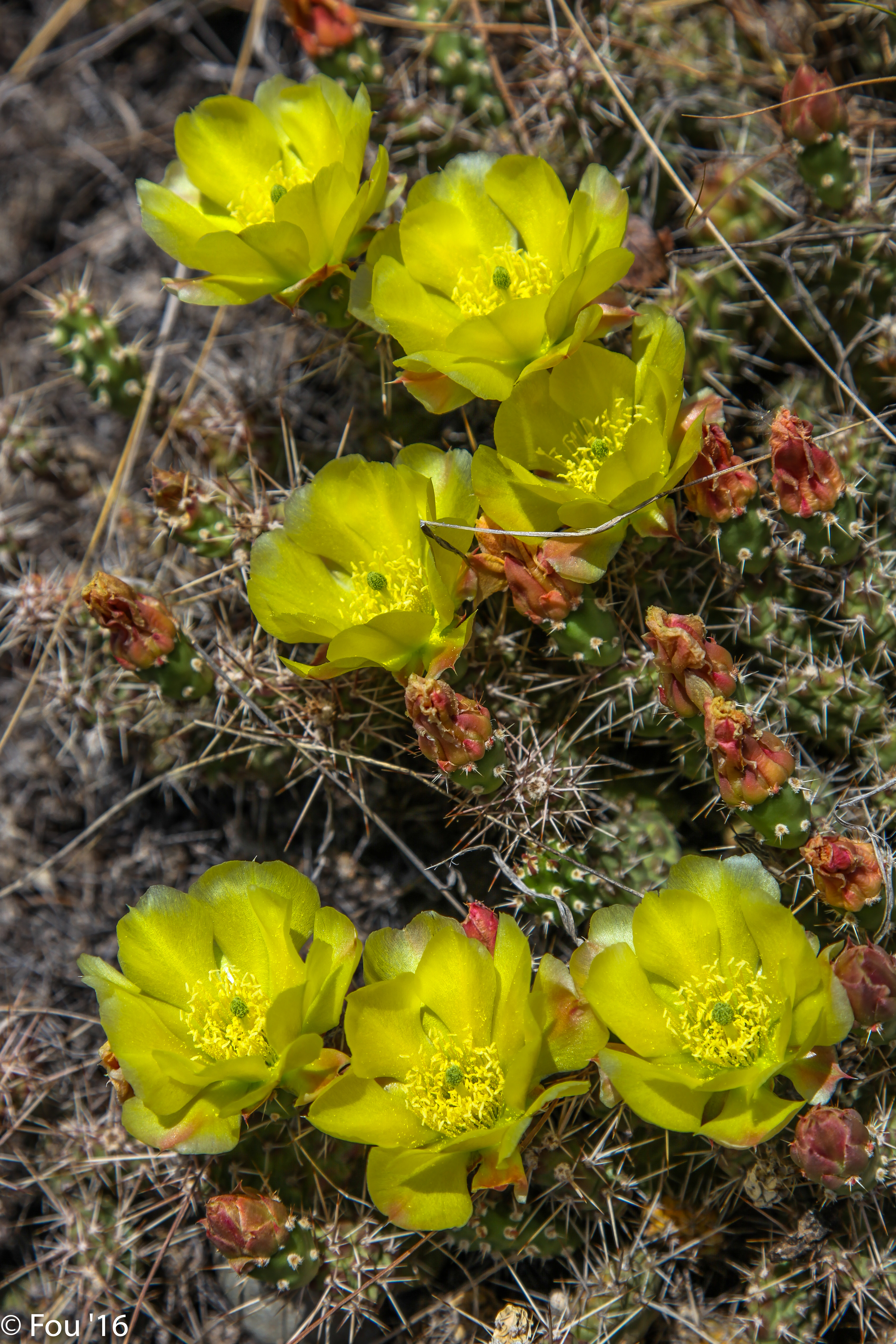

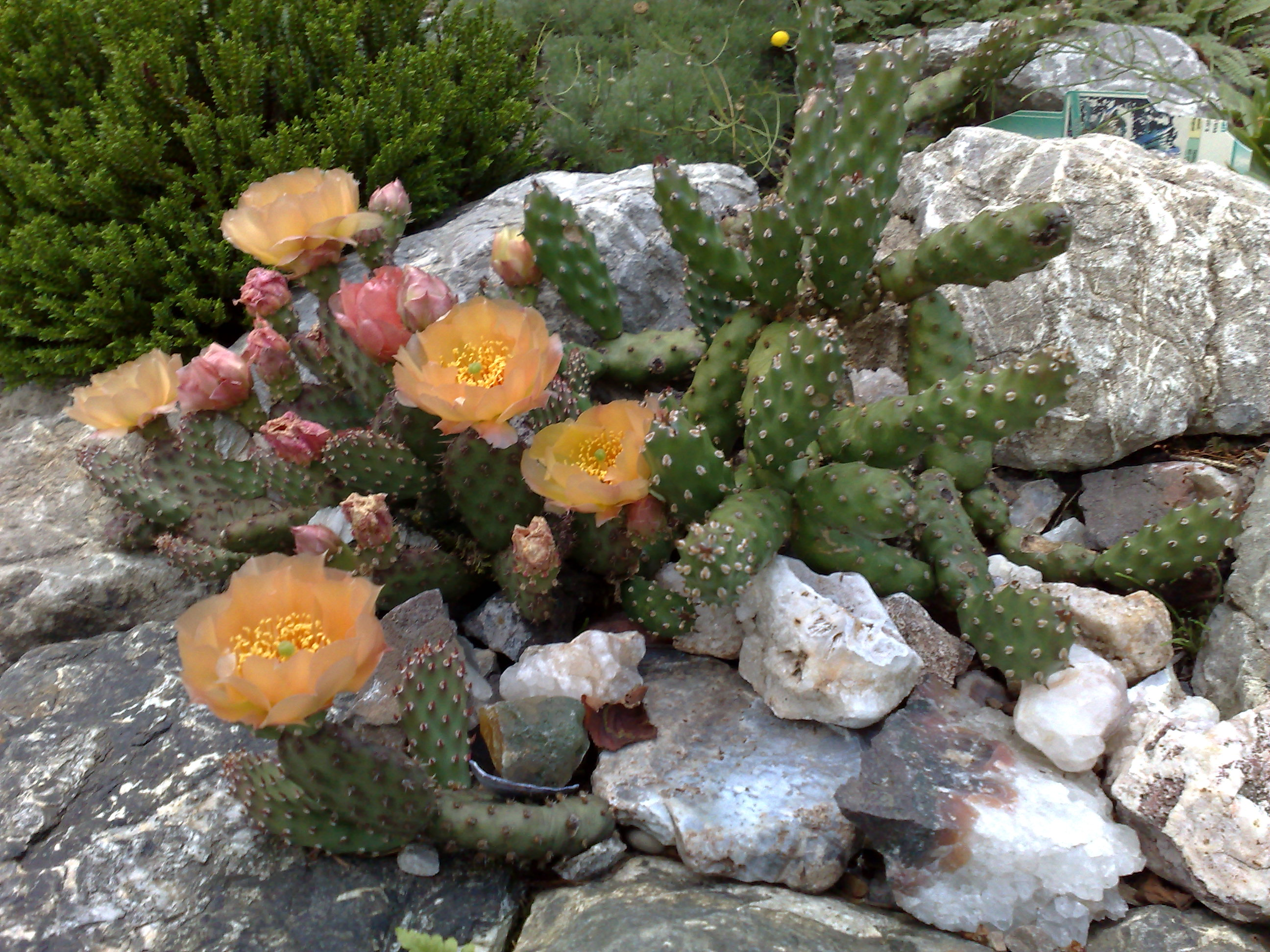
Opuntia fragilis var. denudata

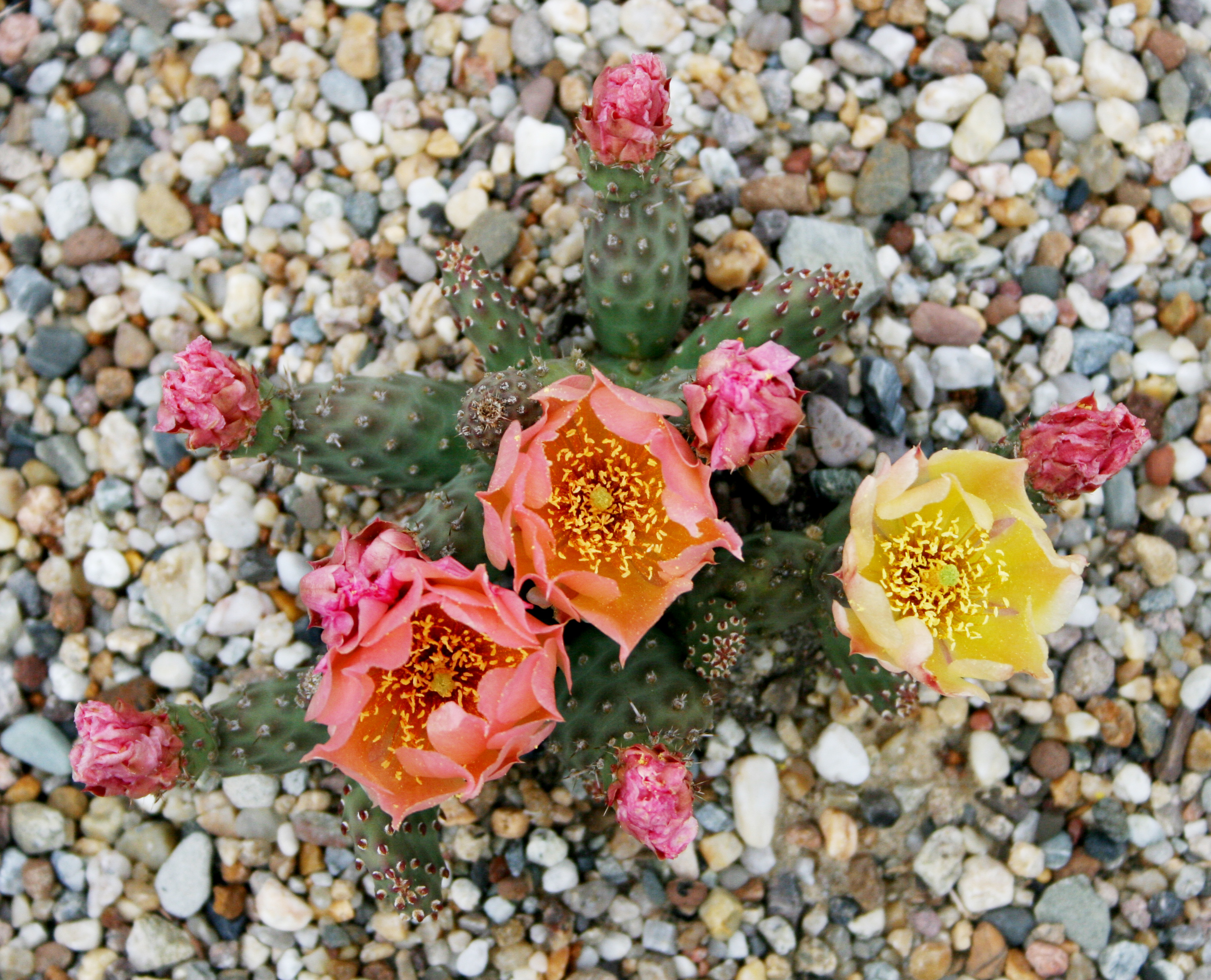
Opuntia fragilis var. denudata

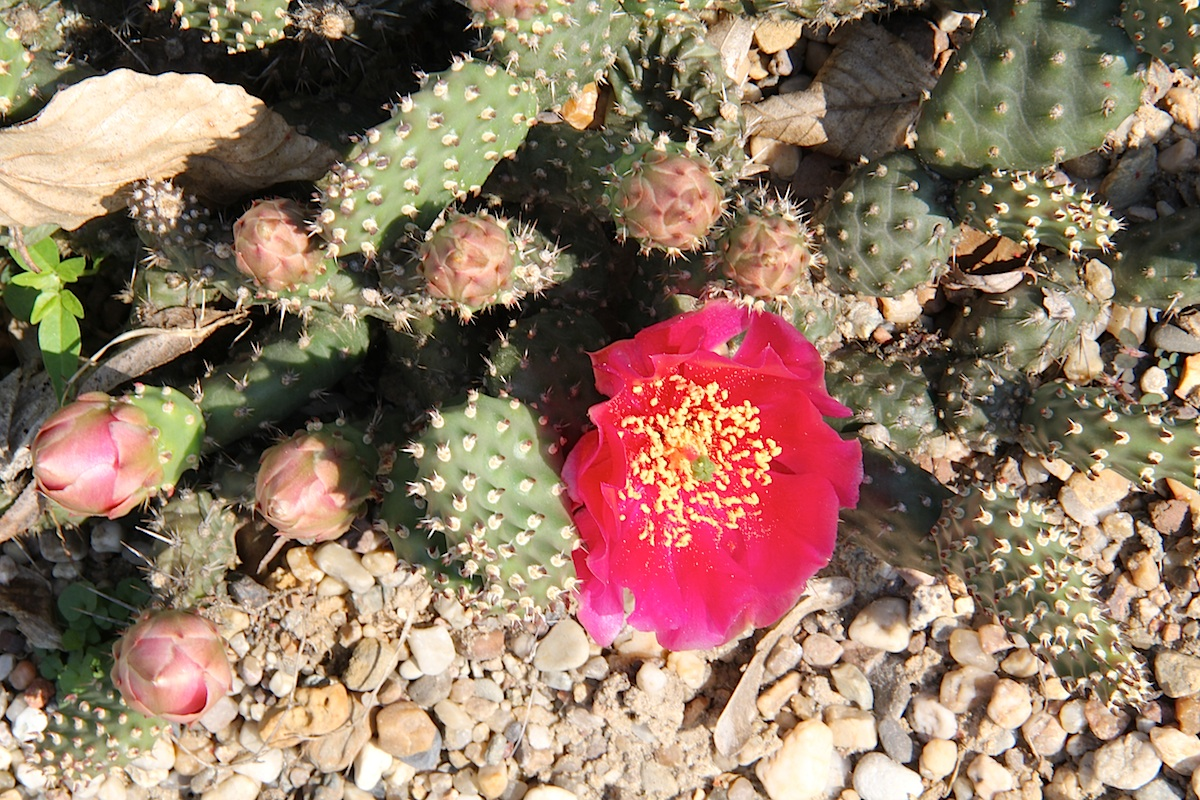
A hybrid
