= Raspberry pie =

Pie with a raspberry filling

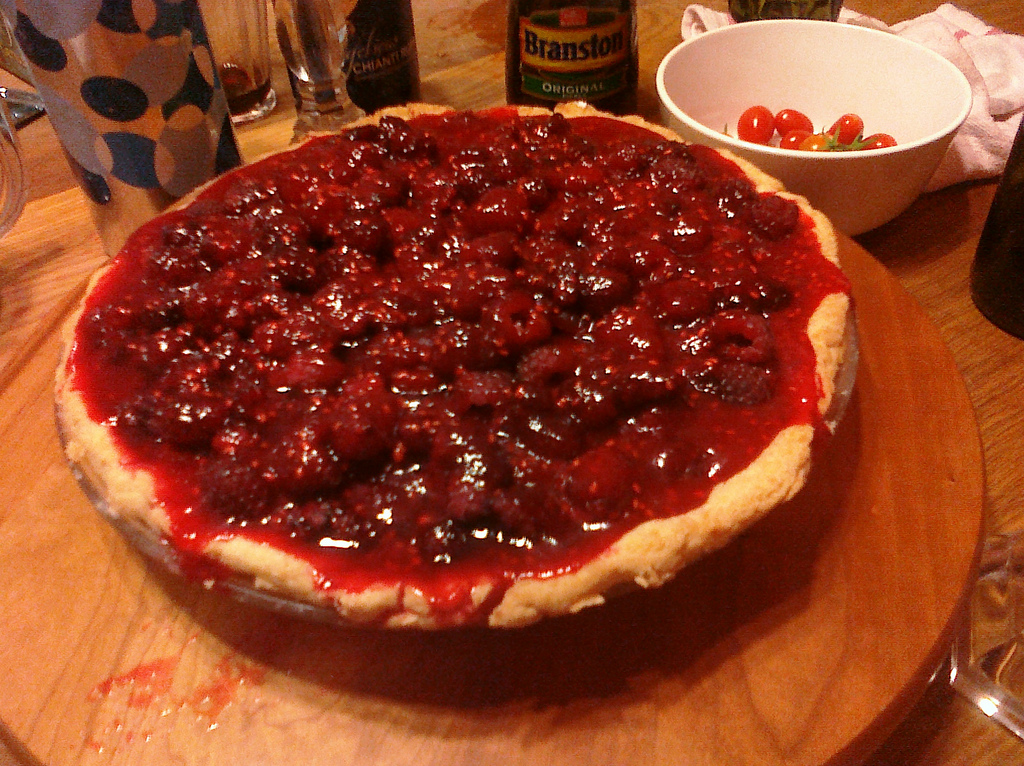
- Type: Pie
- Course: Dessert
- Main ingredients: Raspberries

Raspberry pie is a type of fruit pie with a raspberry filling. The primary ingredients include raspberries, sugar, lemon juice, salt, and butter. A common variant of raspberry pie is raspberry cream pies, which are raspberry pies with cream added. Raspberry pie is eaten around the world, and the specific region of origin of raspberry pie is unknown.

National Raspberry Cream Pie Day is a holiday that takes place every year on August 1 in the United States in celebration of raspberry cream pies. During this holiday, people often bake raspberry pies.

== See also ==
- List of pies, tarts and flans
