= Fruit pie =

Pie with fruit filling

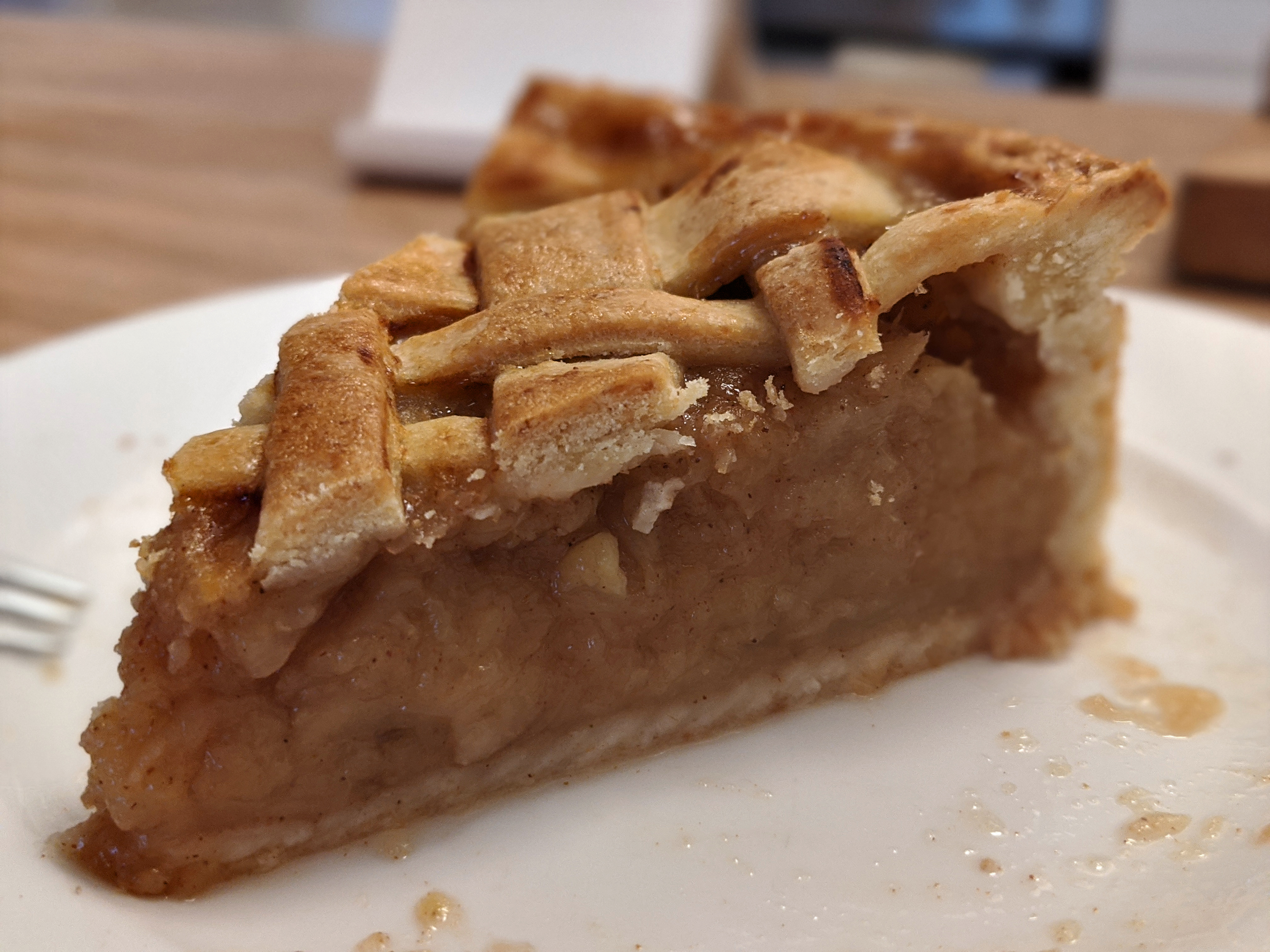
A slice of apple pie

A fruit pie has a filling of cooked or uncooked fruit, and may be covered or uncovered.

== Preparation ==
In a fruit pie, fruits may be cooked or uncooked. One preparation of an uncooked fruit pie may involve tossing fruit in a hot syrup to produce a glaze, before putting it in a pie crust and letting it chill. By adding a sugar coating, the fruit preserves its shape for longer. Many cooks making fruit pies with cooked fillings also contend with the objective of maintaining the shape of the fruit. As fruit is heated, cell walls break down and release water. By adding sugar during cooking, this process is slowed; working around this, a cook may delay adding sugar until they have cooked the fruit to their desired texture.

Adding sugar, however, does not deal with the release of water. Water released from fruit can dilute the filling, and, as a pie is baked, it can boil up and out of the container and crust, leaving a sticky residue in the oven. To avoid this, Monroe Boston Strause recommends coating sliced fruit with sugar and placing it in a colander over a sink for a few hours. There, fruit juices drain into a container, which are thickened and repeatedly boiled to create a glaze that he pours over the fruit before baking. (Note: This technique does not cause fruits like blueberries with thick skins to release water.)

=== Industrial ===
Fruit pie is made industrially by manufacturers such as Sara Lee in plants which can produce tens of thousands of pies a day. The amount of filling they add to each pie depends on factors such as the type of fruit (those containing intensely flavored fruits such as cherries will have less fruit added than pies made with fruits like blueberry or apple), and the target market (pies marketed as a "premium" product will often have more filling added). To maintain the same filling consistency across fruit pies, industrial producers often add waxy starches, which form a soft, thick gel or paste, thickening the interior. These are chosen over other starches due to their clear appearance and slow rate of crystallization.

== Comparison with tarts ==
In British English, fruit pies are enclosed, distinct from fruit tarts which have an open face. This distinction is not observed in American English, where tarts are generally a small pastry with a sweet filling and with an open top.

== History ==
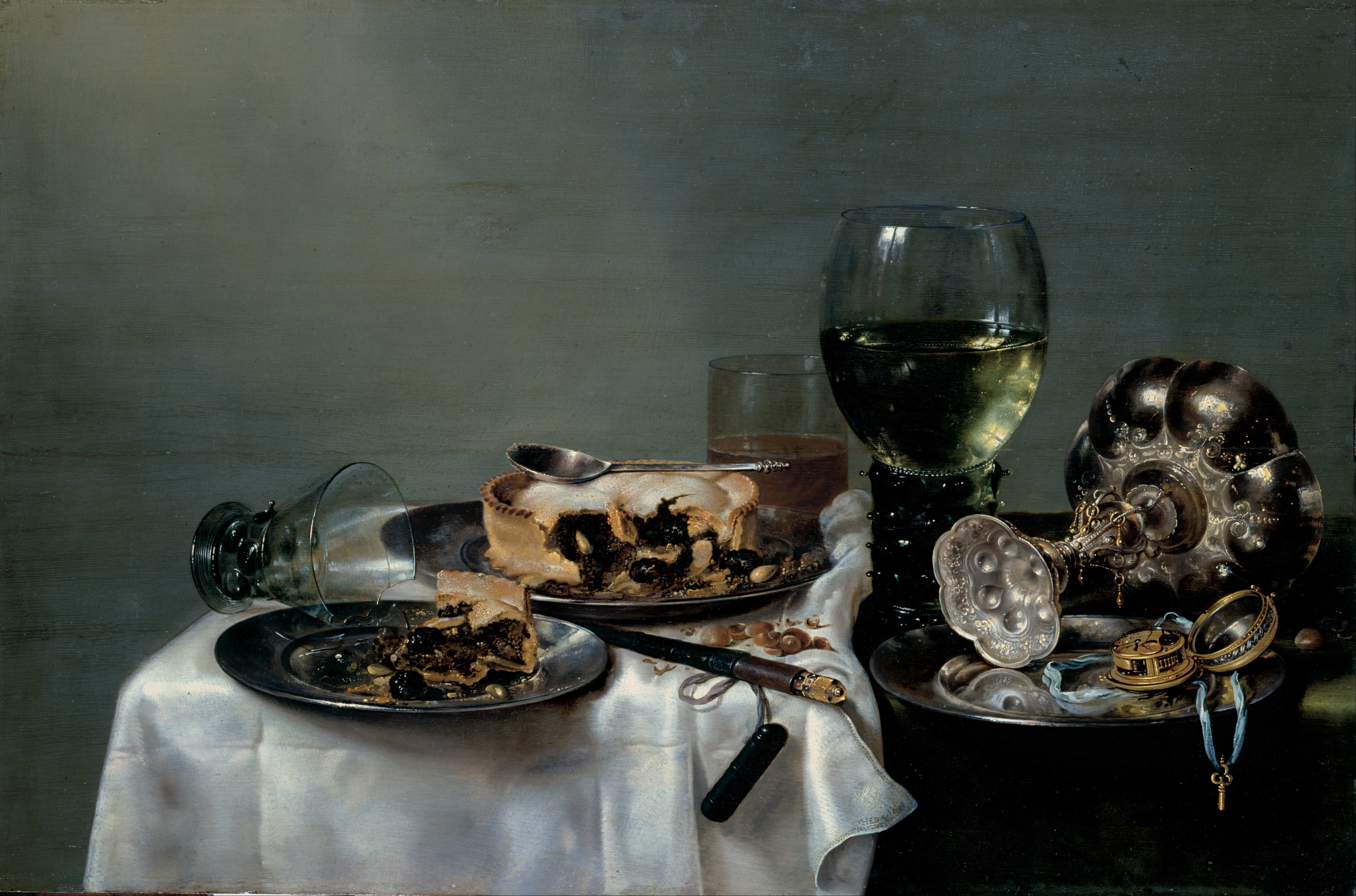
Willem Claesz. Heda's Breakfast Table with Blackberry Pie (1631)

Fruit pies evolved from earlier meat and fish pies in the 16th century. In France in this period, they appeared at the end of the meal, containing fruits such as apple. Recipes for fruit pies appeared in American Cookery, the first cookbook published by an American author. Therein, the book's author Amelia Simmons recommends cooks avoid adding spices, and suggests fillings such as plums, currants, blackberries, and apples; the last being covered in two recipes. Recommendations for sugar quantities were imprecise, sometimes expressed as ratios, at other times omitted altogether.

== List ==
- Apple pie
- Blackberry pie
- Blueberry pie
- Bumbleberry pie
- Cherry pie
- Dried apple pie
- Grape pie
- Key lime pie
- Raspberry pie
- Rhubarb pie
- Saskatoon berry pie
- Shaker lemon pie
- Strawberry pie

== See also ==
- List of pies, tarts and flans
- Pie in American cuisine

== Sources ==
- Ayto, John (2002). An A to Z of Food and Drink. Oxford, Oxfordshire: Oxford University Press. ISBN 0-19-280352-2.
- Corriher, Shirley (2008). BakeWise: The Hows and Whys of Successful Baking with Over 200 Magnificent Recipes. Simon and Schuster. pp. 409–415. ISBN 978-1-4165-6078-4.
- Stavely, Keith; Fitzgerald, Kathleen (2004). America's Founding Food: The Story of New England Cooking. Chapel Hill, North Carolina & London: The University of North Carolina Press. ISBN 0-8078-2894-7.
- Flandrin, Jean-Louis (2007) [2002 in French as L ‘Ordre des mets]. Arranging the Meal: A History of Table Service in France. Translated by Johnson, Julie E. Berkeley and Los Angeles, California: University of California Press. ISBN 978-0-520-23885-5.
- Matz, Samuel A (1992). Bakery Technology and Engineering. Springer. ISBN 978-0-442-30855-1.
