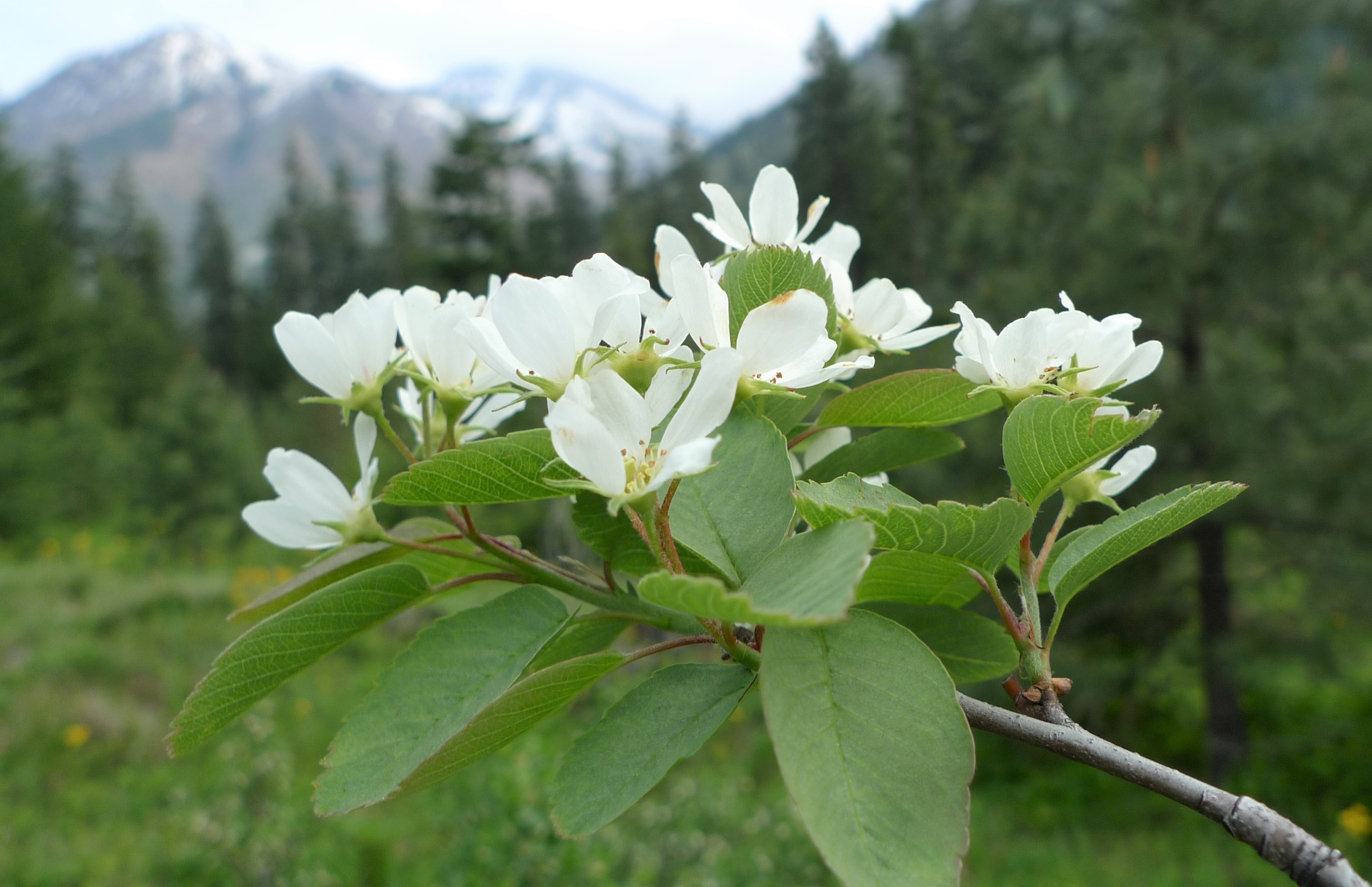
- Amelanchier alnifolia var. semiintegrifolia, Chelan County, Washington

Conservation status
- Least Concern (IUCN 3.1)

Scientific classification
- Kingdom: Plantae
- Clade: Tracheophytes
- Clade: Angiosperms
- Clade: Eudicots
- Clade: Rosids
- Order: Rosales
- Family: Rosaceae
- Genus: Amelanchier
- Species: A. alnifolia

Binomial name
- Amelanchier alnifolia (Nutt.) Nutt.
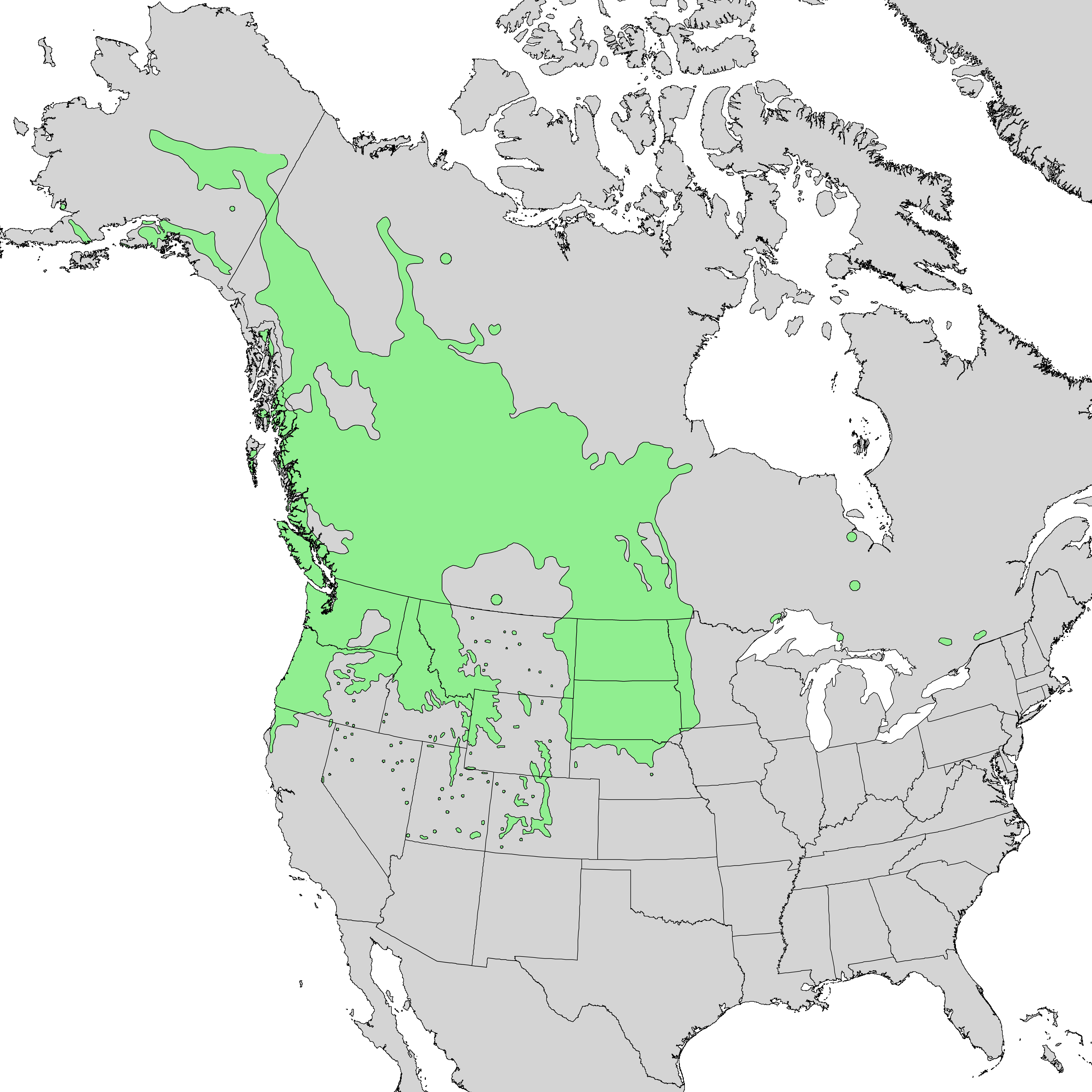
- Natural range of Amelanchier alnifolia

Synonyms
- A. florida Lindl.; A. pumila (Torr. & A. Gray) Nutt. ex M. Roem.; Aronia alnifolia Nutt.

= Amelanchier alnifolia =

Species of tree

Amelanchier alnifolia, the saskatoon berry, Pacific serviceberry, western serviceberry, western shadbush, or western juneberry, is a shrub native to North America. It is a member of the rose family, and bears an edible berry-like fruit.

== Description ==
It is a deciduous shrub or small tree that most often grows to 1–8 metres (3–26 feet), rarely to 10 m or 33 ft, in height. Its growth form spans from suckering and forming colonies to clumped. The leaves are oval to nearly circular, 2–5 centimetres (3/4–2 inches) long and 1–4.5 cm (1/2–1 3/4 in) broad, on a 0.5–2 cm (1/4–3/4 in) leaf stem, with margins toothed mostly above the middle.

As with all species in the genus Amelanchier, the flowers are white, with five quite separate petals and five sepals. In A. alnifolia, they are about 2.5–5 cm (1–2 in) across, with 20 stamens and five styles, appearing on short racemes of 3–20, somewhat crowded together, blooming from April to July.

The fruit is a small purple pome 5–15 mm (3/16–19/32 in) in diameter, ripening in early summer. It has a waxy bloom. Saskatoon species can be relatively difficult to distinguish.

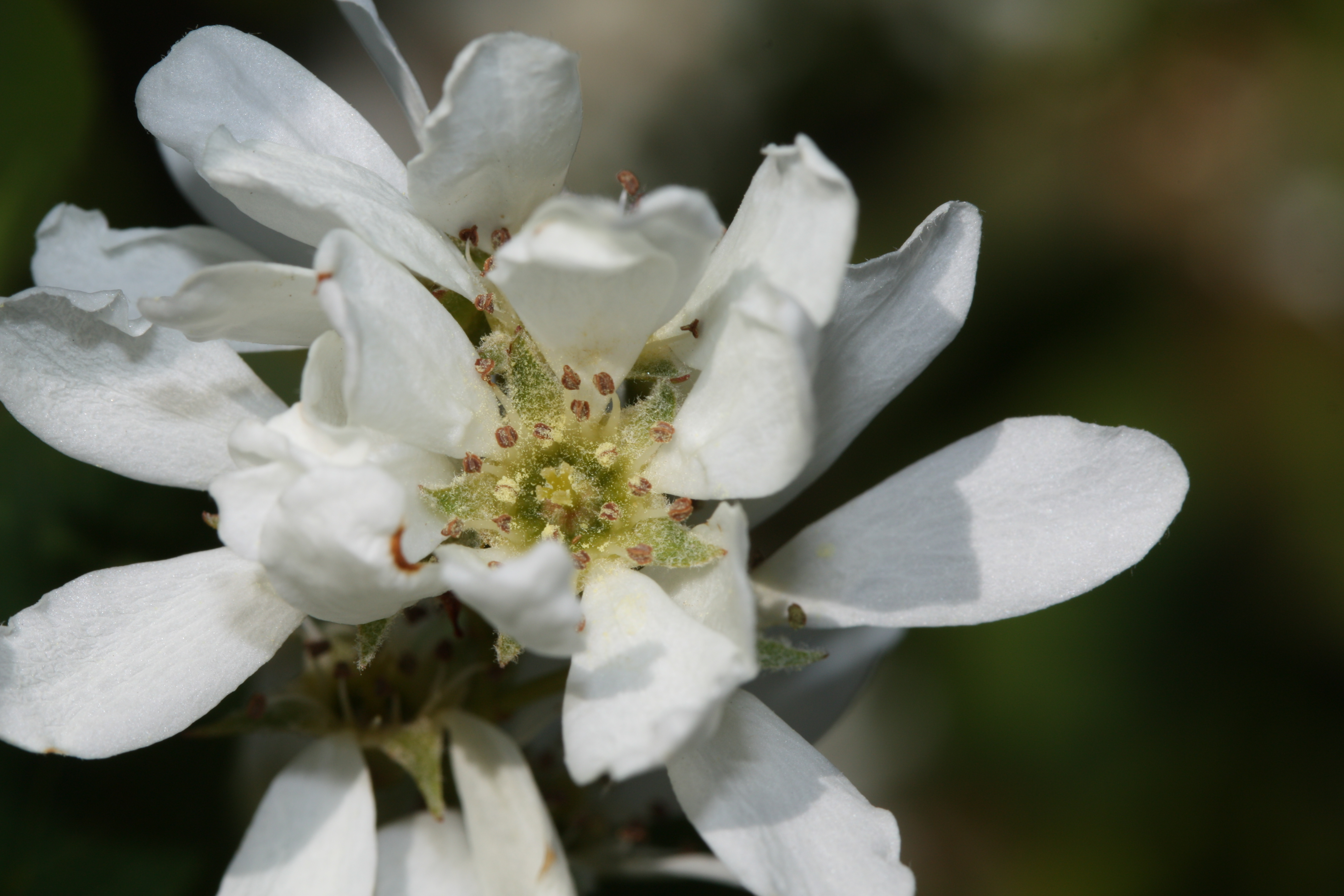
Close-up of A. a. var. semiintegrifolia flower

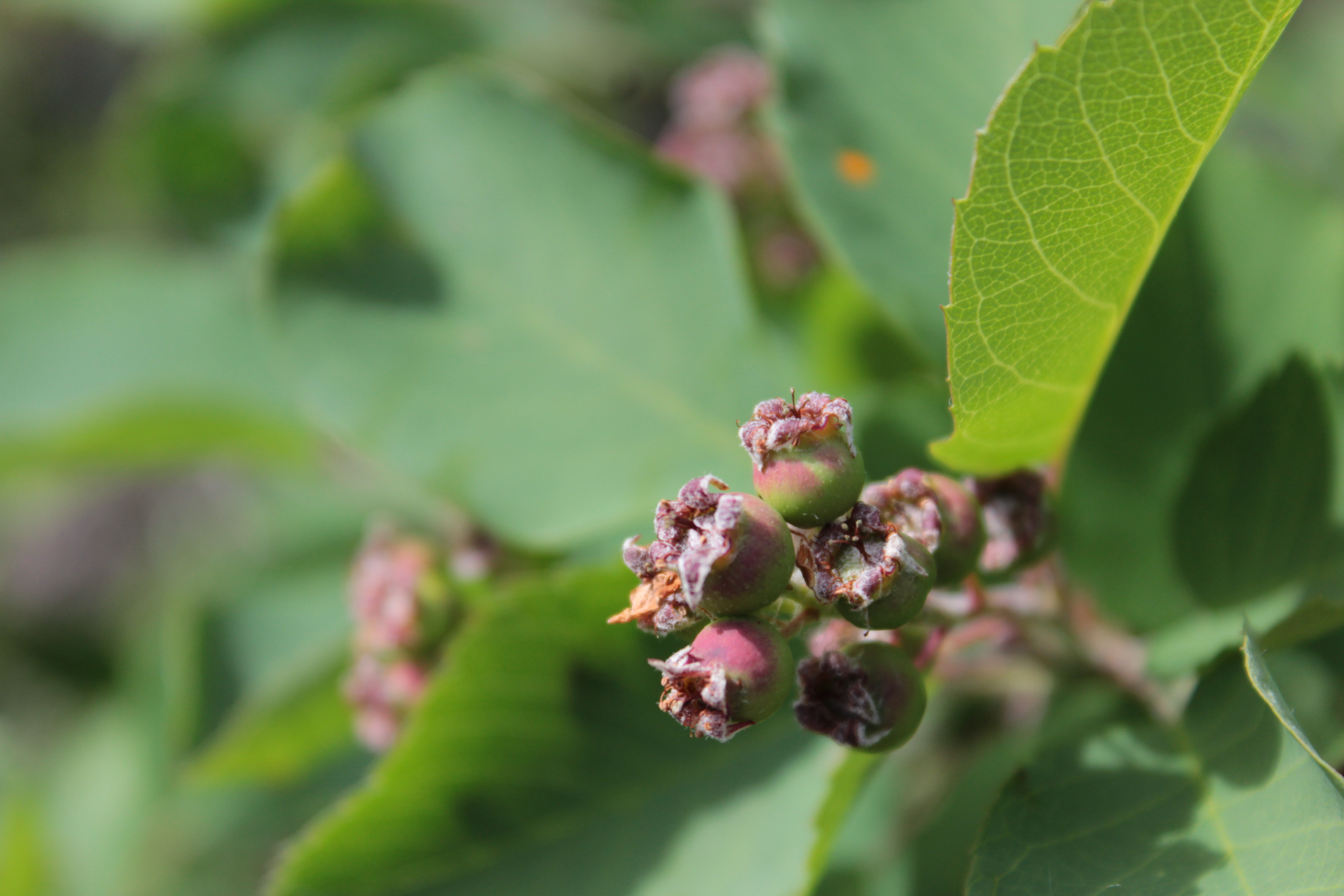
Unripe fruit

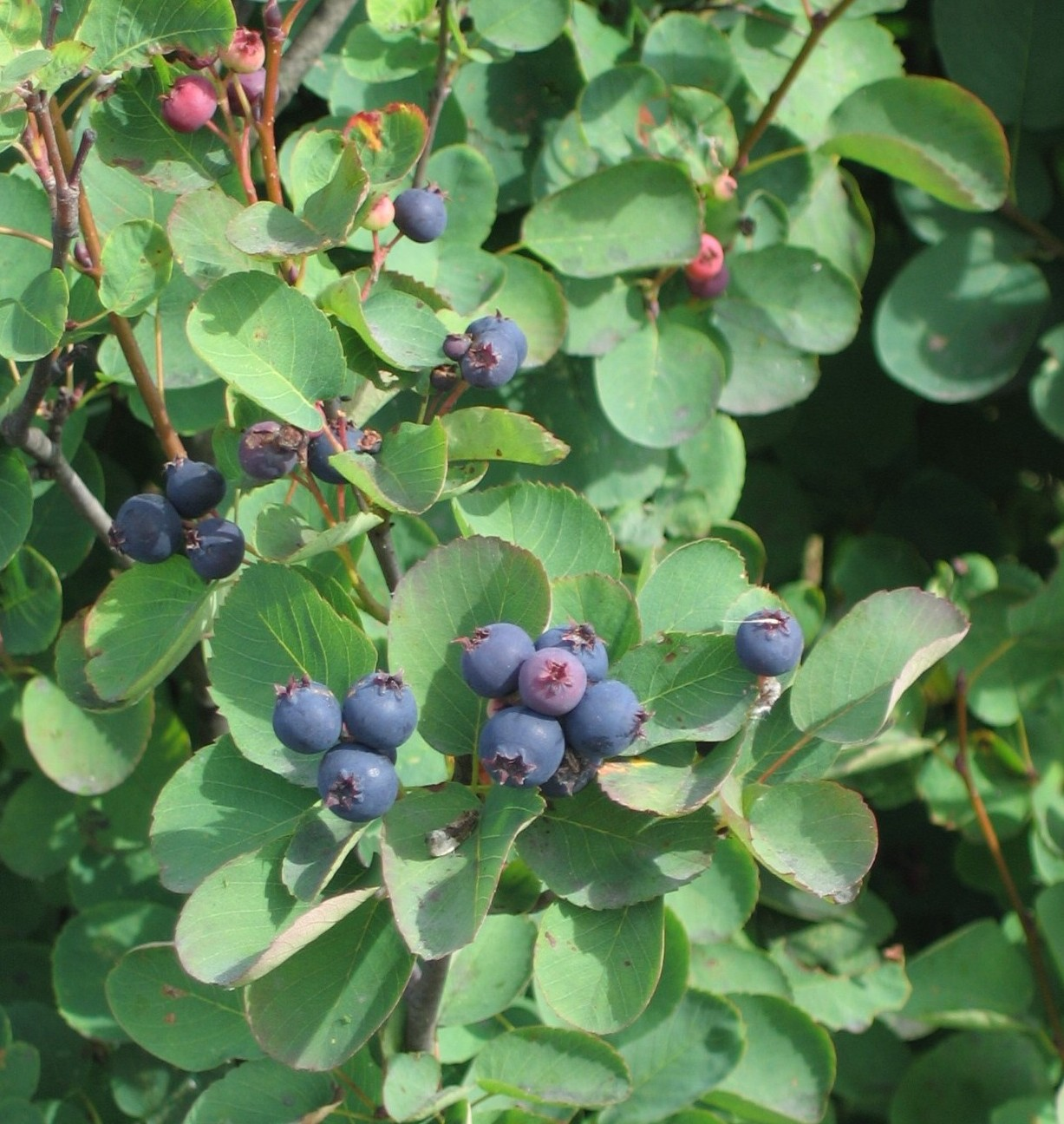
Ripe fruit

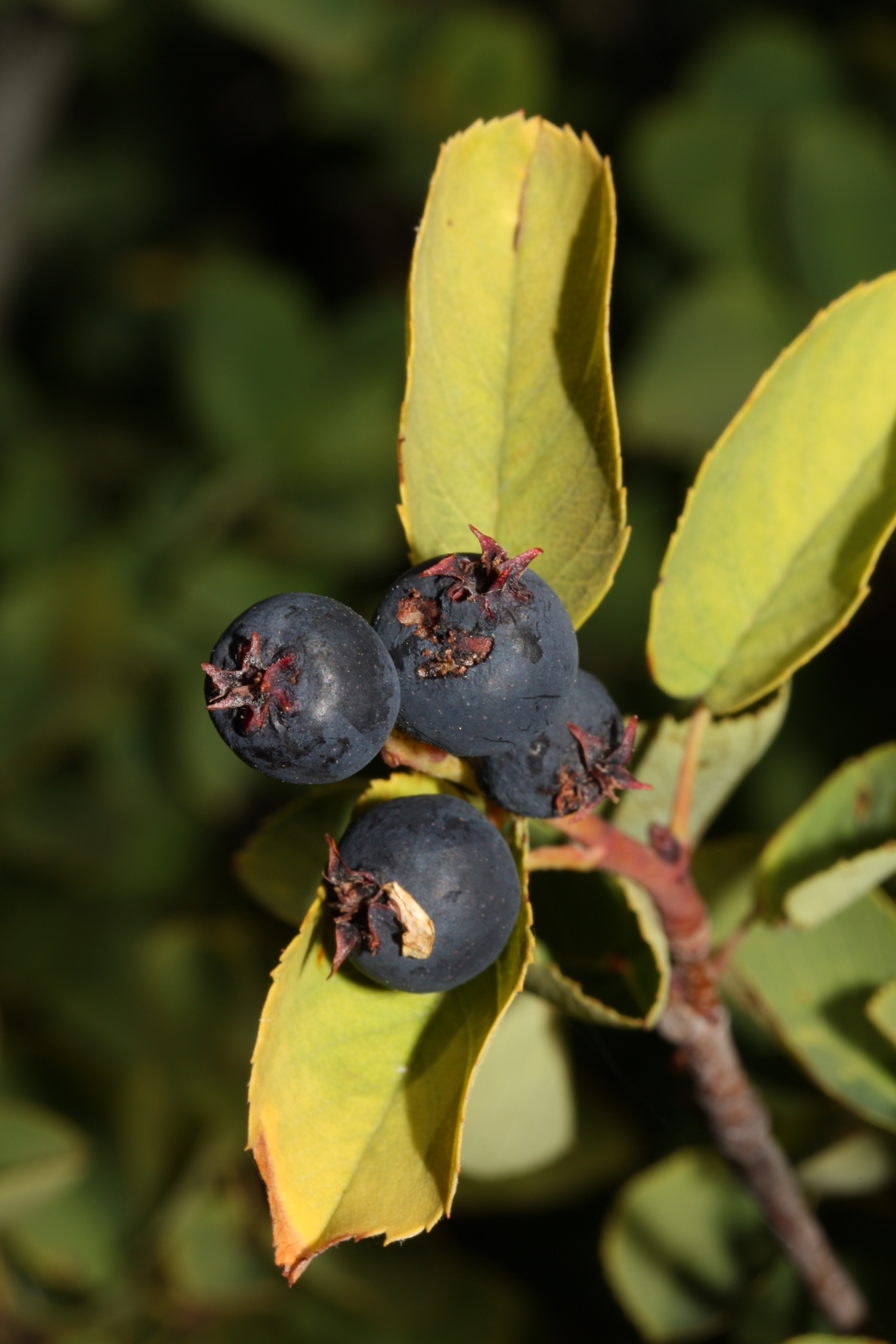
Close-up of pomes

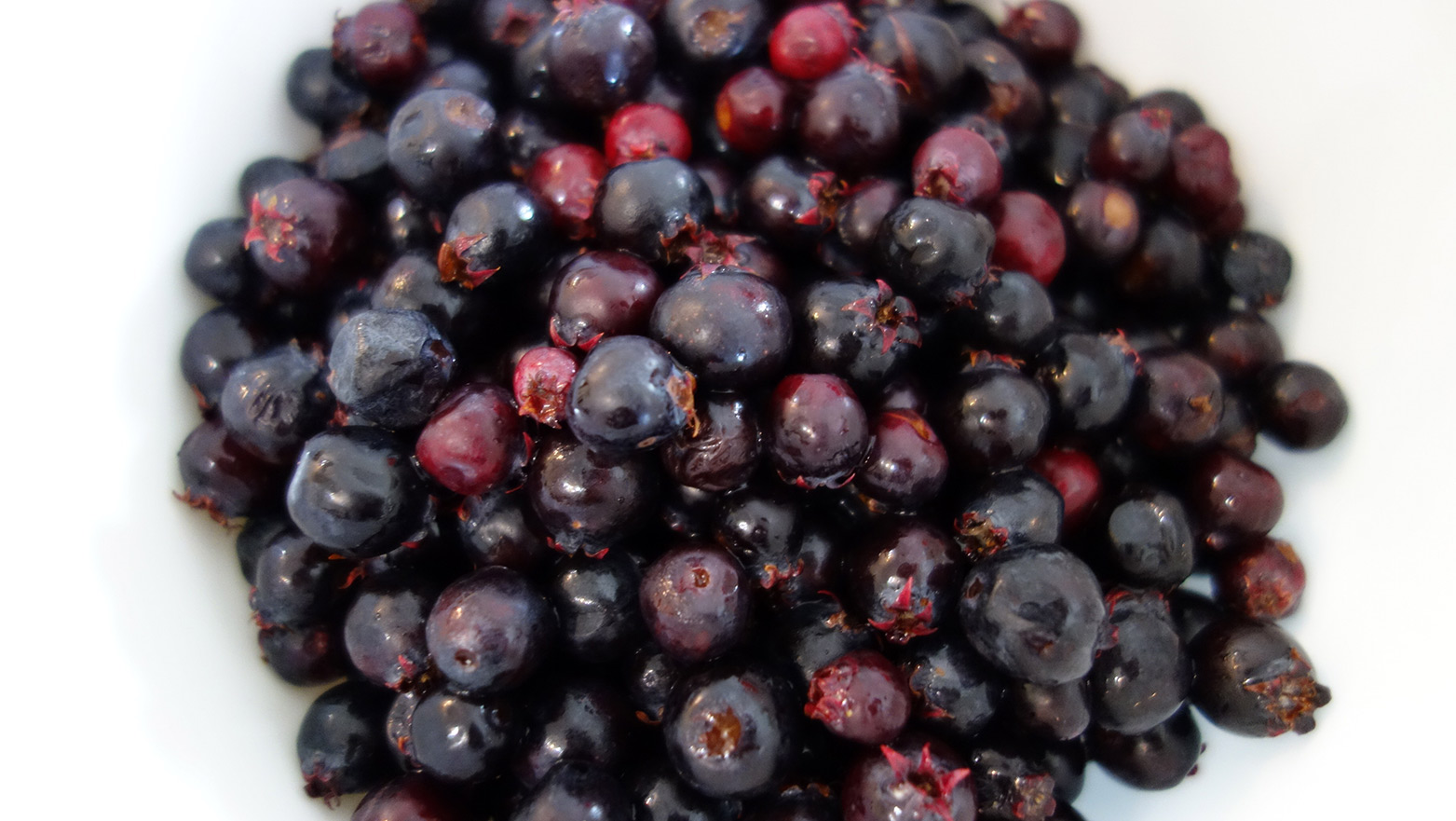
Saskatoons picked near Wainwright, Alberta

=== Chemistry ===
Saskatoons have total polyphenol content of 452 milligrams per 100 grams (average of 'Smoky' and 'Northline' cultivars), flavonols (61 mg) and anthocyanins (178 mg), although others have found the phenolic values to be either lower in the 'Smoky' cultivar or higher. Quercetin, cyanidin, delphinidin, pelargonidin, petunidin, peonidin, and malvidin were present in saskatoon berries.

== Taxonomy ==
=== Varieties ===
The three varieties are:

- A. a. var. alnifolia. Northeastern part of the species' range.
- A. a. var. pumila (Nutt.) A.Nelson. Rocky Mountains, Sierra Nevada.
- A. a. var. semiintegrifolia (Hook.) C.L.Hitchc. Pacific coastal regions, Alaska to northwestern California.

=== Etymology ===
The name saskatoon derives from the Cree inanimate noun ᒥᓵᐢᐠᐘᑑᒥᓇ misâskwatômina (ᒥᓵᐢᐠᐘᑑᒥᐣ misâskwatômin NI sg, 'saskatoonberry', misâskwatômina NI pl 'saskatoonberries').

The specific epithet alnifolia is a feminine adjective. It is a compound of the Latin word for "alder", alnus, and the word for "leaf", folium.

Historically, it was also called pigeon berry.

"Service berry" appears to be a name applied by European immigrants who found it similar in appearance to the European "service tree" plants of genus Sorbus and Cormus.

== Distribution and habitat ==
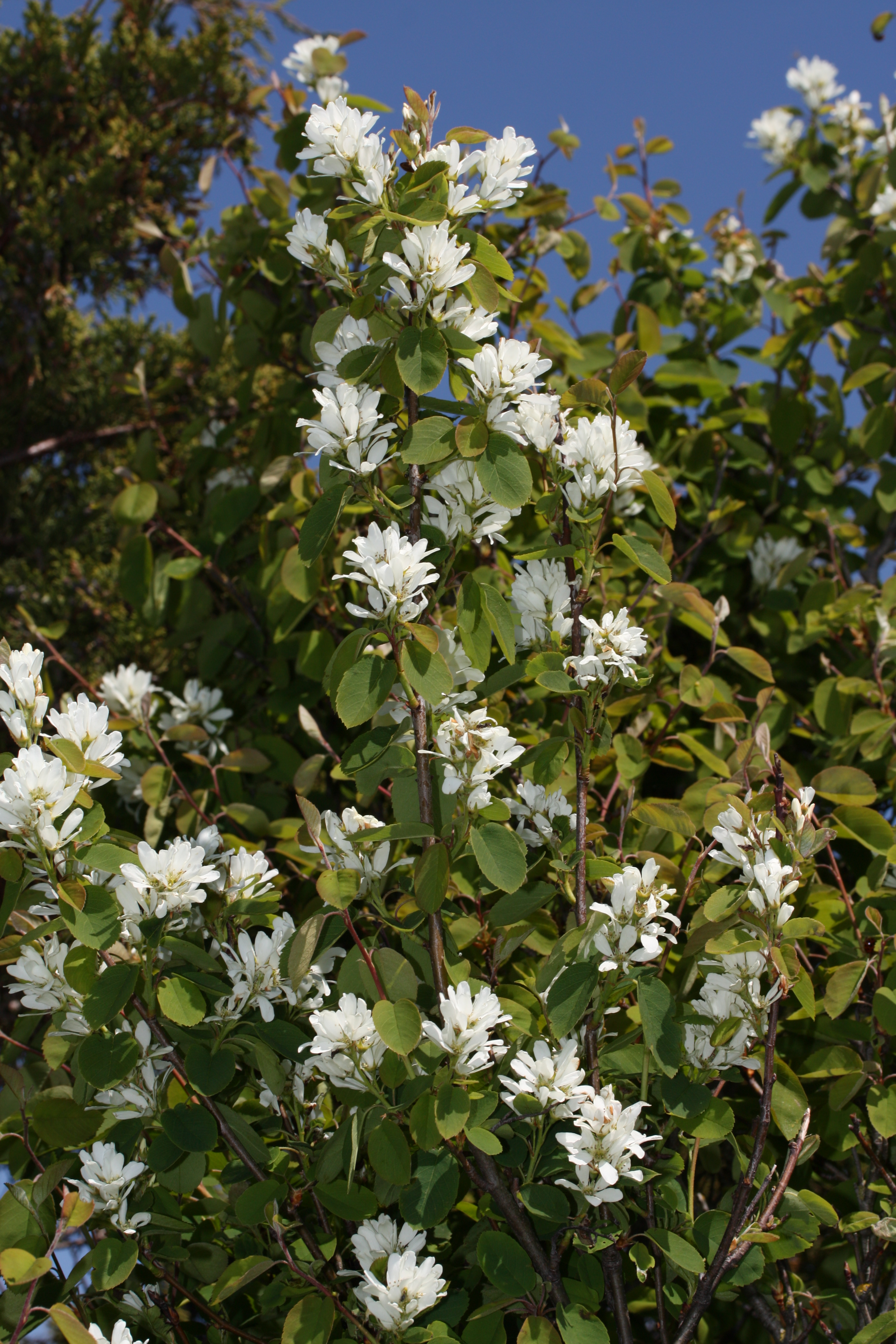
A. alnifolia var. semiintegrifolia shrub in flower, Skagit County, Washington

The plant is present from Alaska across most of western Canada and in the western and north-central United States. It grows from sea level in the north of the range, up to 2,600 m (8,530 ft) elevation in California and 3,400 m (11,200 ft) in the Rocky Mountains. It is a common shrub in the forest understory, as well as canyons.

== Ecology ==
A. alnifolia is susceptible to cedar-apple rust, Entomosporium leaf spot, fireblight, brown rot, Cytospora canker, powdery mildew, and blackleaf. Problem insects include aphids, thrips, mites, bud moths, saskatoon sawflies, and pear slug sawflies. It is also a larval host to the pale tiger swallowtail, two-tailed swallowtail, and the western tiger swallowtail.

The foliage is browsed by deer, elk, rabbits, and livestock. The fruit are eaten by wildlife including birds, squirrels, and bears.

== Cultivation ==
Seedlings are planted with 4.0–6.1 m (13–20 ft) between rows and 0.46–0.91 m (1.5–3 ft) between plants. An individual bush may bear fruit 30 or more years.

Saskatoons are adaptable to most soil types with exception of poorly drained or heavy clay soils lacking organic matter. Shallow soils should be avoided, especially if the water table is high or erratic. Winter hardiness is exceptional, but frost can damage blooms as late as May. Large amounts of sunshine are needed for fruit ripening.

Nutrients in raw saskatoon berries
Nutrient	Value per 100 g	% Daily Value
Energy	85 kcal	
Total dietary fiber	5.9 g	20%
Sugars, total	11.4 g	8%
Calcium	42 mg	4%
Magnesium	24 mg	6%
Iron	1 mg	12%
Manganese	1.4 mg	70%
Potassium	162 mg	3%
Sodium	0.5 mg	0%
Vitamin C	3.6 mg	4%
Vitamin A	11 IU	1%
Vitamin E	1.1 mg	7%
Folate	4.6 μg	1%
Riboflavin	3.5 mg	> 100%
Panthothenic acid	0.3 mg	6%
Pyridoxine	0.03 mg	2%
Biotin	20 μg	67%

== Uses ==
=== Nutrition ===
Saskatoon berries contain significant amounts of total dietary fiber, riboflavin and biotin, and the dietary minerals, iron and manganese, a nutrient profile similar to the content of blueberries.

=== Culinary ===
With a sweet, nutty taste, the fruits have long been eaten by Indigenous peoples in Canada, fresh or dried. They are well known as an ingredient in pemmican, a preparation of dried meat to which saskatoon berries are added as flavour and preservative. They are used in saskatoon berry pie, jam, wine, cider, beers, and sugar-infused berries similar to dried cranberries used for breakfast cereals, trail mix, and snack foods.

In 2004, the British Food Standards Agency suspended saskatoon berries from retail sales pending safety testing; the ban eventually was lifted.

== In culture ==
The city of Saskatoon, Saskatchewan, is named after the berry; the city is also home to a baseball team called the Saskatoon Berries.

The saskatoon berry pie has become iconic on the Canadian prairies.

Nlaka'pamux traditional knowledge holds that when saskatoon berry starts blooming, bitterroot is ready to be dug up and harvested. The Syilx/Okanagan, in turn, use the blooming of brittle pricklypear as an indicator that saskatoon berries are ready to harvest.
