= Bumbleberry pie =

Canadian mixed berry pie

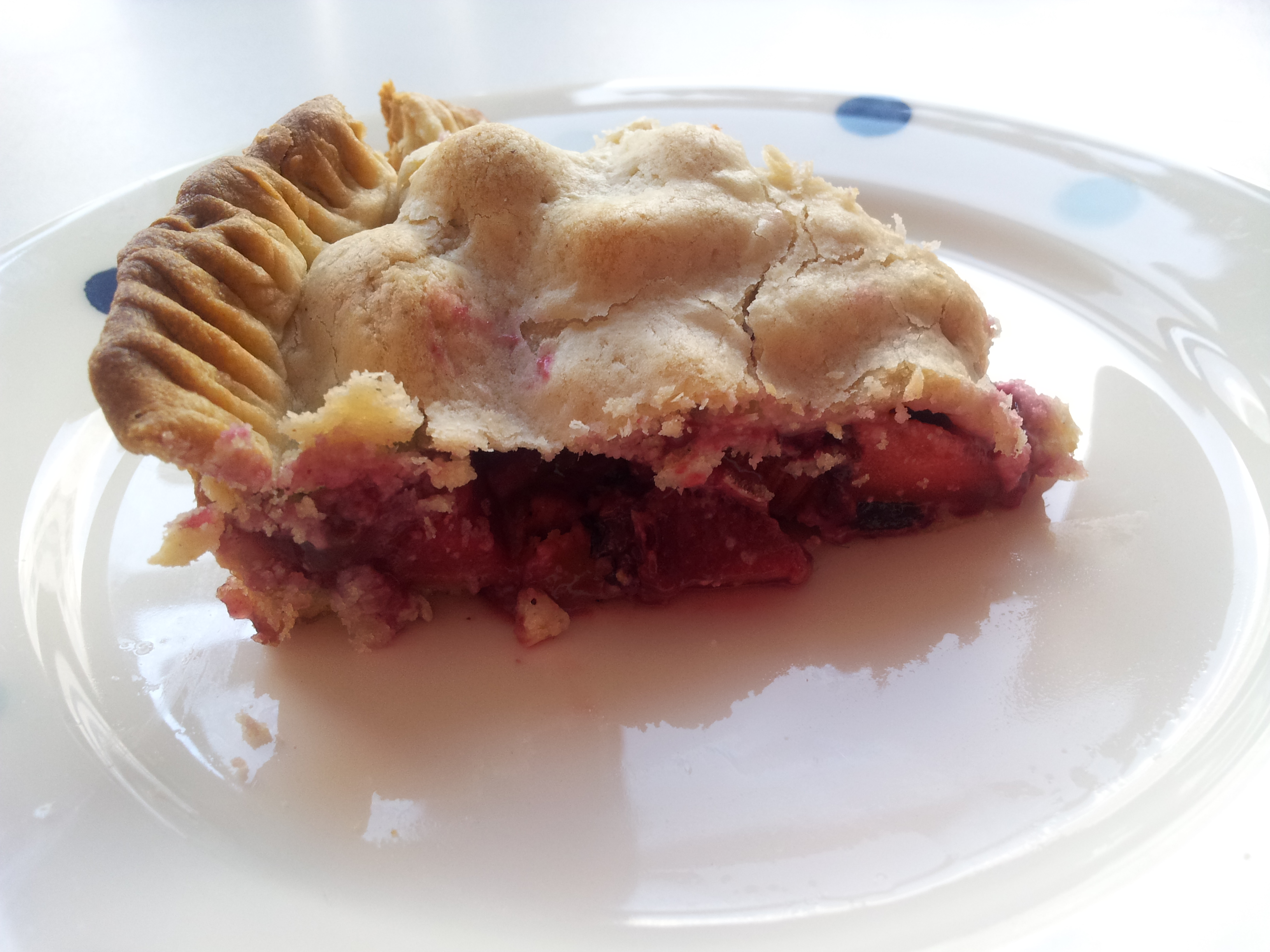
- A slice of bumbleberry pie
- Course: Dessert
- Place of origin: Canada
- Main ingredients: Various berries

Bumbleberry pie is a mixed berry pie. It is made of at least three kinds of berries, but generally refers to a mixed berry pie, as there is no such berry as a "bumbleberry". This pie often also contains apple or rhubarb. Berries commonly used in this pie may include blueberries, raspberries, strawberries, and blackberries.

== See also ==
- List of pies, tarts and flans
- Fruit pie
