= Coat of arms of Saskatoon =

Coat of Arms of Saskatoon

Versions
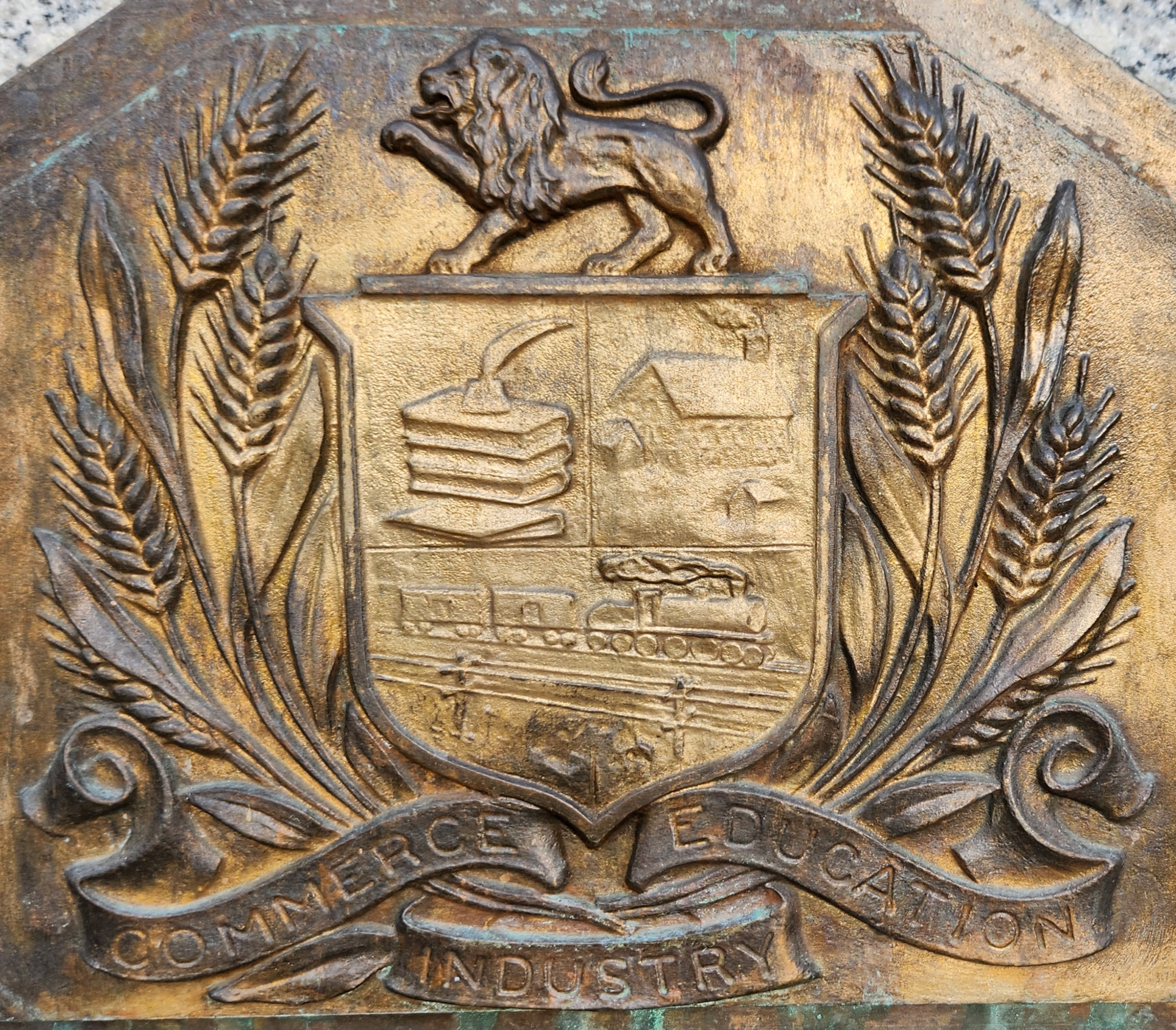
- Earlier coat of arms used from 1913-1949
- Armiger: Saskatoon, Saskatchewan
- Adopted: January 14, 1949 (Assumed) June 20, 2025 (Registered)
- Crest: A lion passant guardant Or holding a sprig of Saskatoon berry (Amelanchier Alnifolia Nutt) fructed Vert
- Shield: Per chevron Vert and Or, in chief an open book Argent bound Sable and a cogwheel Argent surmounted by an ear of wheat Or, in base a cross and saltire Sable surmounted by a pellet all voided
- Supporters: Two stalks of wheat (Optional)
- Motto: Commerce, Industry, Education
- Designer: A.L. Atkinson

The coat of arms of Saskatoon is the heraldic symbol representing the city of Saskatoon.

It is visible on the city flag, adopted in 1980, as well as the Saskatoon Police Service coat of arms which was registered by the Canadian Heraldic Authority in 2007.

== History ==
The modern coat of arms were designed in 1948 by A.L. Atkinson, an engineer professor at the University of Saskatchewan and heraldry enthusiast. City council would later vote in favour of granting $50 to Atkinson as a tangible expression of Saskatoon's appreciation for his design of the coat of arms.

Saskatoon adopted Akinson's design on January 14, 1949 by Bylaw No. 3081 following the incapability of the former design adopted in 1913 to be described in proper heraldic language, rendering the former design unable to be approved.

The 1913 version was divided into three segments. The basic symbolism of each section was retained, and incorporated into Atkinson's 1949 design; the stack of books and inkwell became a single book; the mill became a cog and ear of wheat; and the railyard in the base became the voided saltire and cross.

The book on the new 1949 arms represents learning and the University of Saskatchewan, the cog evokes industry, the wheat ear symbolizes agriculture in the area and the unusual charge in the base represents Saskatoon's being a major railway hub.

In 1988, city council declined to have the arms registered with the Canadian Heraldic Authority, however the reason for doing so was never recorded.

In 2024, city council was given a one-time offer to waive the $5,000 registration fee if council was willing to have the arms registered immediately. Council agree to do so and on the June 20, 2025, the arms were officially registered with the Authority, 76 years after first being devised by Atkinson.

== Blazon ==
The blazon is:

Arms: Per chevron Vert and Or, in chief an open book Argent bound Sable and a cogwheel Argent surmounted by an ear of wheat Or, in base a cross and saltire Sable surmounted by a pellet all voided

Crest: A lion passant guardant Or holding a sprig of Saskatoon berry (Amelanchier Alnifolia Nutt) fructed Vert

Supporters: The stalks of wheat are not included in the blazon and are considered an artistic embellishment and may be omitted.
